= Canton of Longuyon =

Former canton in Meurthe-et-Moselle, France

Coordinates: 49°27′45″N 5°30′23″E

- Former canton
- Location of the canton in the arrondissement of Briey
- Country: France
- Region: Grand Est
- Department: Meurthe-et-Moselle
- No. of communes: {{{nbcomm}}}
- Disbanded: 2015

Government
  - Representatives: Pierre Mersch
- Area: 214.43 km^{2} (82.79 sq mi)
- Population (2012): 14,810
  - Density: 69.07/km^{2} (178.9/sq mi)

The canton of Longuyon (French: Canton de Longuyon) is a former French canton located in the department of Meurthe-et-Moselle in the Lorraine region (now part of Grand Est). This canton was organized around Nomeny in the arrondissement of Briey. It is now part of the canton of Mont-Saint-Martin.

The last general councillor from this canton was Pierre Mersch (DVG), elected in 1976.

== Composition ==
The canton of Nomeny grouped together 23 municipalities and had 14,810 inhabitants (2012 census without double counts).

1. Allondrelle-la-Malmaison
2. Beuveille
3. Charency-Vezin
4. Colmey
5. Cons-la-Grandville
6. Doncourt-lès-Longuyon
7. Épiez-sur-Chiers
8. Fresnois-la-Montagne
9. Grand-Failly
10. Han-devant-Pierrepont
11. Longuyon
12. Montigny-sur-Chiers
13. Othe
14. Petit-Failly
15. Pierrepont
16. Saint-Jean-lès-Longuyon
17. Saint-Pancré
18. Tellancourt
19. Ugny
20. Villers-la-Chèvre
21. Villers-le-Rond
22. Villette
23. Viviers-sur-Chiers
