= Han River =

Han River may refer to:

- Han River (Guangdong) (Hánjiāng, 韩江), southeast China, flows into the South China Sea
- Han River (Hubei and Shaanxi) (Hànshuǐ, 漢水 or Hànjiāng, 漢江), the longest tributary of the Yangtze, China
- Han River (Korea) (Hangang, 한강, 漢江), flowing through Seoul, Korea
- Han River (Taiwan) (Hànxī, 旱溪), flowing through Taichung, Taiwan
- Hàn River (Vietnam) (Sông Hàn), empties into the South China Sea at Da Nang

== See also ==
- Xihan River or Western Han River (西汉水), a northern tributary of the Jialing River, China
- Hann River (Western Australia)
- Hann River (Queensland)
- Hanjiang (disambiguation)
- Han Gang (disambiguation)
- Han (disambiguation)
