= Han history =

Han history may refer to:

- Book of Han, a history book by Pan Gu and his family
- History of the Han dynasty

== See also ==
- Han (disambiguation)
- Han dynasty
- Book of Later Han
