= Hanguo =

Hanguo (Chinese: 韩国; pinyin: Hánguó) may refer to:

- Han (disambiguation)
- South Korea
