= Boismont =

Boismont may refer to:

- Boismont, Meurthe-et-Moselle, a commune in the department of Meurthe-et-Moselle in France
- Boismont, Somme, a commune in the department of Somme in France
- Alexandre Jacques François Brière de Boismont, a French physician and psychiatrist.
- Nicolas Thyrel de Boismont, a French abbot
