= Beuveille =

- Commune
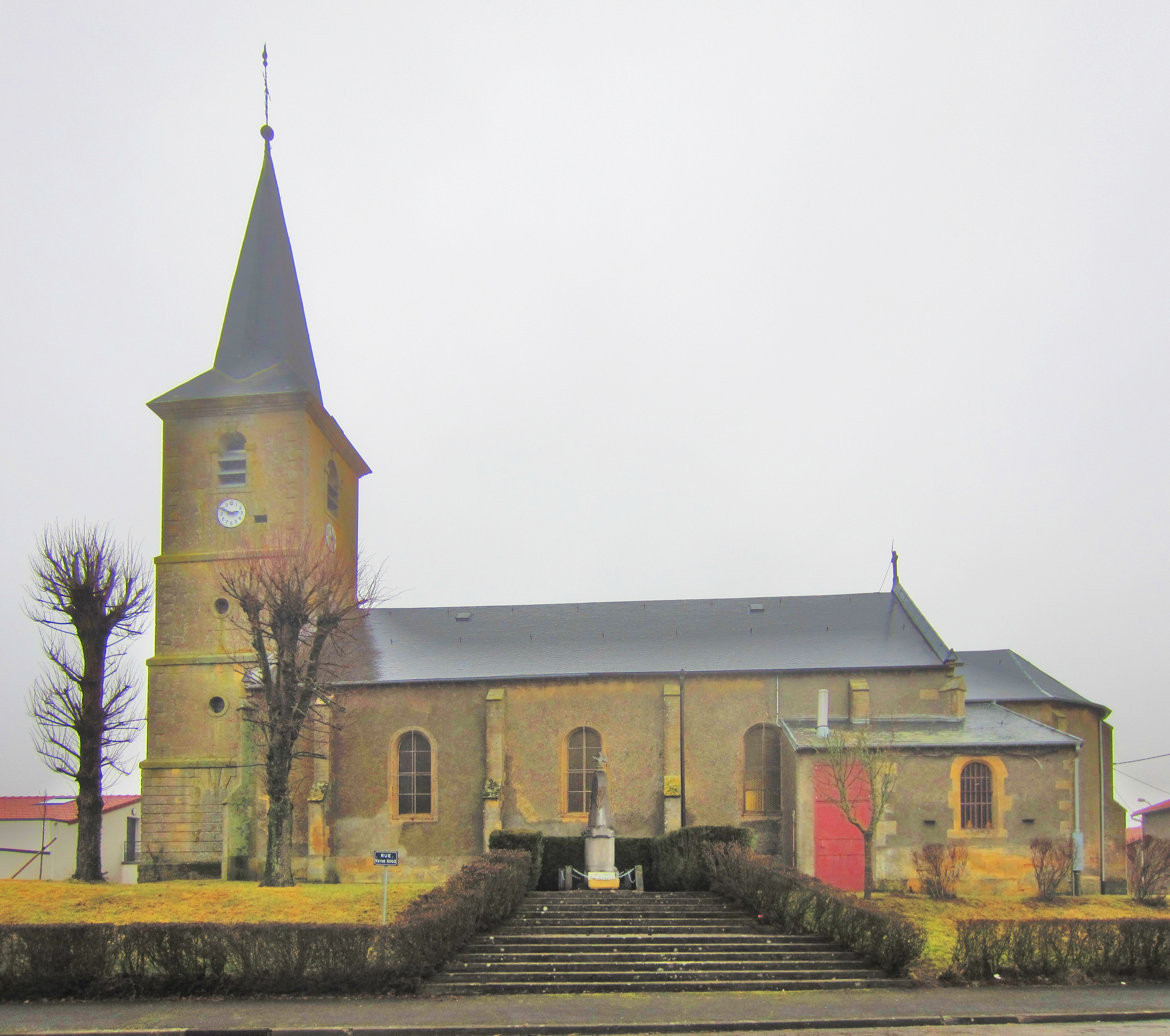
- The church in Beuveille

- Coat of arms
- Location of Beuveille
- Location within France Location within Grand Est
- Coordinates: 49°25′57″N 5°41′28″E
- Country: France
- Region: Grand Est
- Department: Meurthe-et-Moselle
- Arrondissement: Val-de-Briey
- Canton: Mont-Saint-Martin

Government
  - Mayor (2025–2026): Mélissa Payo
- Area^{1}: 11.9 km^{2} (4.6 sq mi)
- Elevation: 234 m (768 ft)
- Highest elevation: 333 m (1,093 ft)
- Lowest elevation: 217 m (712 ft)
- Population (2023): 783
  - Density: 65.8/km^{2} (170/sq mi)
- Time zone: UTC+01:00 (CET)
  - Summer (DST): UTC+02:00 (CEST)
- INSEE/Postal code: 54067 /54620
- ^{1} French Land Register data, which excludes lakes, ponds, glaciers > 1 km^{2} (0.386 sq mi or 247 acres) and river estuaries.

Beuveille (French pronunciation: [bøvɛj]) is a commune in the Meurthe-et-Moselle department in northeastern France.

== History ==
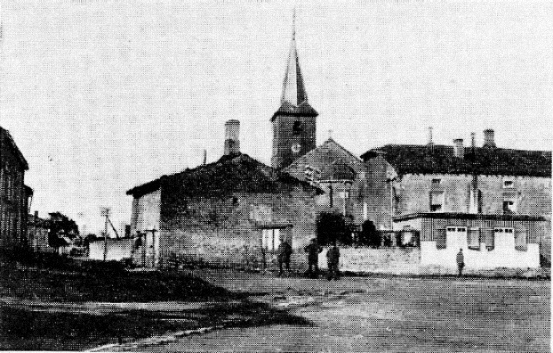
Beveille in 1919

In the First World War during the Battle of Longwy (1914) Beuveille has been combat-standing of the German Crown Prince.

From 1915 to 1918 Beuveille became the headquarter of the Sturm-Bataillon Nr. 5 (Rohr).

Its artillery took place in Ugny, its hospital and the cemetery which includes their Monument in Pierrepont and the training ground and in the forest of Doncourt.

== Population ==
Historical population
| Year | Pop. | ±% p.a. |
|---|---|---|
| 1968 | 773 | — |
| 1975 | 667 | −2.08% |
| 1982 | 586 | −1.83% |
| 1990 | 560 | −0.57% |
| 1999 | 519 | −0.84% |
| 2007 | 630 | +2.45% |
| 2012 | 776 | +4.26% |
| 2017 | 760 | −0.42% |
| 2023 | 783 | +0.50% |
Source: INSEE

== See also ==
- Communes of the Meurthe-et-Moselle department
