= Han Army =

Han Army may refer to one of the following related to Han Chinese people:

- An army or military of any of several Han states dating from the 11th century BCE
- Han Army of Eight Banners, Han Chinese groups in the Ming Dynasty (1368–1644) who surrendered to or joined the Qing Dynasty
- Any army composed primarily of ethnic Han Chinese, from the 11th century BCE to current
