= Later Han =

Later Han (後漢) may refer to two dynastic states in imperial China:

- Eastern Han (25–220), the second period of the Han dynasty, also called Later Han
- Later Han (947–951), a dynasty during the Five Dynasties and Ten Kingdoms period

== See also ==
- Han (disambiguation)
