= Baslieux =

- Commune
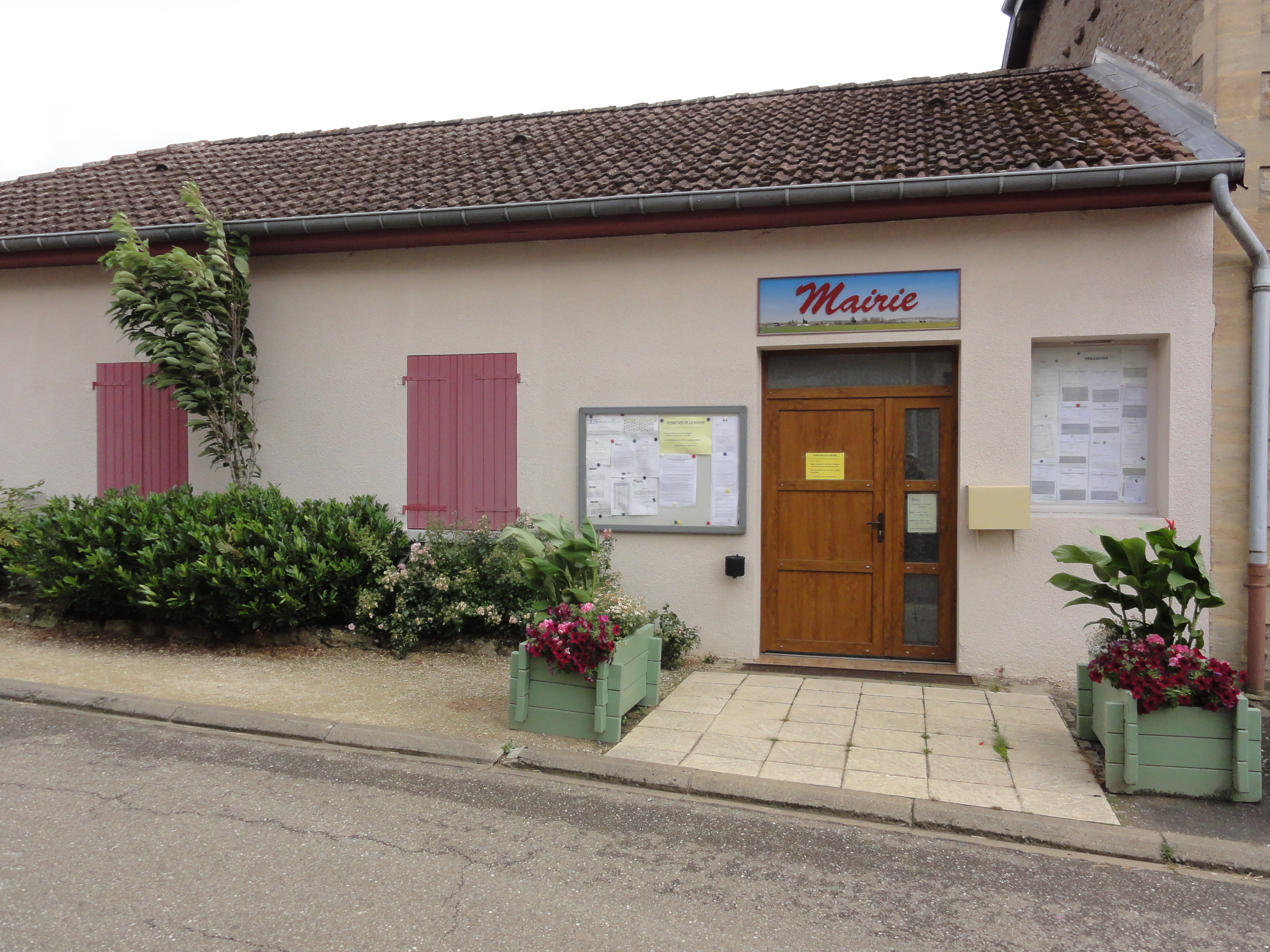
- The town hall in Baslieux

- Coat of arms
- Location of Baslieux
- Location within France Location within Grand Est
- Coordinates: 49°26′02″N 5°45′35″E
- Country: France
- Region: Grand Est
- Department: Meurthe-et-Moselle
- Arrondissement: Val-de-Briey
- Canton: Mont-Saint-Martin

Government
  - Mayor (2020–2026): Daniel Mulder
- Area^{1}: 10.17 km^{2} (3.93 sq mi)
- Elevation: 350 m (1,150 ft)
- Highest elevation: 392 m (1,286 ft)
- Lowest elevation: 244 m (801 ft)
- Population (2023): 528
  - Density: 51.9/km^{2} (134/sq mi)
- Time zone: UTC+01:00 (CET)
  - Summer (DST): UTC+02:00 (CEST)
- INSEE/Postal code: 54049 /54620
- ^{1} French Land Register data, which excludes lakes, ponds, glaciers > 1 km^{2} (0.386 sq mi or 247 acres) and river estuaries.

Baslieux (French pronunciation: [baljø]) is a commune in the Meurthe-et-Moselle department in northeastern France.

== Population ==
Historical population
Year	Pop.	±% p.a.
1968	1,054	—
1975	962	−1.30%
1982	780	−2.95%
1990	493	−5.57%
1999	534	+0.89%
2007	567	+0.75%
2012	584	+0.59%
2017	581	−0.10%
2023	528	−1.58%
Source: INSEE

== See also ==
- Communes of the Meurthe-et-Moselle department
