= Hanjiang =

Hanjiang may refer to the following in China:

- Han River (Yangtze River tributary) (汉江), a tributary of the Yangtze, in Shaanxi and Hubei
- Han River (Guangdong) (韩江), mostly in Guangdong, flowing into the South China Sea
- Hanjiang District, Putian (涵江区), Fujian
- Hanjiang District, Yangzhou (邗江区), Jiangsu
- Hanjiang, Shishi (蚶江镇), town in Shishi, Fujian

== See also ==
- Han River (disambiguation)
