= Pierrepont, Meurthe-et-Moselle =

Pierrepont
- Commune
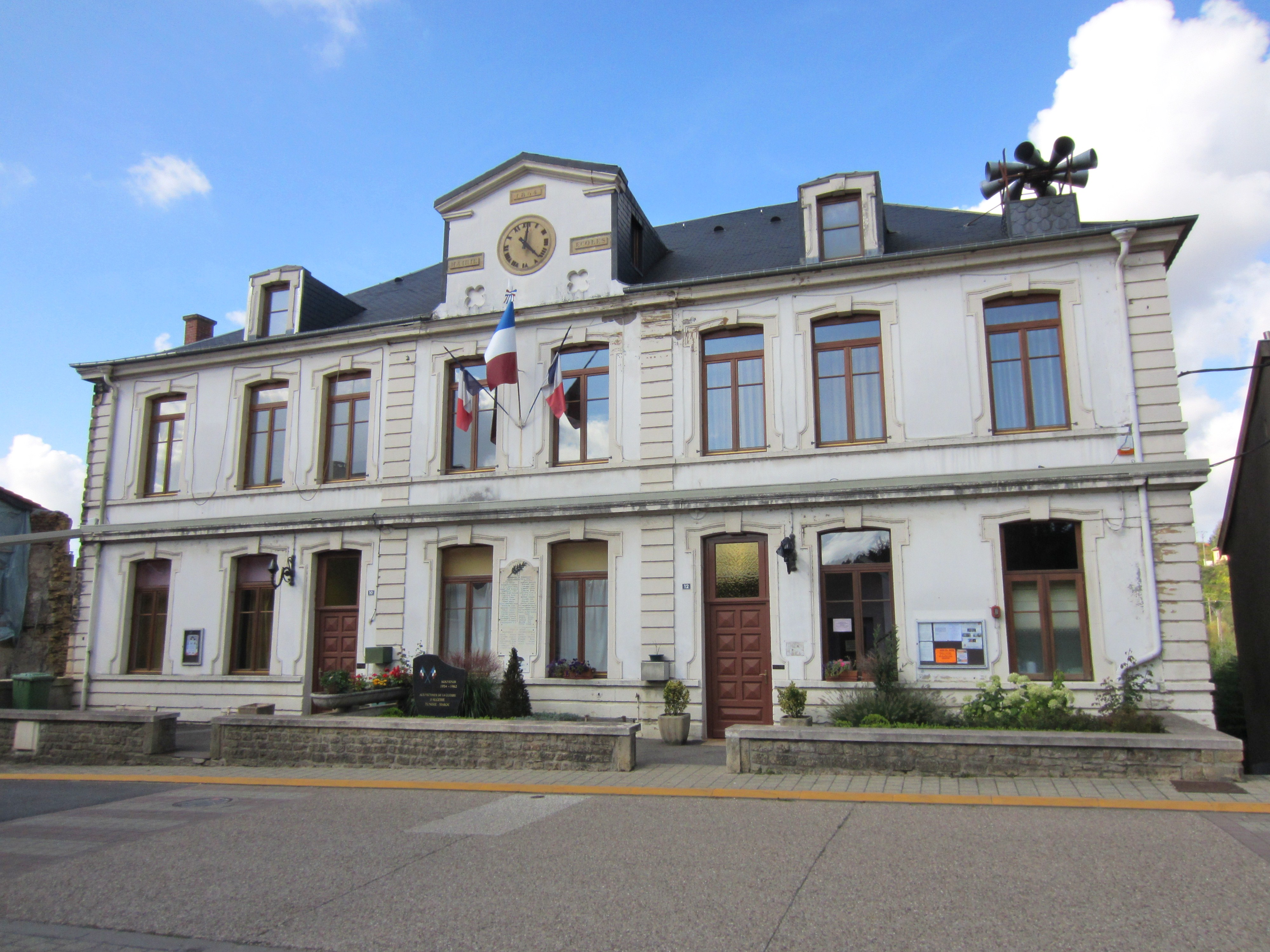
- The town hall in Pierrepont

- Coat of arms
- Location of Pierrepont
- Location within France Location within Grand Est
- Coordinates: 49°24′59″N 5°42′44″E
- Country: France
- Region: Grand Est
- Department: Meurthe-et-Moselle
- Arrondissement: Val-de-Briey
- Canton: Mont-Saint-Martin
- Intercommunality: CC Terre Lorraine du Longuyonnais

Government
  - Mayor (2020–2026): James Moineaux
- Area^{1}: 7.02 km^{2} (2.71 sq mi)
- Elevation: 241 m (791 ft)
- Highest elevation: 336 m (1,102 ft)
- Lowest elevation: 227 m (745 ft)
- Population (2023): 824
  - Density: 117/km^{2} (304/sq mi)
- Time zone: UTC+01:00 (CET)
  - Summer (DST): UTC+02:00 (CEST)
- INSEE/Postal code: 54428 /54620
- ^{1} French Land Register data, which excludes lakes, ponds, glaciers > 1 km^{2} (0.386 sq mi or 247 acres) and river estuaries.

Pierrepont (French pronunciation: [pjɛʁpɔ̃]) is a commune in the Meurthe-et-Moselle department in north-eastern France.

== History ==
During the First World War was from 1915 to 1918 in Ugny was the artillery, in the forest of Doncourt the training ground and in Beuveille has been the headquarter of the Sturm-Bataillon Nr. 5 (Rohr), in Pierrepont has been the hospital and the cemetery.

On the German soldiers cemetery, the dead of the Battalion were mostly buried. The monument, in the shape of a lion guarding the dead, has already been set up during the war and then not eliminated.

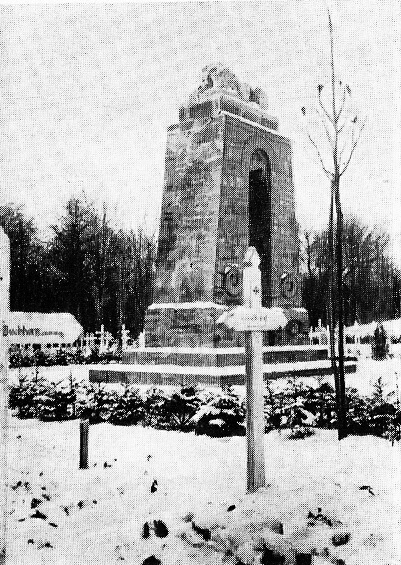
Memorial

== See also ==
- Communes of the Meurthe-et-Moselle department
