= Saint-Supplet =

- Commune
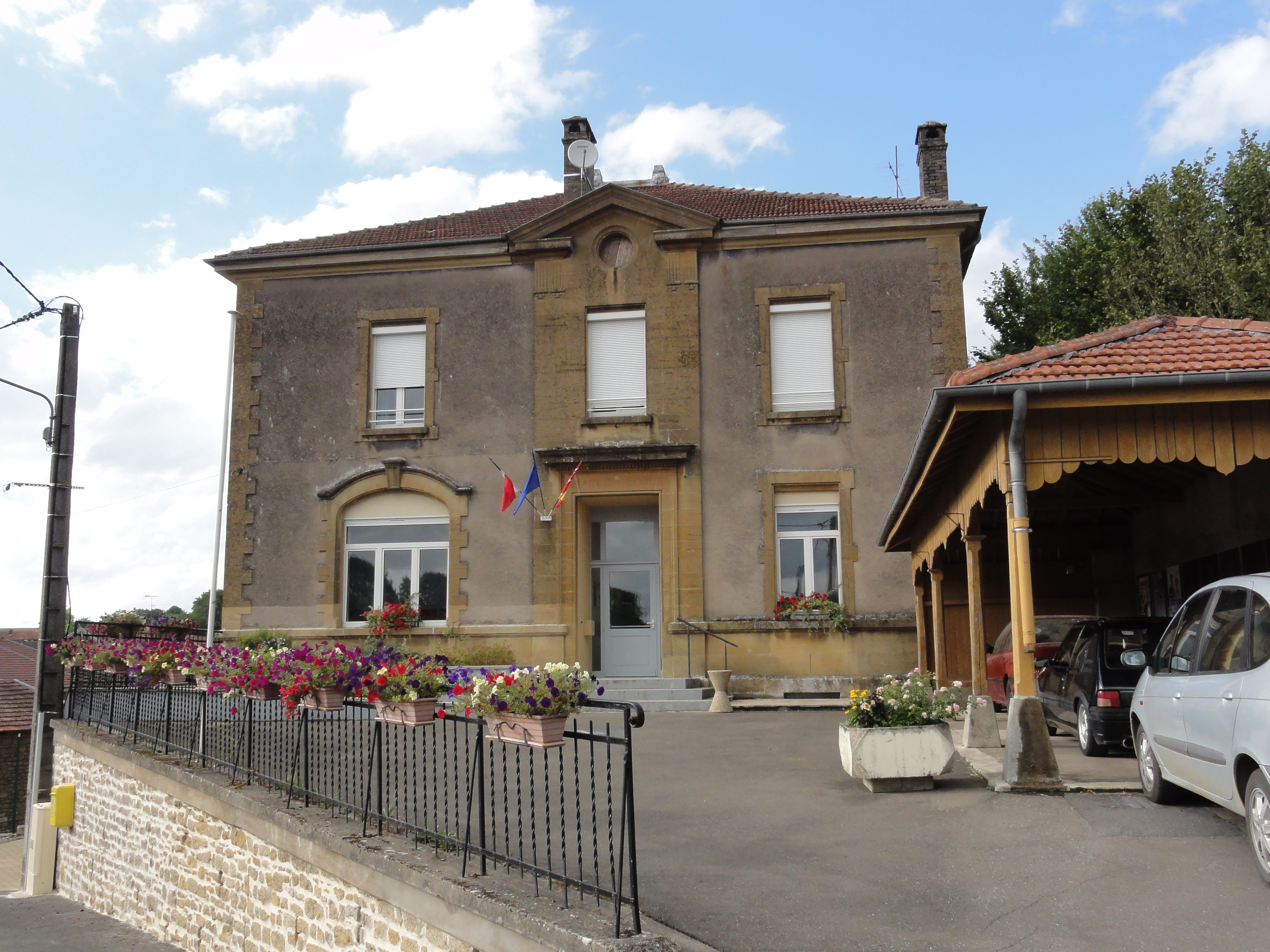
- The town hall in Saint-Supplet

- Coat of arms
- Location of Saint-Supplet
- Location within France Location within Grand Est
- Coordinates: 49°22′57″N 5°44′08″E
- Country: France
- Region: Grand Est
- Department: Meurthe-et-Moselle
- Arrondissement: Val-de-Briey
- Canton: Mont-Saint-Martin
- Intercommunality: Terre Lorraine du Longuyonnais

Government
  - Mayor (2020–2026): Rémy Jennesson
- Area^{1}: 7.43 km^{2} (2.87 sq mi)
- Elevation: 280 m (920 ft)
- Highest elevation: 323 m (1,060 ft)
- Lowest elevation: 243 m (797 ft)
- Population (2023): 150
  - Density: 20/km^{2} (52/sq mi)
- Time zone: UTC+01:00 (CET)
  - Summer (DST): UTC+02:00 (CEST)
- INSEE/Postal code: 54489 /54620
- ^{1} French Land Register data, which excludes lakes, ponds, glaciers > 1 km^{2} (0.386 sq mi or 247 acres) and river estuaries.

Saint-Supplet (French pronunciation: [sɛ̃ syplɛ]) is a commune in the Meurthe-et-Moselle department in north-eastern France.

== See also ==
- Communes of the Meurthe-et-Moselle department
