= Ville-au-Montois =

- Commune
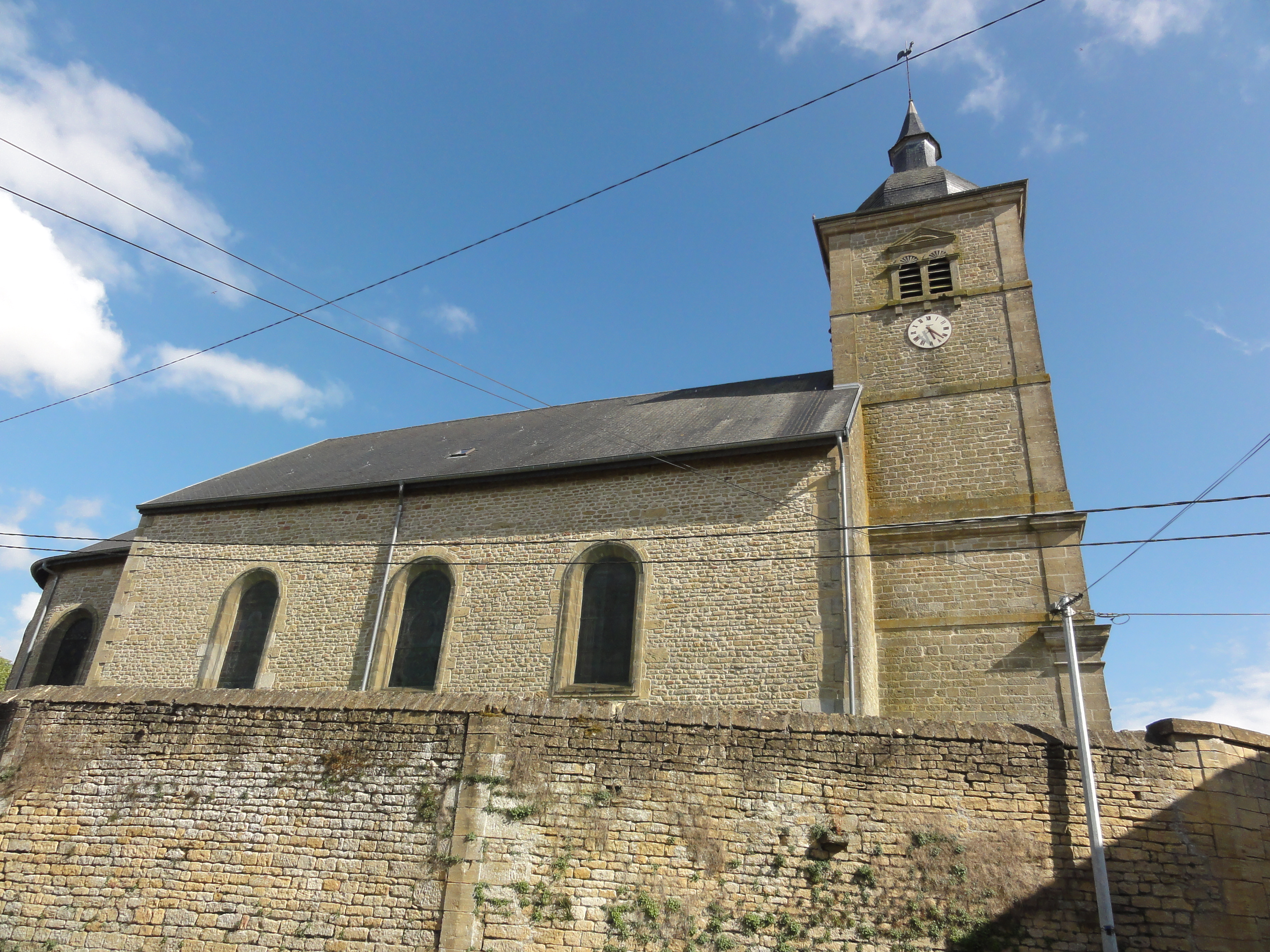
- The church in Ville-au-Montois
- Location of Ville-au-Montois
- Location within France Location within Grand Est
- Coordinates: 49°24′43″N 5°46′59″E
- Country: France
- Region: Grand Est
- Department: Meurthe-et-Moselle
- Arrondissement: Val-de-Briey
- Canton: Mont-Saint-Martin

Government
  - Mayor (2020–2026): Jean-Pierre Demuth
- Area^{1}: 12.33 km^{2} (4.76 sq mi)
- Elevation: 338 m (1,109 ft)
- Highest elevation: 387 m (1,270 ft)
- Lowest elevation: 260 m (850 ft)
- Population (2023): 242
  - Density: 19.6/km^{2} (50.8/sq mi)
- Time zone: UTC+01:00 (CET)
  - Summer (DST): UTC+02:00 (CEST)
- INSEE/Postal code: 54568 /54620
- ^{1} French Land Register data, which excludes lakes, ponds, glaciers > 1 km^{2} (0.386 sq mi or 247 acres) and river estuaries.

Ville-au-Montois (French pronunciation: [vil o mɔ̃twa]) is a commune in the Meurthe-et-Moselle department in north-eastern France.

== See also ==
- Communes of the Meurthe-et-Moselle department
