= Bazailles =

- Commune
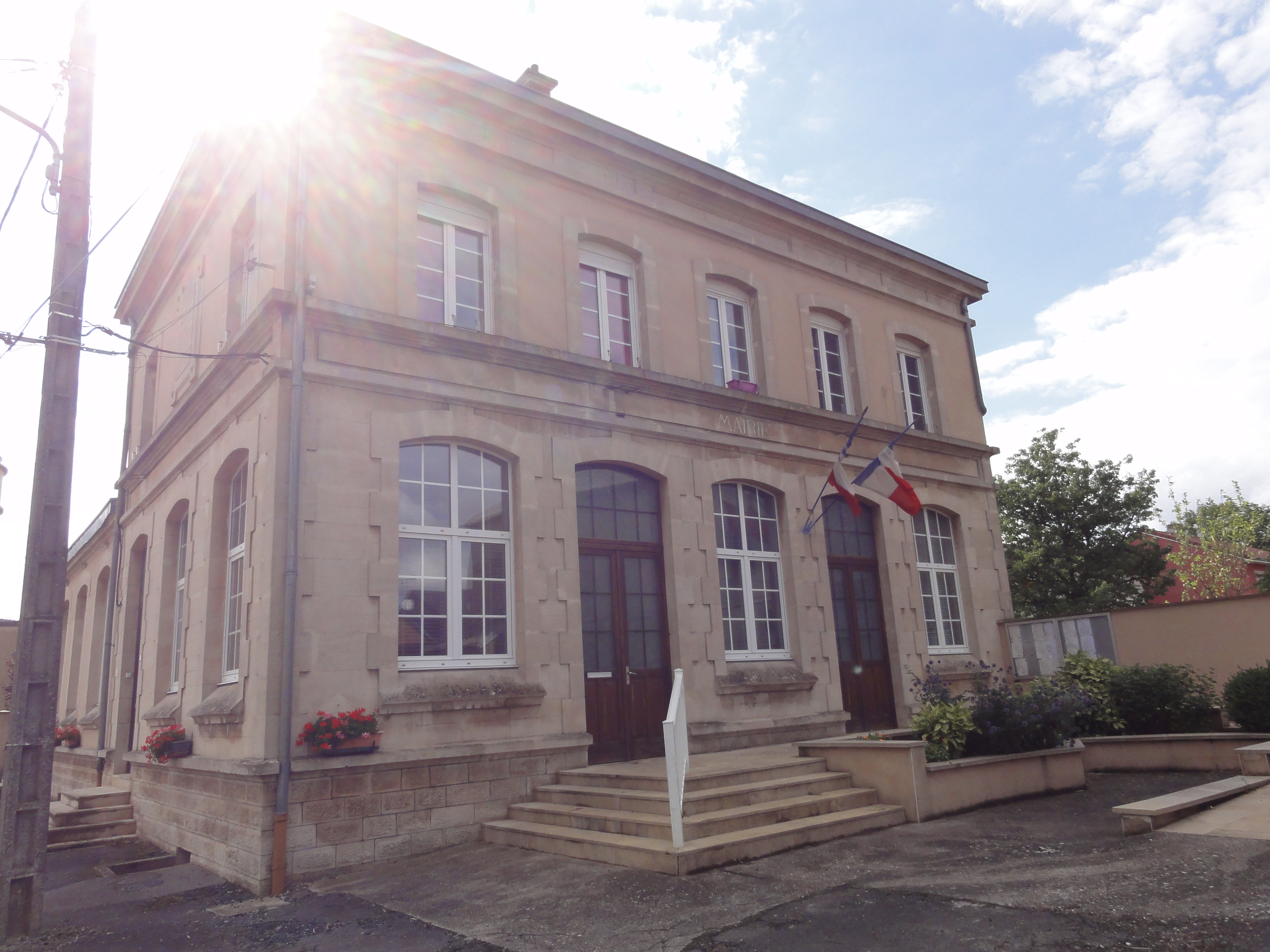
- The town hall in Bazailles

- Coat of arms
- Location of Bazailles
- Location within France Location within Grand Est
- Coordinates: 49°24′33″N 5°45′57″E
- Country: France
- Region: Grand Est
- Department: Meurthe-et-Moselle
- Arrondissement: Val-de-Briey
- Canton: Mont-Saint-Martin
- Intercommunality: Terre Lorraine du Longuyonnais

Government
  - Mayor (2020–2026): Pascal Moscato
- Area^{1}: 4.23 km^{2} (1.63 sq mi)
- Elevation: 327 m (1,073 ft)
- Highest elevation: 352 m (1,155 ft)
- Lowest elevation: 259 m (850 ft)
- Population (2023): 151
  - Density: 35.7/km^{2} (92.5/sq mi)
- Time zone: UTC+01:00 (CET)
  - Summer (DST): UTC+02:00 (CEST)
- INSEE/Postal code: 54056 /54620
- ^{1} French Land Register data, which excludes lakes, ponds, glaciers > 1 km^{2} (0.386 sq mi or 247 acres) and river estuaries.

Bazailles (French pronunciation: [bazaj]) is a commune in the Meurthe-et-Moselle department in northeastern France.

== Population ==
Historical population
Year	Pop.	±% p.a.
1968	222	—
1975	192	−2.05%
1982	193	+0.07%
1990	170	−1.57%
1999	196	+1.59%
2007	176	−1.34%
2012	153	−2.76%
2017	142	−1.48%
2023	151	+1.03%
Source: INSEE

== See also ==
- Communes of the Meurthe-et-Moselle department
