= Ville-Houdlémont =

- Commune
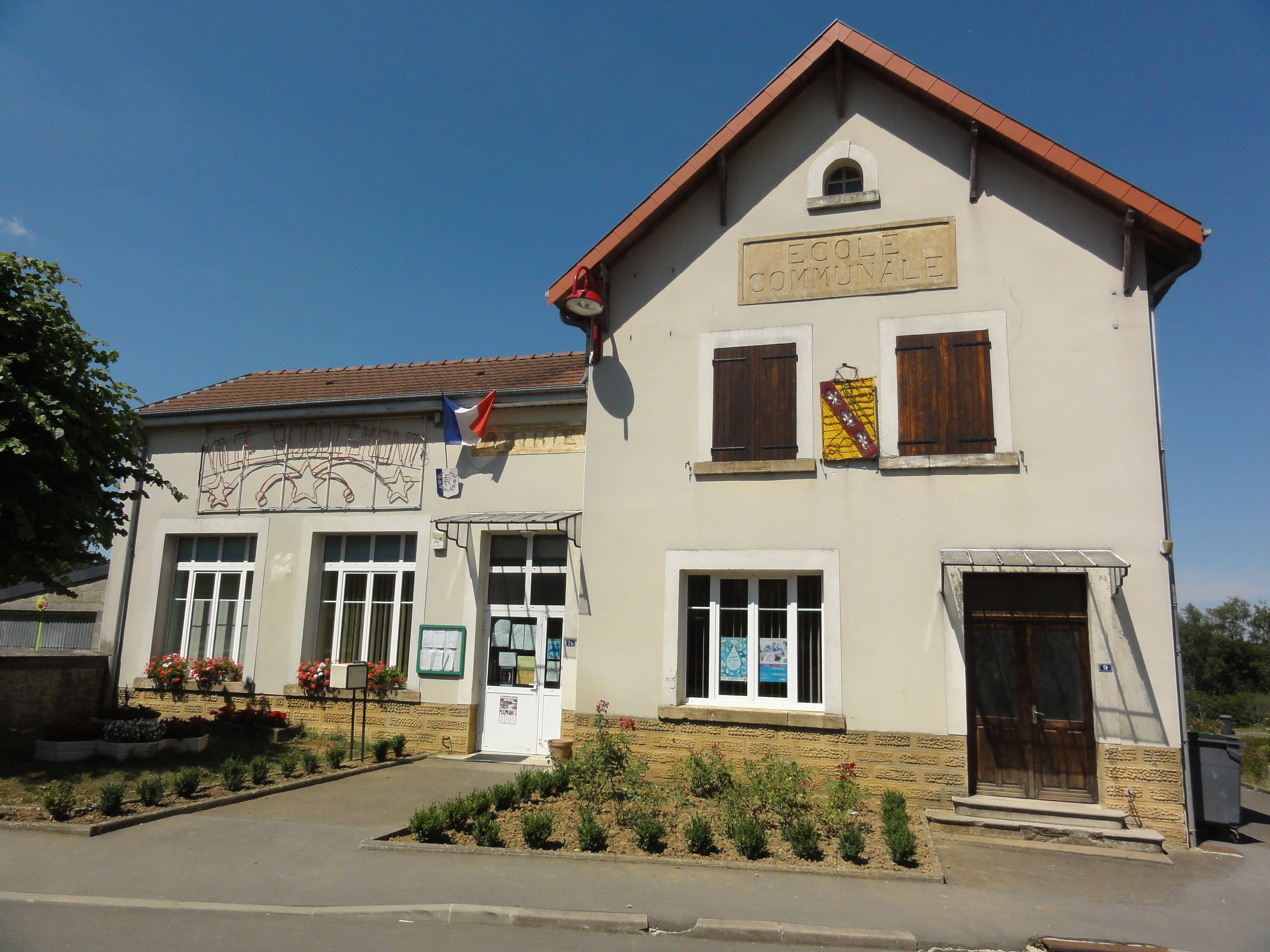
- The town hall and school in Ville-Houdlémont

- Coat of arms
- Location of Ville-Houdlémont
- Location within France Location within Grand Est
- Coordinates: 49°32′43″N 5°38′57″E
- Country: France
- Region: Grand Est
- Department: Meurthe-et-Moselle
- Arrondissement: Val-de-Briey
- Canton: Mont-Saint-Martin
- Intercommunality: CC Terre Lorraine du Longuyonnais

Government
  - Mayor (2020–2026): Laurent Verron
- Area^{1}: 6.09 km^{2} (2.35 sq mi)
- Elevation: 256 m (840 ft)
- Highest elevation: 394 m (1,293 ft)
- Lowest elevation: 222 m (728 ft)
- Population (2023): 772
  - Density: 127/km^{2} (328/sq mi)
- Time zone: UTC+01:00 (CET)
  - Summer (DST): UTC+02:00 (CEST)
- INSEE/Postal code: 54572 /54730
- ^{1} French Land Register data, which excludes lakes, ponds, glaciers > 1 km^{2} (0.386 sq mi or 247 acres) and river estuaries.

Ville-Houdlémont (French pronunciation: [vil udlemɔ̃]) is a commune in the Meurthe-et-Moselle department in north-eastern France.

== See also ==
- Communes of the Meurthe-et-Moselle department
