= Tellancourt =

- Commune
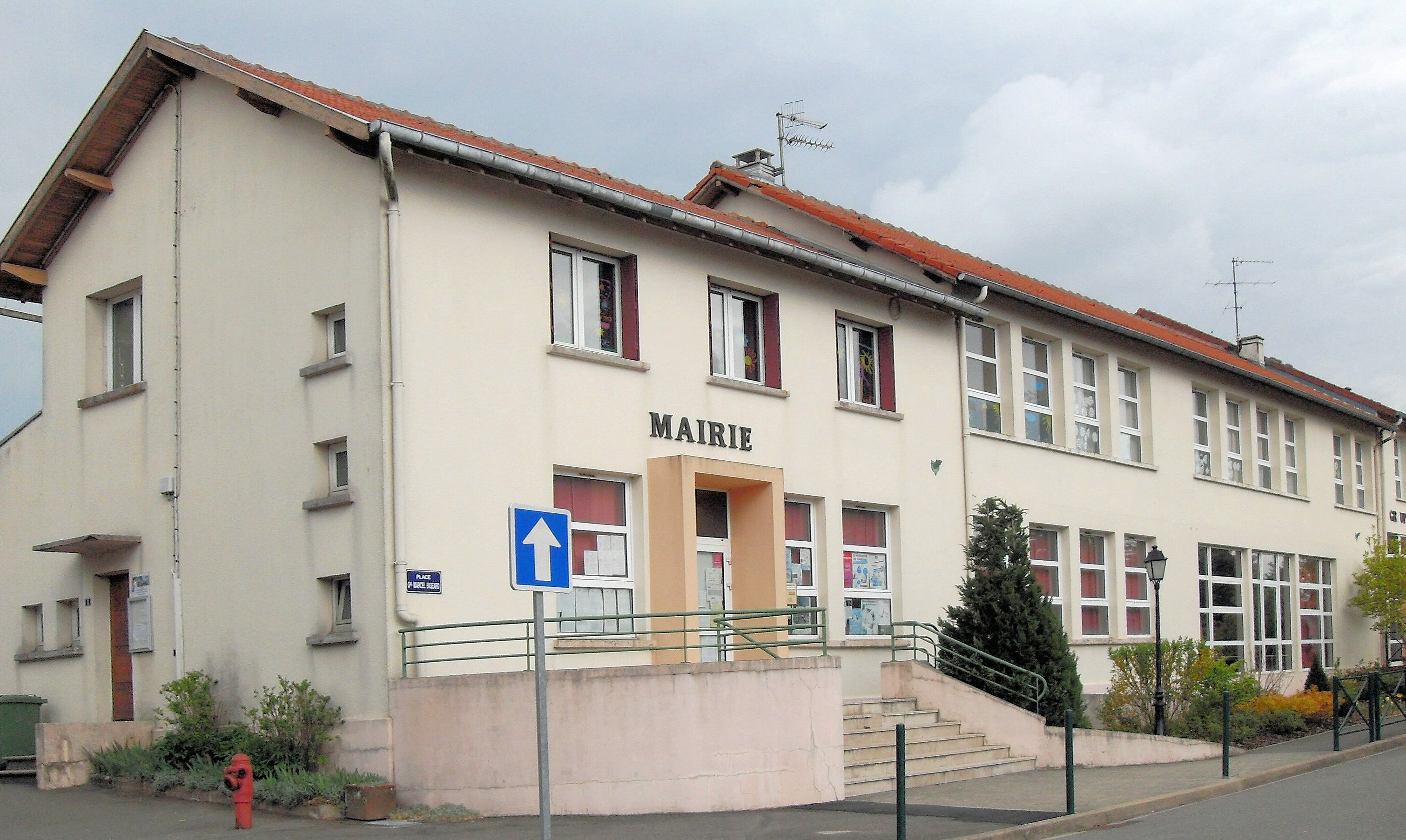
- The town hall

- Coat of arms
- Location of Tellancourt
- Location within France Location within Grand Est
- Coordinates: 49°30′31″N 5°38′03″E
- Country: France
- Region: Grand Est
- Department: Meurthe-et-Moselle
- Arrondissement: Val-de-Briey
- Canton: Mont-Saint-Martin
- Intercommunality: CC Terre Lorraine du Longuyonnais

Government
  - Mayor (2020–2026): Daniel Roeser
- Area^{1}: 3.76 km^{2} (1.45 sq mi)
- Elevation: 392 m (1,286 ft)
- Highest elevation: 403 m (1,322 ft)
- Lowest elevation: 335 m (1,099 ft)
- Population (2023): 633
  - Density: 168/km^{2} (436/sq mi)
- Time zone: UTC+01:00 (CET)
  - Summer (DST): UTC+02:00 (CEST)
- INSEE/Postal code: 54514 /54260
- ^{1} French Land Register data, which excludes lakes, ponds, glaciers > 1 km^{2} (0.386 sq mi or 247 acres) and river estuaries.

Tellancourt (French pronunciation: [tɛlɑ̃kuʁ]) is a commune in the Meurthe-et-Moselle department in Grand Est in north-eastern France.

== See also ==
- Communes of the Meurthe-et-Moselle department
