= Canton of Mont-Saint-Martin =

Canton in Grand Est, France

Coordinates: 49.54°N 5.79°E

The canton of Mont-Saint-Martin is an administrative division of the Meurthe-et-Moselle department, northeastern France. Its borders were modified at the French canton reorganisation which came into effect in March 2015. Its seat is in Mont-Saint-Martin.

It consists of the following communes:

1. Allondrelle-la-Malmaison
2. Baslieux
3. Bazailles
4. Beuveille
5. Boismont
6. Charency-Vezin
7. Colmey
8. Cons-la-Grandville
9. Cosnes-et-Romain
10. Doncourt-lès-Longuyon
11. Épiez-sur-Chiers
12. Fresnois-la-Montagne
13. Gorcy
14. Grand-Failly
15. Han-devant-Pierrepont
16. Longuyon
17. Montigny-sur-Chiers
18. Mont-Saint-Martin
19. Othe
20. Petit-Failly
21. Pierrepont
22. Saint-Jean-lès-Longuyon
23. Saint-Pancré
24. Saint-Supplet
25. Tellancourt
26. Ugny
27. Ville-au-Montois
28. Ville-Houdlémont
29. Villers-la-Chèvre
30. Villers-le-Rond
31. Villette
32. Viviers-sur-Chiers
