= Montigny-sur-Chiers =

- Commune
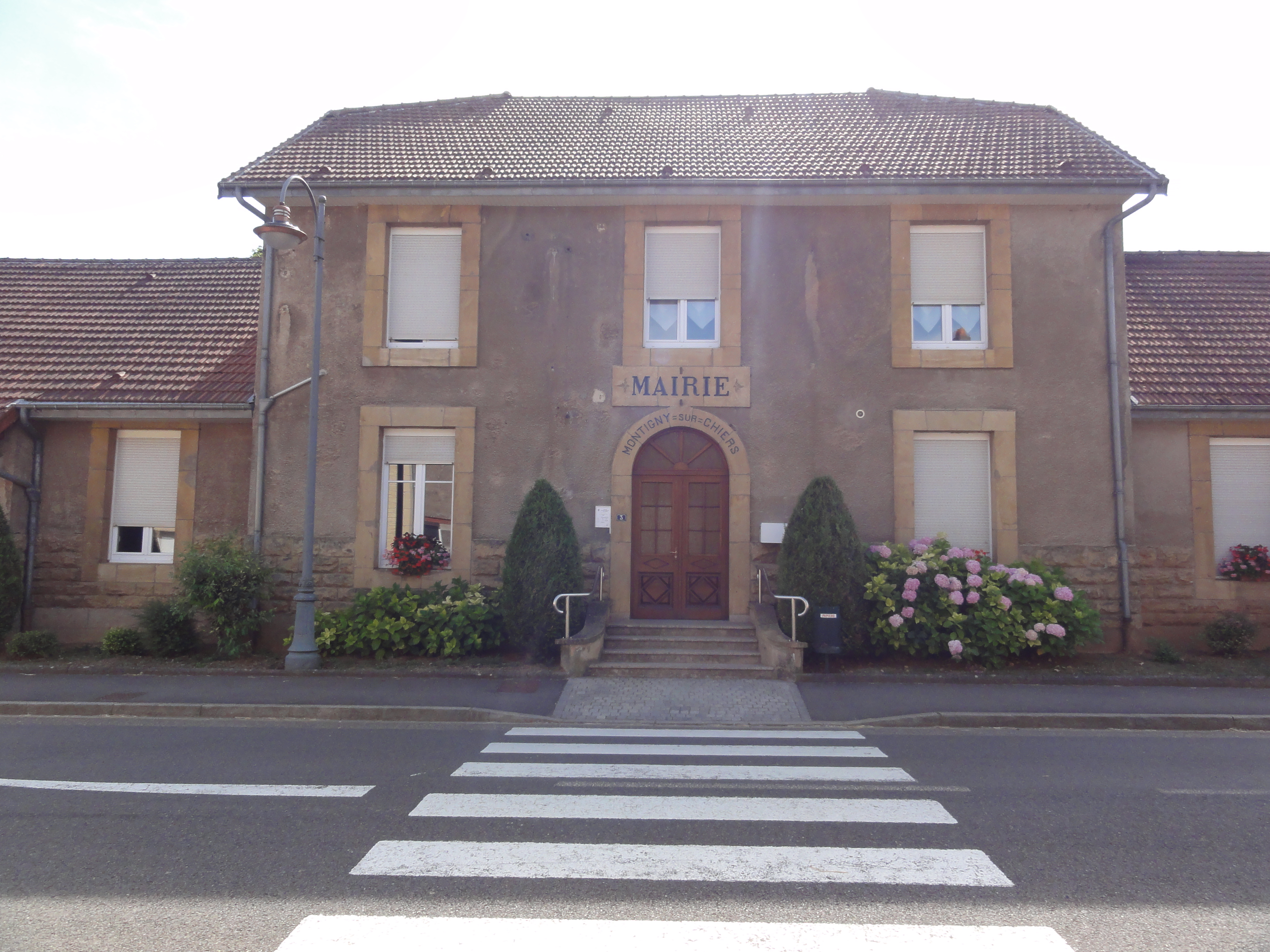
- The town hall in Montigny-sur-Chiers

- Coat of arms
- Location of Montigny-sur-Chiers
- Location within France Location within Grand Est
- Coordinates: 49°28′49″N 5°40′12″E
- Country: France
- Region: Grand Est
- Department: Meurthe-et-Moselle
- Arrondissement: Val-de-Briey
- Canton: Mont-Saint-Martin
- Intercommunality: CC Terre Lorraine du Longuyonnais

Government
  - Mayor (2020–2026): Jean-Jacques Pierret
- Area^{1}: 9.36 km^{2} (3.61 sq mi)
- Highest elevation: 351 m (1,152 ft)
- Lowest elevation: 217 m (712 ft)
- Population (2023): 486
  - Density: 51.9/km^{2} (134/sq mi)
- Time zone: UTC+01:00 (CET)
  - Summer (DST): UTC+02:00 (CEST)
- INSEE/Postal code: 54378 /54870
- ^{1} French Land Register data, which excludes lakes, ponds, glaciers > 1 km^{2} (0.386 sq mi or 247 acres) and river estuaries.

Montigny-sur-Chiers (French pronunciation: [mɔ̃tiɲi syʁ ʃjɛʁ], literally Montigny on Chiers) is a commune in the Meurthe-et-Moselle department in north-eastern France.

== See also ==
- Communes of the Meurthe-et-Moselle department
