= Colmey =

- Commune
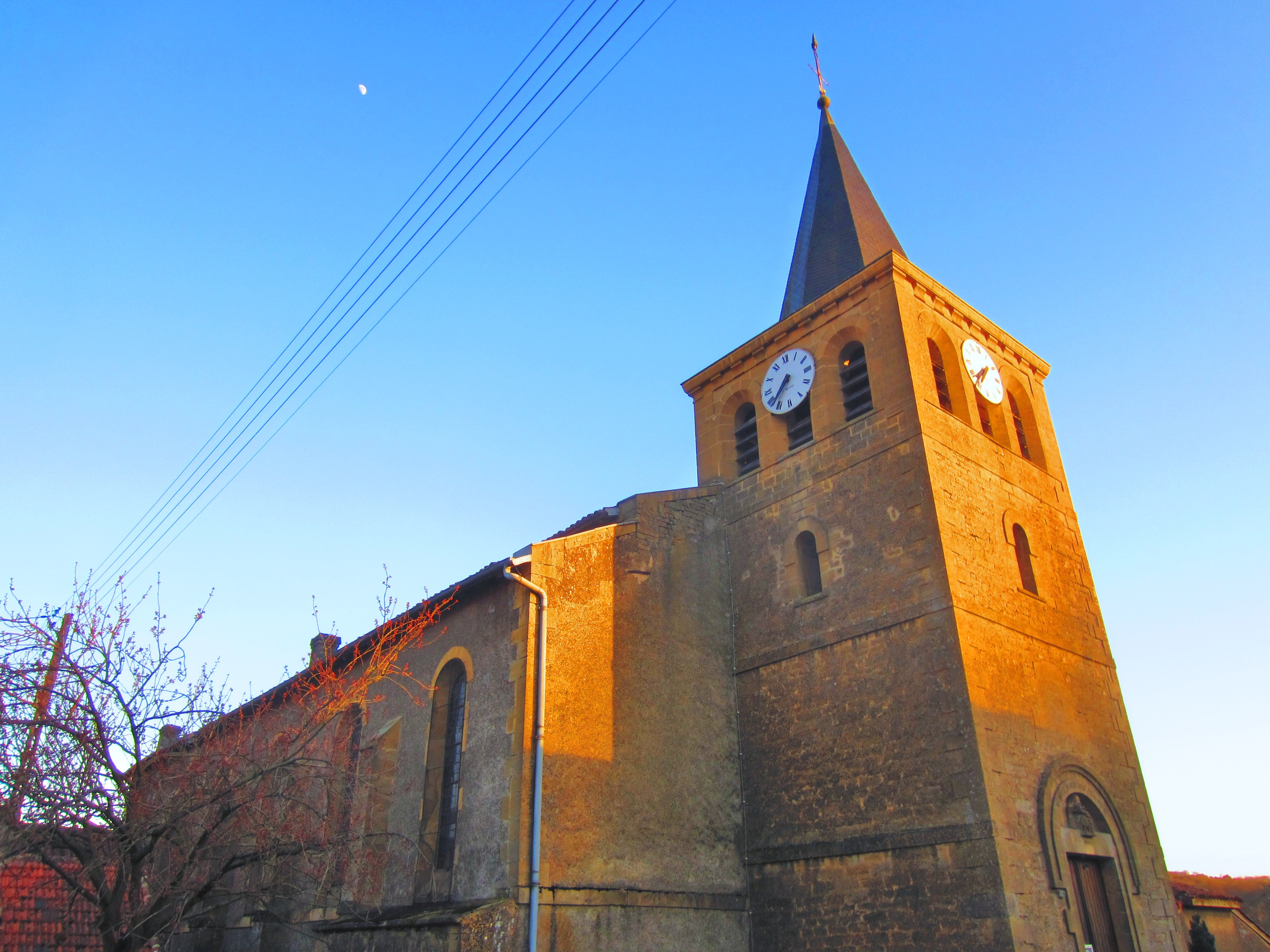
- The church in Colmey

- Coat of arms
- Location of Colmey
- Location within France Location within Grand Est
- Coordinates: 49°27′31″N 5°33′30″E
- Country: France
- Region: Grand Est
- Department: Meurthe-et-Moselle
- Arrondissement: Val-de-Briey
- Canton: Mont-Saint-Martin

Government
  - Mayor (2020–2026): François Didier
- Area^{1}: 9.9 km^{2} (3.8 sq mi)
- Elevation: 260 m (850 ft)
- Highest elevation: 352 m (1,155 ft)
- Lowest elevation: 197 m (646 ft)
- Population (2023): 248
  - Density: 25/km^{2} (65/sq mi)
- Time zone: UTC+01:00 (CET)
  - Summer (DST): UTC+02:00 (CEST)
- INSEE/Postal code: 54134 /54260
- ^{1} French Land Register data, which excludes lakes, ponds, glaciers > 1 km^{2} (0.386 sq mi or 247 acres) and river estuaries.

Colmey (French pronunciation: [kɔlmɛ]) is a commune in the Meurthe-et-Moselle department in north-eastern France.

== See also ==
- Communes of the Meurthe-et-Moselle department
