= Villette, Meurthe-et-Moselle =

Villette
- Commune
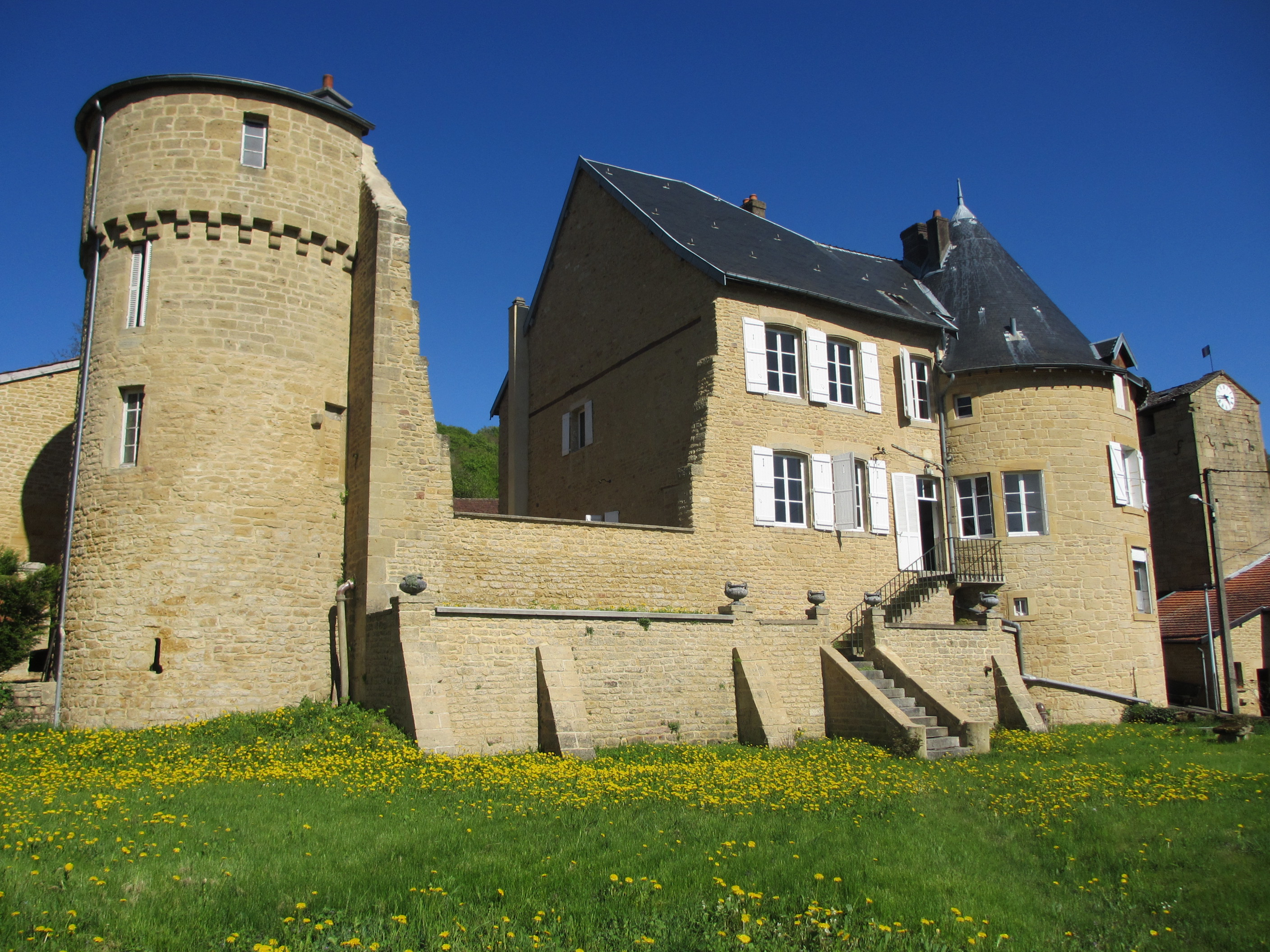
- The chateau in Villette

- Coat of arms
- Location of Villette
- Location within France Location within Grand Est
- Coordinates: 49°28′32″N 5°32′48″E
- Country: France
- Region: Grand Est
- Department: Meurthe-et-Moselle
- Arrondissement: Val-de-Briey
- Canton: Mont-Saint-Martin

Government
  - Mayor (2020–2026): Jean-Patrick Dalla Riva
- Area^{1}: 4.63 km^{2} (1.79 sq mi)
- Elevation: 200 m (660 ft)
- Highest elevation: 352 m (1,155 ft)
- Lowest elevation: 197 m (646 ft)
- Population (2023): 190
  - Density: 41/km^{2} (110/sq mi)
- Time zone: UTC+01:00 (CET)
  - Summer (DST): UTC+02:00 (CEST)
- INSEE/Postal code: 54582 /54260
- ^{1} French Land Register data, which excludes lakes, ponds, glaciers > 1 km^{2} (0.386 sq mi or 247 acres) and river estuaries.

Villette (French pronunciation: [vilɛt]) is a commune in the Meurthe-et-Moselle department in north-eastern France.

== Geography ==
=== Climate ===
Villette has an oceanic climate (Köppen climate classification Cfb). The average annual temperature in Villette is 10.1 °C (50.2 °F). The average annual rainfall is 909.4 mm (35.80 in) with December as the wettest month. The temperatures are highest on average in July, at around 18.4 °C (65.1 °F), and lowest in January, at around 1.9 °C (35.4 °F). The highest temperature ever recorded in Villette was 39.0 °C (102.2 °F) on 25 July 2019; the coldest temperature ever recorded was −14.8 °C (5.4 °F) on 20 December 2009.

Climate data for Villette (1991−2020 normals, extremes 1997−present)
Month	Jan	Feb	Mar	Apr	May	Jun	Jul	Aug	Sep	Oct	Nov	Dec	Year
Record high °C (°F)	15.2 (59.4)	20.3 (68.5)	23.9 (75.0)	27.1 (80.8)	31.0 (87.8)	34.1 (93.4)	39.0 (102.2)	37.8 (100.0)	33.3 (91.9)	25.9 (78.6)	19.1 (66.4)	15.4 (59.7)	39.0 (102.2)
Mean daily maximum °C (°F)	4.2 (39.6)	5.6 (42.1)	9.9 (49.8)	14.4 (57.9)	18.2 (64.8)	21.6 (70.9)	23.4 (74.1)	23.2 (73.8)	19.4 (66.9)	13.9 (57.0)	8.1 (46.6)	4.8 (40.6)	13.9 (57.0)
Daily mean °C (°F)	1.9 (35.4)	2.7 (36.9)	6.1 (43.0)	9.7 (49.5)	13.4 (56.1)	16.6 (61.9)	18.4 (65.1)	18.4 (65.1)	14.9 (58.8)	10.6 (51.1)	5.7 (42.3)	2.7 (36.9)	10.1 (50.2)
Mean daily minimum °C (°F)	−0.4 (31.3)	−0.1 (31.8)	2.3 (36.1)	5.1 (41.2)	8.6 (47.5)	11.6 (52.9)	13.3 (55.9)	13.5 (56.3)	10.5 (50.9)	7.2 (45.0)	3.3 (37.9)	0.6 (33.1)	6.3 (43.3)
Record low °C (°F)	−13.6 (7.5)	−13.8 (7.2)	−12.6 (9.3)	−6.9 (19.6)	−0.1 (31.8)	2.5 (36.5)	5.8 (42.4)	5.1 (41.2)	3.1 (37.6)	−3.7 (25.3)	−10.5 (13.1)	−14.8 (5.4)	−14.8 (5.4)
Average precipitation mm (inches)	87.5 (3.44)	70.8 (2.79)	67.4 (2.65)	55.4 (2.18)	74.3 (2.93)	70.4 (2.77)	76.3 (3.00)	81.0 (3.19)	61.3 (2.41)	82.3 (3.24)	82.0 (3.23)	100.7 (3.96)	909.4 (35.80)
Average precipitation days (≥ 1.0 mm)	13.3	11.7	11.3	9.8	11.0	9.8	10.5	9.8	9.0	11.8	13.7	14.7	136.5
Source: Météo-France

== See also ==
- Communes of the Meurthe-et-Moselle department
