= Han =

Han or HAN may refer to:

== People ==
=== Ethnic groups ===
- Han Chinese, or Han people (simplified Chinese: 汉人; traditional Chinese: 漢人), the largest ethnic group in China
  - Han Taiwanese (simplified Chinese: 台湾汉人; traditional Chinese: 臺灣漢人), the ethnic group of Taiwanese people who are fully or partially of Han Chinese descent
- Han minjok or Han people (한민족), the Korean native name referring to Koreans
- Hän, a First Nations people of Canada

=== Surname ===
- Han (Chinese surname)
- Han (Korean surname)
- Jefferson Han (born 1975), American research scientist
- Jiawei Han (born 1949), Chinese-American computer scientist
- Keiko Han (born 1953), Japanese voice actress
- Han Mei (musician), Chinese-Canadian musician
- Raymond Han (1931–2017), American painter

=== Given name ===
- Han (given name)

=== Other ===
- Han (musician), born Han Ji-sung, a South Korean singer-songwriter, rapper, and record producer, member of Stray Kids
- Hou Han (侯漢) (552), dynasty name used by Hou Jing during his brief usurpation of the Liang dynasty

== Fictional and mythological characters ==
=== Given name ===
- Han Fastolfe, in the Elijah Baley Robots series by Isaac Asimov
- Han Lue, from The Fast and the Furious series
- Han Pritcher, in the Foundation universe by Isaac Asimov
- Han Solo, in the Star Wars universe
- Han de Wit, titular character of a 1972 Dutch novel and 1990 movie

=== Surname ===
- Han Daewi, in the webtoon The God of High School
- Han Fu (fictional), in the novel Romance of the Three Kingdoms
- Han Qing-jao, from the Ender's Game series
- Han Tao, in Water Margin
- Han Tzu, from the Ender's Game series
- Han Xiangzi, Chinese mythological figure

== Places ==
=== Former states ===
- Han (NW Zhou state) (韓国) (11th century BC – 757 BC), a Chinese state in present-day Shaanxi
- Han (SE Zhou state) (邗国), a Chinese state in present-day Jiangsu
- Han (Warring States) (韓) (403 – 230 BC), a Chinese state during the Warring States period
- Han dynasty (漢/汉) (202 BC – 220 AD), a dynasty split into two eras, Western Han and Eastern Han
  - Shu Han (蜀漢) (221–263), a dynastic state that existed during the Three Kingdoms period
- Han-Zhao (漢趙) (304–329), one of the Sixteen Kingdoms, known as Han (漢) before 319
- Cheng-Han (成漢) (304–347), one of the Sixteen Kingdoms, known as Han (漢) after 338
- Former Shu (前蜀) (907–925), a state during the Five Dynasties and Ten Kingdoms period, known as Han (漢) between 917 and 918
- Southern Han (南漢) (917–971), a state during the Five Dynasties and Ten Kingdoms period
- Later Han (Five Dynasties) (後漢) (947–951), a state during the Five Dynasties and Ten Kingdoms period
  - Northern Han (北漢) (951–979), successor to Later Han, also during the Five Dynasties and Ten Kingdoms period
- Chen Han (漢) (1360–1364), an insurgent middle Yangtze state in the late Yuan dynasty
- Samhan (삼한; 三韓), three ancient confederacies in the southern Korean Peninsula

=== Modern places ===
- Hanguk (한국, 韓國) or Han (한, 韓), the South Korean name of Korea
- Han, Eskişehir, Turkey
- Han, Iran, a village in Sistan and Baluchestan Province
- Han River (disambiguation), several rivers
- Han-sur-Lesse, Rochefort, Belgium
- Han-devant-Pierrepont, Meurthe-et-Moselle, France
- Han-sur-Meuse, Meuse, France
- Han-sur-Nied, Moselle, France

== Languages ==
- Hän language, an indigenous language of North America
- Han Chinese language, or just Chinese
- Korean language (한국어 Hangug-eo), as known in South Korea
  - Han languages, a group of languages of ancient Korea
- Han, the ISO 639-3 code for the Hangaza language of Tanzania

=== Writing systems ===
- Hán, used in Vietnamese orthography
- Han characters, often referred to as Chinese characters

=== Other ===
- Hän, a Finnish 3rd person pronoun

== Transportation ==
- Hanwell railway station, in England, station code HAN
- Hindaun City railway station, in India, station code HAN
- Noi Bai International Airport, serving Hanoi, Vietnam, IATA code HAN
- BYD Han (汉), a Chinese passenger car

== Other uses ==
- Han school, Japan, Edo period
- HAN University of Applied Sciences, in the Netherlands
- Han, a robot created by robotics company Hanson Robotics
- Han (cultural) (한), a Korean cultural concept of lament
- Han (inn), also spelled khan, caravanserai
- Han (trilobite), a monotypic genus
- Han, the Chinese name of the star Zeta Ophiuchi
- Han Canal (邗溝), an early component of China's Grand Canal
- Han system (藩), a term for feudal clan or fief in Japan
- Health Alert Network of US CDC
- Home area network, in computing
- Hospitality Association of Namibia (HAN)
- Hydroxylammonium nitrate
- Khan (title), or Han (汗) in Chinese transliteration, originally Central Asian title for a sovereign or military ruler
- Type 091 submarine, Chinese nuclear submarine class
- "Han", a fifth season episode of The West Wing

== See also ==
- Thein Han (basketball) (born 1998), Burmese basketball player
- Hahn (disambiguation)
- Hans (disambiguation)
