= Othe =

- Commune
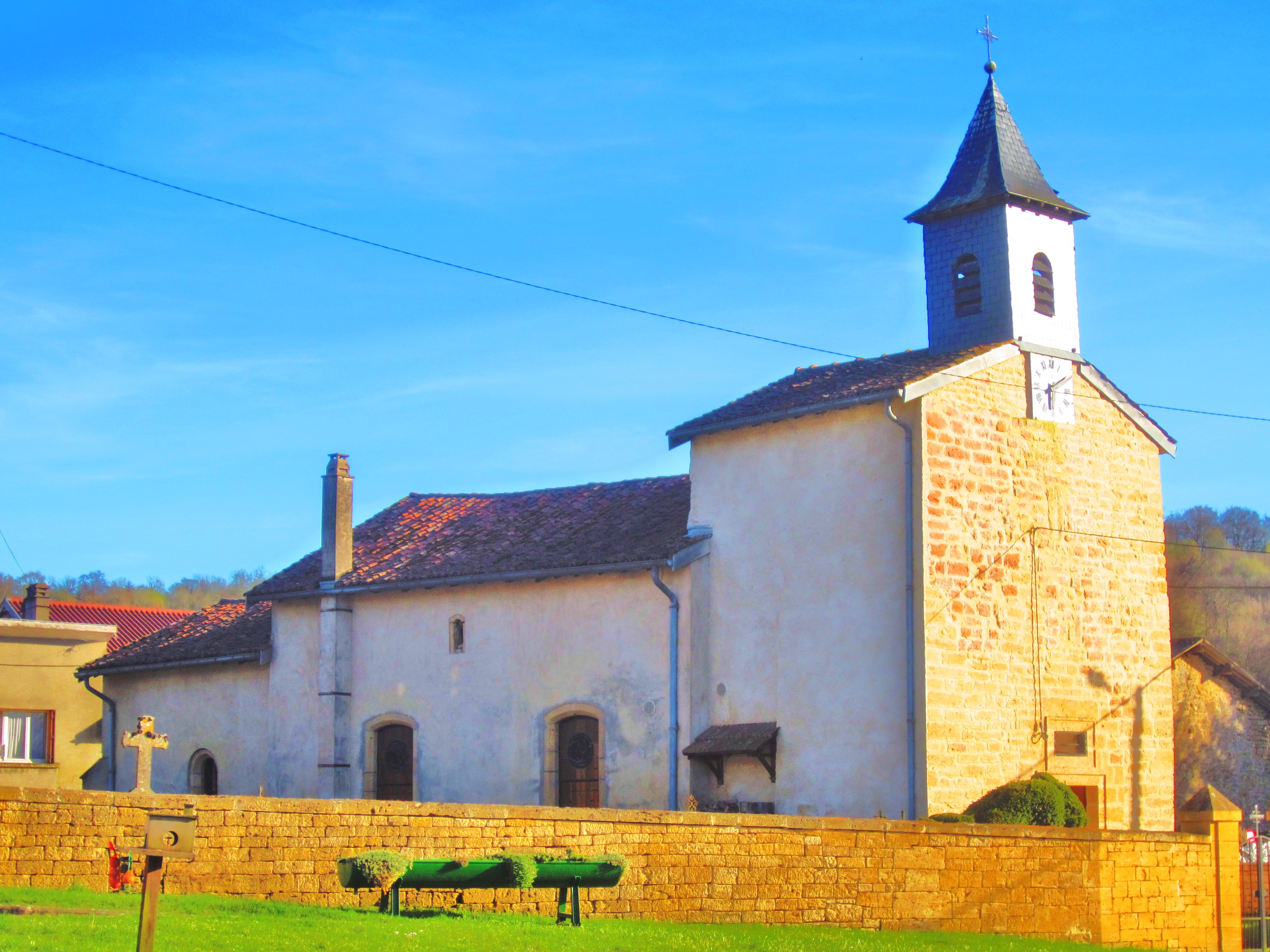
- The church in Othe

- Coat of arms
- Location of Othe
- Location within France Location within Grand Est
- Coordinates: 49°29′47″N 5°26′37″E
- Country: France
- Region: Grand Est
- Department: Meurthe-et-Moselle
- Arrondissement: Val-de-Briey
- Canton: Mont-Saint-Martin

Government
  - Mayor (2020–2026): Bernadette Delattre
- Area^{1}: 2.97 km^{2} (1.15 sq mi)
- Elevation: 200 m (660 ft)
- Highest elevation: 310 m (1,020 ft)
- Lowest elevation: 188 m (617 ft)
- Population (2023): 37
  - Density: 12/km^{2} (32/sq mi)
- Time zone: UTC+01:00 (CET)
  - Summer (DST): UTC+02:00 (CEST)
- INSEE/Postal code: 54412 /54260
- ^{1} French Land Register data, which excludes lakes, ponds, glaciers > 1 km^{2} (0.386 sq mi or 247 acres) and river estuaries.

Othe (French pronunciation: [ɔt]) is a commune in the Meurthe-et-Moselle department in north-eastern France. It is an exclave of the Meurthe-et-Moselle department, surrounded by the Meuse department.

== Geography ==
The village lies on the right bank of the Othain, which flows northwestward through the commune.

== See also ==
- Communes of the Meurthe-et-Moselle department
