= Han-sur-Nied =

- Commune
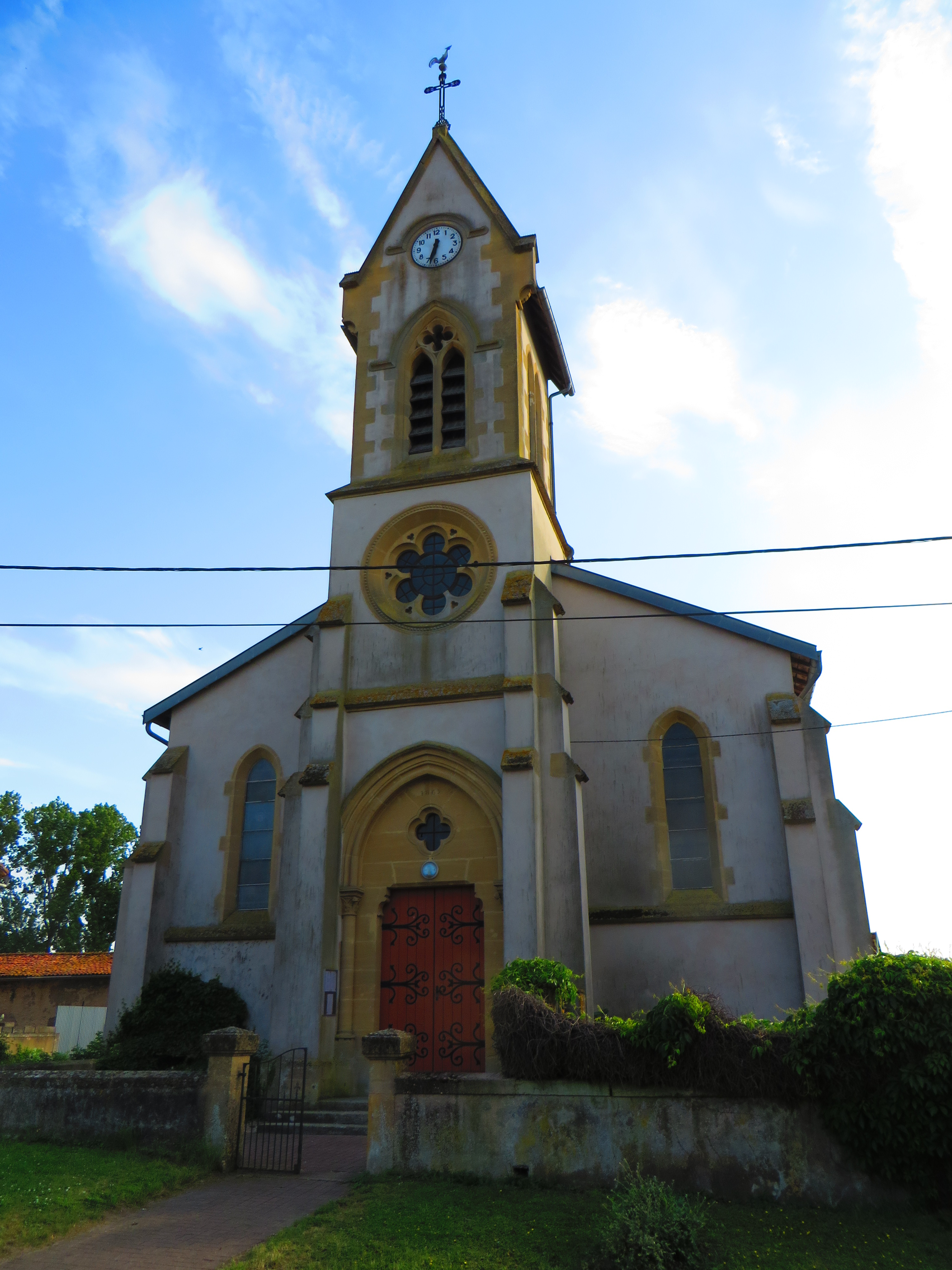
- The church in Han-sur-Nied

- Coat of arms
- Location of Han-sur-Nied
- Location within France Location within Grand Est
- Coordinates: 48°59′27″N 6°26′18″E
- Country: France
- Region: Grand Est
- Department: Moselle
- Arrondissement: Forbach-Boulay-Moselle
- Canton: Faulquemont
- Intercommunality: CC du District Urbain de Faulquemont

Government
  - Mayor (2023–2026): Sandra Pichon
- Area^{1}: 2.02 km^{2} (0.78 sq mi)
- Elevation: 230 m (750 ft)
- Highest elevation: 252 m (827 ft)
- Lowest elevation: 223 m (732 ft)
- Population (2023): 249
  - Density: 123/km^{2} (319/sq mi)
- Time zone: UTC+01:00 (CET)
  - Summer (DST): UTC+02:00 (CEST)
- INSEE/Postal code: 57293 /57580
- ^{1} French Land Register data, which excludes lakes, ponds, glaciers > 1 km^{2} (0.386 sq mi or 247 acres) and river estuaries.

Han-sur-Nied (French pronunciation: [ɑ̃ syʁ nje], literally Han on Nied; German: Han an der Nied) is a commune in the Moselle department in Grand Est in north-eastern France.

== See also ==
- Communes of the Moselle department
