= Charency-Vezin =

- Commune
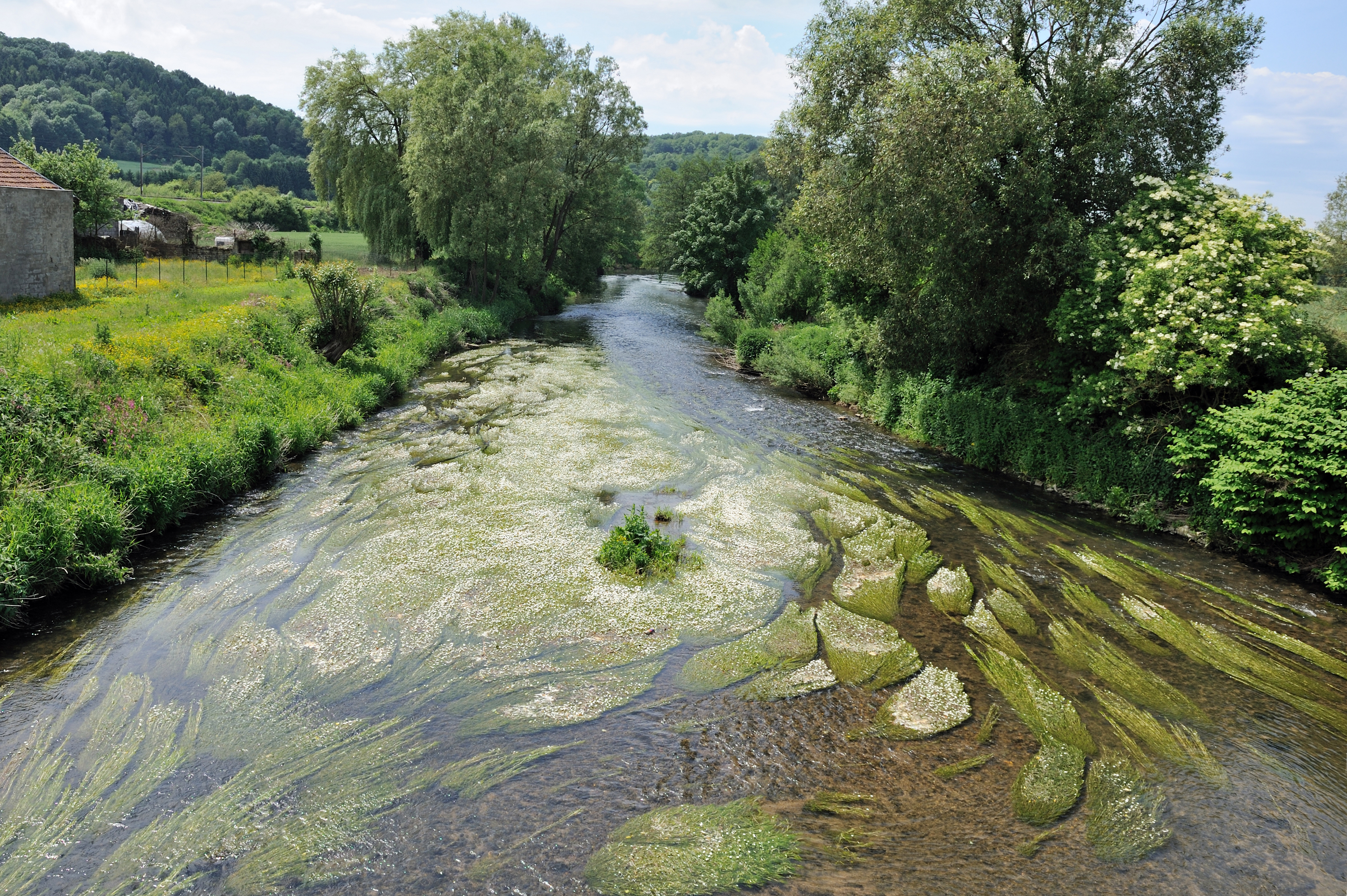
- The Chiers River in Charency-Vezin

- Coat of arms
- Location of Charency-Vezin
- Location within France Location within Grand Est
- Coordinates: 49°29′01″N 5°30′42″E
- Country: France
- Region: Grand Est
- Department: Meurthe-et-Moselle
- Arrondissement: Val-de-Briey
- Canton: Mont-Saint-Martin

Government
  - Mayor (2020–2026): Philippe Grethen
- Area^{1}: 14.79 km^{2} (5.71 sq mi)
- Elevation: 202 m (663 ft)
- Highest elevation: 365 m (1,198 ft)
- Lowest elevation: 192 m (630 ft)
- Population (2023): 625
  - Density: 42.3/km^{2} (109/sq mi)
- Time zone: UTC+01:00 (CET)
  - Summer (DST): UTC+02:00 (CEST)
- INSEE/Postal code: 54118 /54260
- ^{1} French Land Register data, which excludes lakes, ponds, glaciers > 1 km^{2} (0.386 sq mi or 247 acres) and river estuaries.

Charency-Vezin (French pronunciation: [ʃaʁɑ̃si vəzɛ̃]) is a commune in the Meurthe-et-Moselle department in north-eastern France.

== See also ==
- Communes of the Meurthe-et-Moselle department
