= Villers-la-Chèvre =

- Commune
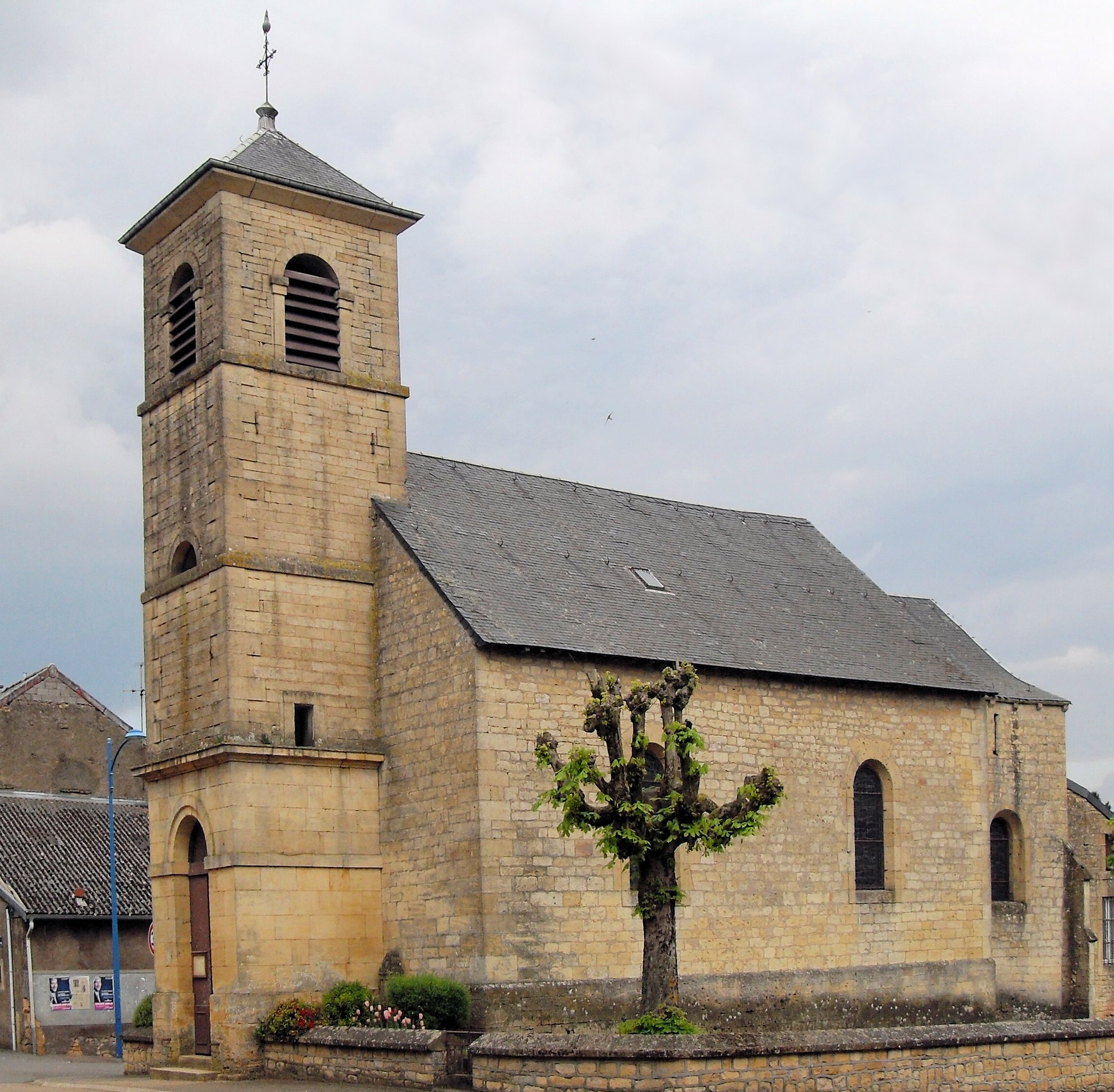
- The church in Villers-la-Chèvre

- Coat of arms
- Location of Villers-la-Chèvre
- Location within France Location within Grand Est
- Coordinates: 49°30′19″N 5°41′40″E
- Country: France
- Region: Grand Est
- Department: Meurthe-et-Moselle
- Arrondissement: Val-de-Briey
- Canton: Mont-Saint-Martin
- Intercommunality: CC Terre Lorraine du Longuyonnais

Government
  - Mayor (2020–2026): Alain Dye-Pellisson
- Area^{1}: 4.02 km^{2} (1.55 sq mi)
- Elevation: 360 m (1,180 ft)
- Highest elevation: 380 m (1,250 ft)
- Lowest elevation: 312 m (1,024 ft)
- Population (2023): 580
  - Density: 140/km^{2} (370/sq mi)
- Time zone: UTC+01:00 (CET)
  - Summer (DST): UTC+02:00 (CEST)
- INSEE/Postal code: 54574 /54870
- ^{1} French Land Register data, which excludes lakes, ponds, glaciers > 1 km^{2} (0.386 sq mi or 247 acres) and river estuaries.

Villers-la-Chèvre (French pronunciation: [vilɛʁ la ʃɛvʁ]; Luxembourgish: Gäässweller) is a commune in the Meurthe-et-Moselle department in north-eastern France.

== See also ==
- Communes of the Meurthe-et-Moselle department
