= Allondrelle-la-Malmaison =

- Commune
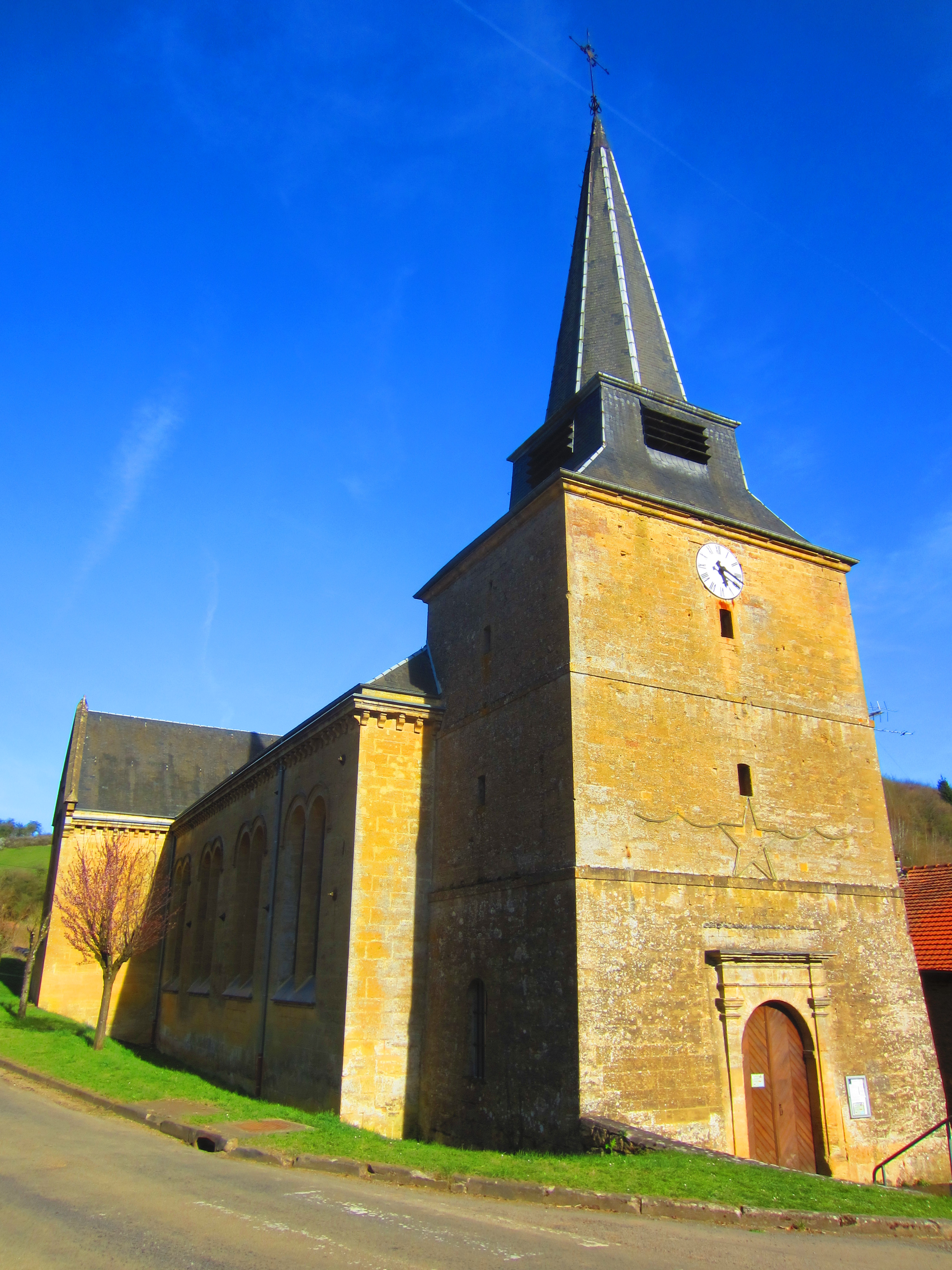
- The church in Allondrelle

- Coat of arms
- Location of Allondrelle-la-Malmaison
- Location within France Location within Grand Est
- Coordinates: 49°30′39″N 5°33′50″E
- Country: France
- Region: Grand Est
- Department: Meurthe-et-Moselle
- Arrondissement: Val-de-Briey
- Canton: Mont-Saint-Martin

Government
  - Mayor (2020–2026): Jean-François Mariemberg
- Area^{1}: 13.61 km^{2} (5.25 sq mi)
- Elevation: 340 m (1,120 ft)
- Highest elevation: 396 m (1,299 ft)
- Lowest elevation: 230 m (750 ft)
- Population (2023): 635
  - Density: 46.7/km^{2} (121/sq mi)
- Time zone: UTC+01:00 (CET)
  - Summer (DST): UTC+02:00 (CEST)
- INSEE/Postal code: 54011 /54260
- ^{1} French Land Register data, which excludes lakes, ponds, glaciers > 1 km^{2} (0.386 sq mi or 247 acres) and river estuaries.

Allondrelle-la-Malmaison (French pronunciation: [alɔ̃dʁɛl la malmɛzɔ̃]) is a commune in the Meurthe-et-Moselle department in northeastern France.

== Population ==
Historical population
Year	Pop.	±% p.a.
1968	560	—
1975	513	−1.24%
1982	483	−0.86%
1990	481	−0.05%
1999	519	+0.85%
2007	617	+2.19%
2012	619	+0.06%
2017	644	+0.80%
2023	635	−0.23%
Source: INSEE

== See also ==
- Communes of the Meurthe-et-Moselle department
