= Fresnois-la-Montagne =

- Commune
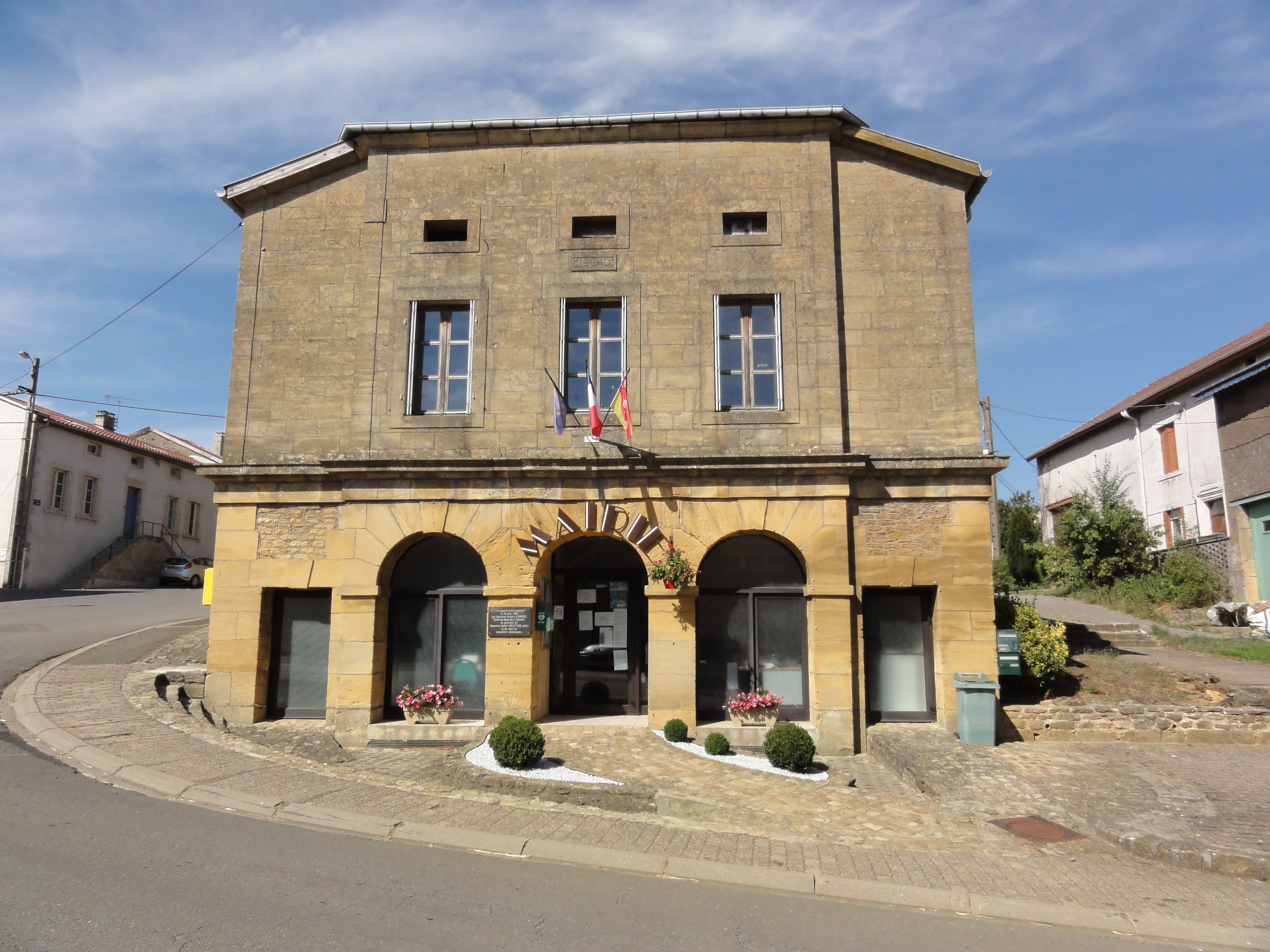
- The town hall in Fresnois-la-Montagne

- Coat of arms
- Location of Fresnois-la-Montagne
- Location within France Location within Grand Est
- Coordinates: 49°29′41″N 5°38′48″E
- Country: France
- Region: Grand Est
- Department: Meurthe-et-Moselle
- Arrondissement: Val-de-Briey
- Canton: Mont-Saint-Martin
- Intercommunality: CC Terre Lorraine du Longuyonnais

Government
  - Mayor (2020–2026): Jean-Luc Thomas
- Area^{1}: 8.59 km^{2} (3.32 sq mi)
- Elevation: 330 m (1,080 ft)
- Highest elevation: 397 m (1,302 ft)
- Lowest elevation: 280 m (920 ft)
- Population (2023): 415
  - Density: 48.3/km^{2} (125/sq mi)
- Time zone: UTC+01:00 (CET)
  - Summer (DST): UTC+02:00 (CEST)
- INSEE/Postal code: 54212 /54260
- ^{1} French Land Register data, which excludes lakes, ponds, glaciers > 1 km^{2} (0.386 sq mi or 247 acres) and river estuaries.

Fresnois-la-Montagne (French pronunciation: [fʁɛnwa la mɔ̃taɲ]) is a commune in the Meurthe-et-Moselle department in north-eastern France.

== See also ==
- Communes of the Meurthe-et-Moselle department
