= Saint-Jean-lès-Longuyon =

- Commune
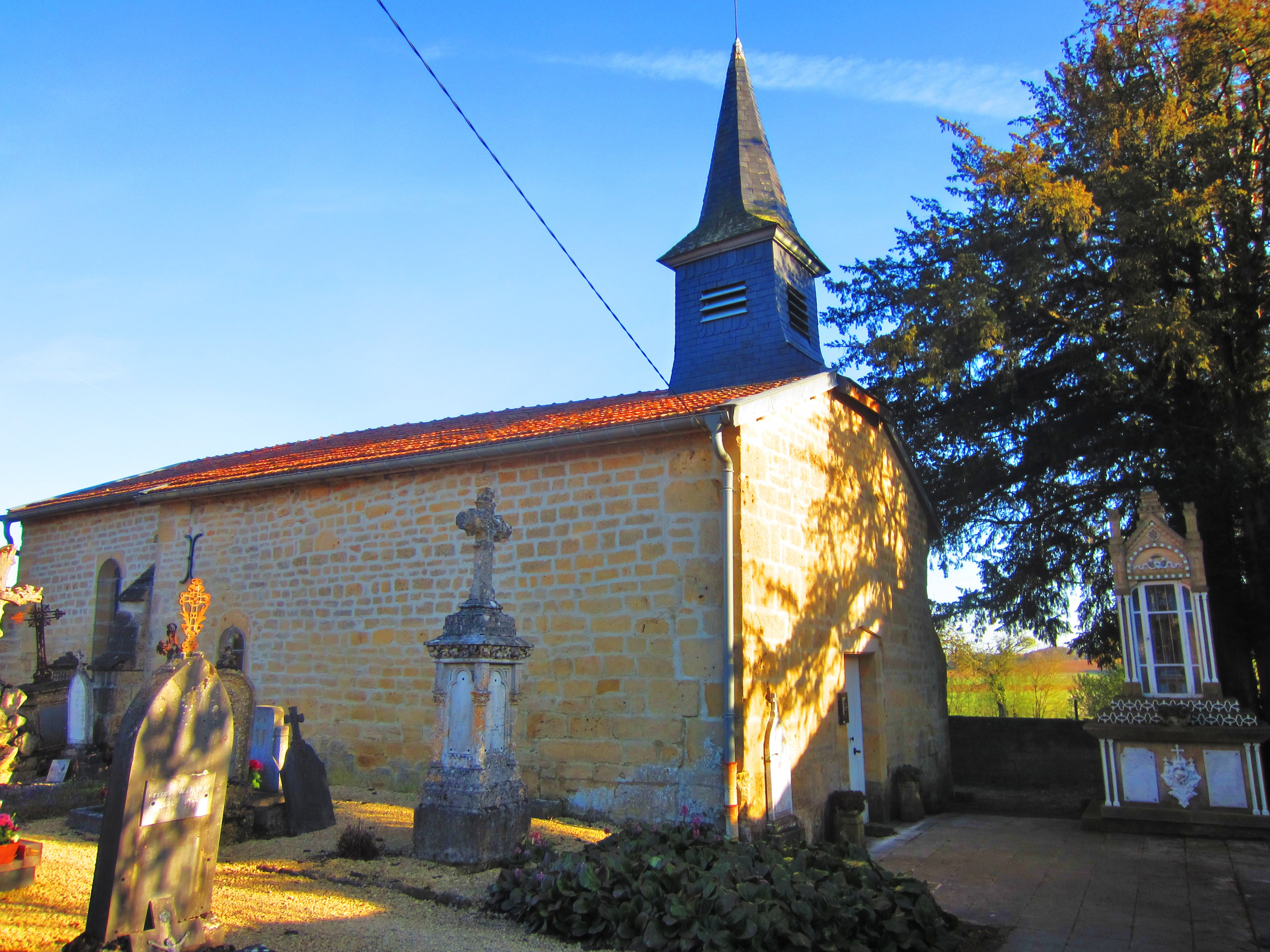
- The church in Saint-Jean-lès-Longuyon

- Coat of arms
- Location of Saint-Jean-lès-Longuyon
- Location within France Location within Grand Est
- Coordinates: 49°27′16″N 5°27′56″E
- Country: France
- Region: Grand Est
- Department: Meurthe-et-Moselle
- Arrondissement: Val-de-Briey
- Canton: Mont-Saint-Martin

Government
  - Mayor (2020–2026): Alain Sirot
- Area^{1}: 4.21 km^{2} (1.63 sq mi)
- Elevation: 210 m (690 ft)
- Highest elevation: 313 m (1,027 ft)
- Lowest elevation: 198 m (650 ft)
- Population (2023): 412
  - Density: 97.9/km^{2} (253/sq mi)
- Time zone: UTC+01:00 (CET)
  - Summer (DST): UTC+02:00 (CEST)
- INSEE/Postal code: 54476 /54260
- ^{1} French Land Register data, which excludes lakes, ponds, glaciers > 1 km^{2} (0.386 sq mi or 247 acres) and river estuaries.

Saint-Jean-lès-Longuyon (French pronunciation: [sɛ̃ ʒɑ̃ lɛ lɔ̃ɡɥijɔ̃], literally Saint-Jean near Longuyon) is a commune in the Meurthe-et-Moselle department in north-eastern France.

== Geography ==
The village lies on the right bank of the Othain, which forms all of the commune's western border.

== See also ==
- Communes of the Meurthe-et-Moselle department
