= Viviers-sur-Chiers =

- Commune
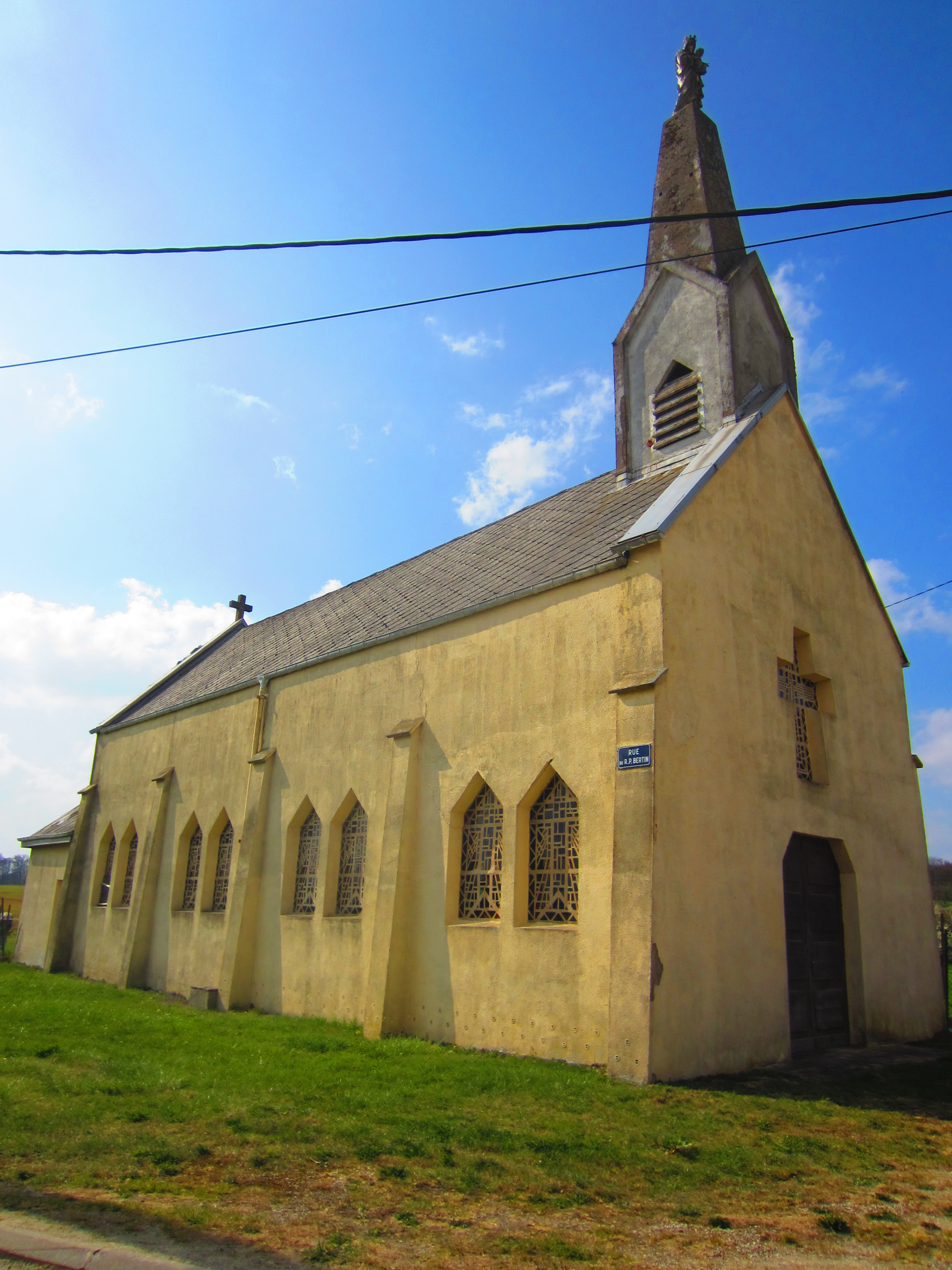
- The Revemont chapel in Viviers-sur-Chiers

- Coat of arms
- Location of Viviers-sur-Chiers
- Location within France Location within Grand Est
- Coordinates: 49°28′26″N 5°38′03″E
- Country: France
- Region: Grand Est
- Department: Meurthe-et-Moselle
- Arrondissement: Val-de-Briey
- Canton: Mont-Saint-Martin
- Intercommunality: Terre Lorraine du Longuyonnais

Government
  - Mayor (2023–2026): Elisabeth Heil
- Area^{1}: 16.24 km^{2} (6.27 sq mi)
- Elevation: 228 m (748 ft)
- Highest elevation: 382 m (1,253 ft)
- Lowest elevation: 211 m (692 ft)
- Population (2023): 657
  - Density: 40.5/km^{2} (105/sq mi)
- Time zone: UTC+01:00 (CET)
  - Summer (DST): UTC+02:00 (CEST)
- INSEE/Postal code: 54590 /54260
- ^{1} French Land Register data, which excludes lakes, ponds, glaciers > 1 km^{2} (0.386 sq mi or 247 acres) and river estuaries.

Viviers-sur-Chiers (French pronunciation: [vivje syʁ ʃjɛʁ], literally Viviers on Chiers) is a commune in the Meurthe-et-Moselle department in north-eastern France.

== See also ==
- Communes of the Meurthe-et-Moselle department
