= Han-devant-Pierrepont =

- Commune
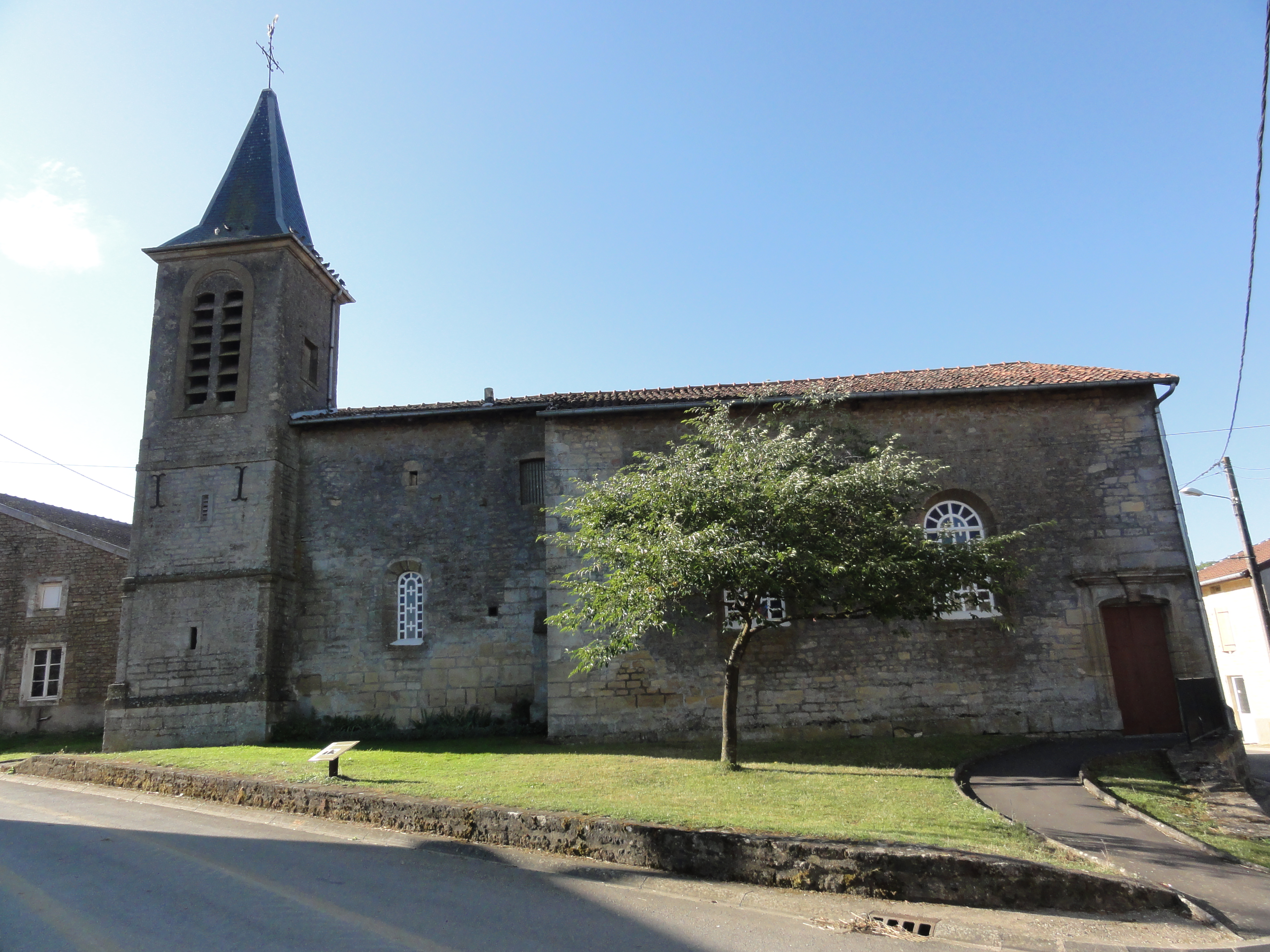
- The church in Han-devant-Pierrepont

- Coat of arms
- Location of Han-devant-Pierrepont
- Location within France Location within Grand Est
- Coordinates: 49°23′53″N 5°42′27″E
- Country: France
- Region: Grand Est
- Department: Meurthe-et-Moselle
- Arrondissement: Val-de-Briey
- Canton: Mont-Saint-Martin
- Intercommunality: CC Terre Lorraine du Longuyonnais

Government
  - Mayor (2020–2026): Jérémy Thomas
- Area^{1}: 4.96 km^{2} (1.92 sq mi)
- Highest elevation: 323 m (1,060 ft)
- Lowest elevation: 234 m (768 ft)
- Population (2023): 144
  - Density: 29.0/km^{2} (75.2/sq mi)
- Time zone: UTC+01:00 (CET)
  - Summer (DST): UTC+02:00 (CEST)
- INSEE/Postal code: 54602 /54620
- ^{1} French Land Register data, which excludes lakes, ponds, glaciers > 1 km^{2} (0.386 sq mi or 247 acres) and river estuaries.

Han-devant-Pierrepont (French pronunciation: [ɑ̃ dəvɑ̃ pjɛʁpɔ̃], literally Han before Pierrepont) is a commune in the Meurthe-et-Moselle department in north-eastern France. Before 1997, it was part of the Meuse department.

== See also ==
- Communes of the Meurthe-et-Moselle department
