= Épiez-sur-Chiers =

- Commune
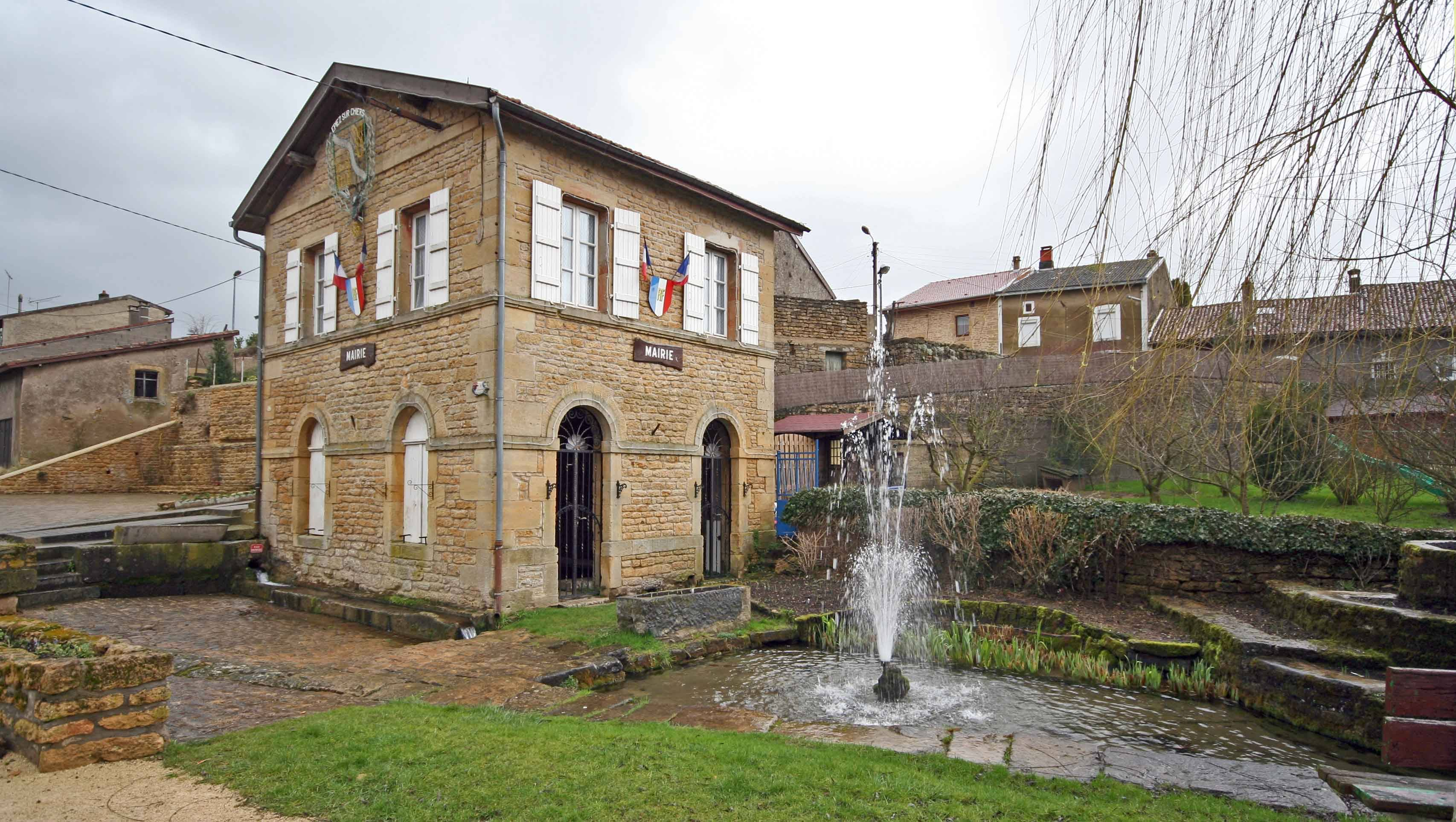
- Town hall and surroundings

- Coat of arms
- Location of Épiez-sur-Chiers
- Location within France Location within Grand Est
- Coordinates: 49°29′33″N 5°30′19″E
- Country: France
- Region: Grand Est
- Department: Meurthe-et-Moselle
- Arrondissement: Val-de-Briey
- Canton: Mont-Saint-Martin

Government
  - Mayor (2020–2026): James Weiss
- Area^{1}: 5.19 km^{2} (2.00 sq mi)
- Elevation: 190 m (620 ft)
- Highest elevation: 360 m (1,180 ft)
- Lowest elevation: 189 m (620 ft)
- Population (2023): 192
  - Density: 37.0/km^{2} (95.8/sq mi)
- Time zone: UTC+01:00 (CET)
  - Summer (DST): UTC+02:00 (CEST)
- INSEE/Postal code: 54178 /54260
- ^{1} French Land Register data, which excludes lakes, ponds, glaciers > 1 km^{2} (0.386 sq mi or 247 acres) and river estuaries.

Épiez-sur-Chiers (French pronunciation: [epje syʁ ʃjɛʁ], literally Épiez on Chiers) is a commune in the Meurthe-et-Moselle department in north-eastern France.

== See also ==
- Communes of the Meurthe-et-Moselle department
