= Saint-Pancré =

- Commune
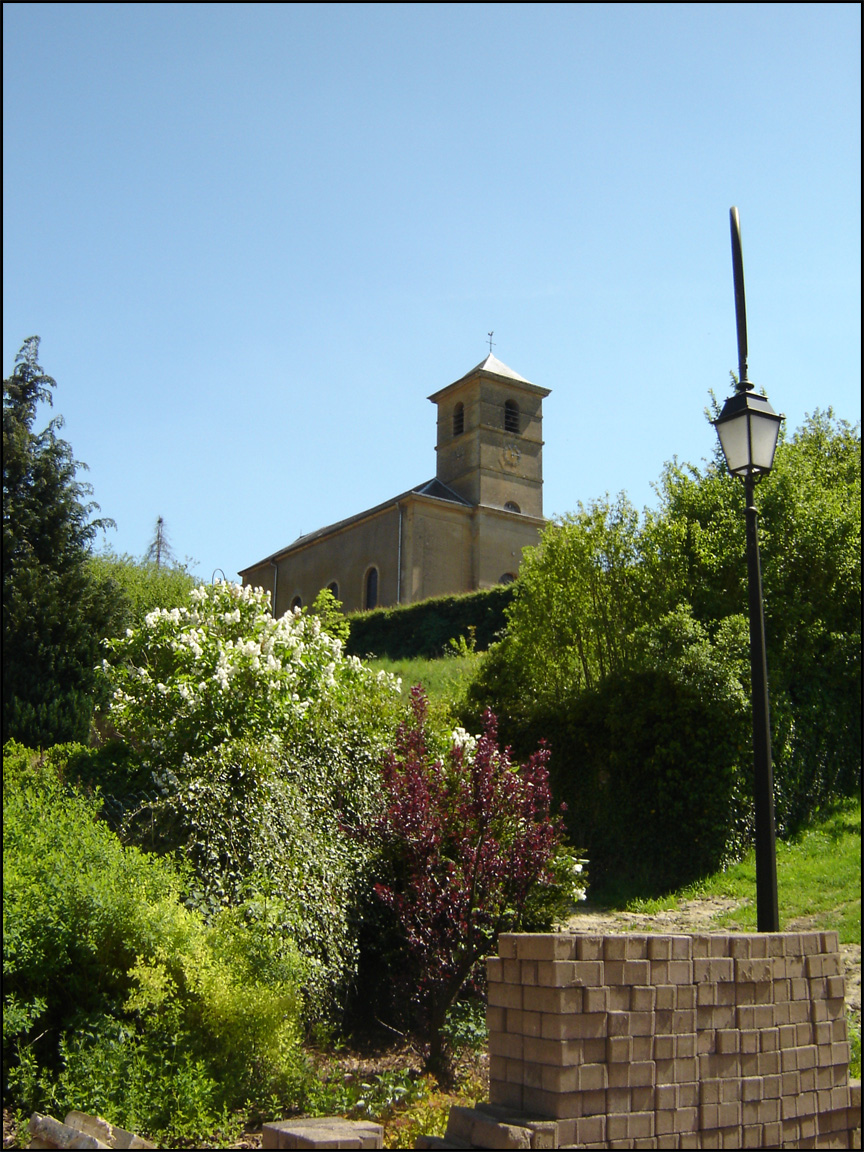
- The church

- Coat of arms
- Location of Saint-Pancré
- Location within France Location within Grand Est
- Coordinates: 49°31′48″N 5°38′56″E
- Country: France
- Region: Grand Est
- Department: Meurthe-et-Moselle
- Arrondissement: Val-de-Briey
- Canton: Mont-Saint-Martin
- Intercommunality: Terre Lorraine du Longuyonnais

Government
  - Mayor (2020–2026): René Saunier
- Area^{1}: 6.13 km^{2} (2.37 sq mi)
- Elevation: 260 m (850 ft)
- Highest elevation: 400 m (1,300 ft)
- Lowest elevation: 230 m (750 ft)
- Population (2023): 307
  - Density: 50.1/km^{2} (130/sq mi)
- Time zone: UTC+01:00 (CET)
  - Summer (DST): UTC+02:00 (CEST)
- INSEE/Postal code: 54485 /54730
- ^{1} French Land Register data, which excludes lakes, ponds, glaciers > 1 km^{2} (0.386 sq mi or 247 acres) and river estuaries.

Saint-Pancré (French pronunciation: [sɛ̃ pɑ̃kʁe]) is a commune in the Meurthe-et-Moselle department in north-eastern France.

== Population ==
Historical population
Year	Pop.	±% p.a.
1968	267	—
1975	271	+0.21%
1982	276	+0.26%
1990	270	−0.27%
1999	283	+0.52%
2007	305	+0.94%
2012	321	+1.03%
2017	316	−0.31%
2023	307	−0.48%
Source: INSEE

== See also ==
- Communes of the Meurthe-et-Moselle department
