= Boismont, Meurthe-et-Moselle =

Boismont
- Commune
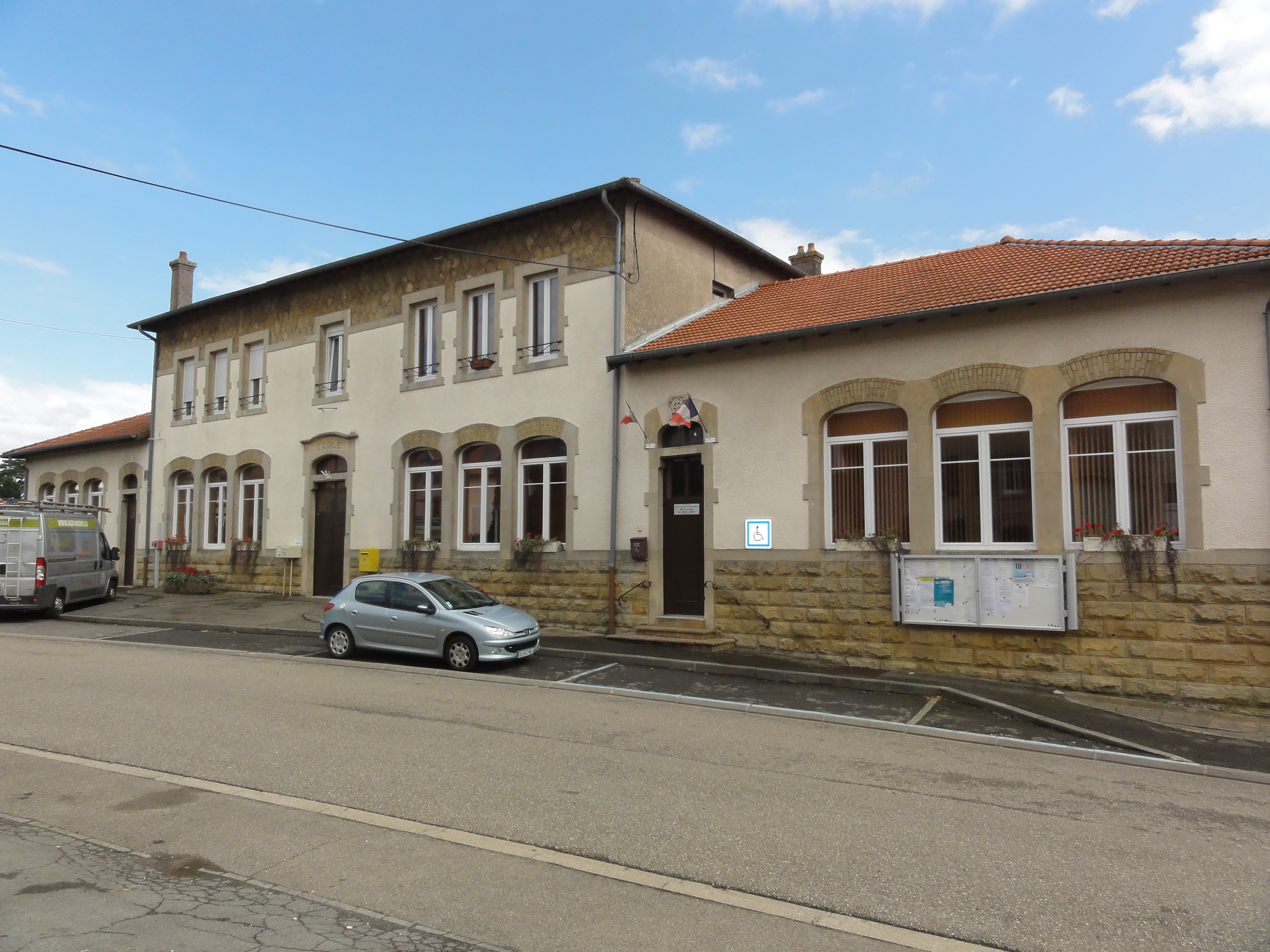
- The town hall in Boismont

- Coat of arms
- Location of Boismont
- Location within France Location within Grand Est
- Coordinates: 49°24′25″N 5°44′25″E
- Country: France
- Region: Grand Est
- Department: Meurthe-et-Moselle
- Arrondissement: Val-de-Briey
- Canton: Mont-Saint-Martin
- Intercommunality: Terre Lorraine du Longuyonnais

Government
  - Mayor (2020–2026): Marie-Laure Bellora
- Area^{1}: 5.43 km^{2} (2.10 sq mi)
- Elevation: 300 m (980 ft)
- Highest elevation: 350 m (1,150 ft)
- Lowest elevation: 233 m (764 ft)
- Population (2023): 410
  - Density: 76/km^{2} (200/sq mi)
- Time zone: UTC+01:00 (CET)
  - Summer (DST): UTC+02:00 (CEST)
- INSEE/Postal code: 54081 /54620
- ^{1} French Land Register data, which excludes lakes, ponds, glaciers > 1 km^{2} (0.386 sq mi or 247 acres) and river estuaries.

Boismont (French pronunciation: [bwamɔ̃]) is a commune in the Meurthe-et-Moselle department in northeastern France.

== Population ==
Historical population
Year	Pop.	±% p.a.
1968	525	—
1975	474	−1.45%
1982	378	−3.18%
1990	437	+1.83%
1999	456	+0.47%
2007	459	+0.08%
2012	457	−0.09%
2017	415	−1.91%
2023	410	−0.20%
Source: INSEE

== See also ==
- Communes of the Meurthe-et-Moselle department
