= Han Gang =

Han Gang may refer to:

- Han Gang (athlete) (born 1978), Chinese marathon runner
- Han Kang (born 1970), South Korean writer (Han Gang is the Revised Romanization form of Han Kang)

== See also ==
- Han River (Korea), a major river in South Korea known as the Hangang
