= Villers-le-Rond =

- Commune
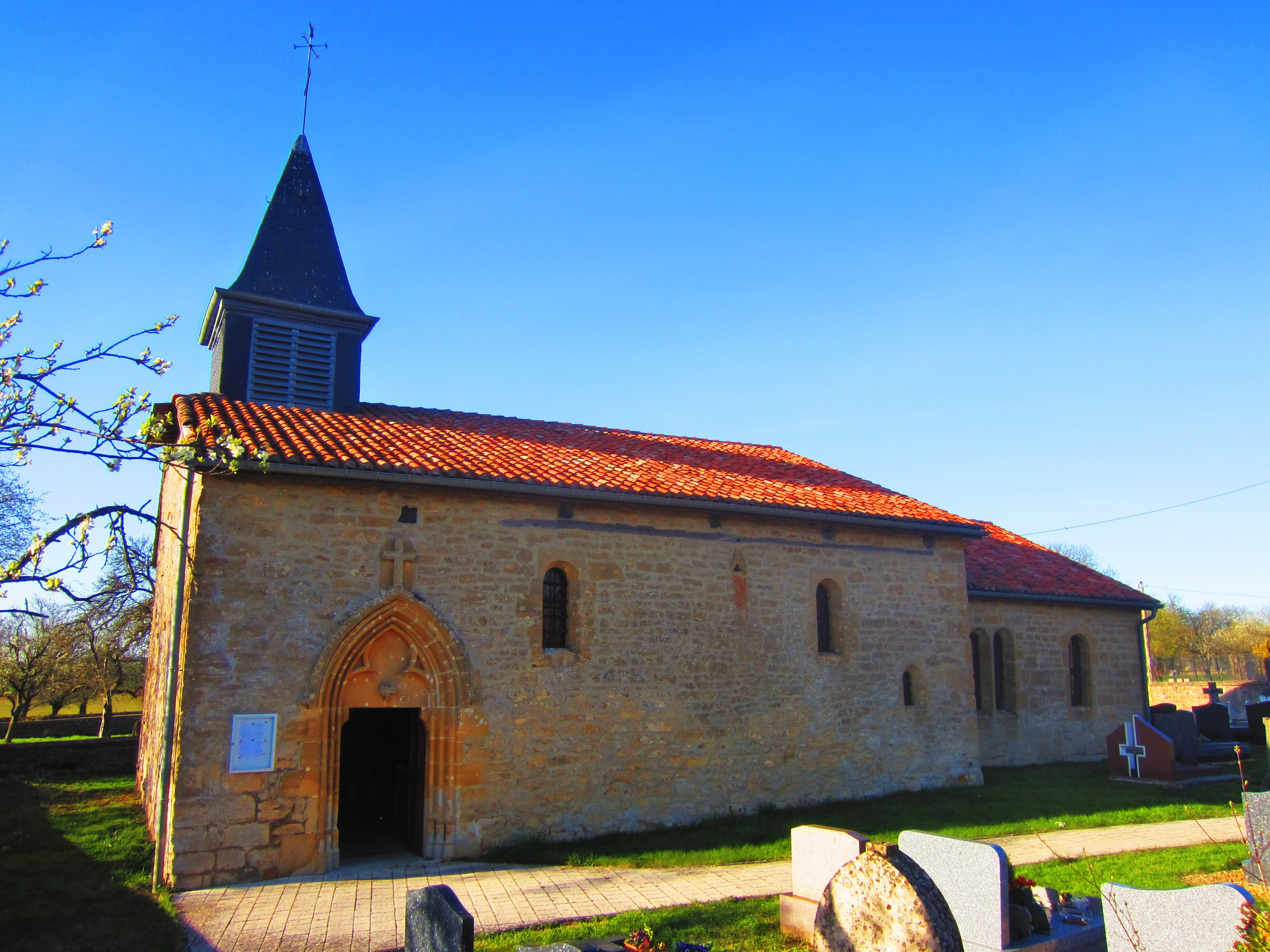
- The church in Villers-le-Rond

- Coat of arms
- Location of Villers-le-Rond
- Location within France Location within Grand Est
- Coordinates: 49°27′57″N 5°29′26″E
- Country: France
- Region: Grand Est
- Department: Meurthe-et-Moselle
- Arrondissement: Val-de-Briey
- Canton: Mont-Saint-Martin

Government
  - Mayor (2020–2026): Éric Gillardin
- Area^{1}: 4.5 km^{2} (1.7 sq mi)
- Elevation: 280 m (920 ft)
- Highest elevation: 300 m (980 ft)
- Population (2023): 109
  - Density: 24/km^{2} (63/sq mi)
- Time zone: UTC+01:00 (CET)
  - Summer (DST): UTC+02:00 (CEST)
- INSEE/Postal code: 54576 /54260
- ^{1} French Land Register data, which excludes lakes, ponds, glaciers > 1 km^{2} (0.386 sq mi or 247 acres) and river estuaries.

Villers-le-Rond (French pronunciation: [vilɛʁ lə ʁɔ̃]) is a commune in the Meurthe-et-Moselle department in north-eastern France.

== Geography ==
The river Othain forms all of the commune's western border.

== See also ==
- Communes of the Meurthe-et-Moselle department
