= Ugny =

- Commune
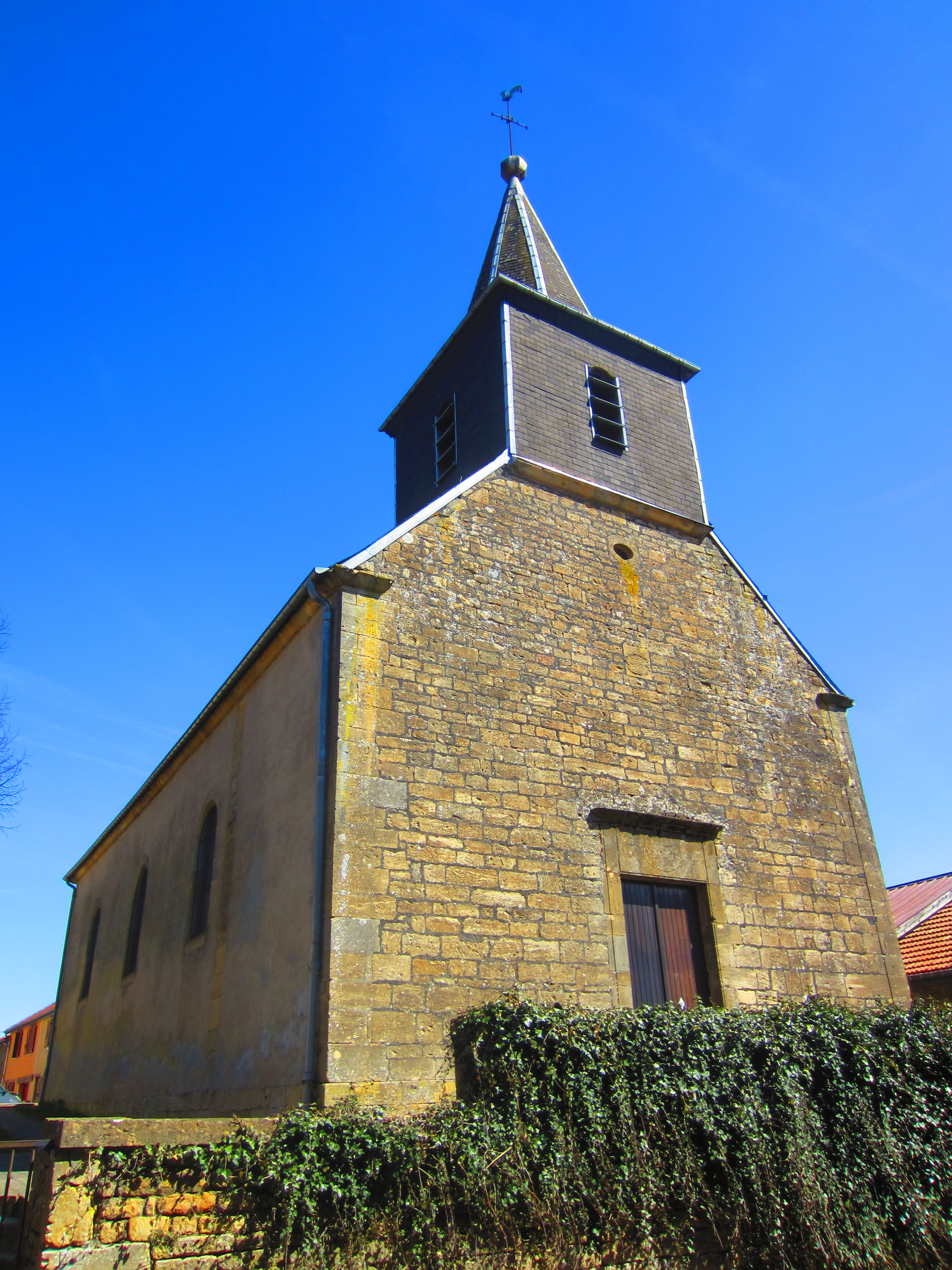
- The church in Ugny

- Coat of arms
- Location of Ugny
- Location within France Location within Grand Est
- Coordinates: 49°28′19″N 5°41′57″E
- Country: France
- Region: Grand Est
- Department: Meurthe-et-Moselle
- Arrondissement: Val-de-Briey
- Canton: Mont-Saint-Martin
- Intercommunality: Grand Longwy Agglomération

Government
  - Mayor (2020–2026): Robert Bourguignon
- Area^{1}: 9.14 km^{2} (3.53 sq mi)
- Elevation: 290 m (950 ft)
- Highest elevation: 398 m (1,306 ft)
- Lowest elevation: 227 m (745 ft)
- Population (2023): 689
  - Density: 75.4/km^{2} (195/sq mi)
- Time zone: UTC+01:00 (CET)
  - Summer (DST): UTC+02:00 (CEST)
- INSEE/Postal code: 54537 /54870
- ^{1} French Land Register data, which excludes lakes, ponds, glaciers > 1 km^{2} (0.386 sq mi or 247 acres) and river estuaries.

Ugny is a commune in the Meurthe-et-Moselle department in north-eastern France.

== See also ==
- Communes of the Meurthe-et-Moselle department
