= Doncourt-lès-Longuyon =

- Commune
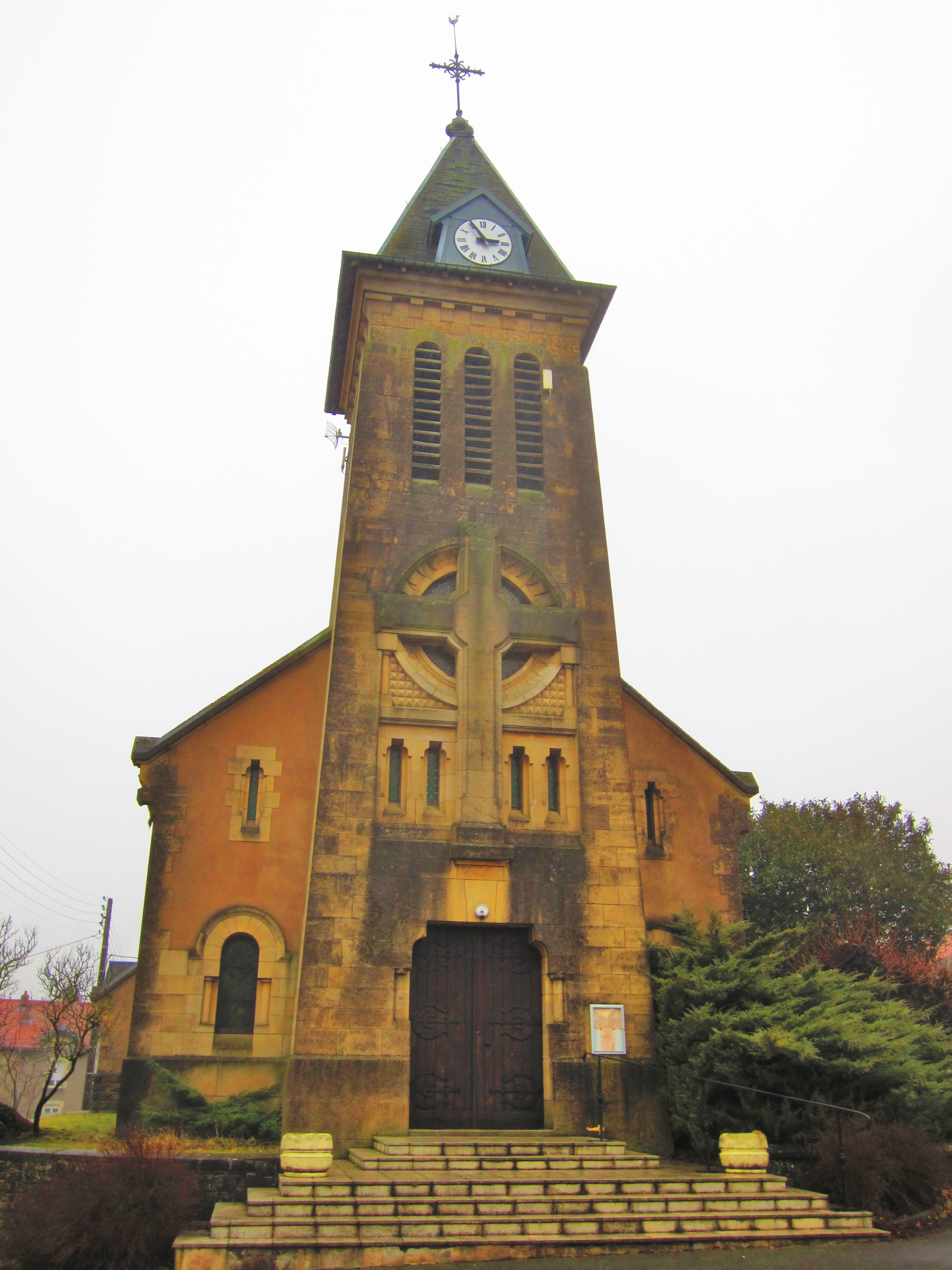
- The church in Doncourt-lès-Longuyon

- Coat of arms
- Location of Doncourt-lès-Longuyon
- Location within France Location within Grand Est
- Coordinates: 49°26′24″N 5°42′46″E
- Country: France
- Region: Grand Est
- Department: Meurthe-et-Moselle
- Arrondissement: Val-de-Briey
- Canton: Mont-Saint-Martin
- Intercommunality: CC Terre Lorraine du Longuyonnais

Government
  - Mayor (2020–2026): Didier Georges
- Area^{1}: 5.62 km^{2} (2.17 sq mi)
- Elevation: 300 m (980 ft)
- Highest elevation: 366 m (1,201 ft)
- Lowest elevation: 265 m (869 ft)
- Population (2023): 297
  - Density: 52.8/km^{2} (137/sq mi)
- Time zone: UTC+01:00 (CET)
  - Summer (DST): UTC+02:00 (CEST)
- INSEE/Postal code: 54172 /54620
- ^{1} French Land Register data, which excludes lakes, ponds, glaciers > 1 km^{2} (0.386 sq mi or 247 acres) and river estuaries.

Doncourt-lès-Longuyon (French pronunciation: [dɔ̃kuʁ lɛ lɔ̃ɡɥijɔ̃], literally Doncourt near Longuyon) is a commune in the Meurthe-et-Moselle department in north-eastern France.

== History ==
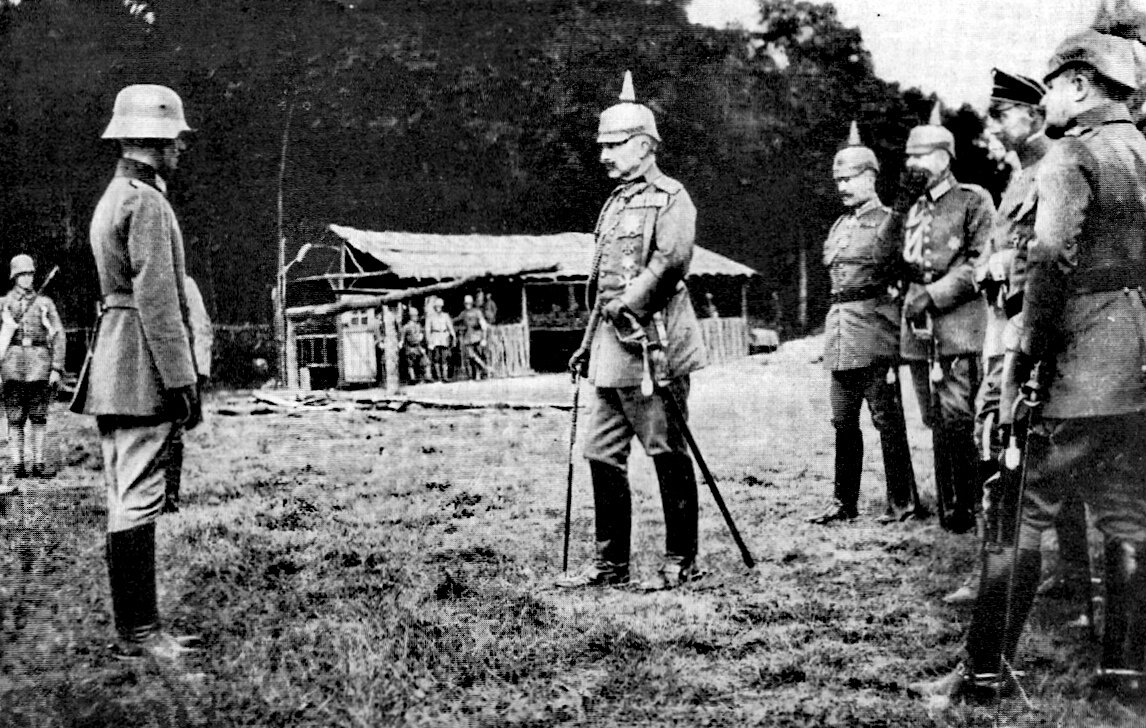
Rohr meets the Emperor

During World War I the forest of Doncourt became a training ground for the German Sturm-Bataillon Nr. 5 (Rohr) commanded by Willy Rohr. The German Emperor Wilhelm II visited Rohr and his battalion on 14 August 1916.

== See also ==
- Communes of the Meurthe-et-Moselle department
