= Canton of Conflans-en-Jarnisy =

Former canton in Meurthe-et-Moselle, France

Coordinates: 49°10′00″N 5°48′18″E

- Former canton
- Location of the canton in the arrondissement of Briey
- Country: France
- Region: Grand Est
- Department: Meurthe-et-Moselle
- No. of communes: {{{nbcomm}}}
- Disbanded: 2015

Government
  - Representatives: Olivier Tritz
- Area: 231.05 km^{2} (89.21 sq mi)
- Population (2012): 19,232
  - Density: 83.237/km^{2} (215.58/sq mi)

The canton of Conflans-en-Jarnisy (French: Canton de Conflans-en-Jarnisy) is a former French canton located in the department of Meurthe-et-Moselle in the Lorraine region (now part of Grand Est). This canton was organized around Conflans-en-Jarnisy in the arrondissement of Briey. It is now part of the canton of Pays de Briey.

The last general councillor from this canton was Olivier Tritz (PCF), elected in 2011.

== Composition ==
The canton of Conflans-en-Jarnisy grouped together 25 municipalities and had 19,232 inhabitants (2012 census without double counts).

1. Abbéville-lès-Conflans
2. Affléville
3. Allamont
4. Béchamps
5. Boncourt
6. Brainville
7. Bruville
8. Conflans-en-Jarnisy
9. Doncourt-lès-Conflans
10. Fléville-Lixières
11. Friauville
12. Giraumont, Meurthe-et-Moselle
13. Gondrecourt-Aix
14. Hannonville-Suzémont
15. Jarny
16. Jeandelize
17. Labry
18. Mouaville
19. Norroy-le-Sec
20. Olley
21. Ozerailles
22. Puxe
23. Saint-Marcel
24. Thumeréville
25. Ville-sur-Yron
