= Canton of Homécourt =

Former canton in Meurthe-et-Moselle, France

Coordinates: 49°13′29″N 5°57′15″E

- Former canton
- Location of the canton in the arrondissement of Briey
- Country: France
- Region: Grand Est
- Department: Meurthe-et-Moselle
- No. of communes: {{{nbcomm}}}
- Disbanded: 2015

Government
  - Representatives: Jean-Pierre Minella
- Area: 68.65 km^{2} (26.51 sq mi)
- Population (2012): 16,693
  - Density: 243.2/km^{2} (629.8/sq mi)

The canton of Homécourt (French: Canton d'Homécourt) is a former French canton located in the department of Meurthe-et-Moselle in the Lorraine region (now part of Grand Est). This canton was organized around Homécourt in the arrondissement of Briey. It is now part of the canton of Jarny.

The last general councillor from this canton was Jean-Pierre Minella (PCF), elected in 1985.

== Composition ==
The canton of Homécourt grouped together 9 municipalities and had 16,693 inhabitants (2012 census without double counts).

1. Auboué
2. Batilly
3. Hatrize
4. Homécourt
5. Jouaville
6. Moineville
7. Moutiers
8. Saint-Ail
9. Valleroy
