= Canton of Chambley-Bussières =

Former canton in Meurthe-et-Moselle, France

Coordinates: 49°03′06″N 5°52′21″E

- Former canton
- Location of the canton in the arrondissement of Briey
- Country: France
- Region: Grand Est
- Department: Meurthe-et-Moselle
- No. of communes: {{{nbcomm}}}
- Disbanded: 2015

Government
  - Representatives: Rachel Thomas
- Area: 115.65 km^{2} (44.65 sq mi)
- Population (2012): 4,001
  - Density: 34.60/km^{2} (89.60/sq mi)

The canton of Chambley-Bussières (French: Canton de Chambley-Bussières) is a former French canton located in the department of Meurthe-et-Moselle in the Lorraine region (now part of Grand Est). This canton was organized around Chambley-Bussières in the arrondissement of Briey. It is now part of the canton of Jarny.

The last general councillor from this canton was Rachel Thomas (DVG), elected in 2011.

== Composition ==
The canton of Chambley-Bussières grouped together 12 municipalities and had 4,001 inhabitants (2012 census without double counts).

1. Chambley-Bussières
2. Dampvitoux
3. Hagéville
4. Mars-la-Tour
5. Onville
6. Puxieux
7. Saint-Julien-lès-Gorze
8. Sponville
9. Tronville
10. Villecey-sur-Mad
11. Waville
12. Xonville
