= Évelyne Didier =

French politician

Member of the French Senate for Meurthe-et-Moselle
- In office 2001–2017

Mayor of Conflans-en-Jarnisy
- In office 2008–2014
- Preceded by: Jean-Pierre Maubert
- Succeeded by: Alain Lemey

Personal details
- Born: 14 March 1948 (age 77) France
- Party: French Communist Party
- Profession: Teacher

Évelyne Didier (born 14 March 1948) was a member of the Senate of France.

== Biography ==
Trained as a teacher, Evelyne Didier began her political career as a municipal councillor of Conflans-en-Jarnisy from 1973 to 1977, later serving as deputy mayor from 1983 to 2008 and as mayor of the town from 2008 to 2014. She was also a member of the general council, elected in the canton of Conflans-en-Jarnisy from 1998 to 2011. Didier was elected to the Senate of France representing Meurthe-et-Moselle on 23 September 2001, and was re-elected on 25 September 2011. She sat with the Communist, Republican, and Citizen Group. She served as vice president of the Committee for Spatial Planning and Sustainable Development and was a member of the Senate Delegation for Foresight. She also participated in the parliamentary study groups on fruit and vegetables and on waste management. Didier did not seek re-election in the 2017 Senate elections.

== French Senate ==
She has represented the Meurthe-et-Moselle department.

== Party membership ==
She is a member of the Communist, Republican, and Citizen Group.

== Other positions held ==
- Mayor of Conflans-en-Jarnisy since 2008.
- Counsel-general for Meurthe-et-Moselle, and for the canton of Conflans-en-Jarnisy.
