= Auboué =

- Commune
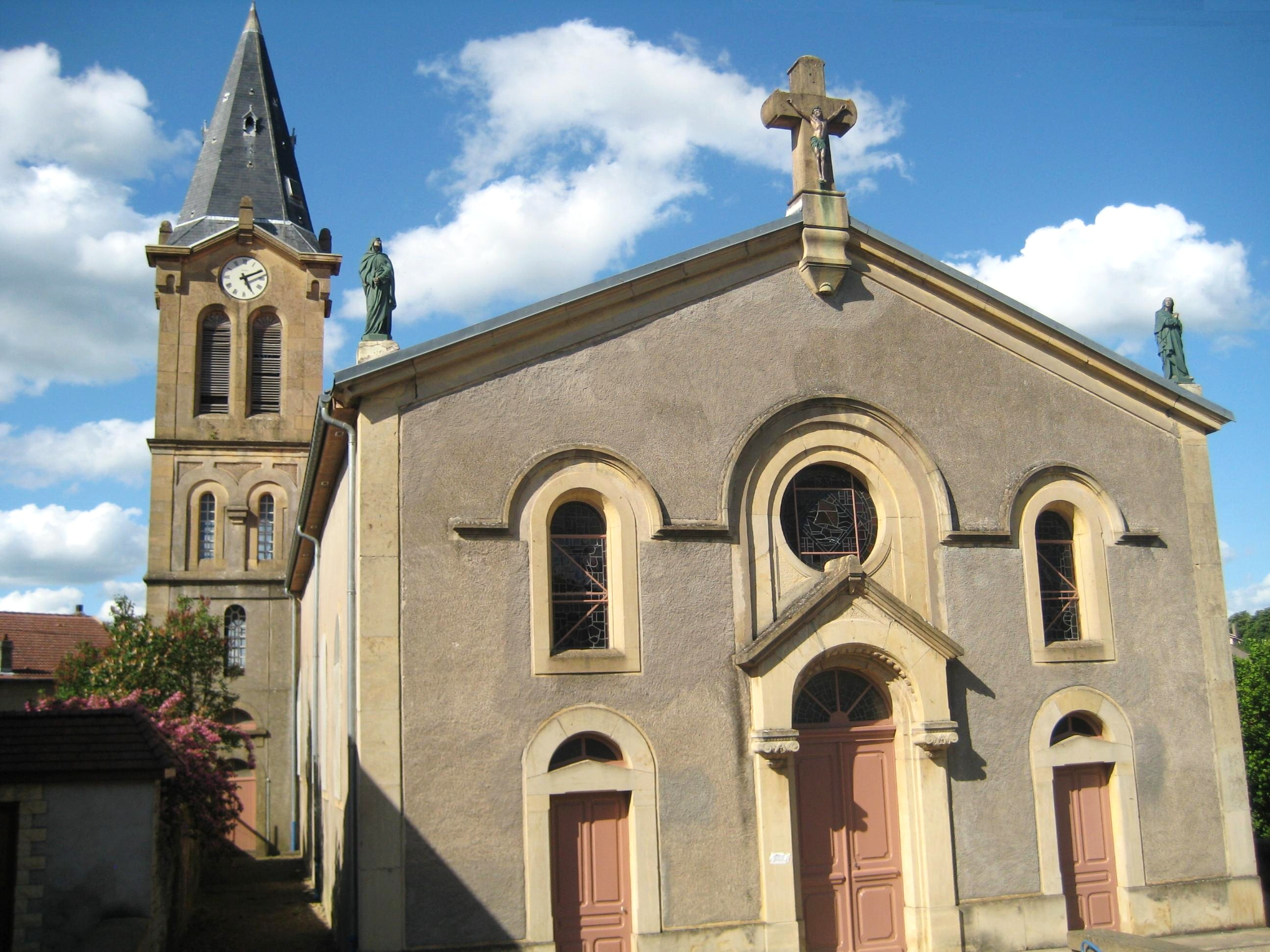
- The church in Auboué

- Coat of arms
- Location of Auboué
- Location within France Location within Grand Est
- Coordinates: 49°12′46″N 5°58′39″E
- Country: France
- Region: Grand Est
- Department: Meurthe-et-Moselle
- Arrondissement: Val-de-Briey
- Canton: Jarny
- Intercommunality: Orne Lorraine Confluences

Government
  - Mayor (2024–2026): Boualem Bouaffad
- Area^{1}: 4.54 km^{2} (1.75 sq mi)
- Elevation: 185 m (607 ft)
- Highest elevation: 266 m (873 ft)
- Lowest elevation: 177 m (581 ft)
- Population (2023): 2,650
  - Density: 584/km^{2} (1,510/sq mi)
- Time zone: UTC+01:00 (CET)
  - Summer (DST): UTC+02:00 (CEST)
- INSEE/Postal code: 54028 /54580
- ^{1} French Land Register data, which excludes lakes, ponds, glaciers > 1 km^{2} (0.386 sq mi or 247 acres) and river estuaries.

Auboué is a commune in the Meurthe-et-Moselle department in northeastern France.

== Early years ==
An 1832 plan of the village of Auboué shows 50–60 houses, sheds, barns and stables on each side of the Orne river. The church of Coinville had been built, but the church of Auboué had not yet been built, although the location had been set aside and is marked on the plan. At the end of the 19th century there were 100 voters, but ten families of farmers and craftsmen ran the village, sitting in the 10-person municipal council. Often a son or son-in-law succeeded his father or father-in-law.

== Industrialization ==
Xavier Rogé of the Société de Pont-à-Mousson began to investigate land around Auboué, and on 1 December 1882 found the upper layers of the iron oxide formation of the Briey Basin. The survey then stopped, since the company undertaking it declared that the iron oxide formation had been completely crossed. Rogé's assistant Camille Cavallier thought there could be lower layers, and obtained permission to continue the survey. In April 1883 a layer 4 metres (13 ft) thick was found, and on 11 August 1884 the Société de Pont-à-Mousson was granted the concession.

The technicians said that it would be very difficult to pass through the overburden above the Auboué ore deposit due to the amount of water it contained. Cavallier decided to proceed anyway, using the freezing method to pass through the 100 metres (330 ft) aquifer layer, although this method had not been used for more than 60 metres (200 ft) in the past. The gamble succeeded. In 1892–93, due to excavation of the first mine, the population started to rise, reaching 662 in 1901. In 1903 Cavallier installed blast furnaces at Auboué. In 1905 he purchased the Moineville concession, which was later merged with the Auboué concession. When the foundry was put into service the population rose to 2,100 in 1906 and 4,388 in 1911.

During World War I (1914–18) Auboué was occupied by the Germans. The blast furnaces were destroyed, and the mine was put out of operation. The population dropped during the war, then slowly started to recover, reaching a maximum of 5,271 in 1931. After the economic recession of 1968–70, the town lost industry and commerce and reverted to becoming a small dormitory community.

== Population changes ==
Historical population

Year	Pop.	±% p.a.
1793	330	—
1821	596	+2.13%
1841	360	−2.49%
1872	414	+0.45%
1901	662	+1.63%
1906	2,388	+29.25%
1911	4,345	+12.72%
1921	4,003	−0.82%
1926	5,022	+4.64%
1931	5,211	+0.74%
1936	4,369	−3.46%
1946	4,116	−0.59%

Year	Pop.	±% p.a.
1954	4,659	+1.56%
1962	4,984	+0.85%
1968	4,934	−0.17%
1975	4,223	−2.20%
1982	3,604	−2.24%
1990	3,192	−1.51%
1999	2,807	−1.42%
2007	2,679	−0.58%
2012	2,559	−0.91%
2017	2,514	−0.35%
2023	2,650	+0.88%

Source: EHESS and INSEE (1968-2023)

== See also ==
- Communes of the Meurthe-et-Moselle department

== Sources ==
- "Camille CAVALLIER (1854–1926)", Annales des Mines (in French)
- Viard, Paul, Auboué mon pays (in French)
- Vuillemin, Jean (October 2002), "Camille Cavallier", Arts et Métiers Magazine (in French), Fondation des Arts et Métiers, archived from the original on 29 August 2017
