= Puxieux =

- Commune
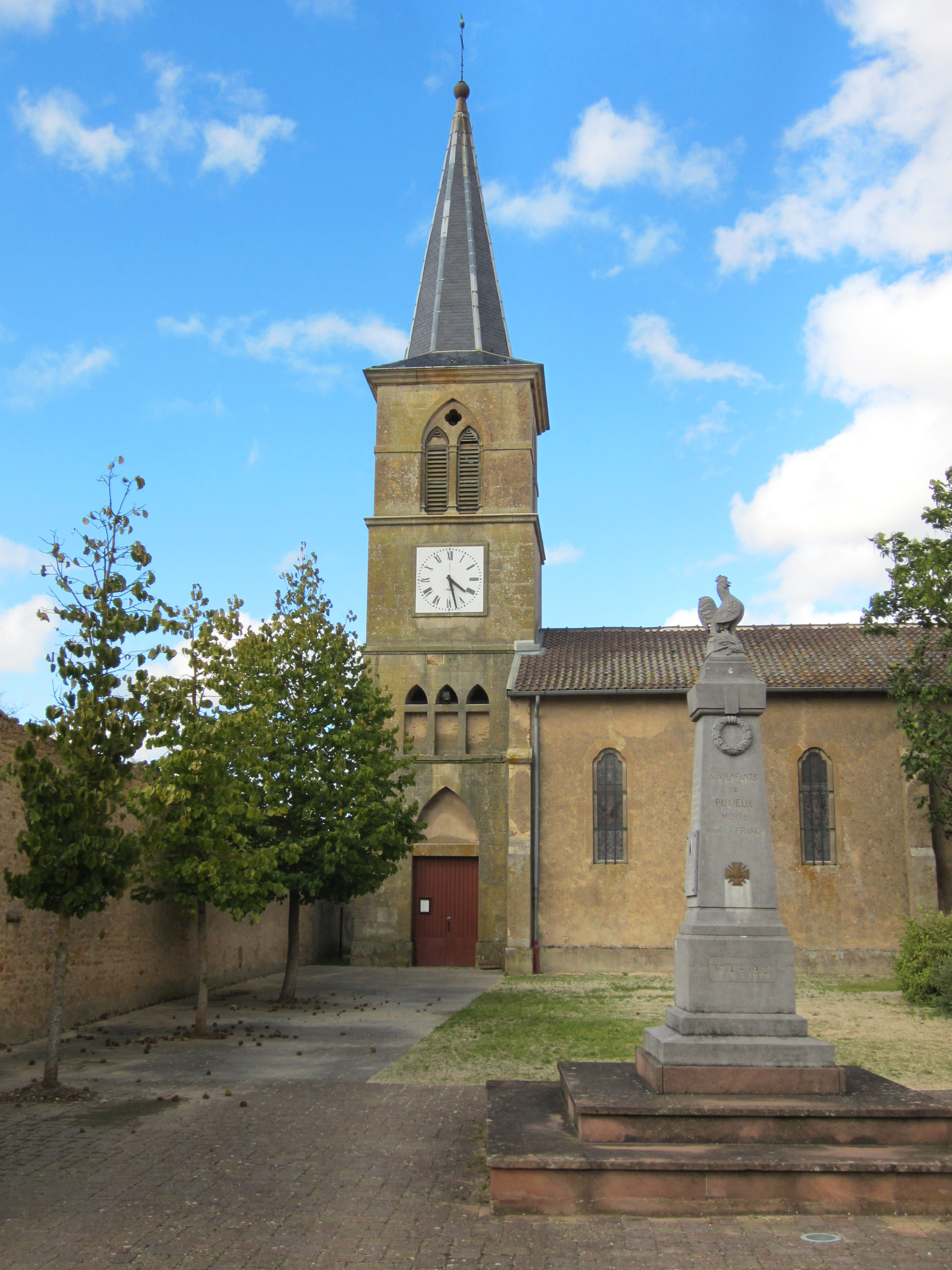
- The church in Puxieux

- Coat of arms
- Location of Puxieux
- Location within France Location within Grand Est
- Coordinates: 49°04′39″N 5°53′19″E
- Country: France
- Region: Grand Est
- Department: Meurthe-et-Moselle
- Arrondissement: Toul
- Canton: Jarny
- Intercommunality: Mad et Moselle

Government
  - Mayor (2020–2026): Francis Perin
- Area^{1}: 5.67 km^{2} (2.19 sq mi)
- Elevation: 250 m (820 ft)
- Highest elevation: 276 m (906 ft)
- Lowest elevation: 223 m (732 ft)
- Population (2023): 221
  - Density: 39.0/km^{2} (101/sq mi)
- Time zone: UTC+01:00 (CET)
  - Summer (DST): UTC+02:00 (CEST)
- INSEE/Postal code: 54441 /54800
- ^{1} French Land Register data, which excludes lakes, ponds, glaciers > 1 km^{2} (0.386 sq mi or 247 acres) and river estuaries.

Puxieux (French pronunciation: [pyksjø]) is a commune in the Meurthe-et-Moselle department in north-eastern France.

== See also ==
- Communes of the Meurthe-et-Moselle department
- Parc naturel régional de Lorraine
