= Boncourt, Meurthe-et-Moselle =

Boncourt
- Commune
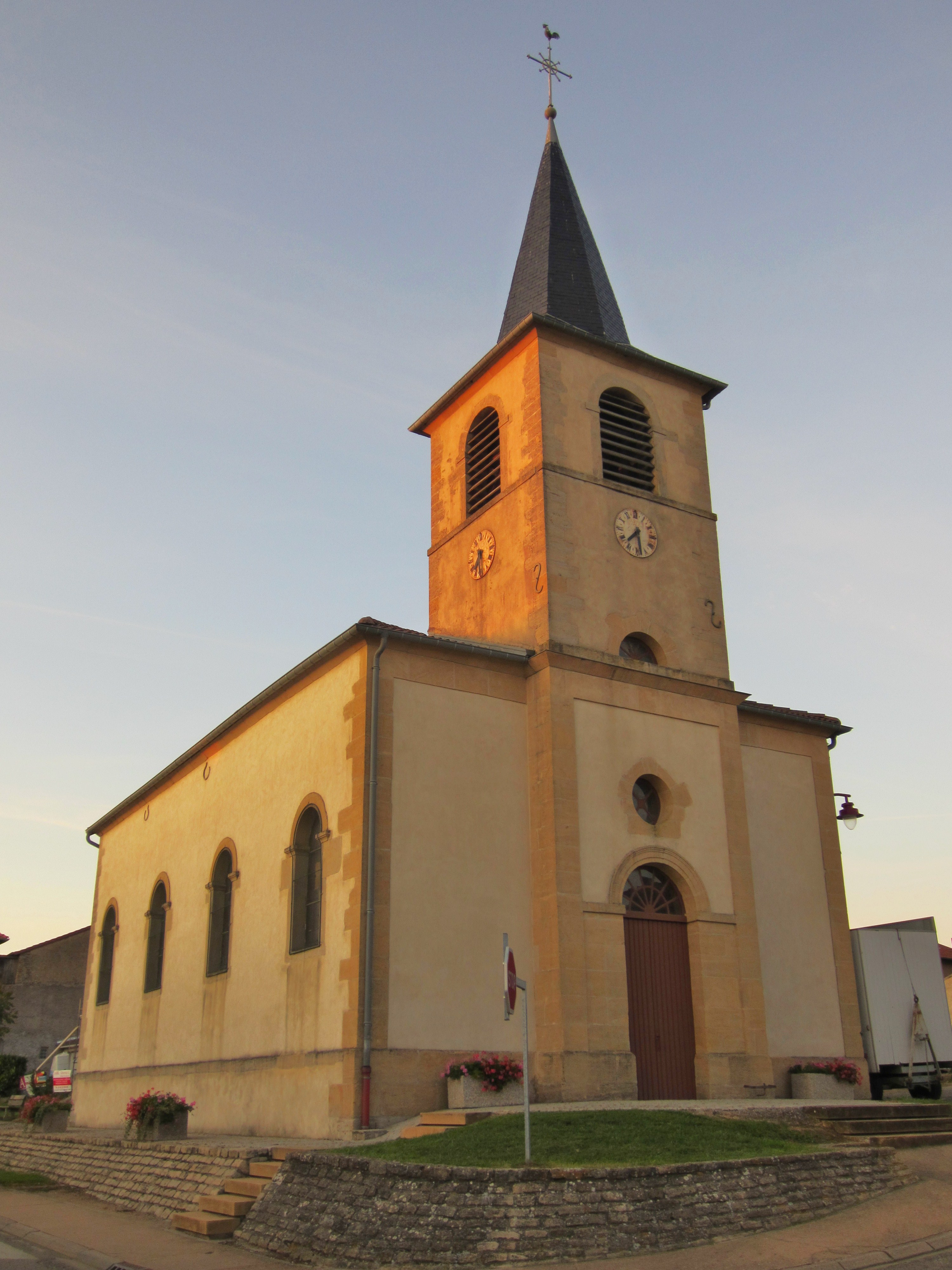
- The church in Boncourt

- Coat of arms
- Location of Boncourt
- Location within France Location within Grand Est
- Coordinates: 49°10′09″N 5°49′47″E
- Country: France
- Region: Grand Est
- Department: Meurthe-et-Moselle
- Arrondissement: Val-de-Briey
- Canton: Jarny
- Intercommunality: Orne Lorraine Confluences

Government
  - Mayor (2020–2026): Alexandre Lemoine
- Area^{1}: 6.73 km^{2} (2.60 sq mi)
- Elevation: 190 m (620 ft)
- Highest elevation: 226 m (741 ft)
- Lowest elevation: 186 m (610 ft)
- Population (2023): 179
  - Density: 26.6/km^{2} (68.9/sq mi)
- Time zone: UTC+01:00 (CET)
  - Summer (DST): UTC+02:00 (CEST)
- INSEE/Postal code: 54082 /54800
- ^{1} French Land Register data, which excludes lakes, ponds, glaciers > 1 km^{2} (0.386 sq mi or 247 acres) and river estuaries.

Boncourt (French pronunciation: [bɔ̃kuʁ]) is a commune in the Meurthe-et-Moselle department in northeastern France.

== Population ==
Historical population
Year	Pop.	±% p.a.
1968	188	—
1975	141	−4.03%
1982	136	−0.51%
1990	197	+4.74%
1999	194	−0.17%
2007	187	−0.46%
2012	191	+0.42%
2017	174	−1.85%
2023	179	+0.47%
Source: INSEE

== See also ==
- Communes of the Meurthe-et-Moselle department
