= Saint-Julien-lès-Gorze =

- Commune
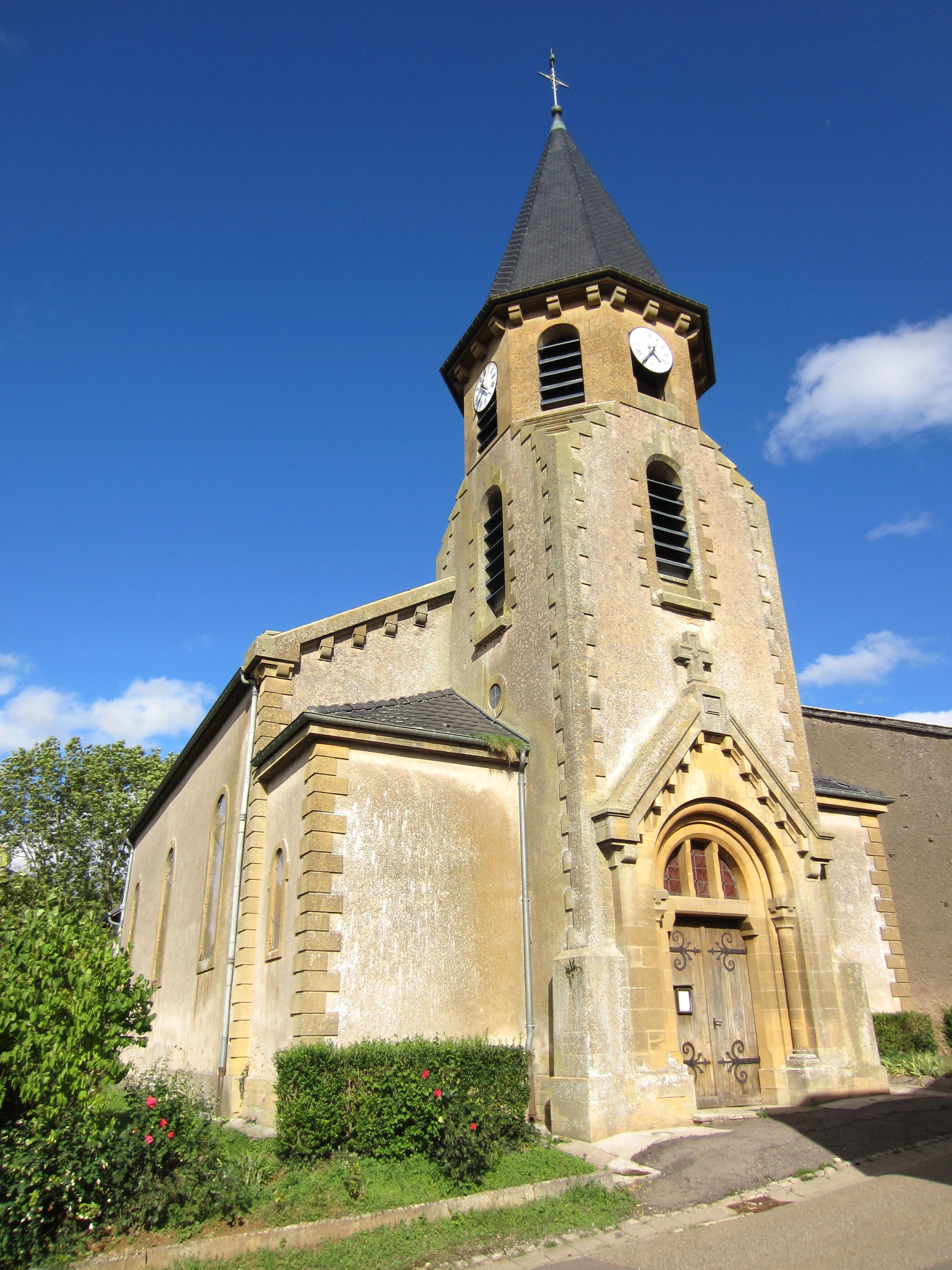
- The church in Saint-Julien-lès-Gorze

- Coat of arms
- Location of Saint-Julien-lès-Gorze
- Location within France Location within Grand Est
- Coordinates: 49°00′54″N 5°54′05″E
- Country: France
- Region: Grand Est
- Department: Meurthe-et-Moselle
- Arrondissement: Toul
- Canton: Jarny
- Intercommunality: Mad et Moselle

Government
  - Mayor (2020–2026): Guy Guillouet
- Area^{1}: 10.38 km^{2} (4.01 sq mi)
- Elevation: 250 m (820 ft)
- Highest elevation: 320 m (1,050 ft)
- Lowest elevation: 208 m (682 ft)
- Population (2023): 162
  - Density: 15.6/km^{2} (40.4/sq mi)
- Time zone: UTC+01:00 (CET)
  - Summer (DST): UTC+02:00 (CEST)
- INSEE/Postal code: 54477 /54470
- ^{1} French Land Register data, which excludes lakes, ponds, glaciers > 1 km^{2} (0.386 sq mi or 247 acres) and river estuaries.

Saint-Julien-lès-Gorze (French pronunciation: [sɛ̃ ʒyljɛ̃ lɛ ɡɔʁz], literally Saint-Julien near Gorze) is a commune in the Meurthe-et-Moselle department in north-eastern France.

== See also ==
- Communes of the Meurthe-et-Moselle department
- Parc naturel régional de Lorraine
