= Hannonville-Suzémont =

- Commune
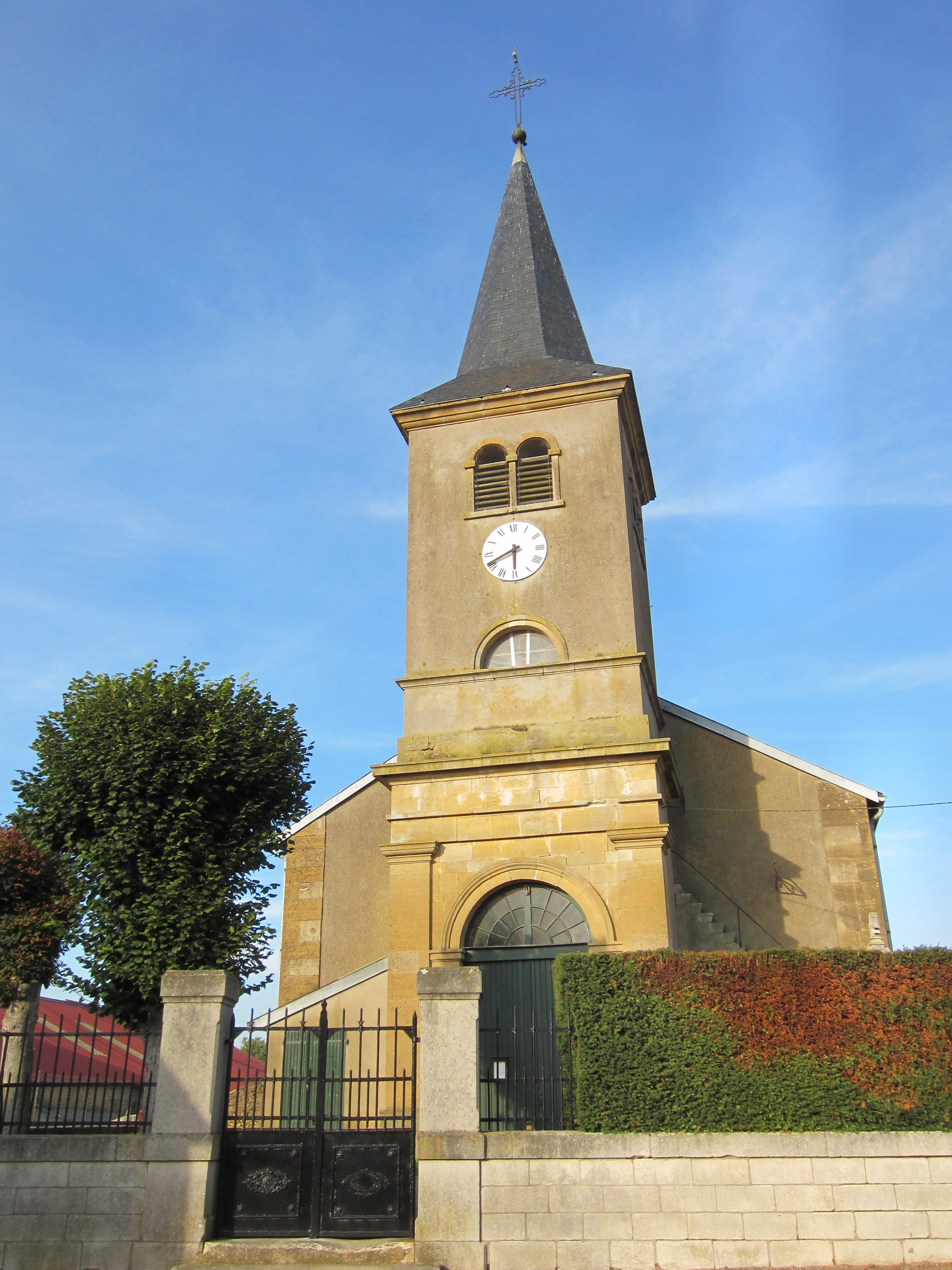
- The church in Hannonville-Suzémont

- Coat of arms
- Location of Hannonville-Suzémont
- Location within France Location within Grand Est
- Coordinates: 49°05′57″N 5°50′04″E
- Country: France
- Region: Grand Est
- Department: Meurthe-et-Moselle
- Arrondissement: Toul
- Canton: Jarny
- Intercommunality: Mad et Moselle

Government
  - Mayor (2020–2026): Didier Noël
- Area^{1}: 8.68 km^{2} (3.35 sq mi)
- Elevation: 230 m (750 ft)
- Highest elevation: 232 m (761 ft)
- Lowest elevation: 197 m (646 ft)
- Population (2023): 262
  - Density: 30.2/km^{2} (78.2/sq mi)
- Time zone: UTC+01:00 (CET)
  - Summer (DST): UTC+02:00 (CEST)
- INSEE/Postal code: 54249 /54800
- ^{1} French Land Register data, which excludes lakes, ponds, glaciers > 1 km^{2} (0.386 sq mi or 247 acres) and river estuaries.

Hannonville-Suzémont (French pronunciation: [anɔ̃vil syzemɔ̃]) is a commune in the Meurthe-et-Moselle department in north-eastern France.

== See also ==
- Communes of the Meurthe-et-Moselle department
- Parc naturel régional de Lorraine
