= Sponville =

French commune in Meurthe-et-Moselle department

- Commune
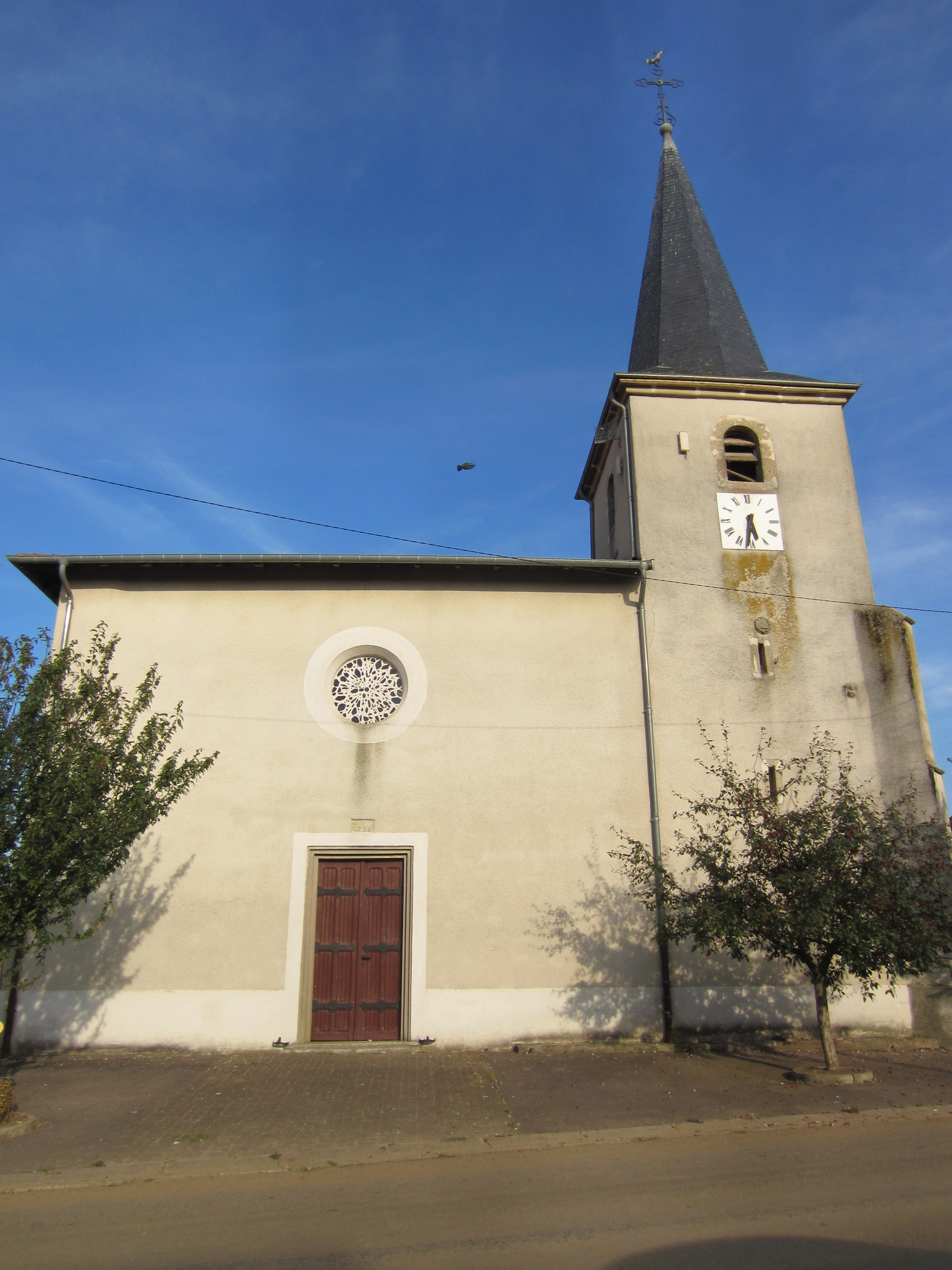
- The church in Sponville

- Coat of arms
- Location of Sponville
- Location within France Location within Grand Est
- Coordinates: 49°04′23″N 5°50′01″E
- Country: France
- Region: Grand Est
- Department: Meurthe-et-Moselle
- Arrondissement: Toul
- Canton: Jarny
- Intercommunality: Mad et Moselle

Government
  - Mayor (2020–2026): Denis Wahu
- Area^{1}: 7.2 km^{2} (2.8 sq mi)
- Elevation: 220 m (720 ft)
- Highest elevation: 235 m (771 ft)
- Lowest elevation: 199 m (653 ft)
- Population (2023): 108
  - Density: 15/km^{2} (39/sq mi)
- Time zone: UTC+01:00 (CET)
  - Summer (DST): UTC+02:00 (CEST)
- INSEE/Postal code: 54511 /54800
- ^{1} French Land Register data, which excludes lakes, ponds, glaciers > 1 km^{2} (0.386 sq mi or 247 acres) and river estuaries.

Sponville (French pronunciation: [spɔ̃vil]) is a commune in the Meurthe-et-Moselle department in north-eastern France.

== See also ==
- Communes of the Meurthe-et-Moselle department
- Parc naturel régional de Lorraine
