= Hagéville =

- Commune
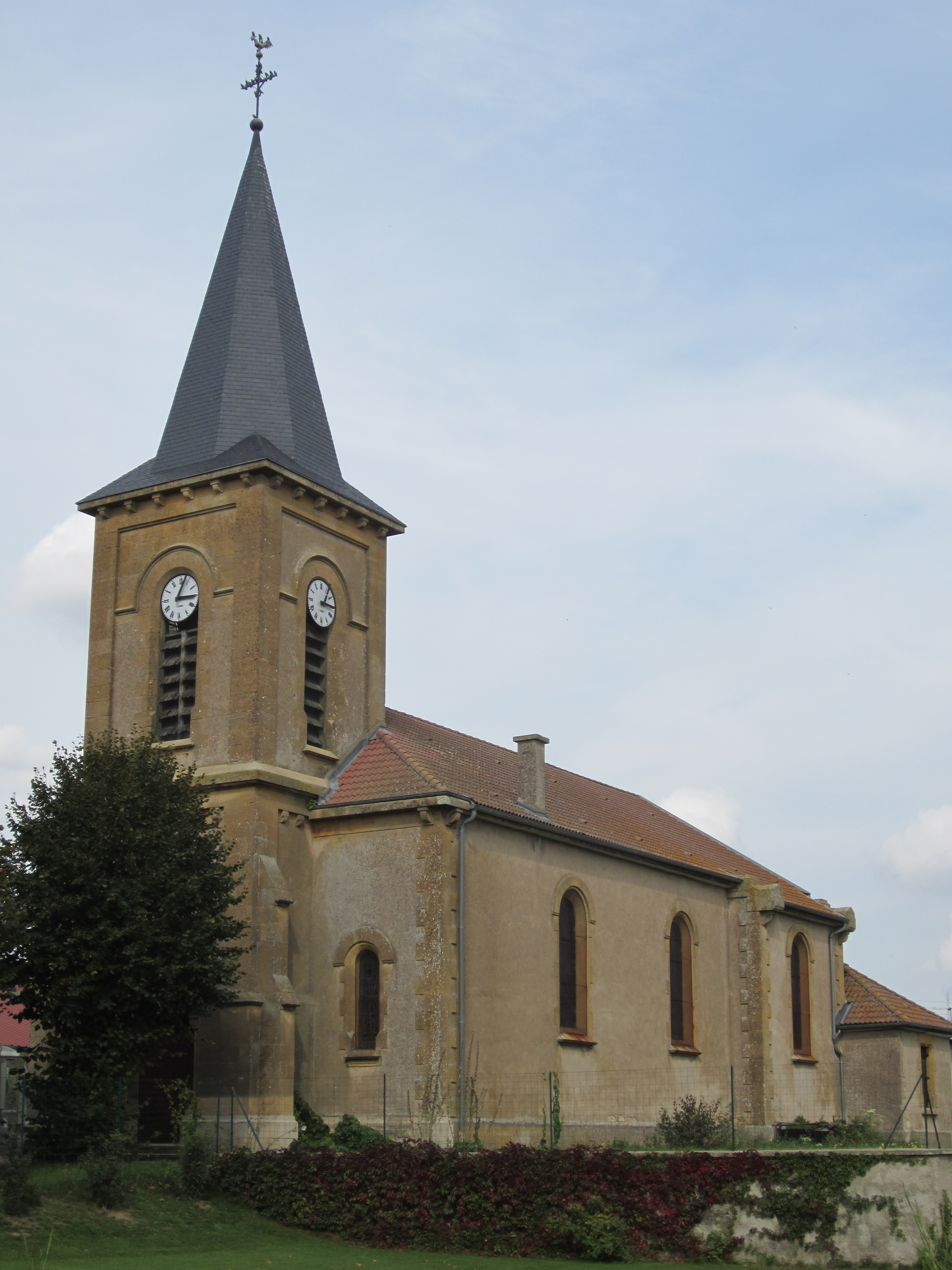
- The church in Hagéville

- Coat of arms
- Location of Hagéville
- Location within France Location within Grand Est
- Coordinates: 49°01′58″N 5°51′44″E
- Country: France
- Region: Grand Est
- Department: Meurthe-et-Moselle
- Arrondissement: Toul
- Canton: Jarny
- Intercommunality: Mad et Moselle

Government
  - Mayor (2020–2026): Claude Bosserelle
- Area^{1}: 8.94 km^{2} (3.45 sq mi)
- Elevation: 235 m (771 ft)
- Highest elevation: 272 m (892 ft)
- Lowest elevation: 210 m (690 ft)
- Population (2023): 111
  - Density: 12.4/km^{2} (32.2/sq mi)
- Time zone: UTC+01:00 (CET)
  - Summer (DST): UTC+02:00 (CEST)
- INSEE/Postal code: 54244 /54470
- ^{1} French Land Register data, which excludes lakes, ponds, glaciers > 1 km^{2} (0.386 sq mi or 247 acres) and river estuaries.

Hagéville (French pronunciation: [aʒevil]) is a commune in the Meurthe-et-Moselle department in north-eastern France.

== See also ==
- Communes of the Meurthe-et-Moselle department
- Parc naturel régional de Lorraine
