= Jouaville =

- Commune
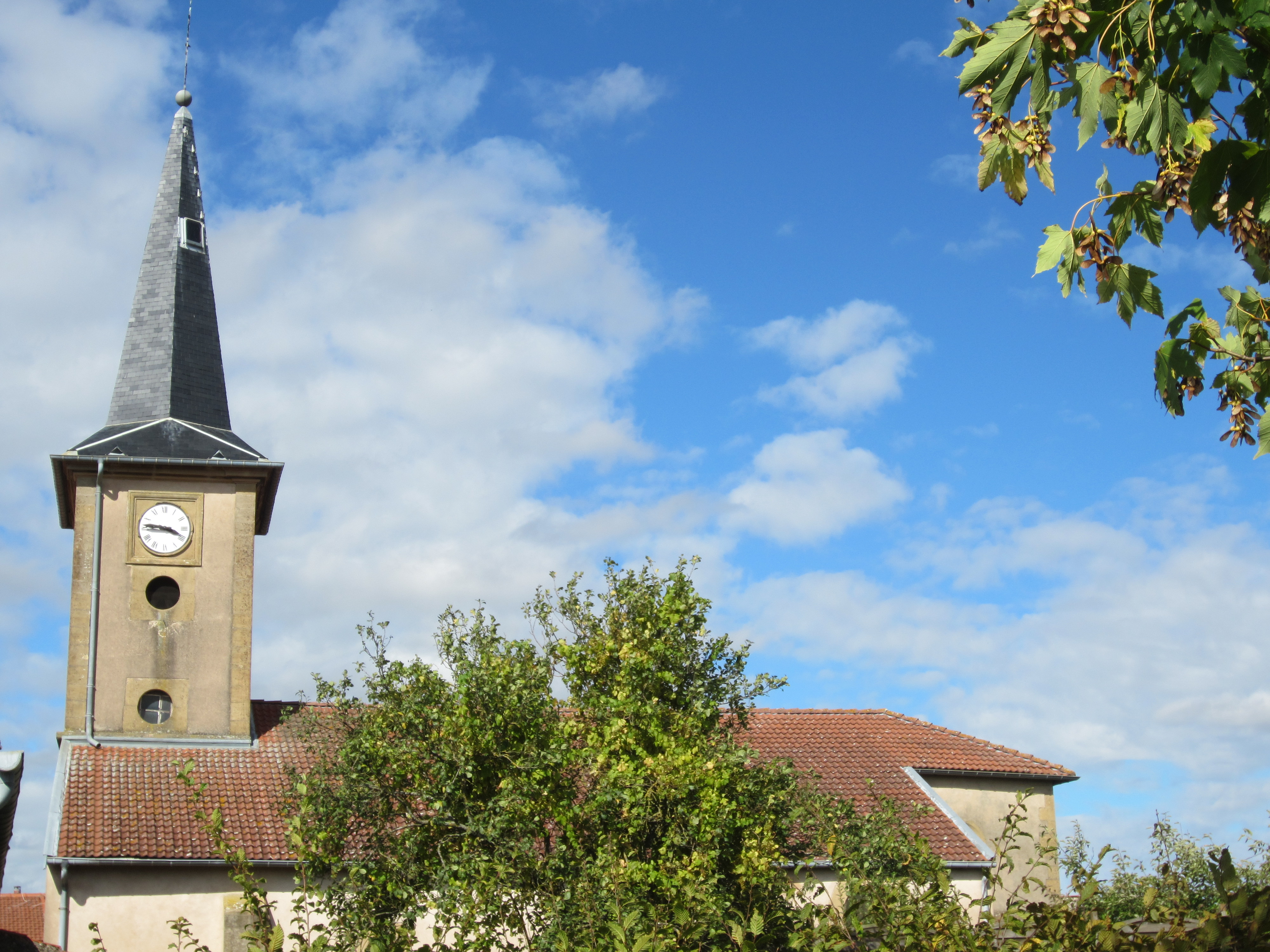
- The church in Jouaville

- Coat of arms
- Location of Jouaville
- Location within France Location within Grand Est
- Coordinates: 49°09′42″N 5°57′21″E
- Country: France
- Region: Grand Est
- Department: Meurthe-et-Moselle
- Arrondissement: Val-de-Briey
- Canton: Jarny
- Intercommunality: CC Orne Lorraine Confluences

Government
  - Mayor (2020–2026): Christian Durand
- Area^{1}: 11.32 km^{2} (4.37 sq mi)
- Elevation: 245 m (804 ft)
- Highest elevation: 322 m (1,056 ft)
- Lowest elevation: 205 m (673 ft)
- Population (2023): 274
  - Density: 24.2/km^{2} (62.7/sq mi)
- Time zone: UTC+01:00 (CET)
  - Summer (DST): UTC+02:00 (CEST)
- INSEE/Postal code: 54283 /54800
- ^{1} French Land Register data, which excludes lakes, ponds, glaciers > 1 km^{2} (0.386 sq mi or 247 acres) and river estuaries.

Jouaville (French pronunciation: [ʒwavil]) is a commune in the Meurthe-et-Moselle department in north-eastern France.

== Population ==
Historical population
Year	Pop.	±% p.a.
1968	305	—
1975	283	−1.06%
1982	249	−1.81%
1990	268	+0.92%
1999	260	−0.34%
2007	305	+2.02%
2012	319	+0.90%
2017	298	−1.35%
2023	274	−1.39%
Source: INSEE

== See also ==
- Communes of the Meurthe-et-Moselle department
