= Tronville =

- Commune
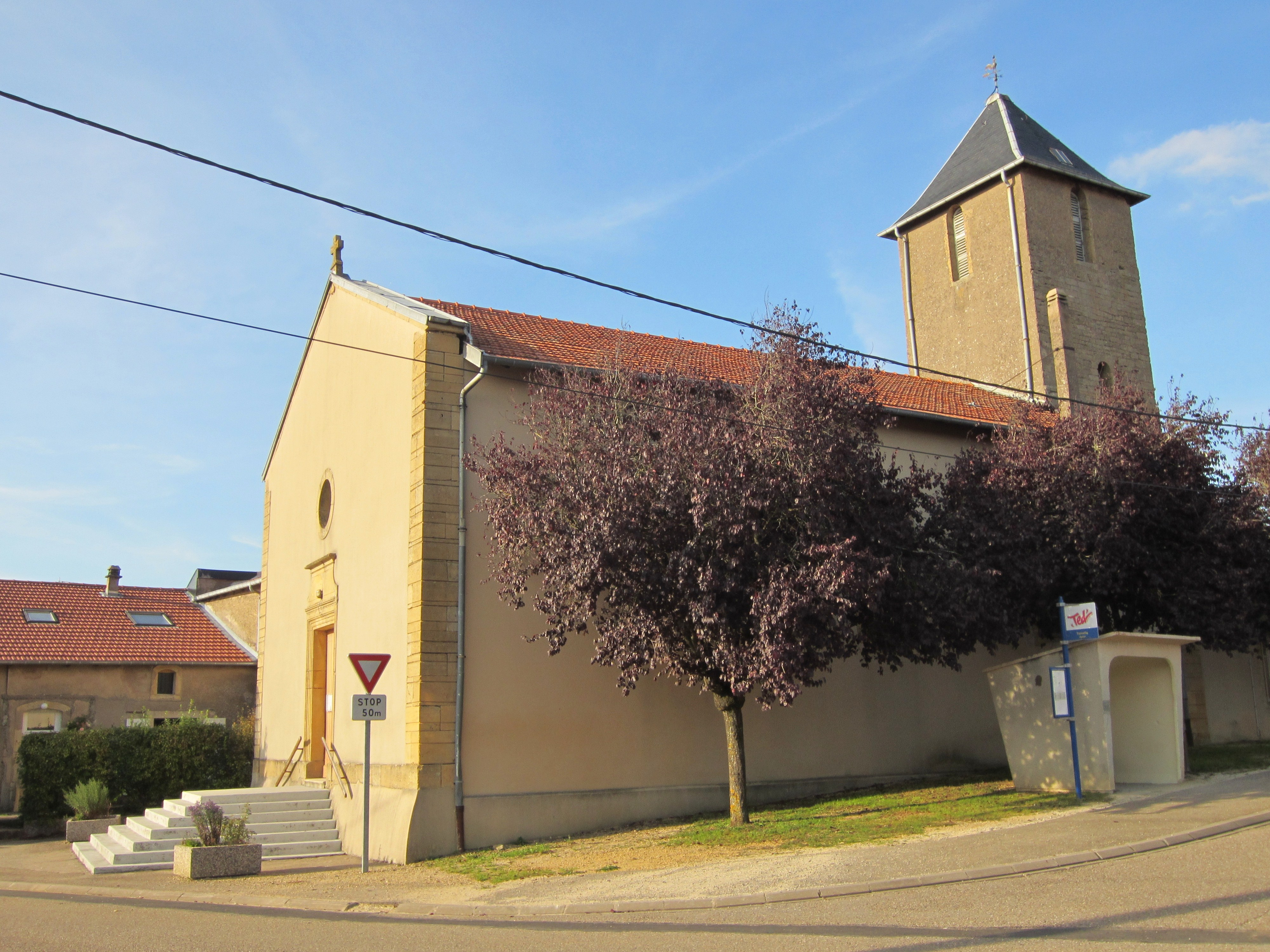
- The church in Tronville

- Coat of arms
- Location of Tronville
- Location within France Location within Grand Est
- Coordinates: 49°05′09″N 5°55′14″E
- Country: France
- Region: Grand Est
- Department: Meurthe-et-Moselle
- Arrondissement: Toul
- Canton: Jarny
- Intercommunality: Mad et Moselle

Government
  - Mayor (2020–2026): Serge Humbert
- Area^{1}: 7 km^{2} (2.7 sq mi)
- Elevation: 280 m (920 ft)
- Highest elevation: 286 m (938 ft)
- Lowest elevation: 245 m (804 ft)
- Population (2023): 200
  - Density: 29/km^{2} (74/sq mi)
- Time zone: UTC+01:00 (CET)
  - Summer (DST): UTC+02:00 (CEST)
- INSEE/Postal code: 54535 /54800
- ^{1} French Land Register data, which excludes lakes, ponds, glaciers > 1 km^{2} (0.386 sq mi or 247 acres) and river estuaries.

Tronville (French pronunciation: [tʁɔ̃vil]) is a commune in the Meurthe-et-Moselle department in north-eastern France.

== See also ==
- Communes of the Meurthe-et-Moselle department
- Parc naturel régional de Lorraine
