= Valleroy, Meurthe-et-Moselle =

Valleroy
- Commune
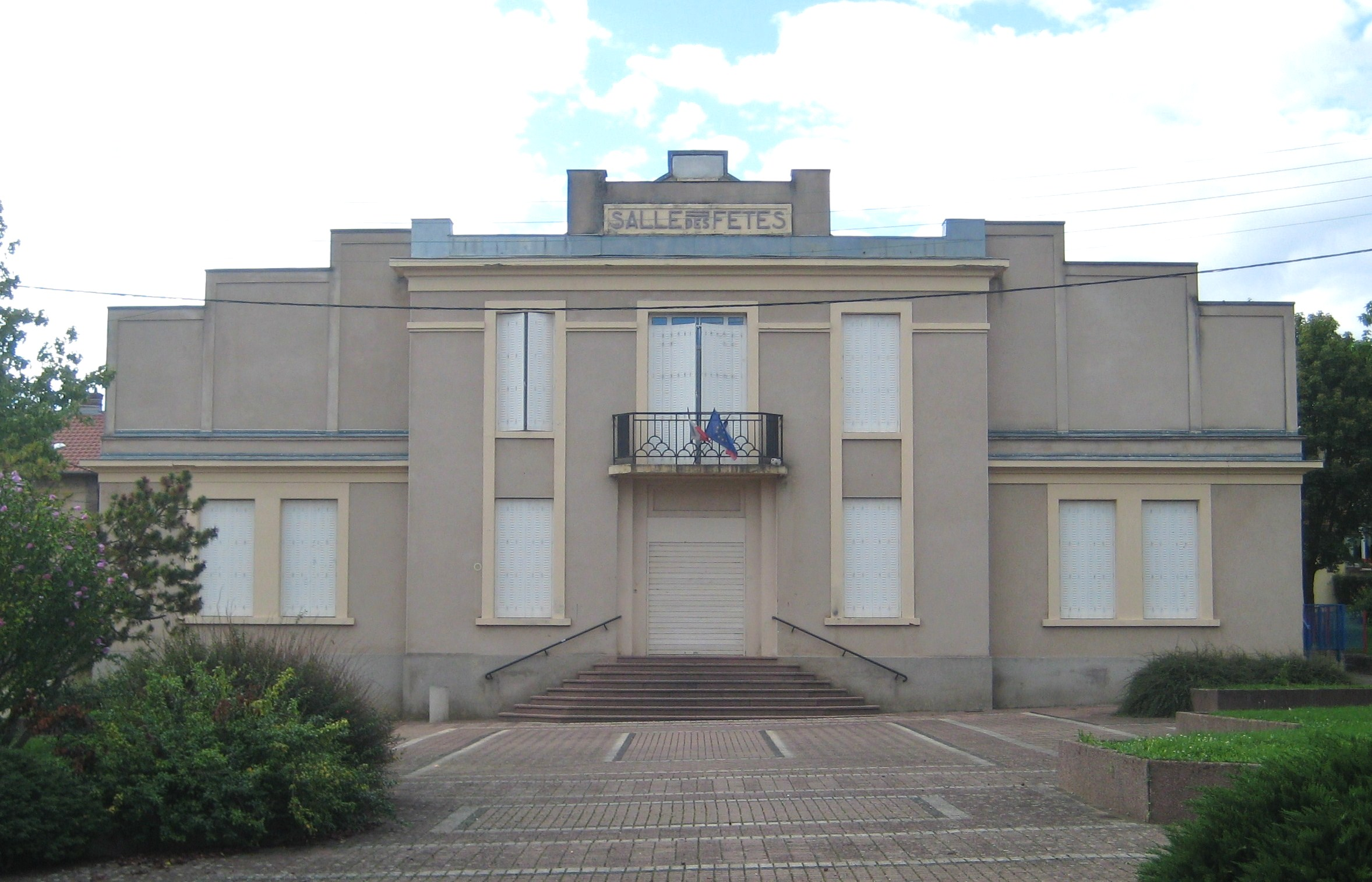
- The festival hall in Valleroy

- Coat of arms
- Location of Valleroy
- Location within France Location within Grand Est
- Coordinates: 49°12′45″N 5°56′11″E
- Country: France
- Region: Grand Est
- Department: Meurthe-et-Moselle
- Arrondissement: Val-de-Briey
- Canton: Jarny
- Intercommunality: CC Orne Lorraine Confluences

Government
  - Mayor (2020–2026): Christian Lamorlette
- Area^{1}: 12.26 km^{2} (4.73 sq mi)
- Elevation: 240 m (790 ft)
- Highest elevation: 252 m (827 ft)
- Lowest elevation: 181 m (594 ft)
- Population (2023): 2,375
  - Density: 193.7/km^{2} (501.7/sq mi)
- Time zone: UTC+01:00 (CET)
  - Summer (DST): UTC+02:00 (CEST)
- INSEE/Postal code: 54542 /54910
- ^{1} French Land Register data, which excludes lakes, ponds, glaciers > 1 km^{2} (0.386 sq mi or 247 acres) and river estuaries.

Valleroy (French pronunciation: [valʁwa]) is a commune in the Meurthe-et-Moselle department in north-eastern France.

== Population ==
Historical population
Year	Pop.	±% p.a.
1968	2,271	—
1975	2,185	−0.55%
1982	2,196	+0.07%
1990	2,337	+0.78%
1999	2,296	−0.20%
2007	2,448	+0.80%
2012	2,382	−0.55%
2017	2,334	−0.41%
2023	2,375	+0.29%
Source: INSEE

== See also ==
- Communes of the Meurthe-et-Moselle department
