= Moutiers, Meurthe-et-Moselle =

Moutiers
- Commune
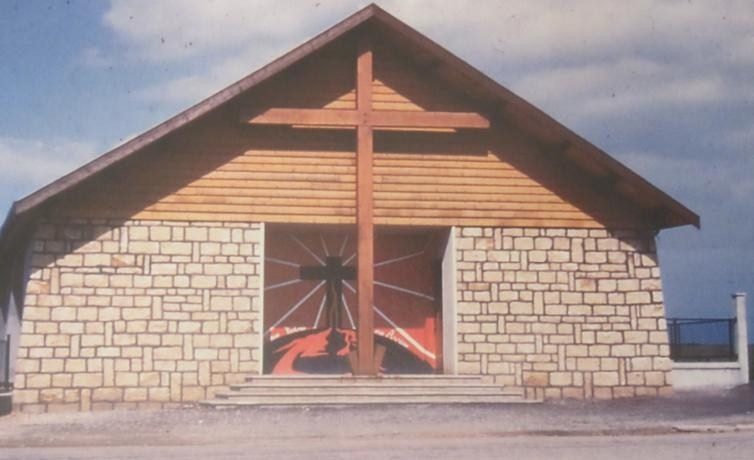
- The chapel in Moutiers

- Coat of arms
- Location of Moutiers
- Location within France Location within Grand Est
- Coordinates: 49°14′05″N 5°57′53″E
- Country: France
- Region: Grand Est
- Department: Meurthe-et-Moselle
- Arrondissement: Val-de-Briey
- Canton: Jarny
- Intercommunality: CC Orne Lorraine Confluences

Government
  - Mayor (2020–2026): Marie-Ange Challine
- Area^{1}: 6.82 km^{2} (2.63 sq mi)
- Elevation: 200 m (660 ft)
- Highest elevation: 273 m (896 ft)
- Lowest elevation: 180 m (590 ft)
- Population (2023): 1,602
  - Density: 235/km^{2} (608/sq mi)
- Time zone: UTC+01:00 (CET)
  - Summer (DST): UTC+02:00 (CEST)
- INSEE/Postal code: 54391 /54660
- ^{1} French Land Register data, which excludes lakes, ponds, glaciers > 1 km^{2} (0.386 sq mi or 247 acres) and river estuaries.

Moutiers (French pronunciation: [mutje]) is a commune in the Meurthe-et-Moselle department in north-eastern France.

== See also ==
- Communes of the Meurthe-et-Moselle department
