= Puxe =

- Commune
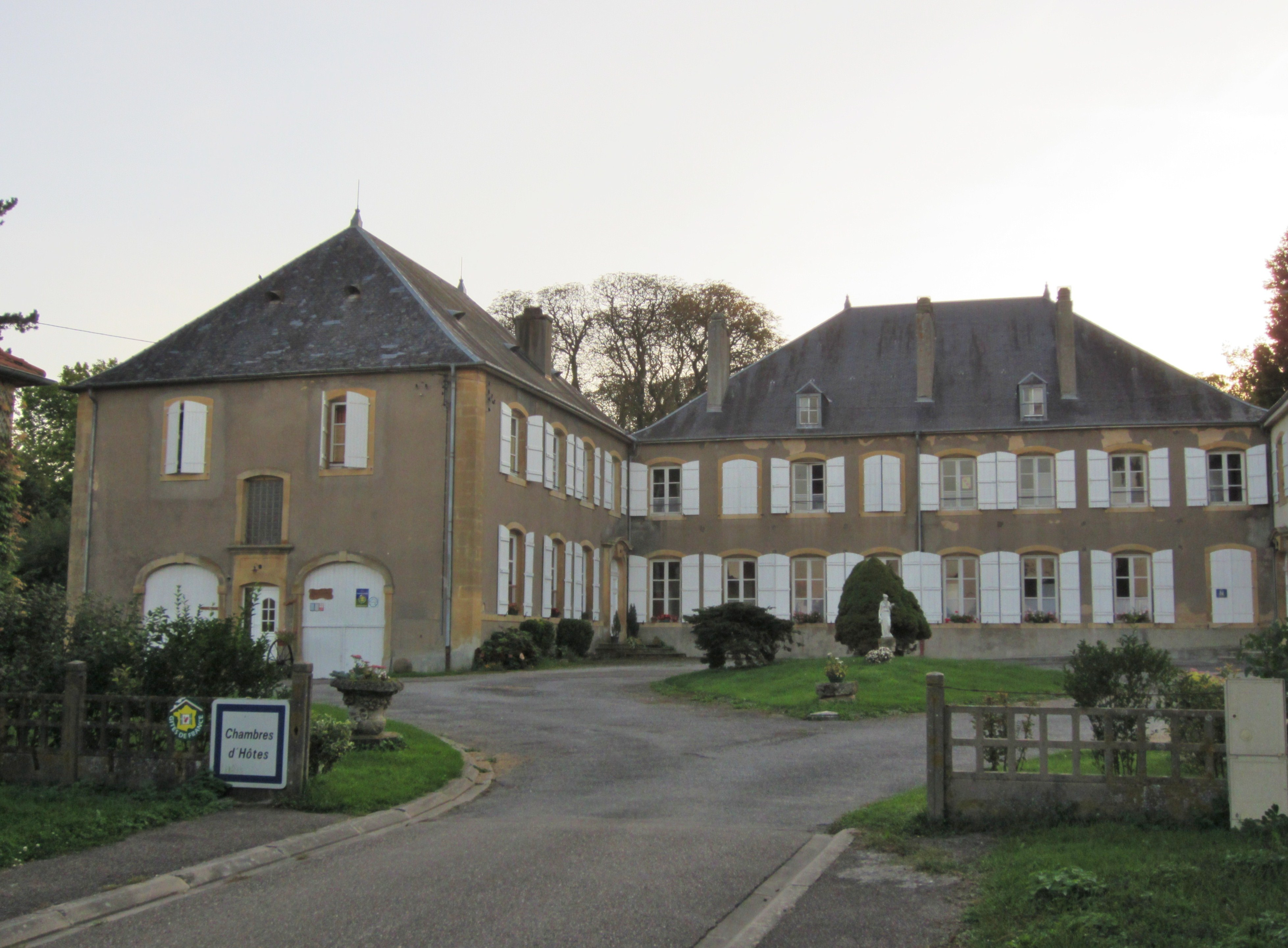
- The chateau in Puxe

- Coat of arms
- Location of Puxe
- Location within France Location within Grand Est
- Coordinates: 49°09′25″N 5°47′36″E
- Country: France
- Region: Grand Est
- Department: Meurthe-et-Moselle
- Arrondissement: Val-de-Briey
- Canton: Jarny
- Intercommunality: Orne Lorraine Confluences

Government
  - Mayor (2020–2026): Thierry Zimmermann
- Area^{1}: 5.89 km^{2} (2.27 sq mi)
- Elevation: 200 m (660 ft)
- Highest elevation: 217 m (712 ft)
- Lowest elevation: 186 m (610 ft)
- Population (2023): 107
  - Density: 18.2/km^{2} (47.1/sq mi)
- Time zone: UTC+01:00 (CET)
  - Summer (DST): UTC+02:00 (CEST)
- INSEE/Postal code: 54440 /54800
- ^{1} French Land Register data, which excludes lakes, ponds, glaciers > 1 km^{2} (0.386 sq mi or 247 acres) and river estuaries.

Puxe (French pronunciation: [pyks]) is a commune in the Meurthe-et-Moselle department in north-eastern France.

== See also ==
- Communes of the Meurthe-et-Moselle department
