= Olley, Meurthe-et-Moselle =

Olley
- Commune
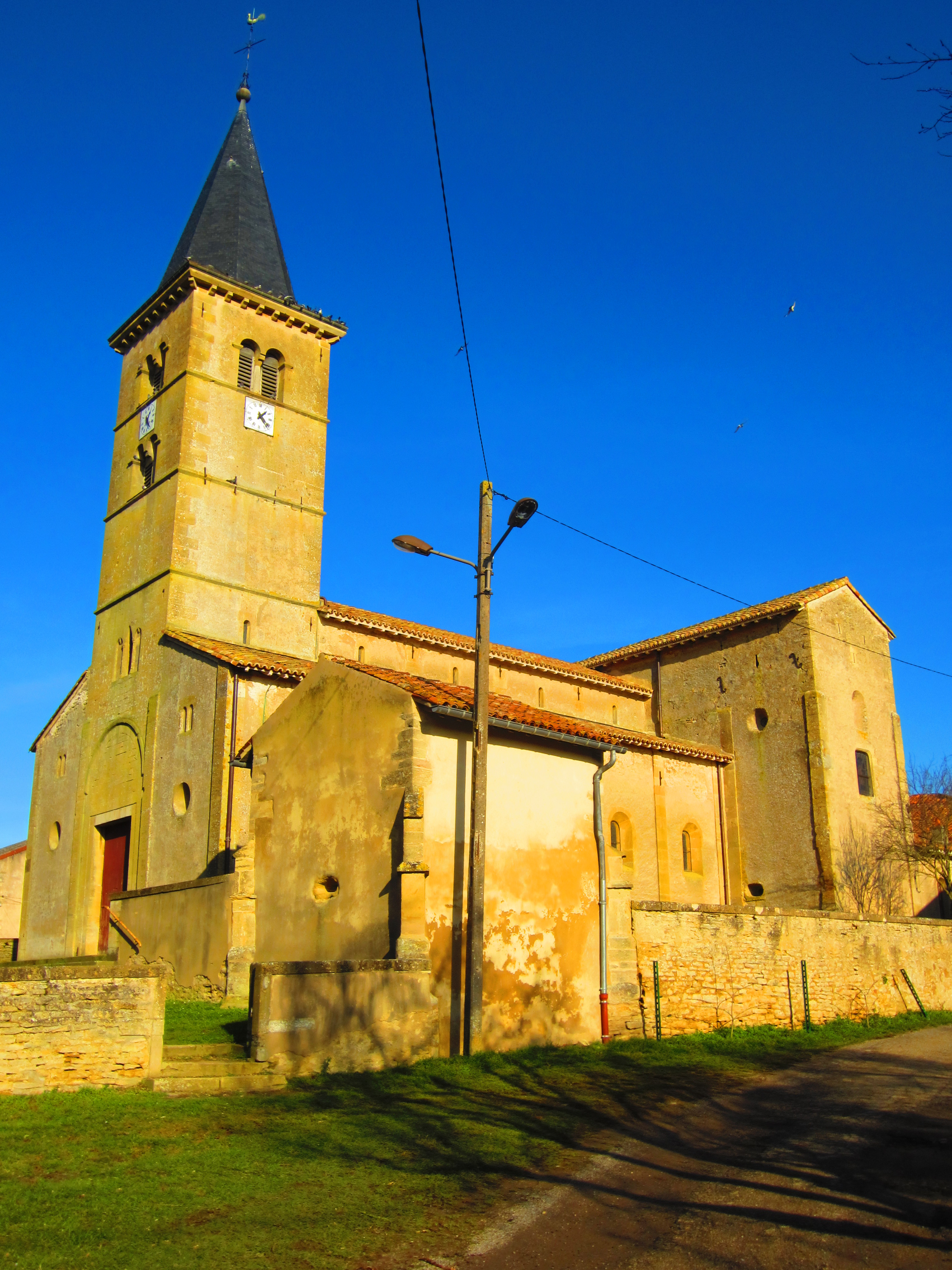
- The church in Olley

- Coat of arms
- Location of Olley
- Location within France Location within Grand Est
- Coordinates: 49°09′56″N 5°45′48″E
- Country: France
- Region: Grand Est
- Department: Meurthe-et-Moselle
- Arrondissement: Val-de-Briey
- Canton: Jarny
- Intercommunality: Orne Lorraine Confluences

Government
  - Mayor (2020–2026): David Buono
- Area^{1}: 9.48 km^{2} (3.66 sq mi)
- Elevation: 194 m (636 ft)
- Highest elevation: 223 m (732 ft)
- Lowest elevation: 189 m (620 ft)
- Population (2023): 220
  - Density: 23/km^{2} (60/sq mi)
- Time zone: UTC+01:00 (CET)
  - Summer (DST): UTC+02:00 (CEST)
- INSEE/Postal code: 54408 /54800
- ^{1} French Land Register data, which excludes lakes, ponds, glaciers > 1 km^{2} (0.386 sq mi or 247 acres) and river estuaries.

Olley (French pronunciation: [ɔlɛ]) is a commune in the Meurthe-et-Moselle department in north-eastern France.

== See also ==
- Communes of the Meurthe-et-Moselle department
