= Bruville =

- Commune
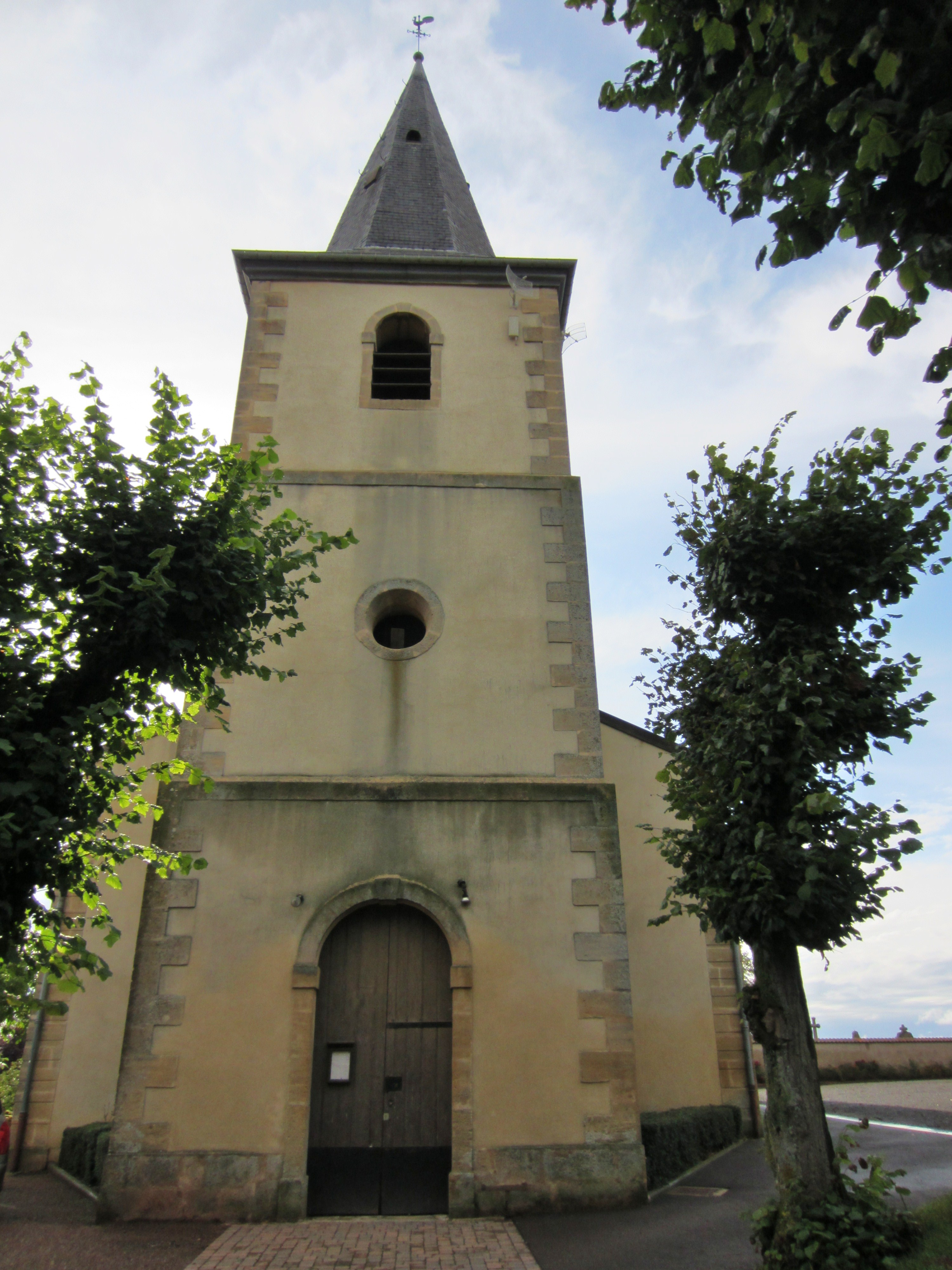
- The church in Bruville

- Coat of arms
- Location of Bruville
- Location within France Location within Grand Est
- Coordinates: 49°07′55″N 5°55′02″E
- Country: France
- Region: Grand Est
- Department: Meurthe-et-Moselle
- Arrondissement: Val-de-Briey
- Canton: Jarny
- Intercommunality: Orne Lorraine Confluences

Government
  - Mayor (2020–2026): Michel Mangin
- Area^{1}: 10.81 km^{2} (4.17 sq mi)
- Elevation: 220 m (720 ft)
- Highest elevation: 301 m (988 ft)
- Lowest elevation: 205 m (673 ft)
- Population (2023): 217
  - Density: 20.1/km^{2} (52.0/sq mi)
- Time zone: UTC+01:00 (CET)
  - Summer (DST): UTC+02:00 (CEST)
- INSEE/Postal code: 54103 /54800
- ^{1} French Land Register data, which excludes lakes, ponds, glaciers > 1 km^{2} (0.386 sq mi or 247 acres) and river estuaries.

Bruville (French pronunciation: [bʁyvil]) is a commune in the Meurthe-et-Moselle department in northeastern France.

== Population ==
Historical population
Year	Pop.	±% p.a.
1968	205	—
1975	148	−4.55%
1982	165	+1.57%
1990	166	+0.08%
1999	186	+1.27%
2007	196	+0.66%
2012	230	+3.25%
2017	226	−0.35%
2023	217	−0.68%
Source: INSEE

== See also ==
- Communes of the Meurthe-et-Moselle department
