= Saint-Marcel, Meurthe-et-Moselle =

Saint-Marcel
- Commune
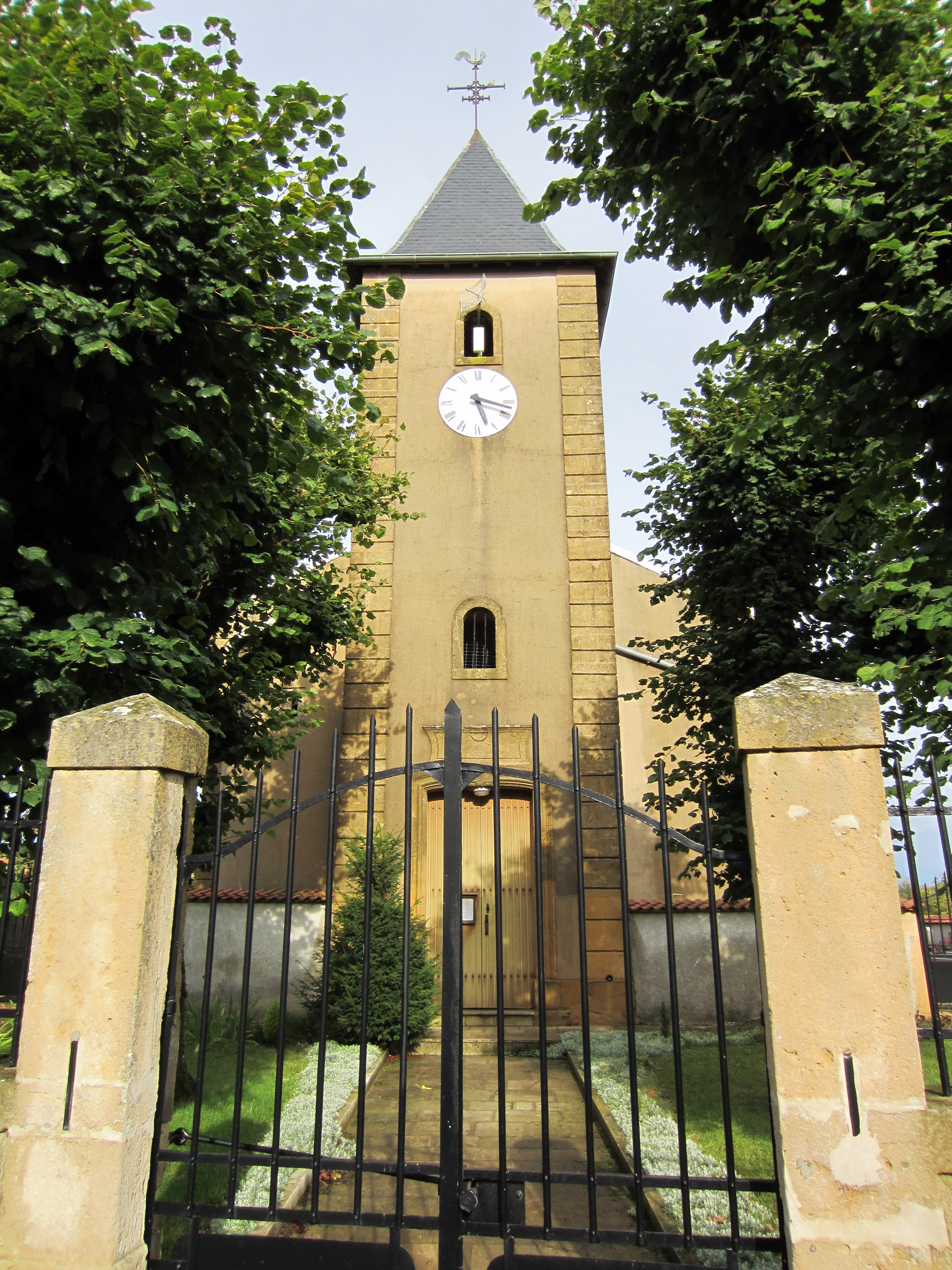
- The church in Saint-Marcel

- Coat of arms
- Location of Saint-Marcel
- Location within France Location within Grand Est
- Coordinates: 49°07′21″N 5°57′18″E
- Country: France
- Region: Grand Est
- Department: Meurthe-et-Moselle
- Arrondissement: Val-de-Briey
- Canton: Jarny
- Intercommunality: Orne Lorraine Confluences

Government
  - Mayor (2024–2026): Jean-Yves Schiltz
- Area^{1}: 11.35 km^{2} (4.38 sq mi)
- Elevation: 228 m (748 ft)
- Highest elevation: 314 m (1,030 ft)
- Lowest elevation: 250 m (820 ft)
- Population (2023): 150
  - Density: 13/km^{2} (34/sq mi)
- Time zone: UTC+01:00 (CET)
  - Summer (DST): UTC+02:00 (CEST)
- INSEE/Postal code: 54478 /54800
- ^{1} French Land Register data, which excludes lakes, ponds, glaciers > 1 km^{2} (0.386 sq mi or 247 acres) and river estuaries.

Saint-Marcel (French pronunciation: [sɛ̃ maʁsɛl]) is a commune in the Meurthe-et-Moselle department in north-eastern France.

== See also ==
- Communes of the Meurthe-et-Moselle department
