= Saint-Ail =

- Commune
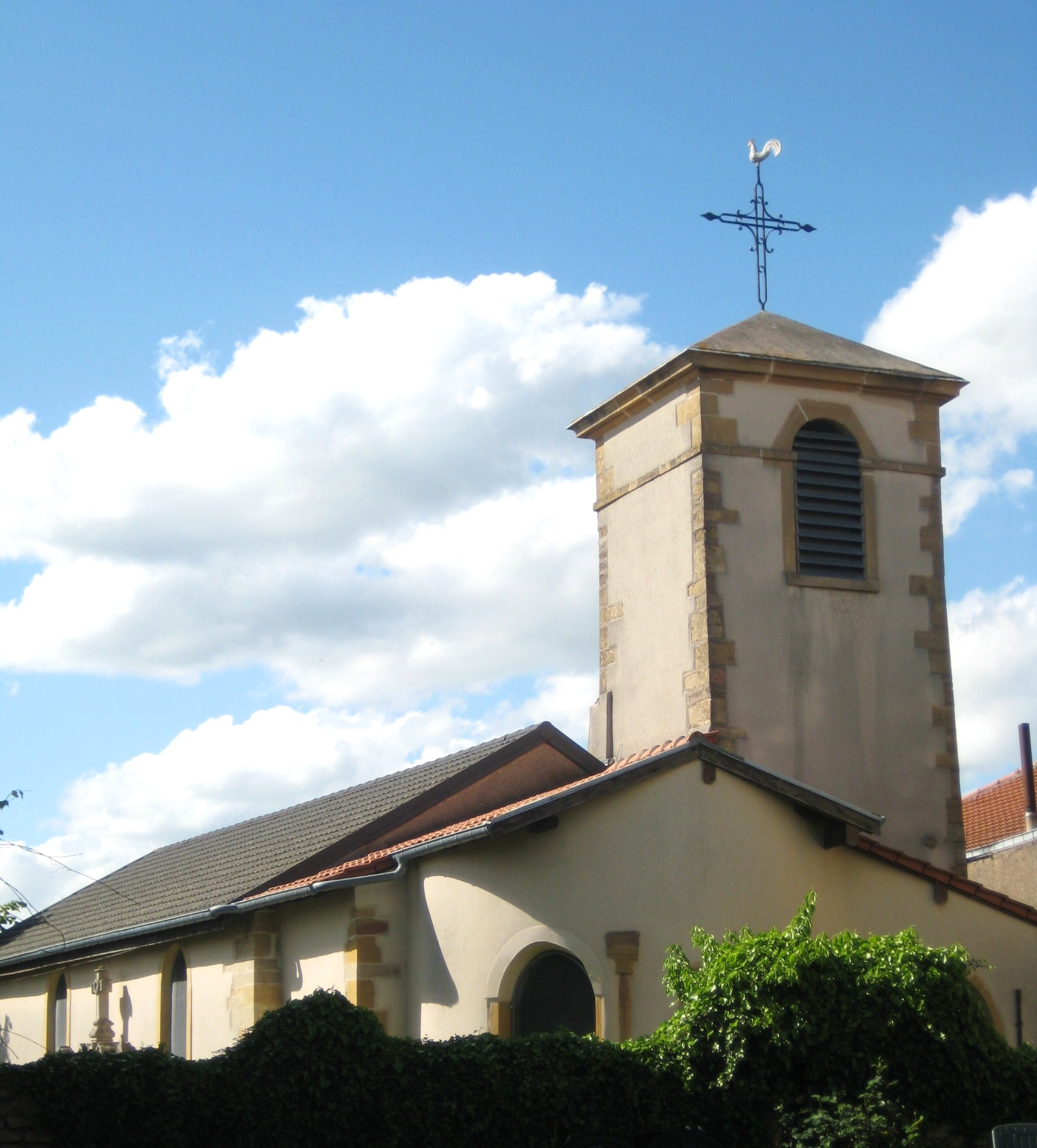
- The church in Saint-Ail

- Coat of arms
- Location of Saint-Ail
- Location within France Location within Grand Est
- Coordinates: 49°10′55″N 5°59′46″E
- Country: France
- Region: Grand Est
- Department: Meurthe-et-Moselle
- Arrondissement: Val-de-Briey
- Canton: Jarny

Government
  - Mayor (2020–2026): Daniel Nez
- Area^{1}: 7.38 km^{2} (2.85 sq mi)
- Elevation: 260 m (850 ft)
- Highest elevation: 328 m (1,076 ft)
- Lowest elevation: 229 m (751 ft)
- Population (2023): 465
  - Density: 63.0/km^{2} (163/sq mi)
- Time zone: UTC+01:00 (CET)
  - Summer (DST): UTC+02:00 (CEST)
- INSEE/Postal code: 54469 /54580
- ^{1} French Land Register data, which excludes lakes, ponds, glaciers > 1 km^{2} (0.386 sq mi or 247 acres) and river estuaries.

Saint-Ail is a commune in the Meurthe-et-Moselle department in north-eastern France.

== See also ==
- Communes of the Meurthe-et-Moselle department
