= Labry =

- Commune
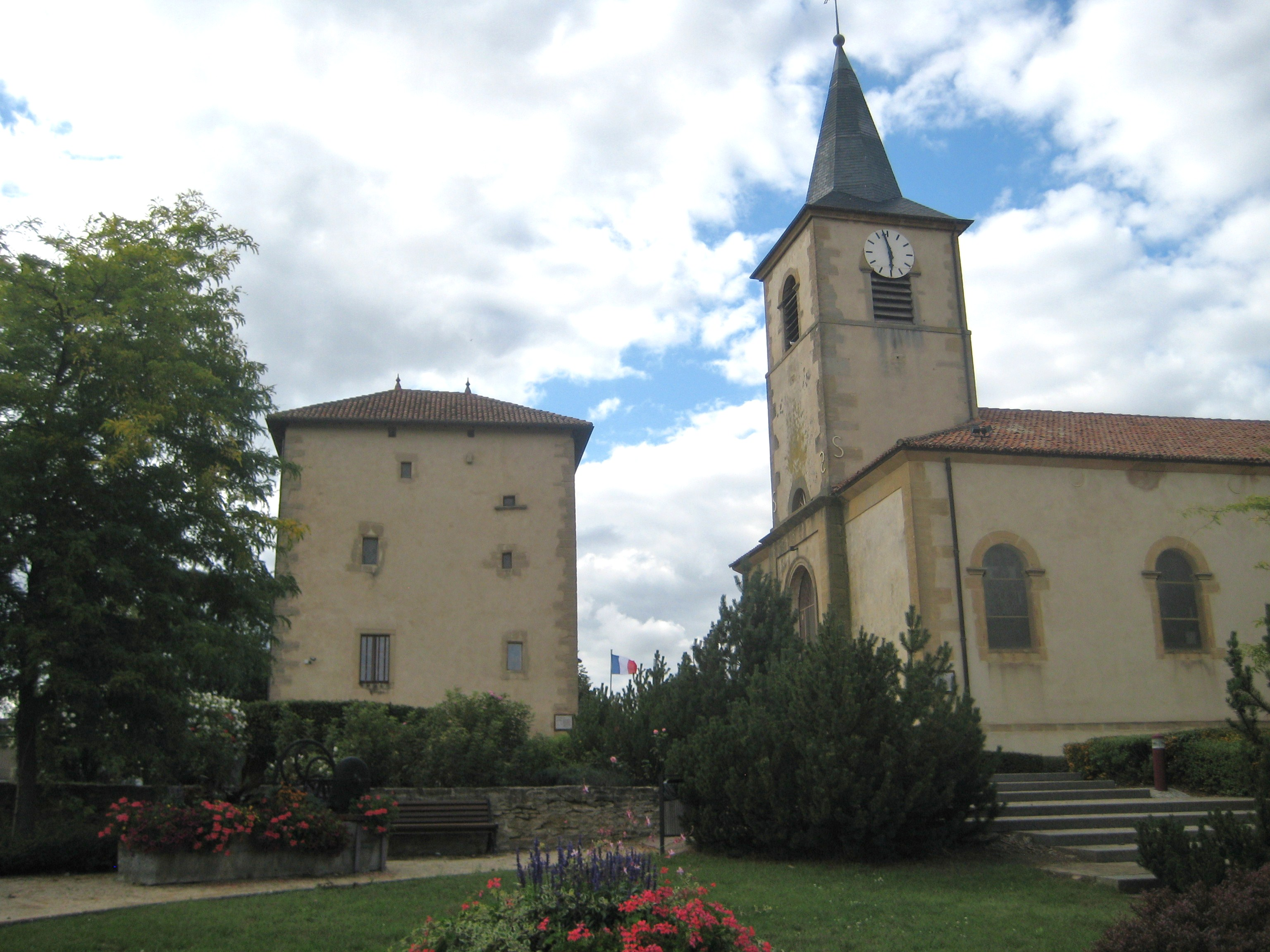
- The tower and church in Labry

- Coat of arms
- Location of Labry
- Location within France Location within Grand Est
- Coordinates: 49°10′24″N 5°52′55″E
- Country: France
- Region: Grand Est
- Department: Meurthe-et-Moselle
- Arrondissement: Val-de-Briey
- Canton: Jarny
- Intercommunality: Orne Lorraine Confluences

Government
  - Mayor (2020–2026): Luc Ritz
- Area^{1}: 5.95 km^{2} (2.30 sq mi)
- Elevation: 204 m (669 ft)
- Highest elevation: 228 m (748 ft)
- Lowest elevation: 186 m (610 ft)
- Population (2023): 1,554
  - Density: 261/km^{2} (676/sq mi)
- Time zone: UTC+01:00 (CET)
  - Summer (DST): UTC+02:00 (CEST)
- INSEE/Postal code: 54286 /54800
- ^{1} French Land Register data, which excludes lakes, ponds, glaciers > 1 km^{2} (0.386 sq mi or 247 acres) and river estuaries.

Labry (French pronunciation: [labʁi]) is a commune in the Meurthe-et-Moselle department in north-eastern France.

== See also ==
- Communes of the Meurthe-et-Moselle department
