= Xonville =

- Commune
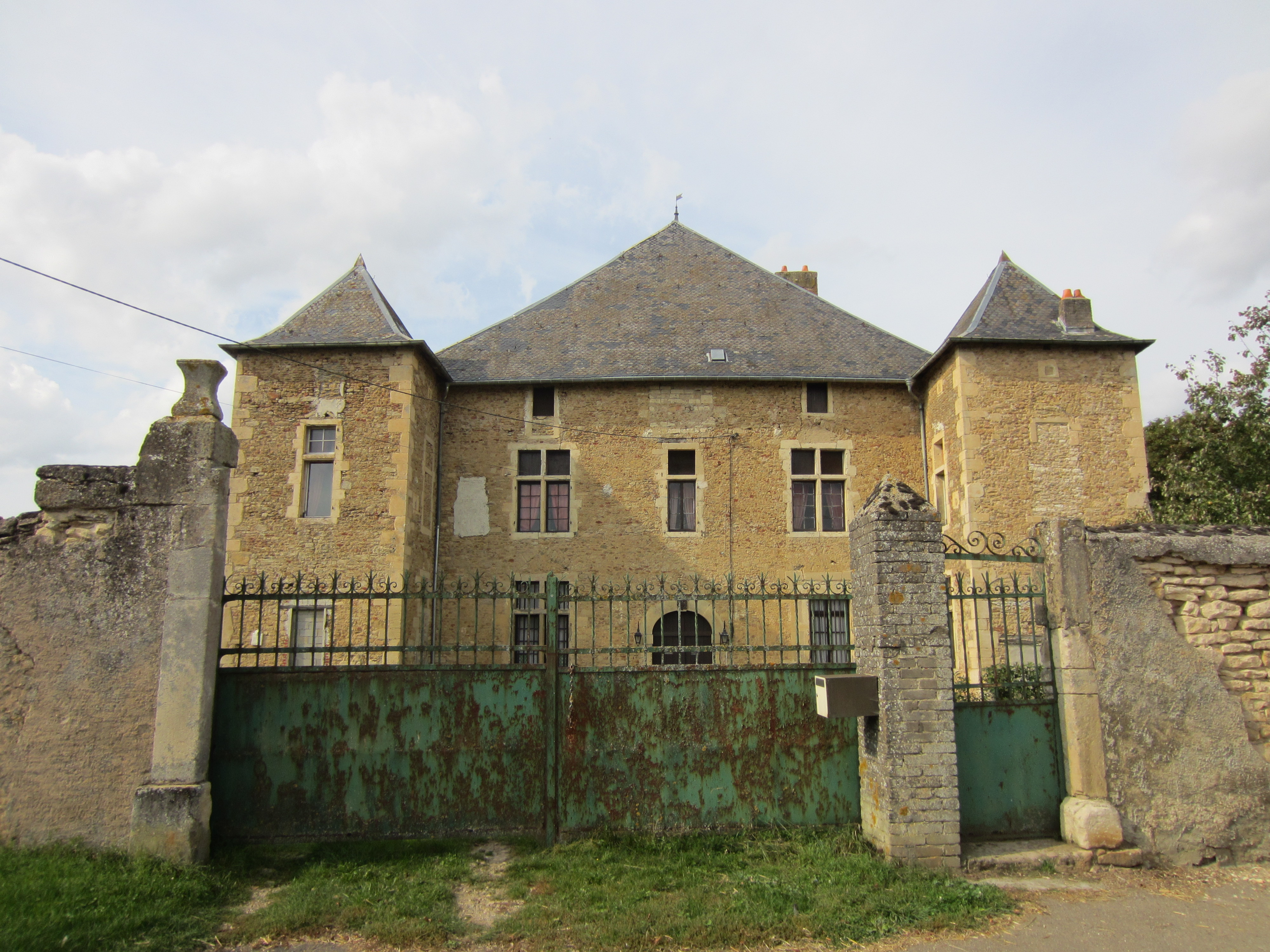
- Chateau Xonville

- Coat of arms
- Location of Xonville
- Location within France Location within Grand Est
- Coordinates: 49°03′21″N 5°50′58″E
- Country: France
- Region: Grand Est
- Department: Meurthe-et-Moselle
- Arrondissement: Toul
- Canton: Jarny
- Intercommunality: Mad et Moselle

Government
  - Mayor (2020–2026): Céline Rein
- Area^{1}: 7.27 km^{2} (2.81 sq mi)
- Elevation: 220 m (720 ft)
- Highest elevation: 251 m (823 ft)
- Lowest elevation: 213 m (699 ft)
- Population (2023): 108
  - Density: 14.9/km^{2} (38.5/sq mi)
- Time zone: UTC+01:00 (CET)
  - Summer (DST): UTC+02:00 (CEST)
- INSEE/Postal code: 54599 /54800
- ^{1} French Land Register data, which excludes lakes, ponds, glaciers > 1 km^{2} (0.386 sq mi or 247 acres) and river estuaries.

Xonville (French pronunciation: [ɡzɔ̃vil]) is a commune that is located in the Meurthe-et-Moselle department of north-eastern France.

== Population ==
Historical population
Year	Pop.	±% p.a.
1968	111	—
1975	92	−2.65%
1982	91	−0.16%
1990	105	+1.80%
1999	99	−0.65%
2007	109	+1.21%
2012	134	+4.22%
2017	127	−1.07%
2023	108	−2.66%
Source: INSEE

== See also ==
- Communes of the Meurthe-et-Moselle department
- Parc naturel régional de Lorraine
