= Dampvitoux =

- Commune
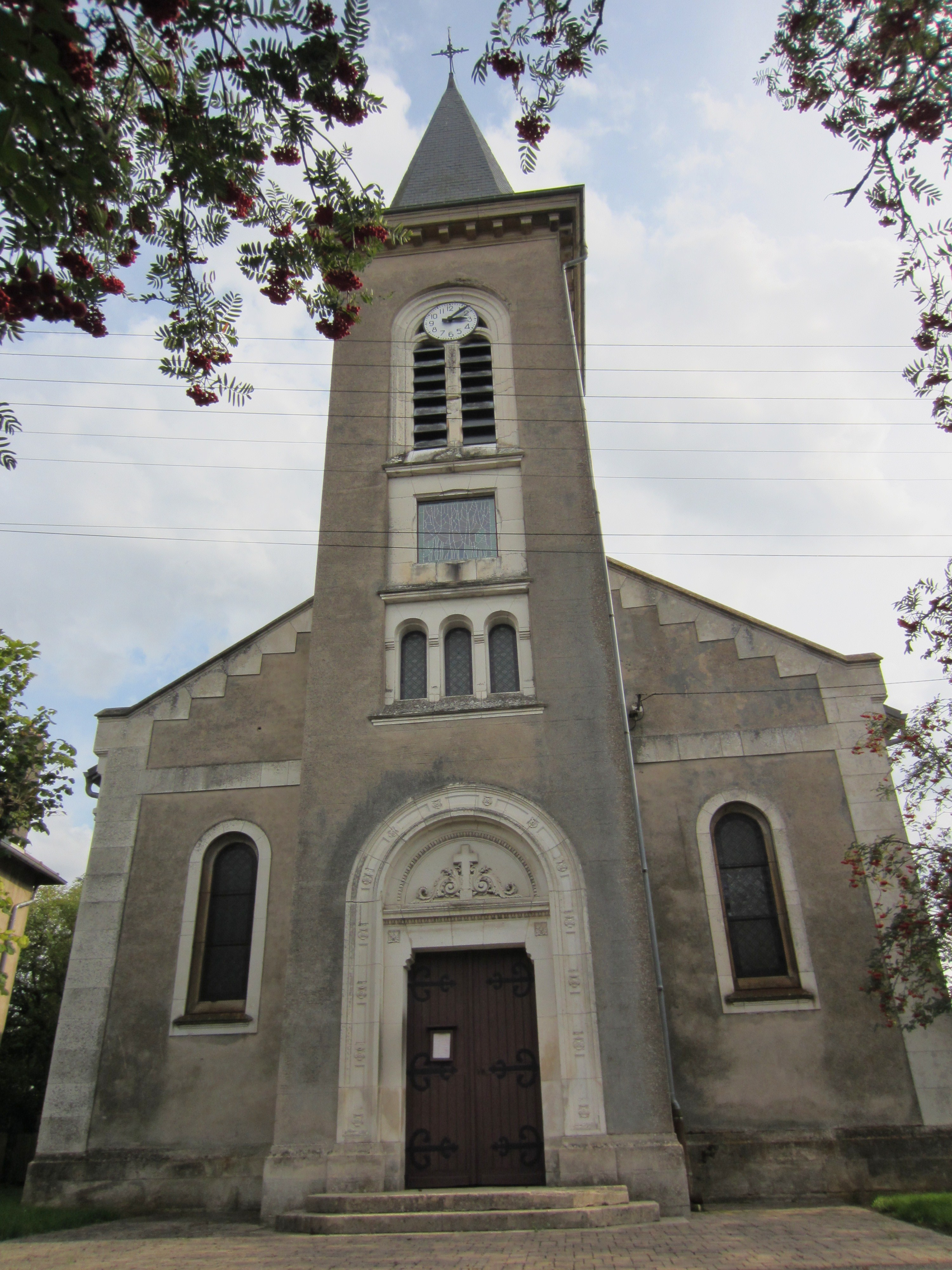
- The church in Dampvitoux

- Coat of arms
- Location of Dampvitoux
- Location within France Location within Grand Est
- Coordinates: 49°00′49″N 5°50′37″E
- Country: France
- Region: Grand Est
- Department: Meurthe-et-Moselle
- Arrondissement: Toul
- Canton: Jarny
- Intercommunality: Mad et Moselle

Government
  - Mayor (2020–2026): Damien Dussoul
- Area^{1}: 9.19 km^{2} (3.55 sq mi)
- Elevation: 247 m (810 ft)
- Highest elevation: 253 m (830 ft)
- Lowest elevation: 209 m (686 ft)
- Population (2023): 55
  - Density: 6.0/km^{2} (16/sq mi)
- Time zone: UTC+01:00 (CET)
  - Summer (DST): UTC+02:00 (CEST)
- INSEE/Postal code: 54153 /54470
- ^{1} French Land Register data, which excludes lakes, ponds, glaciers > 1 km^{2} (0.386 sq mi or 247 acres) and river estuaries.

Dampvitoux (French pronunciation: [dɑ̃vitu]) is a commune in the Meurthe-et-Moselle department in north-eastern France.

== History ==
The village was part of the Three Bishoprics, in the diocese of Metz. A church was built in 1790. The village was damaged during the First World War.

== See also ==
- Communes of the Meurthe-et-Moselle department
- Lorraine Regional Natural Park
