= Homécourt =

- Commune
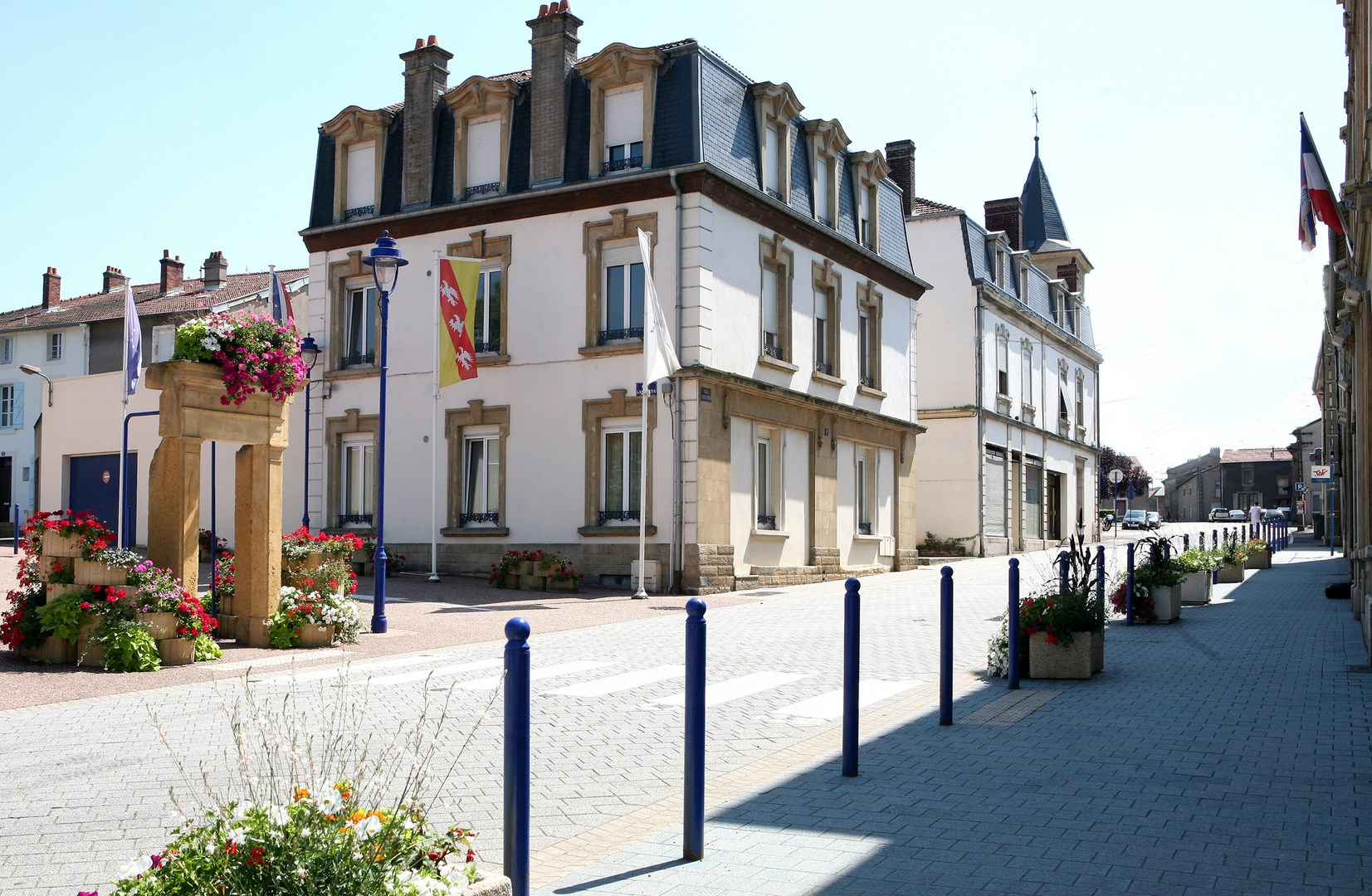
- The town hall in Homécourt

- Coat of arms
- Location of Homécourt
- Location within France Location within Grand Est
- Coordinates: 49°13′25″N 5°59′36″E
- Country: France
- Region: Grand Est
- Department: Meurthe-et-Moselle
- Arrondissement: Val-de-Briey
- Canton: Jarny
- Intercommunality: CC Orne Lorraine Confluences

Government
  - Mayor (2024–2026): Jean Toniolo
- Area^{1}: 4.44 km^{2} (1.71 sq mi)
- Elevation: 194 m (636 ft)
- Highest elevation: 282 m (925 ft)
- Lowest elevation: 175 m (574 ft)
- Population (2023): 6,254
  - Density: 1,410/km^{2} (3,650/sq mi)
- Time zone: UTC+01:00 (CET)
  - Summer (DST): UTC+02:00 (CEST)
- INSEE/Postal code: 54263 /54310
- ^{1} French Land Register data, which excludes lakes, ponds, glaciers > 1 km^{2} (0.386 sq mi or 247 acres) and river estuaries.

Homécourt (French pronunciation: [ɔmekuʁ]) is a commune in the Meurthe-et-Moselle department in north-eastern France.

== Population ==
Historical population
Year	Pop.	±% p.a.
1968	10,616	—
1975	10,156	−0.63%
1982	8,220	−2.98%
1990	7,088	−1.84%
1999	6,817	−0.43%
2007	6,512	−0.57%
2012	6,259	−0.79%
2017	6,176	−0.27%
2023	6,254	+0.21%
Source: INSEE

== See also ==
- Communes of the Meurthe-et-Moselle department
