= Friauville =

- Commune
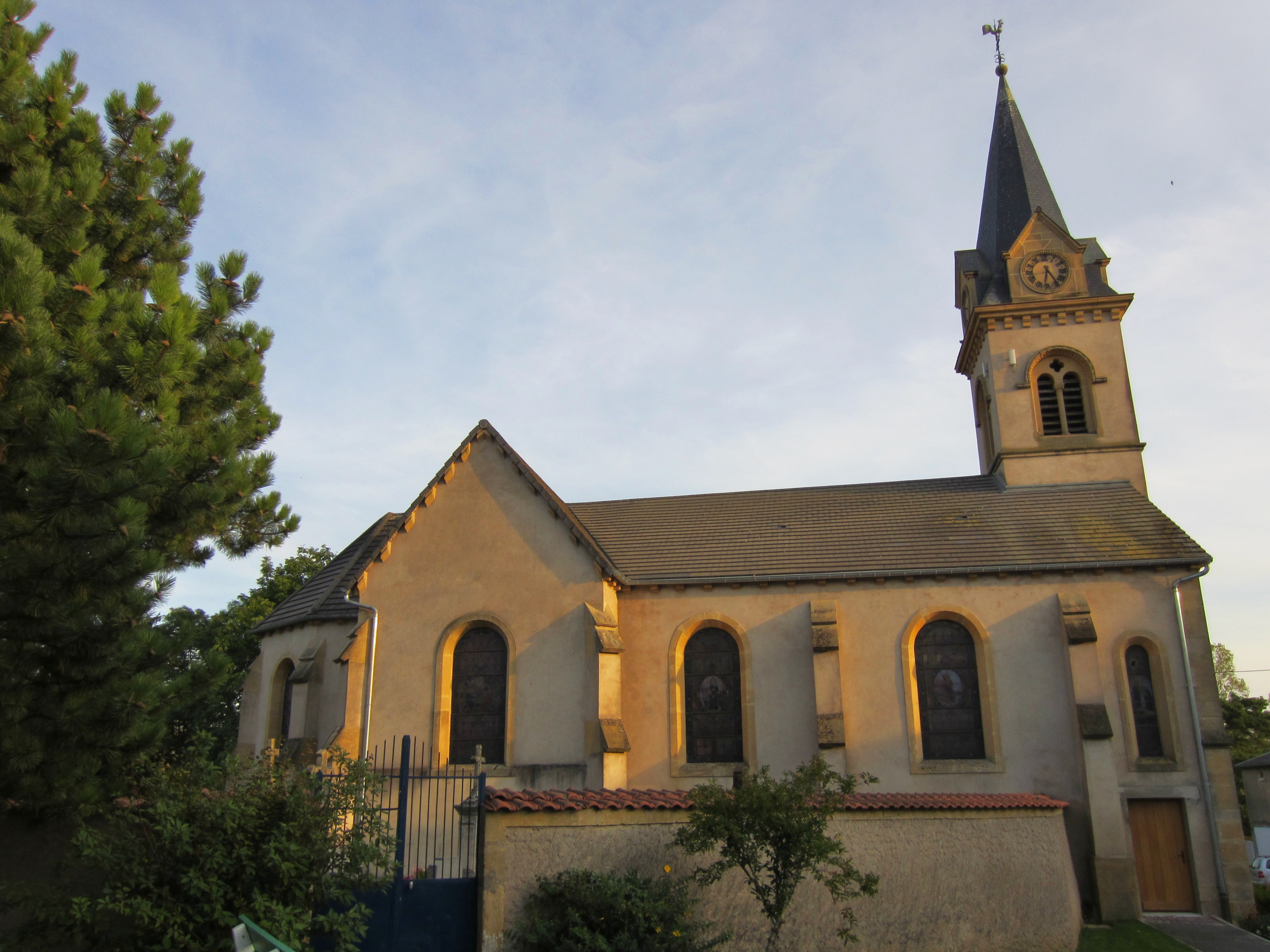
- The church in Friauville

- Coat of arms
- Location of Friauville
- Location within France Location within Grand Est
- Coordinates: 49°08′47″N 5°50′32″E
- Country: France
- Region: Grand Est
- Department: Meurthe-et-Moselle
- Arrondissement: Val-de-Briey
- Canton: Jarny
- Intercommunality: Orne Lorraine Confluences

Government
  - Mayor (2020–2026): Christian Guirlinger
- Area^{1}: 6.34 km^{2} (2.45 sq mi)
- Elevation: 200 m (660 ft)
- Highest elevation: 221 m (725 ft)
- Lowest elevation: 187 m (614 ft)
- Population (2023): 364
  - Density: 57.4/km^{2} (149/sq mi)
- Time zone: UTC+01:00 (CET)
  - Summer (DST): UTC+02:00 (CEST)
- INSEE/Postal code: 54213 /54800
- ^{1} French Land Register data, which excludes lakes, ponds, glaciers > 1 km^{2} (0.386 sq mi or 247 acres) and river estuaries.

Friauville (French pronunciation: [fʁijovil]) is a commune in the Meurthe-et-Moselle department in north-eastern France.

== See also ==
- Communes of the Meurthe-et-Moselle department
