= Doncourt-lès-Conflans =

- Commune
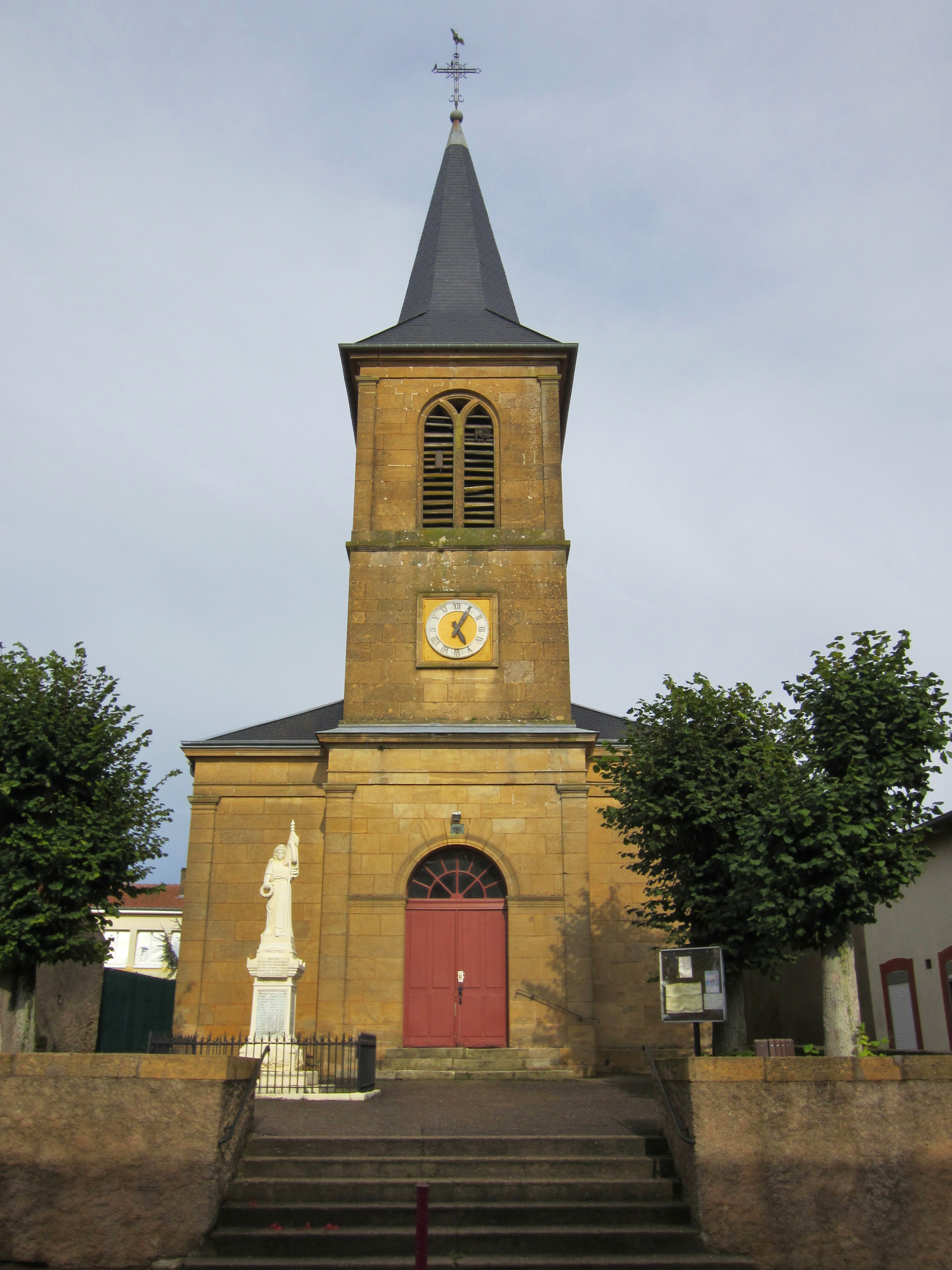
- The church in Doncourt-lès-Conflans

- Coat of arms
- Location of Doncourt-lès-Conflans
- Location within France Location within Grand Est
- Coordinates: 49°08′41″N 5°56′05″E
- Country: France
- Region: Grand Est
- Department: Meurthe-et-Moselle
- Arrondissement: Val-de-Briey
- Canton: Jarny
- Intercommunality: Orne Lorraine Confluences

Government
  - Mayor (2022–2026): Bernard Robert
- Area^{1}: 7.34 km^{2} (2.83 sq mi)
- Elevation: 246 m (807 ft)
- Highest elevation: 282 m (925 ft)
- Lowest elevation: 202 m (663 ft)
- Population (2023): 1,110
  - Density: 151/km^{2} (392/sq mi)
- Time zone: UTC+01:00 (CET)
  - Summer (DST): UTC+02:00 (CEST)
- INSEE/Postal code: 54171 /54800
- ^{1} French Land Register data, which excludes lakes, ponds, glaciers > 1 km^{2} (0.386 sq mi or 247 acres) and river estuaries.

Doncourt-lès-Conflans (French pronunciation: [dɔ̃kuʁ lɛ kɔ̃flɑ̃]) is a commune in the Meurthe-et-Moselle department in north-eastern France. It is the location of the Doncourt-lès-Conflans Airport, a general aviation facility.

== Geography ==
=== Climate ===
Doncourt-lès-Conflans has an oceanic climate (Köppen climate classification Cfb). The average annual temperature in Doncourt-lès-Conflans is 10.7 °C (51.3 °F). The average annual rainfall is 710.3 mm (27.96 in) with May as the wettest month. The temperatures are highest on average in July, at around 19.3 °C (66.7 °F), and lowest in January, at around 2.5 °C (36.5 °F). The highest temperature ever recorded in Doncourt-lès-Conflans was 40.9 °C (105.6 °F) on 25 July 2019; the coldest temperature ever recorded was −16.5 °C (2.3 °F) on 26 December 2010.

Climate data for Doncourt-lès-Conflans (1991−2020 normals, extremes 2005−present)
Month	Jan	Feb	Mar	Apr	May	Jun	Jul	Aug	Sep	Oct	Nov	Dec	Year
Record high °C (°F)	14.7 (58.5)	21.5 (70.7)	26.0 (78.8)	28.8 (83.8)	33.3 (91.9)	36.7 (98.1)	40.9 (105.6)	38.1 (100.6)	36.2 (97.2)	26.9 (80.4)	21.6 (70.9)	16.1 (61.0)	40.9 (105.6)
Mean daily maximum °C (°F)	5.2 (41.4)	6.8 (44.2)	11.4 (52.5)	16.8 (62.2)	19.9 (67.8)	23.8 (74.8)	26.1 (79.0)	24.9 (76.8)	21.5 (70.7)	15.7 (60.3)	9.6 (49.3)	6.0 (42.8)	15.6 (60.1)
Daily mean °C (°F)	2.5 (36.5)	3.3 (37.9)	6.4 (43.5)	10.3 (50.5)	13.7 (56.7)	17.2 (63.0)	19.3 (66.7)	18.7 (65.7)	15.4 (59.7)	11.3 (52.3)	6.5 (43.7)	3.4 (38.1)	10.7 (51.3)
Mean daily minimum °C (°F)	−0.3 (31.5)	−0.2 (31.6)	1.4 (34.5)	3.8 (38.8)	7.5 (45.5)	10.7 (51.3)	12.6 (54.7)	12.4 (54.3)	9.2 (48.6)	6.9 (44.4)	3.5 (38.3)	0.7 (33.3)	5.7 (42.3)
Record low °C (°F)	−14.7 (5.5)	−16.0 (3.2)	−10.7 (12.7)	−6.9 (19.6)	−3.4 (25.9)	1.1 (34.0)	2.3 (36.1)	3.1 (37.6)	−1.3 (29.7)	−6.1 (21.0)	−9.3 (15.3)	−16.5 (2.3)	−16.5 (2.3)
Average precipitation mm (inches)	56.7 (2.23)	53.2 (2.09)	55.1 (2.17)	38.8 (1.53)	72.1 (2.84)	65.6 (2.58)	60.3 (2.37)	67.0 (2.64)	54.2 (2.13)	58.9 (2.32)	57.7 (2.27)	70.7 (2.78)	710.3 (27.96)
Average precipitation days (≥ 1.0 mm)	12.0	10.5	9.9	6.9	10.5	9.5	8.9	9.5	7.5	9.6	11.4	12.6	118.8
Source: Météo-France

== See also ==
- Communes of the Meurthe-et-Moselle department
