= Hatrize =

- Commune
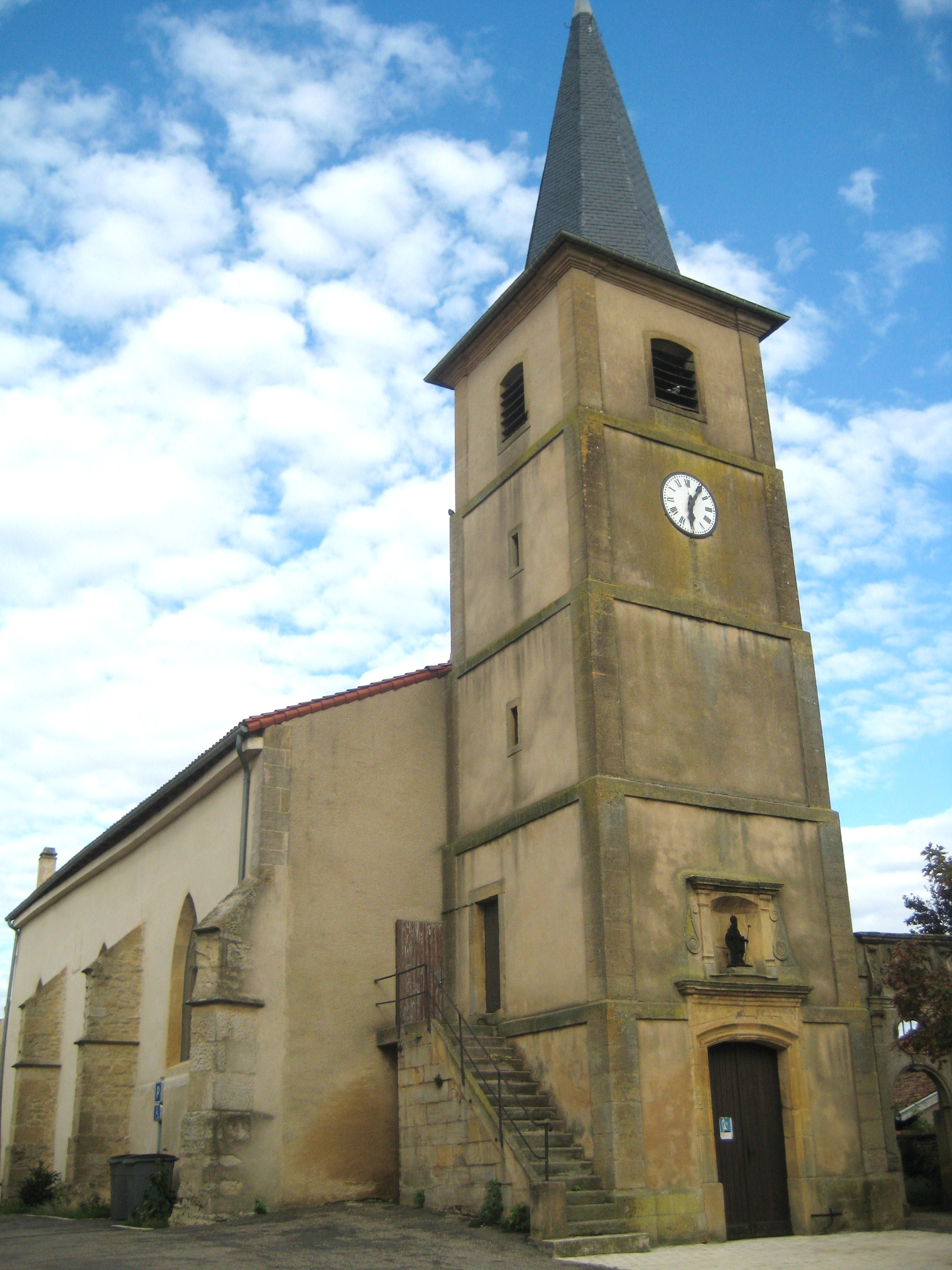
- The church in Hatrize

- Coat of arms
- Location of Hatrize
- Location within France Location within Grand Est
- Coordinates: 49°11′33″N 5°54′30″E
- Country: France
- Region: Grand Est
- Department: Meurthe-et-Moselle
- Arrondissement: Val-de-Briey
- Canton: Jarny
- Intercommunality: CC Orne Lorraine Confluences

Government
  - Mayor (2020–2026): Gérard Hypolite
- Area^{1}: 7.4 km^{2} (2.9 sq mi)
- Elevation: 198 m (650 ft)
- Highest elevation: 236 m (774 ft)
- Lowest elevation: 182 m (597 ft)
- Population (2023): 838
  - Density: 110/km^{2} (290/sq mi)
- Time zone: UTC+01:00 (CET)
  - Summer (DST): UTC+02:00 (CEST)
- INSEE/Postal code: 54253 /54800
- ^{1} French Land Register data, which excludes lakes, ponds, glaciers > 1 km^{2} (0.386 sq mi or 247 acres) and river estuaries.

Hatrize (French pronunciation: [atʁiz]) is a commune in the Meurthe-et-Moselle department in north-eastern France.

== See also ==
- Communes of the Meurthe-et-Moselle department
