= Allamont =

- Commune
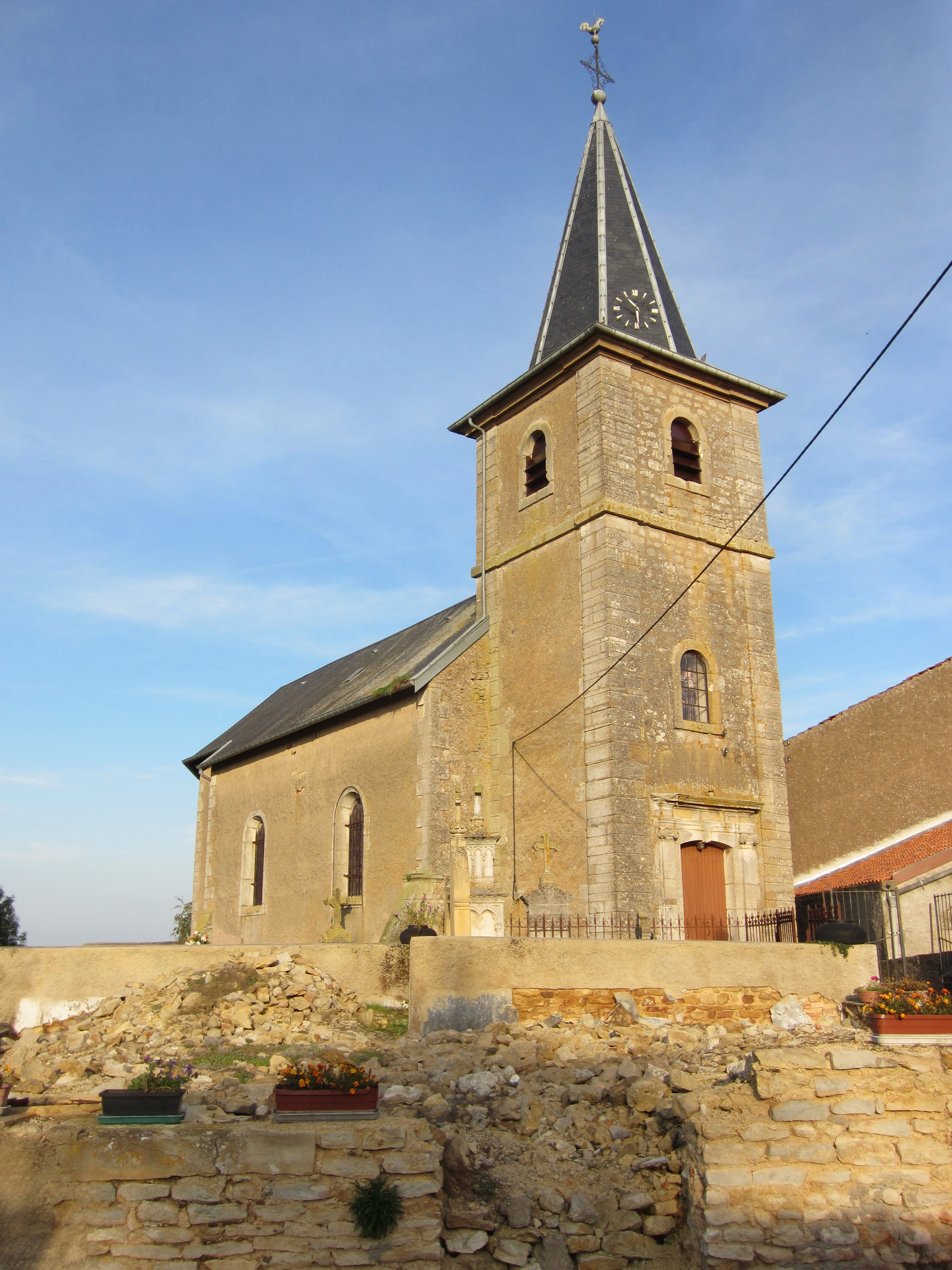
- The church in Allamont

- Coat of arms
- Location of Allamont
- Location within France Location within Grand Est
- Coordinates: 49°07′26″N 5°45′45″E
- Country: France
- Region: Grand Est
- Department: Meurthe-et-Moselle
- Arrondissement: Val-de-Briey
- Canton: Jarny
- Intercommunality: Orne Lorraine Confluences

Government
  - Mayor (2020–2026): Jean-Luc Pouillion
- Area^{1}: 9.06 km^{2} (3.50 sq mi)
- Elevation: 216 m (709 ft)
- Highest elevation: 219 m (719 ft)
- Lowest elevation: 190 m (620 ft)
- Population (2023): 156
  - Density: 17.2/km^{2} (44.6/sq mi)
- Time zone: UTC+01:00 (CET)
  - Summer (DST): UTC+02:00 (CEST)
- INSEE/Postal code: 54009 /54800
- ^{1} French Land Register data, which excludes lakes, ponds, glaciers > 1 km^{2} (0.386 sq mi or 247 acres) and river estuaries.

Allamont (French pronunciation: [alamɔ̃]) is a commune in the Meurthe-et-Moselle department in northeastern France.

== Population ==
Historical population
| Year | Pop. | ±% p.a. |
|---|---|---|
| 1968 | 136 | — |
| 1975 | 124 | −1.31% |
| 1982 | 112 | −1.44% |
| 1990 | 136 | +2.46% |
| 1999 | 110 | −2.33% |
| 2007 | 126 | +1.71% |
| 2012 | 154 | +4.10% |
| 2017 | 158 | +0.51% |
| 2023 | 156 | −0.21% |
Source: INSEE

== See also ==
- Communes of the Meurthe-et-Moselle department
