= Jeandelize =

- Commune
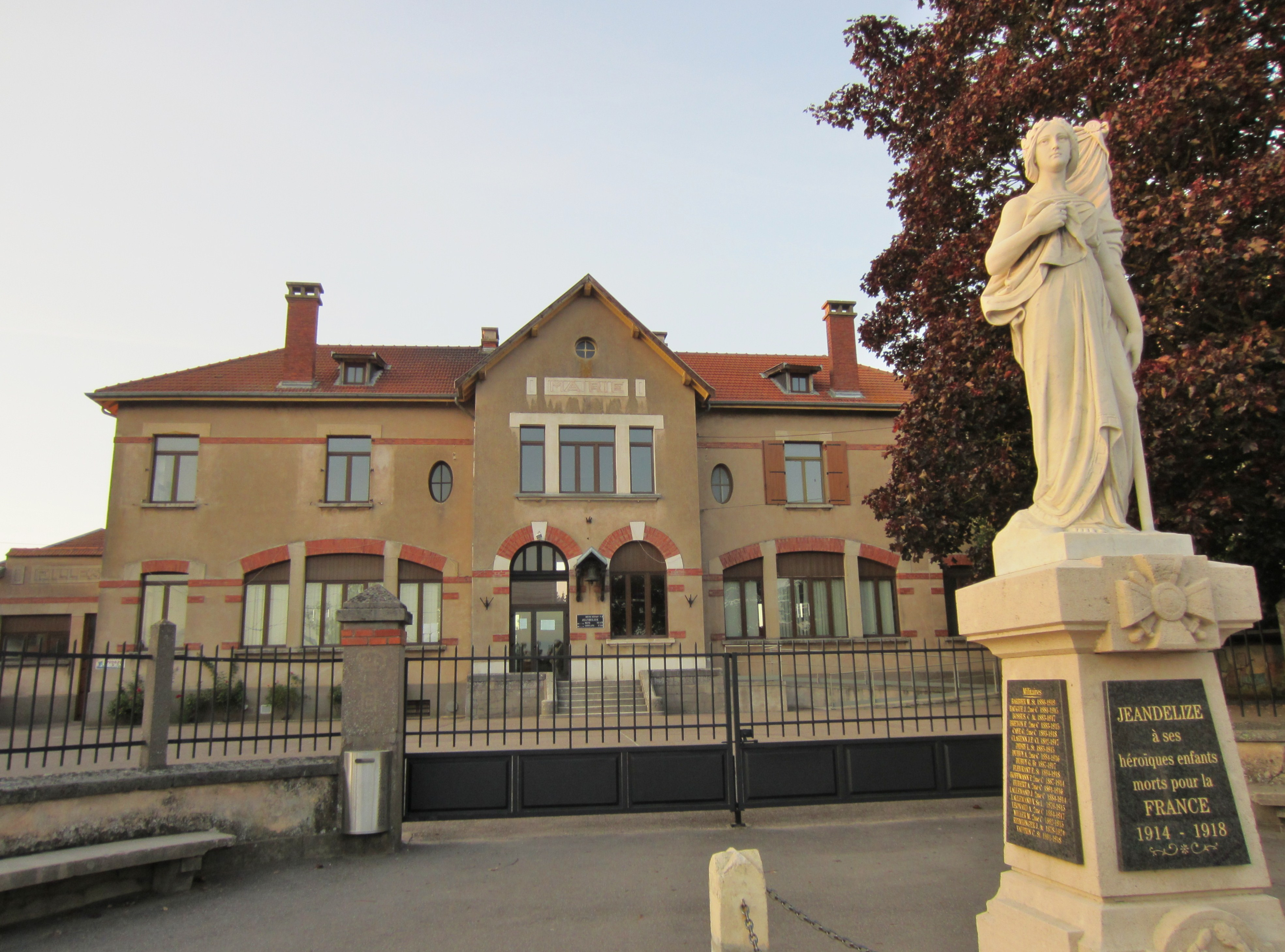
- The town hall in Jeandelize

- Coat of arms
- Location of Jeandelize
- Location within France Location within Grand Est
- Coordinates: 49°09′48″N 5°47′24″E
- Country: France
- Region: Grand Est
- Department: Meurthe-et-Moselle
- Arrondissement: Val-de-Briey
- Canton: Jarny
- Intercommunality: Orne Lorraine Confluences

Government
  - Mayor (2020–2026): Didier Valence
- Area^{1}: 6.75 km^{2} (2.61 sq mi)
- Elevation: 194 m (636 ft)
- Highest elevation: 215 m (705 ft)
- Lowest elevation: 187 m (614 ft)
- Population (2023): 375
  - Density: 55.6/km^{2} (144/sq mi)
- Time zone: UTC+01:00 (CET)
  - Summer (DST): UTC+02:00 (CEST)
- INSEE/Postal code: 54277 /54800
- ^{1} French Land Register data, which excludes lakes, ponds, glaciers > 1 km^{2} (0.386 sq mi or 247 acres) and river estuaries.

Jeandelize (French pronunciation: [ʒɑ̃dliz]) is a commune in the Meurthe-et-Moselle department in north-eastern France.

== Population ==
Historical population
Year	Pop.	±% p.a.
1968	384	—
1975	356	−1.08%
1982	353	−0.12%
1990	373	+0.69%
1999	358	−0.46%
2007	406	+1.59%
2012	387	−0.95%
2017	374	−0.68%
2023	375	+0.04%
Source: INSEE

== See also ==
- Communes of the Meurthe-et-Moselle department
