= Moineville =

- Commune
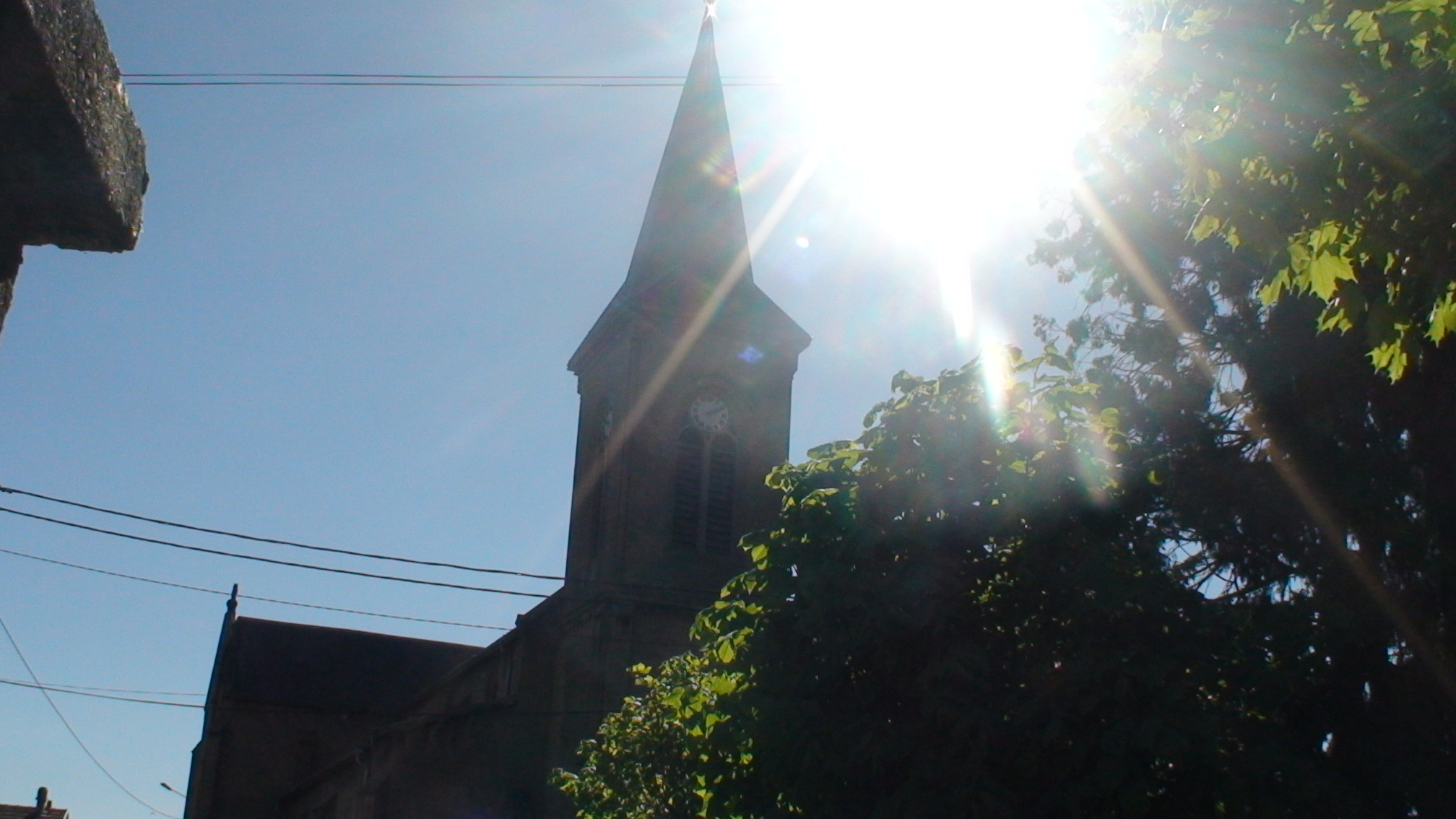
- The church in Moineville

- Coat of arms
- Location of Moineville
- Location within France Location within Grand Est
- Coordinates: 49°12′26″N 5°56′40″E
- Country: France
- Region: Grand Est
- Department: Meurthe-et-Moselle
- Arrondissement: Val-de-Briey
- Canton: Jarny
- Intercommunality: CC Orne Lorraine Confluences

Government
  - Mayor (2020–2026): Christian Lombard
- Area^{1}: 8.12 km^{2} (3.14 sq mi)
- Elevation: 190 m (620 ft)
- Highest elevation: 248 m (814 ft)
- Lowest elevation: 180 m (590 ft)
- Population (2023): 1,114
  - Density: 137/km^{2} (355/sq mi)
- Time zone: UTC+01:00 (CET)
  - Summer (DST): UTC+02:00 (CEST)
- INSEE/Postal code: 54371 /54580
- ^{1} French Land Register data, which excludes lakes, ponds, glaciers > 1 km^{2} (0.386 sq mi or 247 acres) and river estuaries.

Moineville (French pronunciation: [mwanvil]) is a commune in the Meurthe-et-Moselle department in north-eastern France.

== See also ==
- Communes of the Meurthe-et-Moselle department
