= Canton of Jarny =

Canton in Grand Est, France

Coordinates: 49.16°N 5.88°E

The canton of Jarny is an administrative division of the Meurthe-et-Moselle department, northeastern France. It was created at the French canton reorganisation which came into effect in March 2015. Its seat is in Jarny.

It consists of the following communes:

1. Allamont
2. Auboué
3. Batilly
4. Boncourt
5. Brainville
6. Bruville
7. Chambley-Bussières
8. Conflans-en-Jarnisy
9. Dampvitoux
10. Doncourt-lès-Conflans
11. Friauville
12. Giraumont
13. Hagéville
14. Hannonville-Suzémont
15. Hatrize
16. Homécourt
17. Jarny
18. Jeandelize
19. Jouaville
20. Labry
21. Mars-la-Tour
22. Moineville
23. Moutiers
24. Olley
25. Puxe
26. Puxieux
27. Saint-Ail
28. Saint-Julien-lès-Gorze
29. Saint-Marcel
30. Sponville
31. Tronville
32. Valleroy
33. Ville-sur-Yron
34. Xonville
