= Population without double counting =

English translation of a French phrase

Population without double counting is an English translation of the French phrase Population sans doubles comptes.

In France, for the purposes of the census, the INSEE has defined several population indicators that allow people who live in more than one place to be counted in each place, to study and keep count of population movement. So each commune in France does not have only one figure for the population, but several; for example students may be counted both where they study and where they live when not studying. A parallel may be drawn to English laws that allow students to register and vote in local elections in more than one place.

== How it is measured ==
The population figures of France depend on the definition of "French". INSEE, the French national statistics bureau has two definitions:

- All of the 65,585,857 people (as of 1 January 2013) who reside in France, including 33,817,227 women and 31,768,630 men which is 235,676 more people than 1 January 2012. This is the definition used most frequently, especially by INSEE for censuses that count all people residing in France, regardless of their nationality. French is the demonym of France, that is to say that people who live in France are called French. The census of people residing in France, regardless of nationality, is provided by INSEE under the vocabulary Total population of France. As of 1 January 2008, the population of France was 63,753,140 inhabitants residing in Mainland France, Réunion, Mayotte, Martinique, Guadeloupe and French Guiana.
- All of the 63,379,349 people as of 1 January 2013 of French nationality (i.e. French Passport Holders), whether they live in France or abroad. They are the citizens of the French Republic "without distinction of origin, race, or religion". The Civil Code defines French nationality, the conditions for obtaining it and the rights and duties inherent to it. The number of French (in the sense of "persons having French nationality") is estimated on 1 January 2013 to be 65,585,857 inhabitants minus 3,817,562 foreigners, plus 1,611,054 expatriate French nationals which gives the total number of French Nationals to be 63,379,349.

== Statistical view ==
The figures given by INSEE for a particular commune are:

Population municipale
a count of the people who live in a house, flat etc. in the commune
Population comptée à part
those living in a collective or temporary manner (prisoners, soldiers, hospital patients, nuns, monks, students)
Population totale
the sum of population municipale and population comptée à part
Doubles comptes
a sub-division of population comptée à part, comprising those who have a second residence in another commune and are already counted in that commune's population municipale
Population sans doubles comptes
the population totale minus the doubles comptes

The population sans doubles comptes is therefore always no smaller than the population municipale and no larger than the population totale.

To evaluate the population properly, one should use the population sans doubles comptes.

Since 1999, places with fewer than 10,000 inhabitants have had a census every five years, with one-fifth of the places each year being subject to census.

Since 2004, places with 10,000 inhabitants or more have an annual census of a sample 8% of the population. This is carried out in January and February. A census collector leaves a questionnaire and collects it at a later date. Since this time, population municipale and population sans doubles comptes have had the same meaning.

== Legal aspects ==
Census results are official by law.

The population totale is used when applying rules and regulations to budget and finance, in particular in section R2151-2 of the Code of Territorial Collectives. But the population municipale determines the size of a council and the scrutiny of municipal elections, R2151-3.
