= Route nationale 52 =

National road in France

National road 52
- Route nationale 52

Route information
- Part of E411
- Maintained by DIR EST
- Length: 66 km (41 mi)

Major junctions
- South end: D 953 at Woippy

- E411 / A 30 at Uckange; E44 / N 18 at Longwy
- North end: E411 / A28 at Mont-Saint-Martin

Location
- Country: France

Highway system
- Roads in France; Autoroutes; Routes nationales

The Route Nationale 52 is a French trunk road (Route nationale) between Woippy and Mont-Saint-Martin (Belgium). This road is a dual carriageway between Rombas and Fameck and between Crusnes and Aubange (Belgium). It is also a two-way road between Marange-Silvange and Rombas, while it formerly fan between Metz and Marange-Silvange and between Fameck and Crusnes. Route Nationale has a crucial place in the Pays Haut (north of Meurthe-et-Moselle) as it serves as an essential access to the cities of Longwy in the northwest and Thionville and Metz in the southeast.

== Junctions (Rombas to Fameck) ==
Exit/Junction	Destination
Exit	(Rombas) Towns served: Rombas, Amnéville
Exit	(Clouange) Towns served: Clouange, Moyeuvre-Grande
	D 9 Towns served: Vitry-sur-Orne, Gandrange
	D 9 D 10 Towns served: Uckange, Gandrange
	A 30 Towns served: Fameck, Florange

== Junctions (Crusnes to Aubange) ==
Region	Department	Junction	Destinations	Notes
E411 / A 30 becomes E411 / N 52
Grand Est	Meurthe-et-Moselle	8 : Crusnes	Crusnes	
Grand Est	Meurthe-et-Moselle	9 : Bréhain-la-Ville	Bréhain-la-Ville, Fillières, Villerupt	
Grand Est	Meurthe-et-Moselle	Aire de Tiercelet (Eastbound)		
Grand Est	Meurthe-et-Moselle	10 : Tiercelet	Thil, Tiercelet, Hussigny-Godbrange	
Grand Est	Meurthe-et-Moselle	11 : Villers-la-Montagne	Villers-la-Montagne, Cutry, Hussigny-Godbrange	
Grand Est	Meurthe-et-Moselle	12 : Haucourt-Moulaine	Haucourt-Moulaine, Chenières, Herserange	
Grand Est	Meurthe-et-Moselle	13 : Mexy	Mexy, Haucourt-Moulaine - St Charles, Longwy - centre, Longwy - Bas, Réhon	
Grand Est	Meurthe-et-Moselle	14 : Pulventeux	Reims, Longuyon, Montmédy, Lexy, Longwy - Z. I. Pulventeux	
Grand Est	Meurthe-et-Moselle	15 : Cosnes-et-Romain	Longwy, Cosnes-et-Romain	
Grand Est	Meurthe-et-Moselle	16 : Mont Saint Martin - centre	Mont-Saint-Martin - Plateau	
Grand Est	Meurthe-et-Moselle	17 : Mont Saint Martin-Val	Mont-Saint-Martin	
Grand Est	Meurthe-et-Moselle	18 : Longlaville	Mont-Saint-Martin - Pôle Européen, Longlaville	
French - Belgian Border ; E411 / N 52 becomes Belgian road E411 / A28
1.000 mi = 1.609 km; 1.000 km = 0.621 mi
