= Canton of Herserange =

Former canton in Meurthe-et-Moselle, France

Coordinates: 49°31′07″N 5°46′21″E

- Former canton
- Location of the canton in the arrondissement of Briey
- Country: France
- Region: Grand Est
- Department: Meurthe-et-Moselle
- No. of communes: {{{nbcomm}}}
- Disbanded: 2015

Government
  - Representatives: Laurent Righi
- Area: 38.40 km^{2} (14.83 sq mi)
- Population (2012): 18,067
  - Density: 470.5/km^{2} (1,219/sq mi)

The canton of Herserange (French: Canton d'Herserange) is a former French canton located in the department of Meurthe-et-Moselle in the Lorraine region (now part of Grand Est). This canton was organized around Herserange in the arrondissement of Briey. It is now part of the canton of Longwy.

The last general councillor from this canton was Laurent Righi (PCF), elected in 1996.

== Composition ==
The canton of Herserange grouped together 25 municipalities and had 18,067 inhabitants (2012 census without double counts).

1. Haucourt-Moulaine
2. Herserange
3. Hussigny-Godbrange
4. Longlaville
5. Mexy
6. Saulnes
