= Prosper André =

French politician (1829–1883)

Prosper André (17 January 1829, Fillières - 15 July 1883) was a French republican politician. He was a member of the National Assembly in 1871. He belonged to the Centre gauche parliamentary group.
