= Uckange =

- Commune
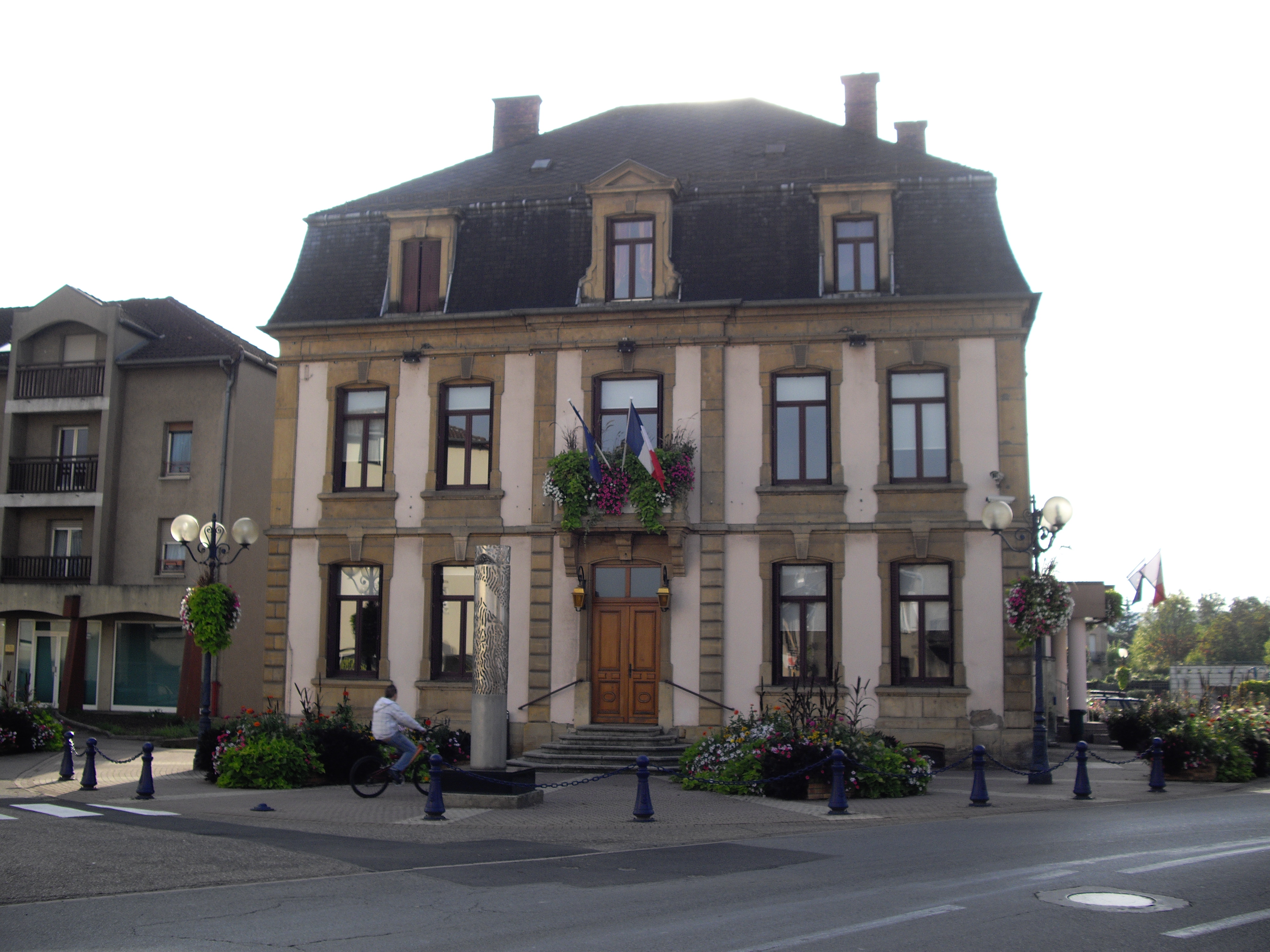
- The town hall in Uckange

- Coat of arms
- Location of Uckange
- Location within France Location within Grand Est
- Coordinates: 49°18′11″N 6°09′21″E
- Country: France
- Region: Grand Est
- Department: Moselle
- Arrondissement: Thionville
- Canton: Fameck
- Intercommunality: CA Val de Fensch

Government
  - Mayor (2020–2026): Gérard Léonardi
- Area^{1}: 5.56 km^{2} (2.15 sq mi)
- Elevation: 157 m (515 ft)
- Highest elevation: 190 m (620 ft)
- Lowest elevation: 150 m (490 ft)
- Population (2023): 7,021
  - Density: 1,260/km^{2} (3,270/sq mi)
- Demonym: Uckangeois
- Time zone: UTC+01:00 (CET)
  - Summer (DST): UTC+02:00 (CEST)
- INSEE/Postal code: 57683 /57270
- ^{1} French Land Register data, which excludes lakes, ponds, glaciers > 1 km^{2} (0.386 sq mi or 247 acres) and river estuaries.

Uckange (French pronunciation: [ykɑ̃ʒ]; German: Ückingen; Lorraine Franconian: Ickéng/Ickéngen) is a commune in the Moselle department in Grand Est in north-eastern France. The inhabitants are called Uckangeois.

== History ==
The first traces of the Uckangeois date back to more than 6,000 years with the discovery in the 1960s of remains between Ébange and Uckange; located in a disputed area in the Middle Ages, the town of Uckange belonged for centuries to the former Duchy of Luxembourg, in the seigneury of Richemont-Rodemack. The village was ceded to France in 1659 (Treaty of the Pyrenees).

The town experienced its greatest expansion at the end of the 19th century, with the establishment of STUMM font factories.

Today this factory, which produced cast iron, is closed since 1991, but a blast furnace, the U4, remains and is considered as a historical monument.

This industrial heritage is the center of a vast cultural project since 2005. The first visits began in September–October 2007.

Although relatively modest, the city has known great importance in the past. Indeed, it was located near the Roman road leading to Trier, on the banks of the Moselle, which has had a railway network since 1850.

Uckange is also known by beer lovers because the company Ensel brewed beer from 1868 to 1940.

The town is also known for its bakery specialty, the Wagotine, produced since 1961.

== Population ==
Historical population
| Year | Pop. | ±% p.a. |
|---|---|---|
| 1968 | 10,326 | — |
| 1975 | 11,560 | +1.63% |
| 1982 | 9,524 | −2.73% |
| 1990 | 9,189 | −0.45% |
| 1999 | 7,905 | −1.66% |
| 2007 | 7,375 | −0.86% |
| 2012 | 6,648 | −2.05% |
| 2017 | 6,818 | +0.51% |
| 2023 | 7,021 | +0.49% |
Source: INSEE

== Geography ==
=== Climate ===
The local climate is mild with few extremes of temperature and ample precipitation in all months. The Köppen Climate Classification subtype for this climate is "Cfb" (Marine West Coast Climate). Many areas have rainfall in more than 150 days per year, although the precipitation is often of low intensity. Fog is common in autumn and winter, but thunderstorms are infrequent. Strong gales with high winds may be encountered in winter. Temperatures in the winter tend to be mild, while summer temperatures are moderate.

== Cultural heritage and architecture ==
=== U4 blast furnace park ===
The park is a cultural project housed in the old furnace. It includes, among other, art exhibitions and guided tours by former steel workers.

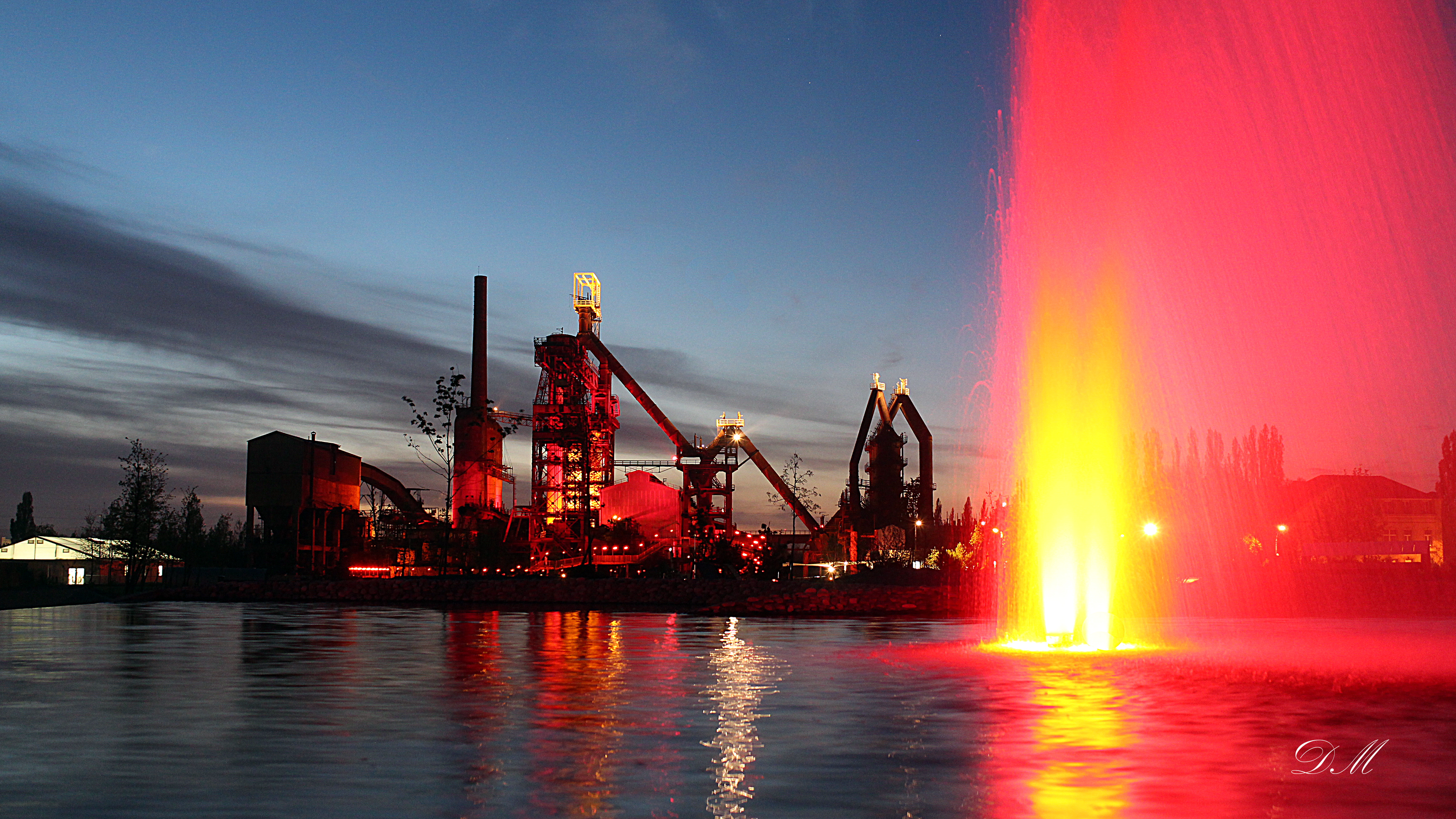
U4 furnace at night

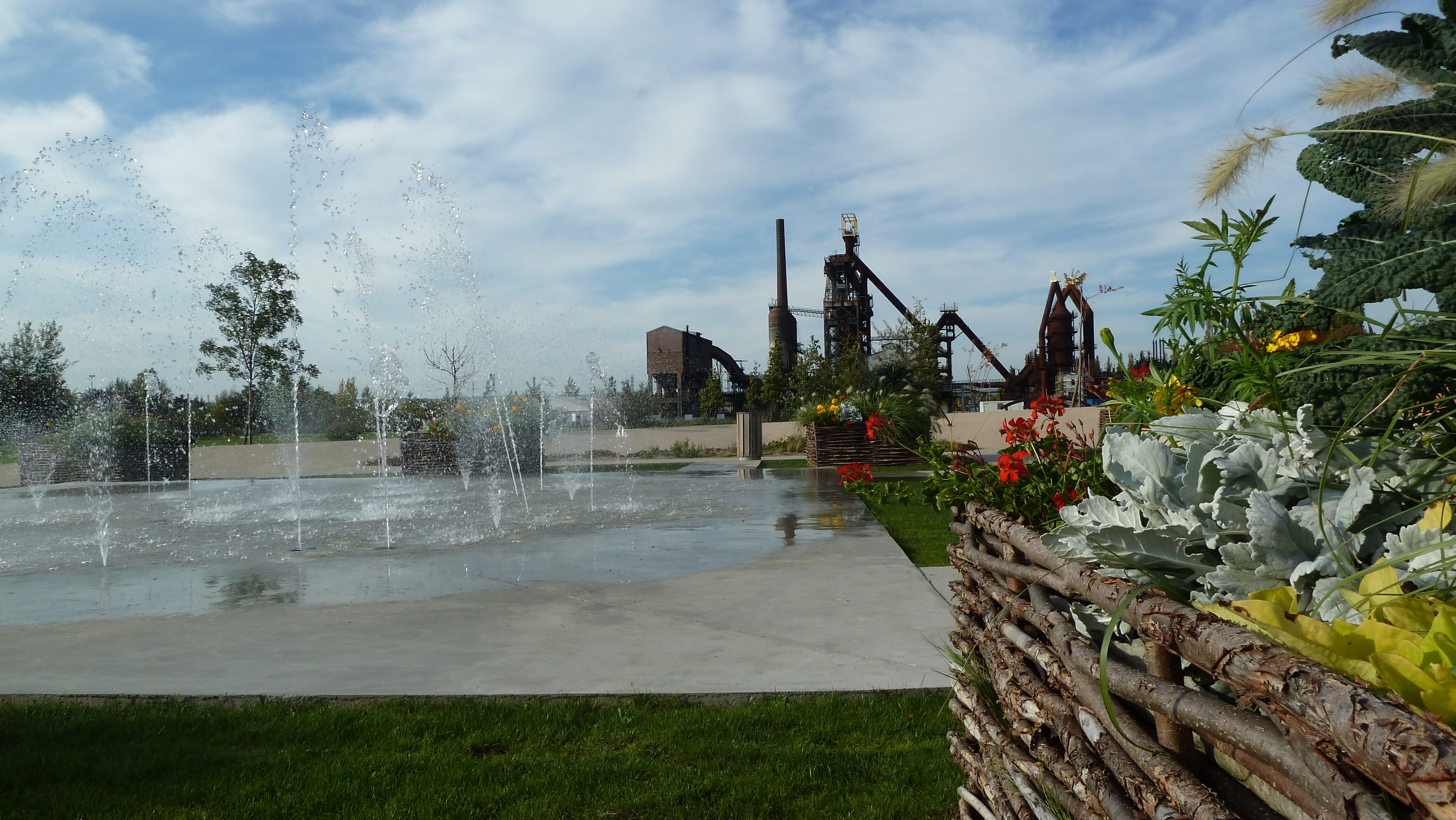
The garden of the park

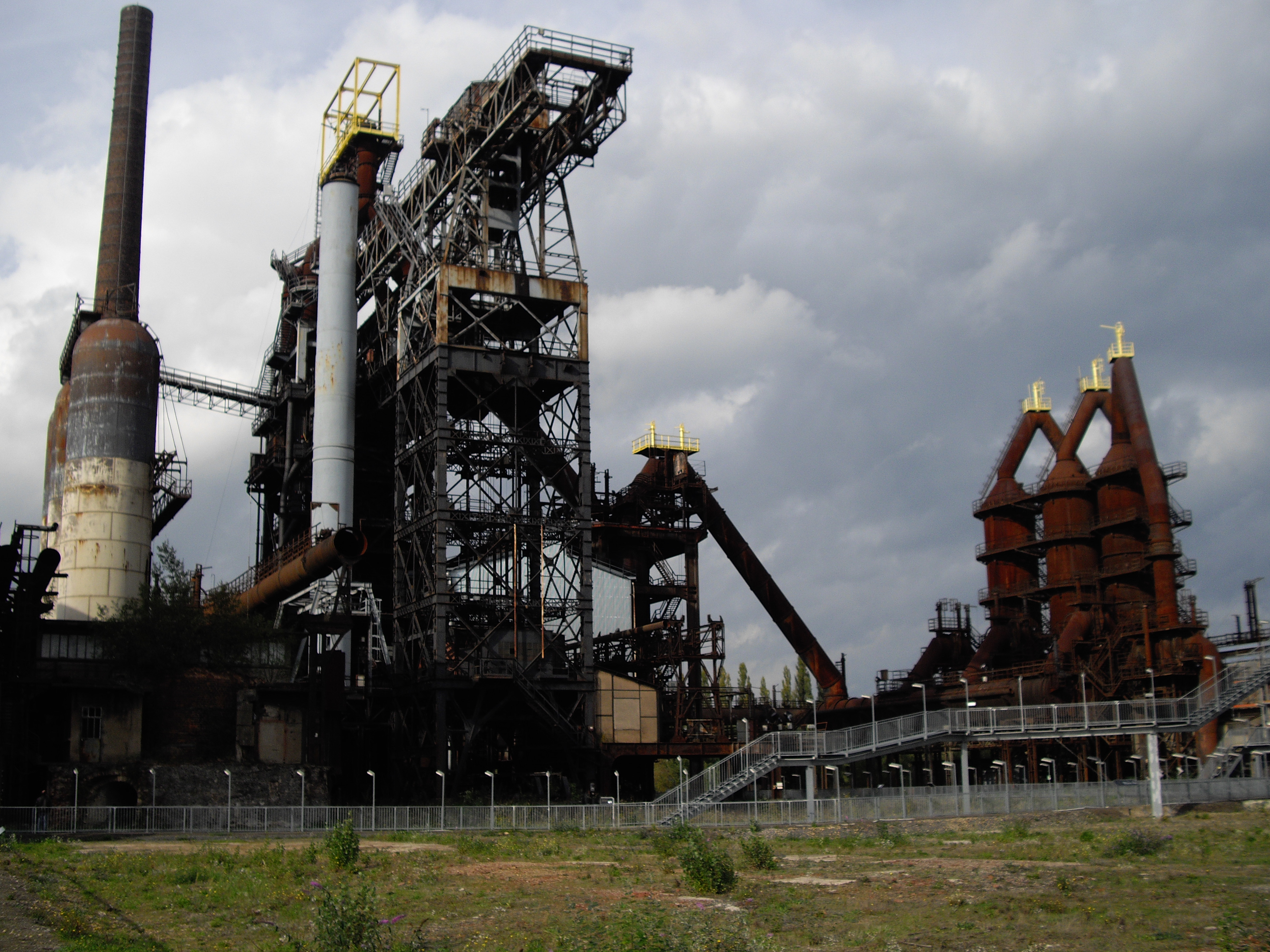

== Notable residents ==
- Carmelo Micciche
- Stéphane Haar

== See also ==
- Communes of the Moselle department
- List of preserved historic blast furnaces
