= Laix =

- Commune
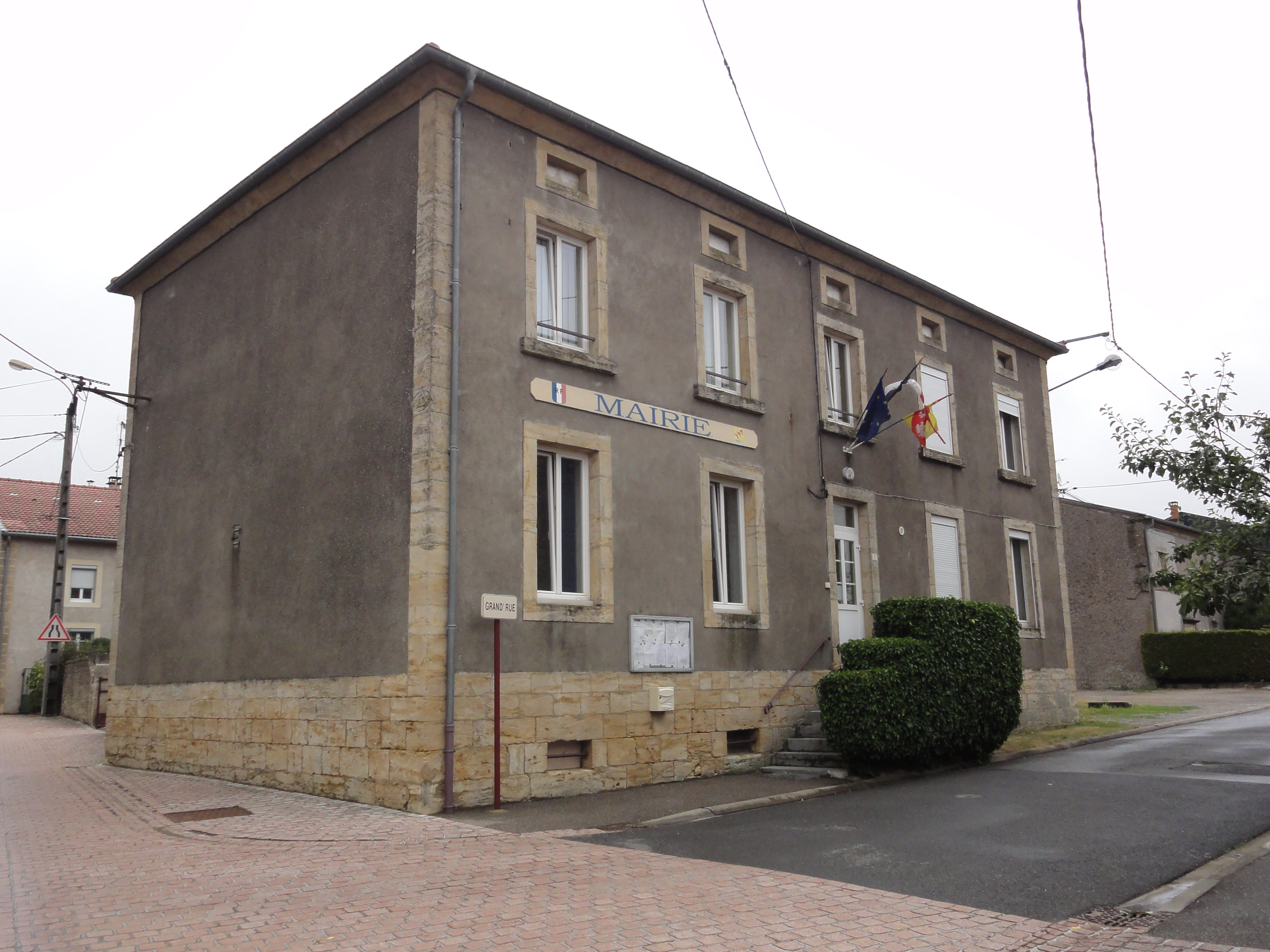
- The town hall in Laix

- Coat of arms
- Location of Laix
- Location within France Location within Grand Est
- Coordinates: 49°26′50″N 5°46′50″E
- Country: France
- Region: Grand Est
- Department: Meurthe-et-Moselle
- Arrondissement: Val-de-Briey
- Canton: Villerupt
- Intercommunality: Grand Longwy Agglomération

Government
  - Mayor (2020–2026): Hervé Jacquet
- Area^{1}: 7.55 km^{2} (2.92 sq mi)
- Elevation: 360 m (1,180 ft)
- Highest elevation: 397 m (1,302 ft)
- Lowest elevation: 275 m (902 ft)
- Population (2023): 211
  - Density: 27.9/km^{2} (72.4/sq mi)
- Time zone: UTC+01:00 (CET)
  - Summer (DST): UTC+02:00 (CEST)
- INSEE/Postal code: 54290 /54720
- ^{1} French Land Register data, which excludes lakes, ponds, glaciers > 1 km^{2} (0.386 sq mi or 247 acres) and river estuaries.

Laix is a commune in the Meurthe-et-Moselle department in northeastern France.

== See also ==
- Communes of the Meurthe-et-Moselle department
