= Grand Longwy Agglomération =

- Communauté d'agglomération
- Interactive map of Grand Longwy Agglomération
- Coordinates: 49°30′N 05°47′E
- Country: France
- Region: Grand Est
- Department: Meurthe-et-Moselle
- No. of communes: {{{nbcomm}}}
- Established: 1960
- Area: 173.5 km^{2} (67.0 sq mi)
- Population (2019): 62,433
  - Density: 359.8/km^{2} (932.0/sq mi)
- Website: grandlongwy.fr

Grand Longwy Agglomération (before September 2021: Communauté d'agglomération de Longwy) is the communauté d'agglomération, an intercommunal structure, centred on the town of Longwy. It is located in the Meurthe-et-Moselle department, in the Grand Est region, northeastern France. Created in 1960, its seat is in Longwy. Its area is 173.5 km^{2}. Its population was 62,433 in 2019, of which 14,774 in Longwy proper.

== Composition ==
The communauté d'agglomération consists of the following 21 communes:

1. Chenières
2. Cons-la-Grandville
3. Cosnes-et-Romain
4. Cutry
5. Fillières
6. Gorcy
7. Haucourt-Moulaine
8. Herserange
9. Hussigny-Godbrange
10. Laix
11. Lexy
12. Longlaville
13. Longwy
14. Mexy
15. Mont-Saint-Martin
16. Morfontaine
17. Réhon
18. Saulnes
19. Tiercelet
20. Ugny
21. Villers-la-Montagne
