= Canton of Villerupt =

Canton in Grand Est, France

Coordinates: 49.47°N 5.93°E

The canton of Villerupt is an administrative division of the Meurthe-et-Moselle department, northeastern France. Its borders were modified at the French canton reorganisation which came into effect in March 2015. Its seat is in Villerupt.

It consists of the following communes:

1. Bréhain-la-Ville
2. Crusnes
3. Errouville
4. Fillières
5. Hussigny-Godbrange
6. Laix
7. Longlaville
8. Morfontaine
9. Saulnes
10. Serrouville
11. Thil
12. Tiercelet
13. Villers-la-Montagne
14. Villerupt
