= Serrouville =

- Commune
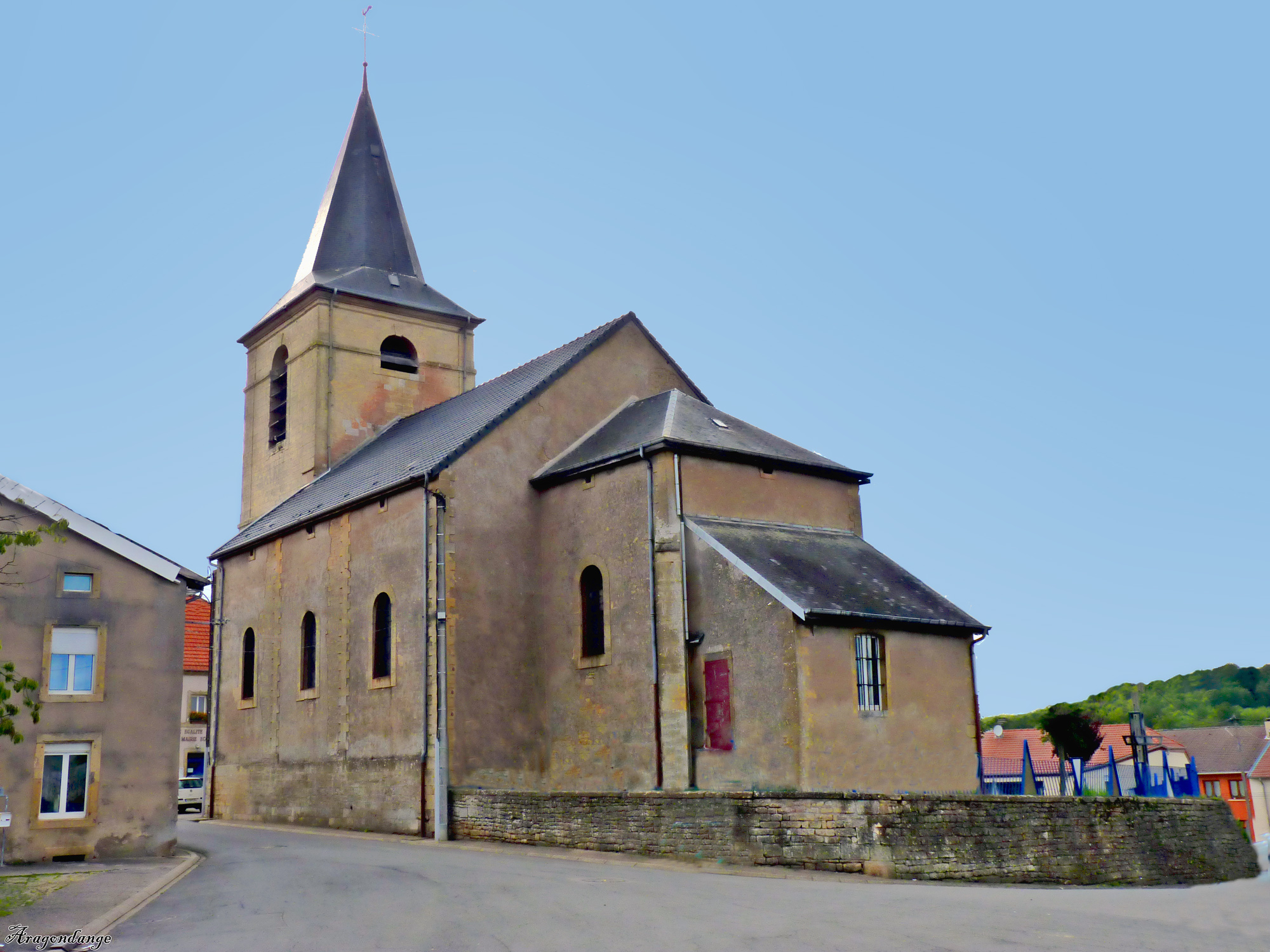
- The church in Serrouville

- Coat of arms
- Location of Serrouville
- Location within France Location within Grand Est
- Coordinates: 49°23′58″N 5°53′19″E
- Country: France
- Region: Grand Est
- Department: Meurthe-et-Moselle
- Arrondissement: Val-de-Briey
- Canton: Villerupt
- Intercommunality: Cœur du Pays-Haut

Government
  - Mayor (2020–2026): Patrice Picart
- Area^{1}: 15.57 km^{2} (6.01 sq mi)
- Elevation: 358 m (1,175 ft)
- Highest elevation: 398 m (1,306 ft)
- Lowest elevation: 280 m (920 ft)
- Population (2023): 683
  - Density: 43.9/km^{2} (114/sq mi)
- Time zone: UTC+01:00 (CET)
  - Summer (DST): UTC+02:00 (CEST)
- INSEE/Postal code: 54504 /54560
- ^{1} French Land Register data, which excludes lakes, ponds, glaciers > 1 km^{2} (0.386 sq mi or 247 acres) and river estuaries.

Serrouville (French pronunciation: [seʁuvil]; Luxembourgish: Sorsweller) is a commune in the Meurthe-et-Moselle department in north-eastern France.

== Population ==
Historical population
Year	Pop.	±% p.a.
1968	479	—
1975	449	−0.92%
1982	408	−1.36%
1990	472	+1.84%
1999	525	+1.19%
2007	600	+1.68%
2012	715	+3.57%
2017	683	−0.91%
2023	683	+0.00%
Source: INSEE

== See also ==
- Communes of the Meurthe-et-Moselle department
