= Errouville =

- Commune
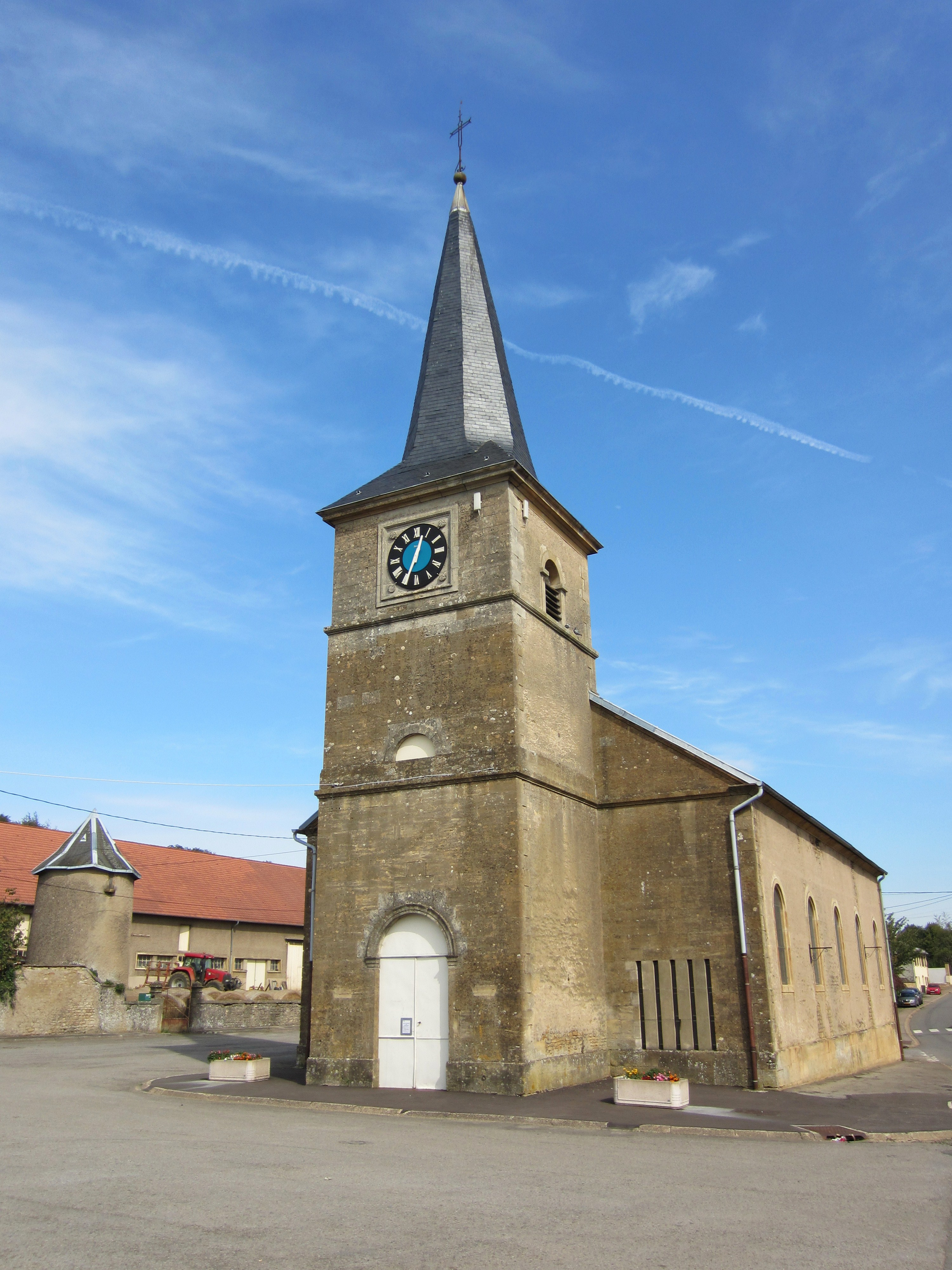
- The church in Errouville

- Coat of arms
- Location of Errouville
- Location within France Location within Grand Est
- Coordinates: 49°25′00″N 5°54′13″E
- Country: France
- Region: Grand Est
- Department: Meurthe-et-Moselle
- Arrondissement: Val-de-Briey
- Canton: Villerupt
- Intercommunality: Cœur du Pays-Haut

Government
  - Mayor (2020–2026): Roger Faust
- Area^{1}: 5.13 km^{2} (1.98 sq mi)
- Elevation: 355 m (1,165 ft)
- Highest elevation: 422 m (1,385 ft)
- Lowest elevation: 327 m (1,073 ft)
- Population (2023): 682
  - Density: 133/km^{2} (344/sq mi)
- Time zone: UTC+01:00 (CET)
  - Summer (DST): UTC+02:00 (CEST)
- INSEE/Postal code: 54181 /54680
- ^{1} French Land Register data, which excludes lakes, ponds, glaciers > 1 km^{2} (0.386 sq mi or 247 acres) and river estuaries.

Errouville (French pronunciation: [eʁuvil]; Lorrain: Arovelle, Luxembourgish: Arweller) is a commune in the Meurthe-et-Moselle department in north-eastern France.

As of 2019, it had 699 inhabitants.

== History ==
Between 1871 and 1914 Errouville found itself positioned on the Franco-German frontier.

== See also ==
- Communes of the Meurthe-et-Moselle department
