= Lexy, Meurthe-et-Moselle =

Lexy
- Commune
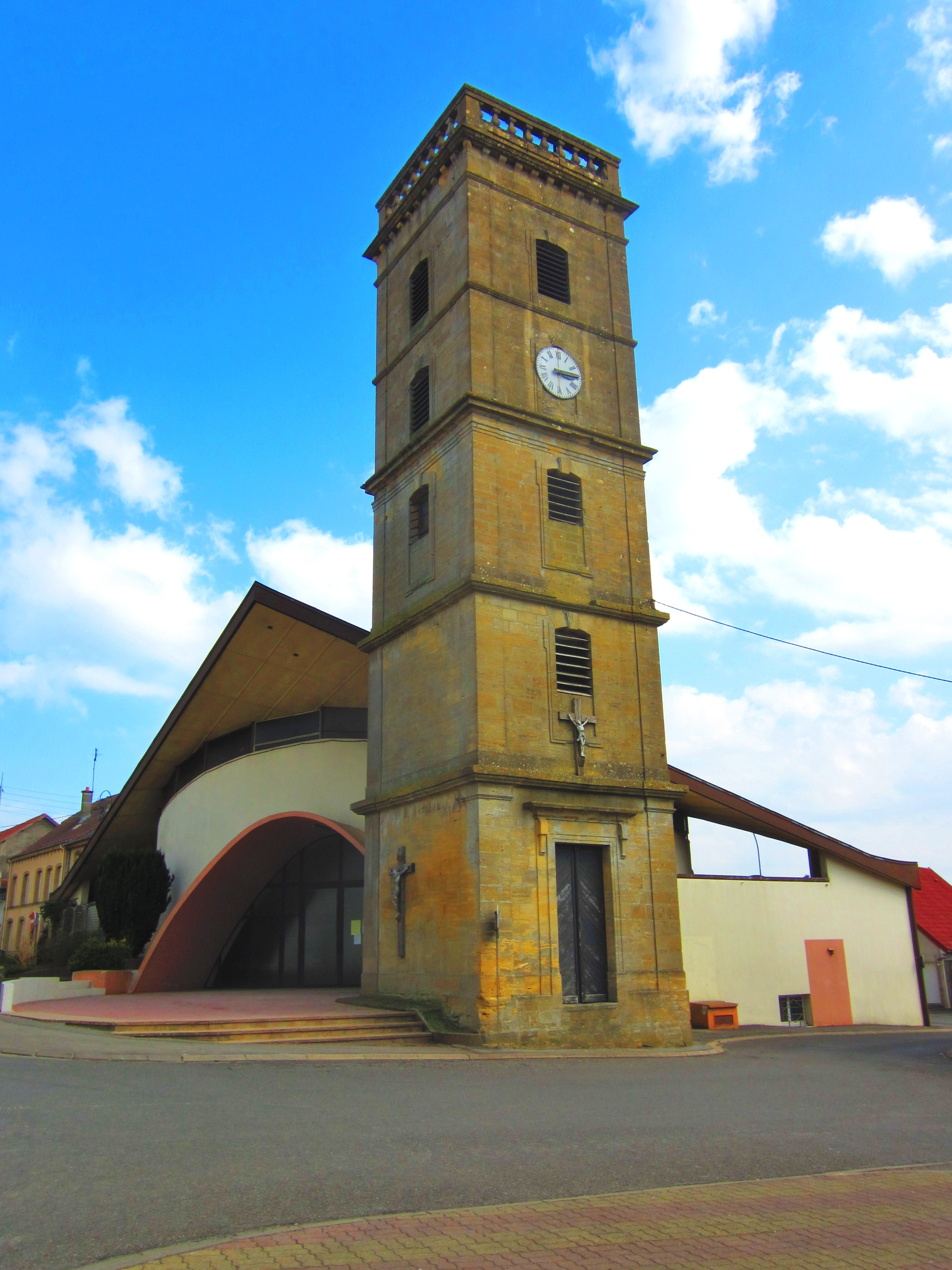
- The church in Lexy

- Coat of arms
- Location of Lexy
- Location within France Location within Grand Est
- Coordinates: 49°30′07″N 5°43′59″E
- Country: France
- Region: Grand Est
- Department: Meurthe-et-Moselle
- Arrondissement: Val-de-Briey
- Canton: Longwy
- Intercommunality: Grand Longwy Agglomération

Government
  - Mayor (2020–2026): Gérard Allieri
- Area^{1}: 5.99 km^{2} (2.31 sq mi)
- Elevation: 360 m (1,180 ft)
- Highest elevation: 380 m (1,250 ft)
- Lowest elevation: 239 m (784 ft)
- Population (2023): 3,904
  - Density: 652/km^{2} (1,690/sq mi)
- Time zone: UTC+01:00 (CET)
  - Summer (DST): UTC+02:00 (CEST)
- INSEE/Postal code: 54314 /54720
- ^{1} French Land Register data, which excludes lakes, ponds, glaciers > 1 km^{2} (0.386 sq mi or 247 acres) and river estuaries.

Lexy (French pronunciation: [lɛksi]) is a commune in the Meurthe-et-Moselle department in north-eastern France.

== Population ==
Historical population
Year	Pop.	±% p.a.
1968	2,627	—
1975	3,013	+1.98%
1982	3,377	+1.64%
1990	2,962	−1.63%
1999	2,993	+0.12%
2007	2,840	−0.65%
2012	3,249	+2.73%
2017	3,725	+2.77%
2023	3,904	+0.79%
Source: INSEE

== See also ==
- Communes of the Meurthe-et-Moselle department
