= Chenières =

- Commune
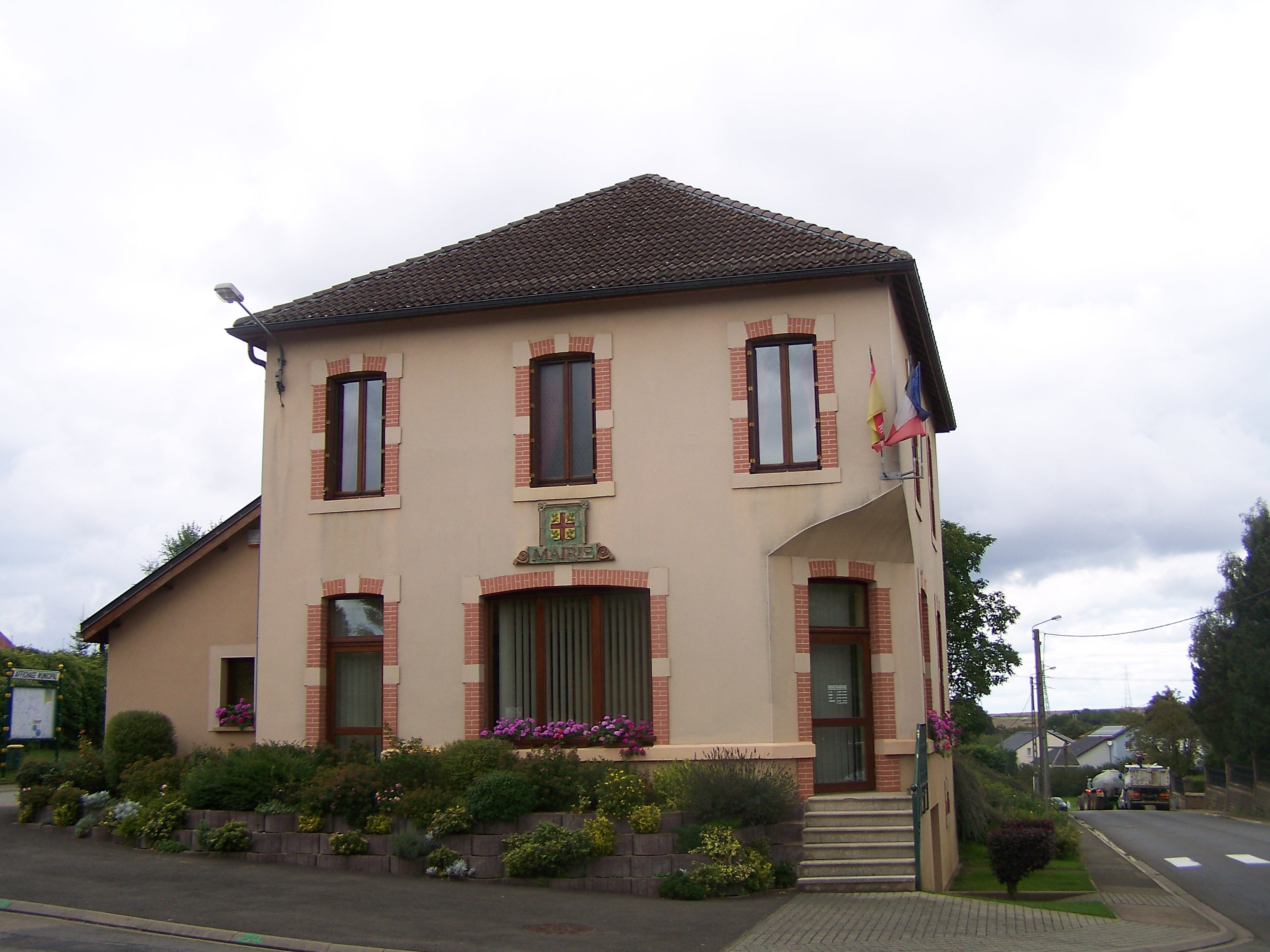
- The town hall in Chenières

- Coat of arms
- Location of Chenières
- Location within France Location within Grand Est
- Coordinates: 49°28′19″N 5°45′58″E
- Country: France
- Region: Grand Est
- Department: Meurthe-et-Moselle
- Arrondissement: Val-de-Briey
- Canton: Longwy
- Intercommunality: Grand Longwy Agglomération

Government
  - Mayor (2020–2026): Richard Raullet
- Area^{1}: 8.5 km^{2} (3.3 sq mi)
- Elevation: 310 m (1,020 ft)
- Highest elevation: 398 m (1,306 ft)
- Lowest elevation: 274 m (899 ft)
- Population (2023): 596
  - Density: 70/km^{2} (180/sq mi)
- Time zone: UTC+01:00 (CET)
  - Summer (DST): UTC+02:00 (CEST)
- INSEE/Postal code: 54127 /54720
- ^{1} French Land Register data, which excludes lakes, ponds, glaciers > 1 km^{2} (0.386 sq mi or 247 acres) and river estuaries.

Chenières (French pronunciation: [ʃənjɛʁ]) is a commune in the Meurthe-et-Moselle department in north-eastern France.

== See also ==
- Communes of the Meurthe-et-Moselle department
