= Mont-Saint-Martin, Meurthe-et-Moselle =

Mont-Saint-Martin
- Commune
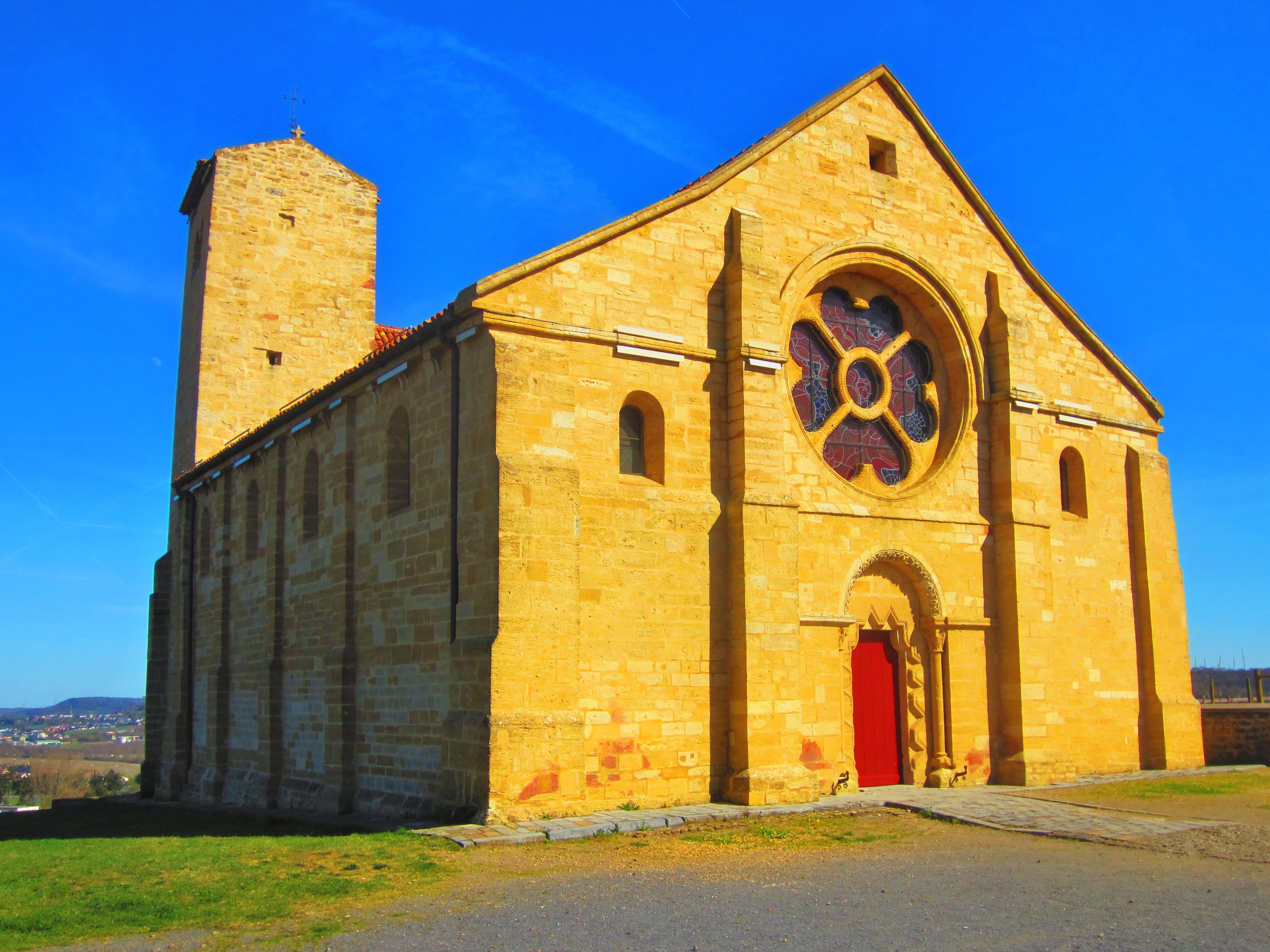
- St. Martin's Church

- Coat of arms
- Location of Mont-Saint-Martin
- Location within France Location within Grand Est
- Coordinates: 49°32′28″N 5°46′48″E
- Country: France
- Region: Grand Est
- Department: Meurthe-et-Moselle
- Arrondissement: Val-de-Briey
- Canton: Mont-Saint-Martin
- Intercommunality: Grand Longwy Agglomération

Government
  - Mayor (2020–2026): Serge De Carli
- Area^{1}: 8.84 km^{2} (3.41 sq mi)
- Elevation: 335 m (1,099 ft)
- Highest elevation: 398 m (1,306 ft)
- Lowest elevation: 260 m (850 ft)
- Population (2023): 9,361
  - Density: 1,060/km^{2} (2,740/sq mi)
- Time zone: UTC+01:00 (CET)
  - Summer (DST): UTC+02:00 (CEST)
- INSEE/Postal code: 54382 /54350
- ^{1} French Land Register data, which excludes lakes, ponds, glaciers > 1 km^{2} (0.386 sq mi or 247 acres) and river estuaries.

Mont-Saint-Martin (French pronunciation: [mɔ̃ sɛ̃ maʁtɛ̃]; German: Martinsberg; Luxembourgish: Mäertesbierg) is a commune in the Meurthe-et-Moselle department in north-eastern France. Part of the urban area of Longwy, it lies at the tripoint of France, Belgium and Luxembourg.

== Population ==
Historical population
Year	Pop.	±% p.a.
1968	10,035	—
1975	11,556	+2.04%
1982	10,419	−1.47%
1990	8,660	−2.28%
1999	8,241	−0.55%
2007	8,078	−0.25%
2012	7,936	−0.35%
2017	8,807	+2.10%
2023	9,361	+1.02%
Source: INSEE

== See also ==
- Communes of the Meurthe-et-Moselle department
