= Réhon =

- Commune
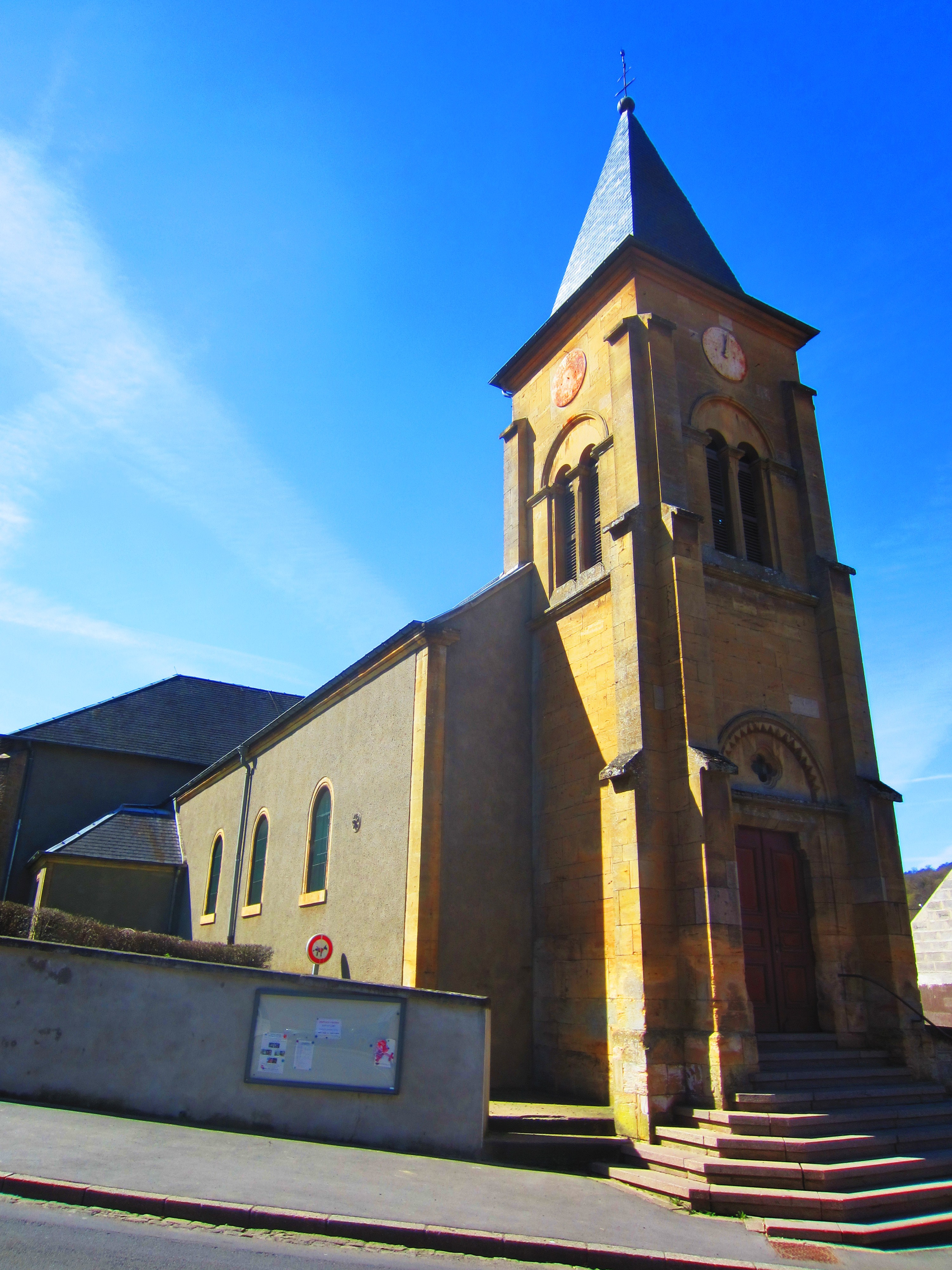
- The church in Réhon

- Coat of arms
- Location of Réhon
- Location within France Location within Grand Est
- Coordinates: 49°30′08″N 5°45′20″E
- Country: France
- Region: Grand Est
- Department: Meurthe-et-Moselle
- Arrondissement: Val-de-Briey
- Canton: Longwy
- Intercommunality: Grand Longwy Agglomération

Government
  - Mayor (2020–2026): Jean-Pierre Weber
- Area^{1}: 3.73 km^{2} (1.44 sq mi)
- Highest elevation: 371 m (1,217 ft)
- Lowest elevation: 250 m (820 ft)
- Population (2023): 3,863
  - Density: 1,040/km^{2} (2,680/sq mi)
- Time zone: UTC+01:00 (CET)
  - Summer (DST): UTC+02:00 (CEST)
- INSEE/Postal code: 54451 /54430
- ^{1} French Land Register data, which excludes lakes, ponds, glaciers > 1 km^{2} (0.386 sq mi or 247 acres) and river estuaries.

Réhon (French pronunciation: [ʁe.ɔ̃]) is a commune in the Meurthe-et-Moselle department in north-eastern France. It is the town where Jean-Marc Reiser (1941–1983) was born.

== Population ==
Historical population
Year	Pop.	±% p.a.
1968	5,174	—
1975	4,640	−1.54%
1982	3,750	−3.00%
1990	3,168	−2.09%
1999	3,200	+0.11%
2007	3,731	+1.94%
2012	3,898	+0.88%
2017	3,827	−0.37%
2023	3,863	+0.16%
Source: INSEE

== See also ==
- Communes of the Meurthe-et-Moselle department
