= Saulnes =

- Commune
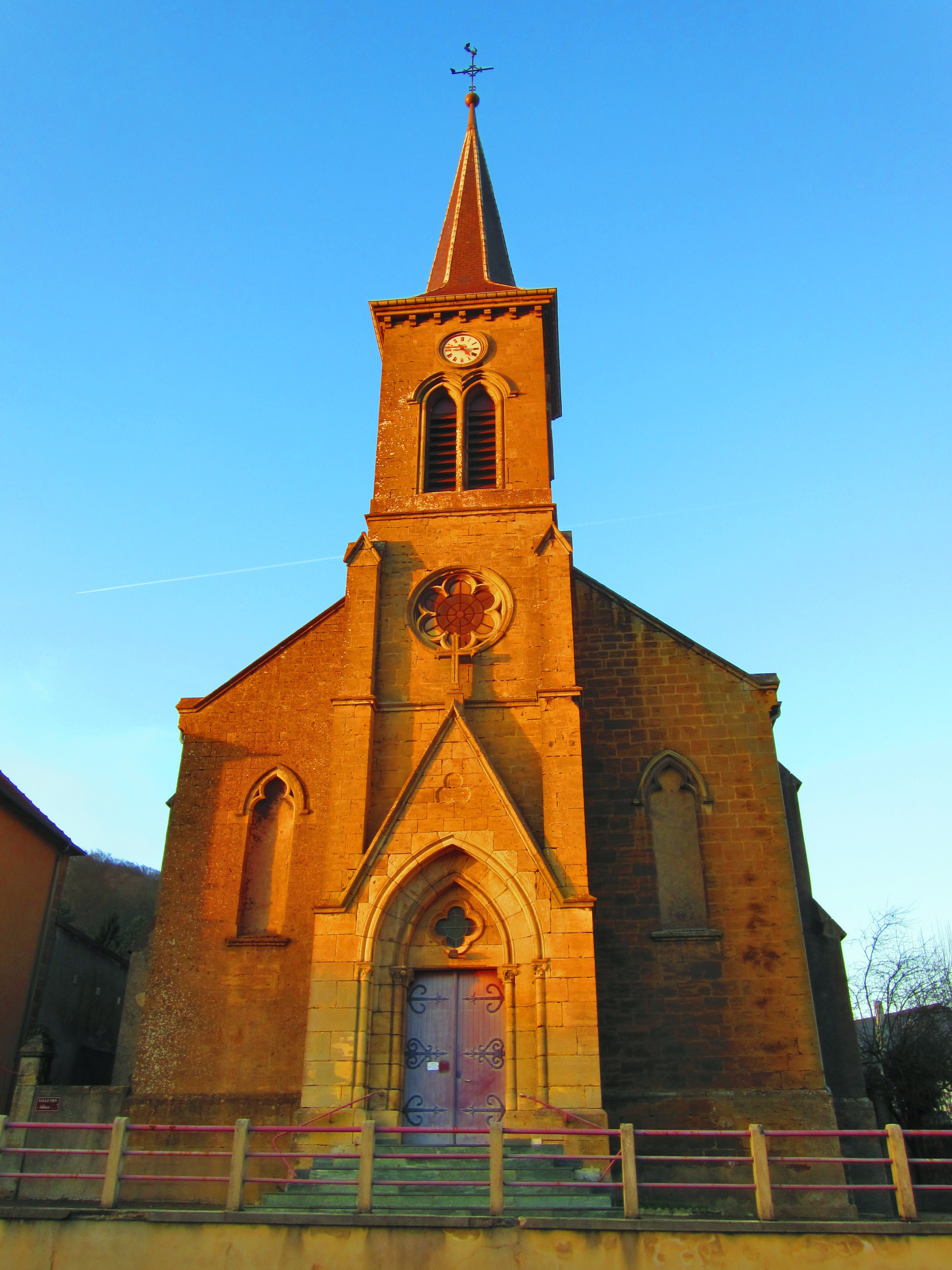
- St. John the Baptist's church

- Coat of arms
- Location of Saulnes
- Location within France Location within Grand Est
- Coordinates: 49°32′00″N 5°49′36″E
- Country: France
- Region: Grand Est
- Department: Meurthe-et-Moselle
- Arrondissement: Val-de-Briey
- Canton: Villerupt
- Intercommunality: Grand Longwy Agglomération

Government
  - Mayor (2020–2026): Adrien Zolfo
- Area^{1}: 4.0 km^{2} (1.5 sq mi)
- Elevation: 288 m (945 ft)
- Highest elevation: 398 m (1,306 ft)
- Lowest elevation: 275 m (902 ft)
- Population (2023): 2,259
  - Density: 560/km^{2} (1,500/sq mi)
- Time zone: UTC+01:00 (CET)
  - Summer (DST): UTC+02:00 (CEST)
- INSEE/Postal code: 54493 /54650
- ^{1} French Land Register data, which excludes lakes, ponds, glaciers > 1 km^{2} (0.386 sq mi or 247 acres) and river estuaries.

Saulnes (French pronunciation: [so(l)n]; Luxembourgish: Zounen/Zongen) is a commune in the Meurthe-et-Moselle department in north-eastern France.

== Population ==
Historical population
Year	Pop.	±% p.a.
1968	3,418	—
1975	2,953	−2.07%
1982	2,783	−0.84%
1990	2,473	−1.47%
1999	2,454	−0.09%
2007	2,349	−0.55%
2012	2,424	+0.63%
2017	2,413	−0.09%
2023	2,259	−1.09%
Source: INSEE

== See also ==
- Communes of the Meurthe-et-Moselle department
