= Fameck =

- Commune
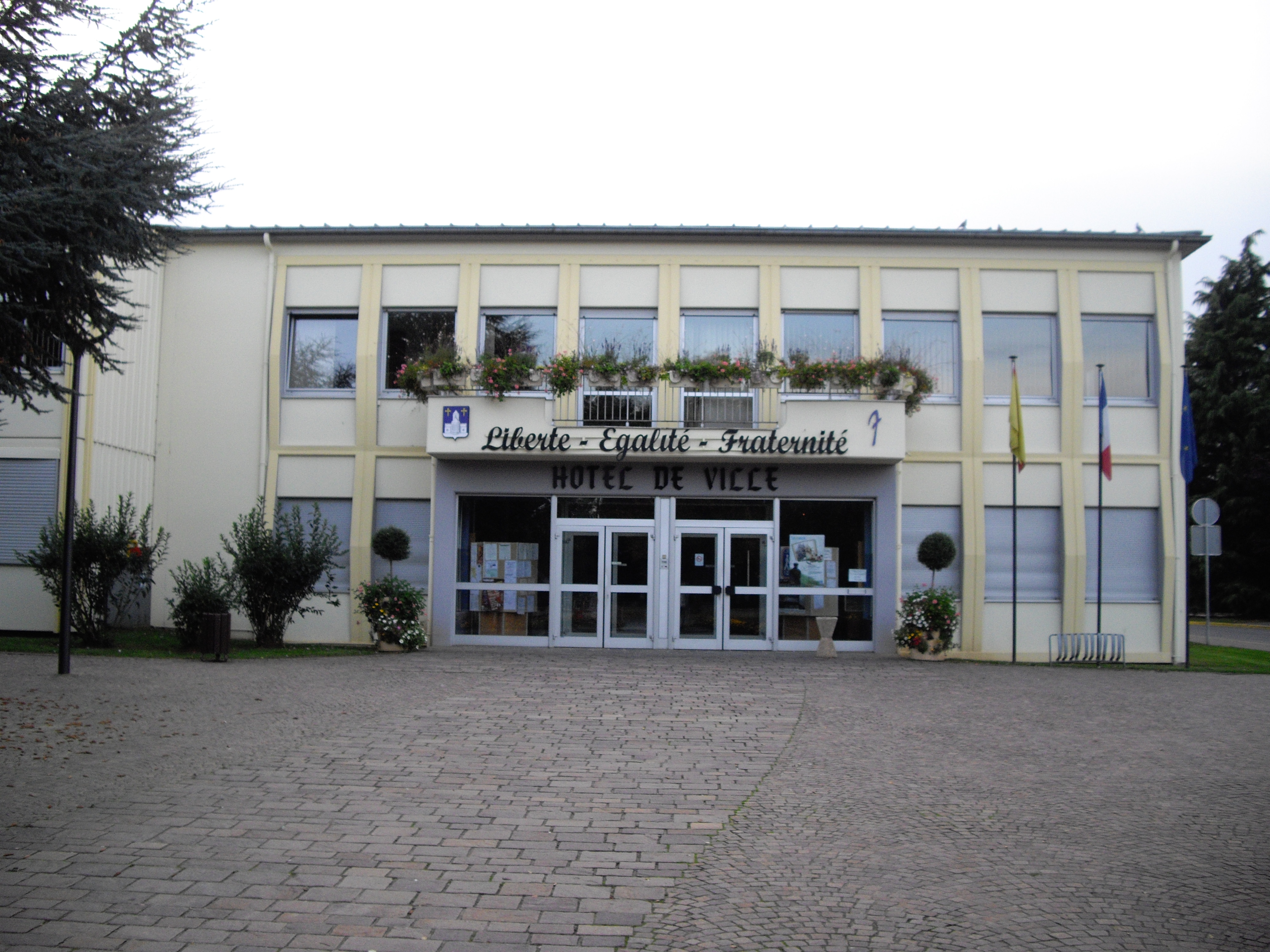
- The town hall in Fameck

- Coat of arms
- Location of Fameck
- Location within France Location within Grand Est
- Coordinates: 49°18′N 6°07′E
- Country: France
- Region: Grand Est
- Department: Moselle
- Arrondissement: Thionville
- Canton: Fameck
- Intercommunality: CA Val de Fensch

Government
  - Mayor (2020–2026): Michel Liebgott
- Area^{1}: 12.45 km^{2} (4.81 sq mi)
- Highest elevation: 363 m (1,191 ft)
- Lowest elevation: 167 m (548 ft)
- Population (2023): 14,788
  - Density: 1,188/km^{2} (3,076/sq mi)
- Demonym: Fameckois(es)
- Time zone: UTC+01:00 (CET)
  - Summer (DST): UTC+02:00 (CEST)
- INSEE/Postal code: 57206 /57290
- ^{1} French Land Register data, which excludes lakes, ponds, glaciers > 1 km^{2} (0.386 sq mi or 247 acres) and river estuaries.

Fameck (French pronunciation: [famɛk]; German: Fameck) is a commune in the Moselle department in Grand Est in north-eastern France.

Localities of the commune: Budange (a.k.a. Budange sous Justemont) and in German: Büdingen unter Justberg, Edange (German: Edingen), Morlange (German: Morlingen), Rémelange (German: Remelingen).

== Population ==
Historical population

Year	Pop.	±% p.a.
1793	305	—
1821	1,011	+4.37%
1841	1,268	+1.14%
1871	1,109	−0.45%
1900	1,206	+0.29%
1926	1,514	+0.88%
1946	2,961	+3.41%
1954	4,543	+5.50%
1962	7,571	+6.59%

Year	Pop.	±% p.a.
1968	14,034	+10.83%
1975	17,755	+3.42%
1982	14,942	−2.43%
1990	13,922	−0.88%
1999	12,635	−1.07%
2007	12,468	−0.17%
2012	13,656	+1.84%
2017	13,931	+0.40%
2023	14,788	+1.00%

Source: EHESS and INSEE (1968-2023)

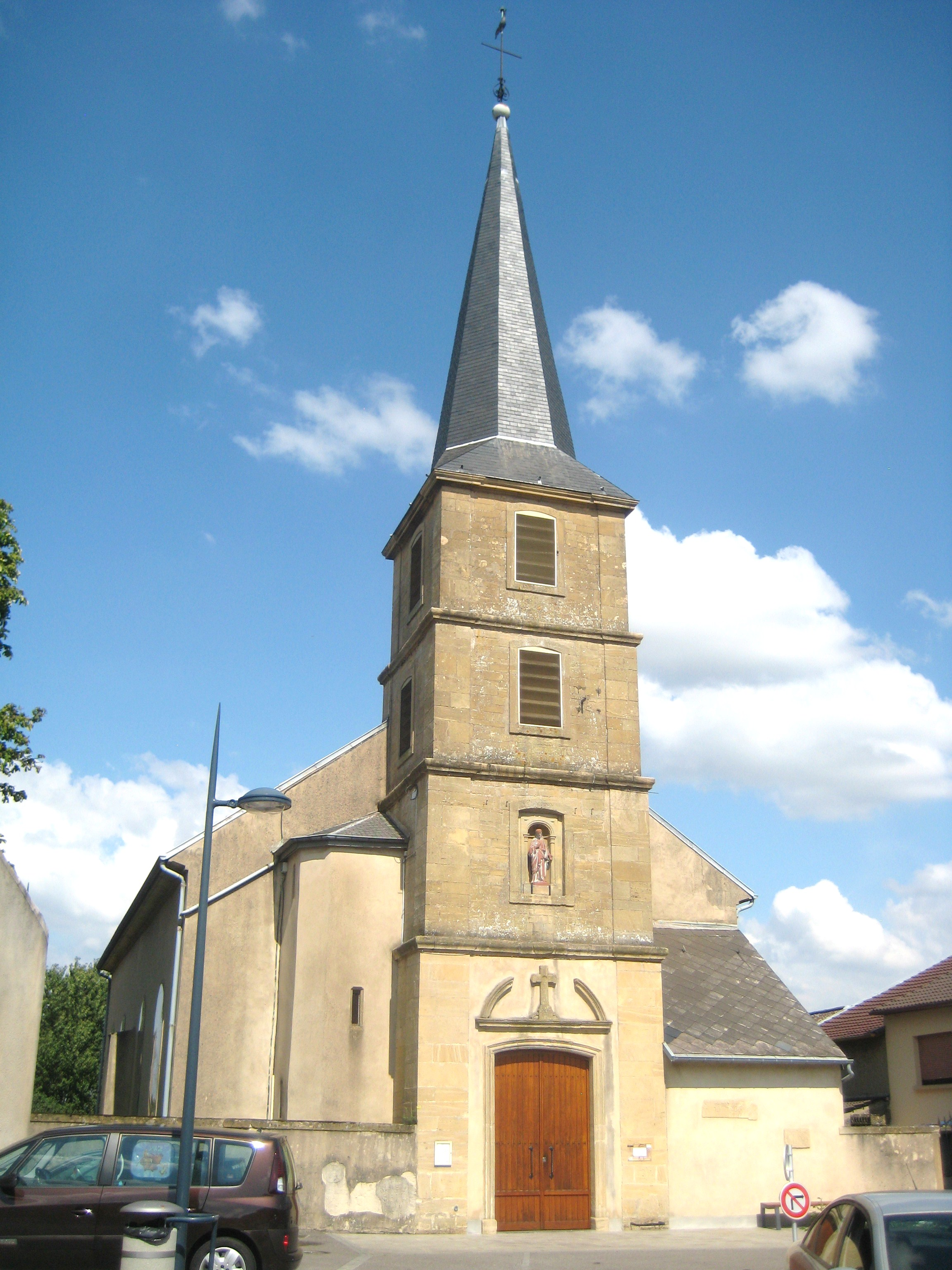
Saint-Martin church

== See also ==
- Communes of the Moselle department
