= Bréhain-la-Ville =

- Commune
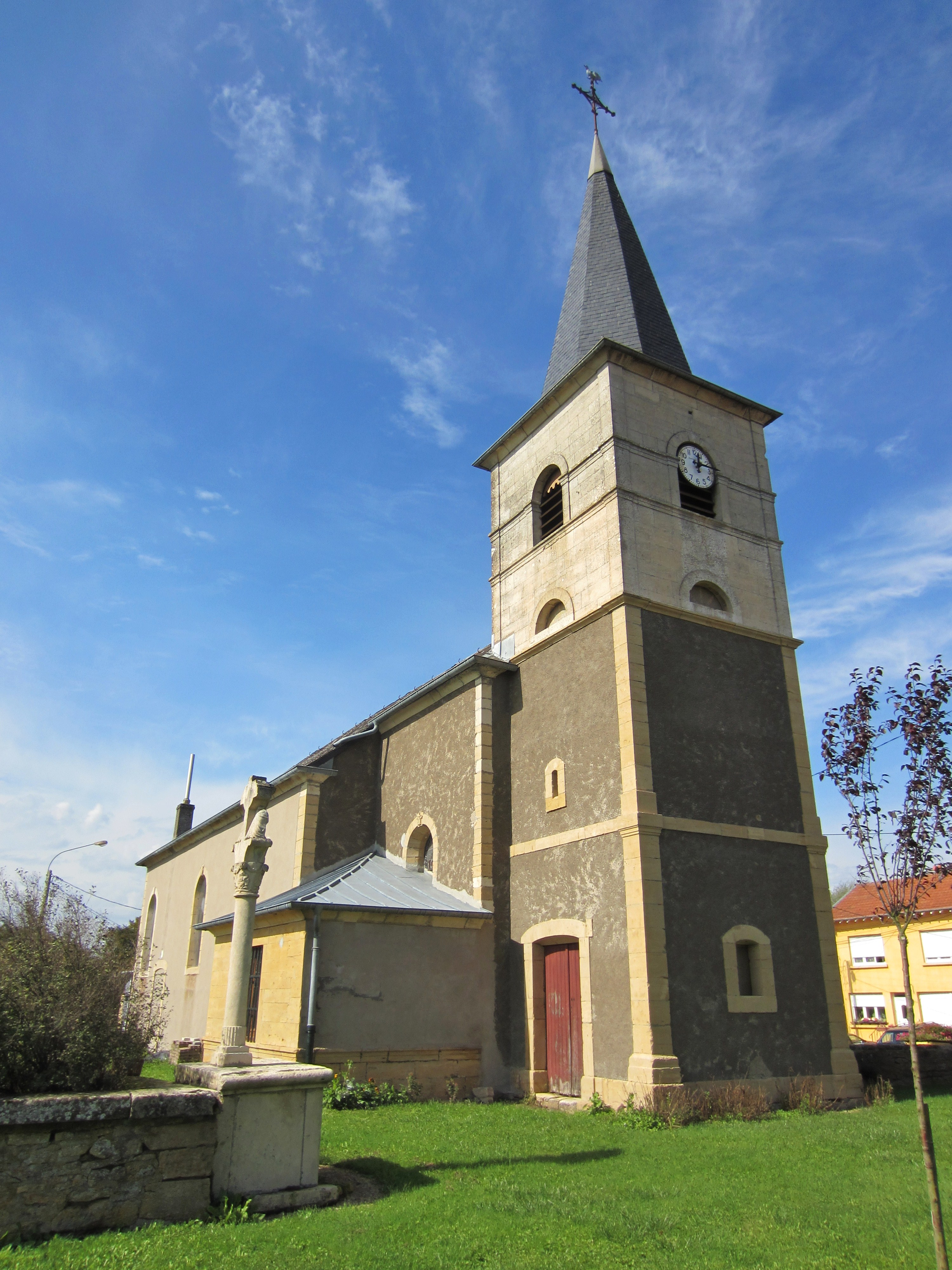
- The church in Bréhain-la-Ville

- Coat of arms
- Location of Bréhain-la-Ville
- Location within France Location within Grand Est
- Coordinates: 49°26′18″N 5°52′56″E
- Country: France
- Region: Grand Est
- Department: Meurthe-et-Moselle
- Arrondissement: Val-de-Briey
- Canton: Villerupt

Government
  - Mayor (2020–2026): Bernardino Pallotta
- Area^{1}: 10.08 km^{2} (3.89 sq mi)
- Elevation: 443 m (1,453 ft)
- Highest elevation: 441 m (1,447 ft)
- Lowest elevation: 339 m (1,112 ft)
- Population (2023): 463
  - Density: 45.9/km^{2} (119/sq mi)
- Time zone: UTC+01:00 (CET)
  - Summer (DST): UTC+02:00 (CEST)
- INSEE/Postal code: 54096 /54190
- ^{1} French Land Register data, which excludes lakes, ponds, glaciers > 1 km^{2} (0.386 sq mi or 247 acres) and river estuaries.

Bréhain-la-Ville (Luxembourgish: Leit-Bierchem) is a commune in the Meurthe-et-Moselle department in northeastern France.
Bréhain-la-Ville includes the hamlet named Bréhain-la-Cour.

== Population ==
Historical population
Year	Pop.	±% p.a.
1968	225	—
1975	223	−0.13%
1982	175	−3.40%
1990	183	+0.56%
1999	227	+2.42%
2007	260	+1.71%
2012	309	+3.51%
2017	412	+5.92%
2023	463	+1.96%
Source: INSEE

== See also ==
- Communes of the Meurthe-et-Moselle department
