= Cutry, Meurthe-et-Moselle =

Cutry
- Commune
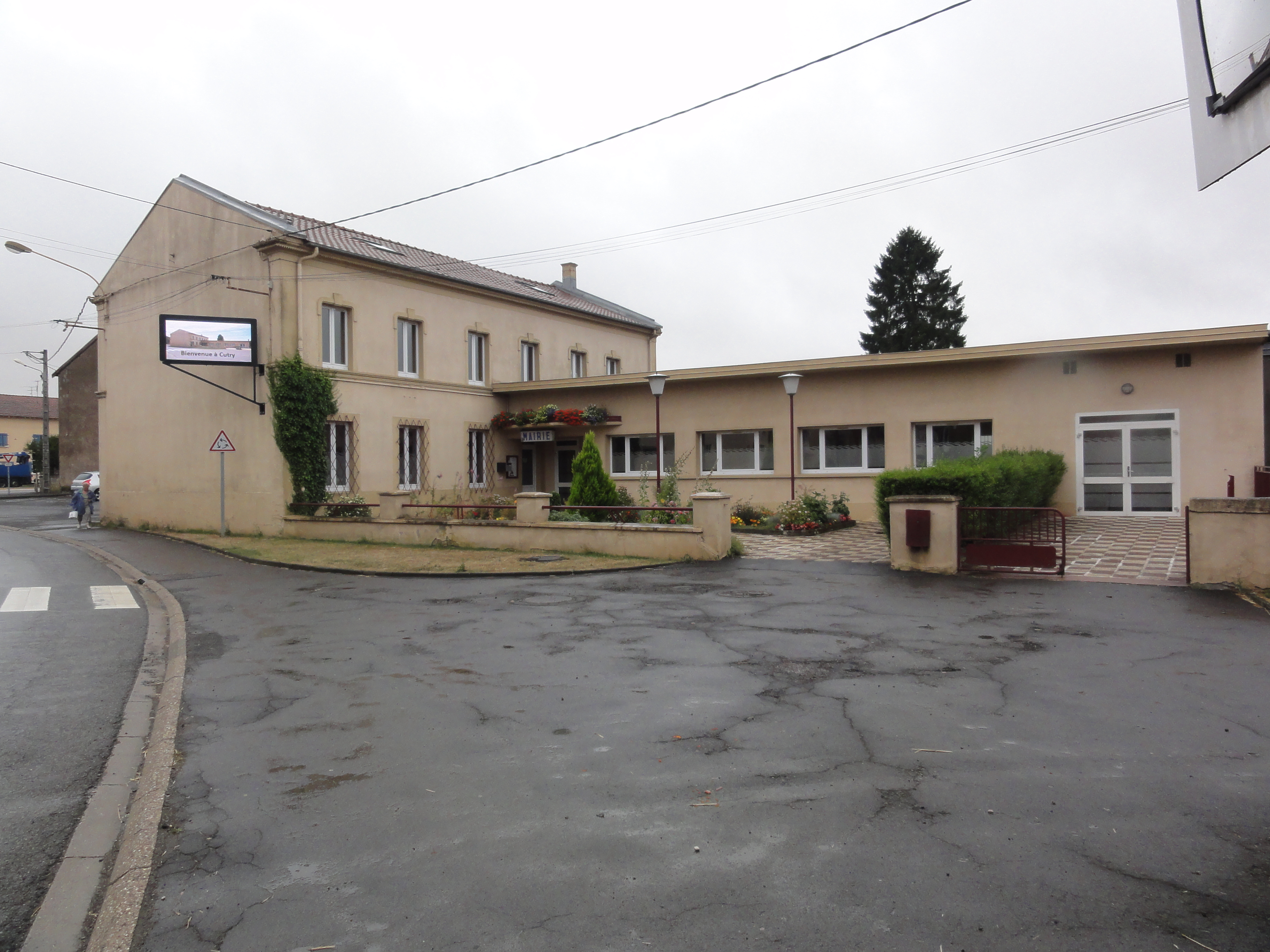
- The town hall in Cutry

- Coat of arms
- Location of Cutry
- Location within France Location within Grand Est
- Coordinates: 49°29′04″N 5°44′33″E
- Country: France
- Region: Grand Est
- Department: Meurthe-et-Moselle
- Arrondissement: Val-de-Briey
- Canton: Longwy
- Intercommunality: Grand Longwy Agglomération

Government
  - Mayor (2020–2026): Jean Huard
- Area^{1}: 5.97 km^{2} (2.31 sq mi)
- Elevation: 342 m (1,122 ft)
- Highest elevation: 393 m (1,289 ft)
- Lowest elevation: 242 m (794 ft)
- Population (2023): 1,032
  - Density: 173/km^{2} (448/sq mi)
- Time zone: UTC+01:00 (CET)
  - Summer (DST): UTC+02:00 (CEST)
- INSEE/Postal code: 54151 /54720
- ^{1} French Land Register data, which excludes lakes, ponds, glaciers > 1 km^{2} (0.386 sq mi or 247 acres) and river estuaries.

Cutry (French pronunciation: [kytʁi]) is a commune in the Meurthe-et-Moselle department in north-eastern France.

== See also ==
- Communes of the Meurthe-et-Moselle department
