= Thil, Meurthe-et-Moselle =

Thil
- Commune
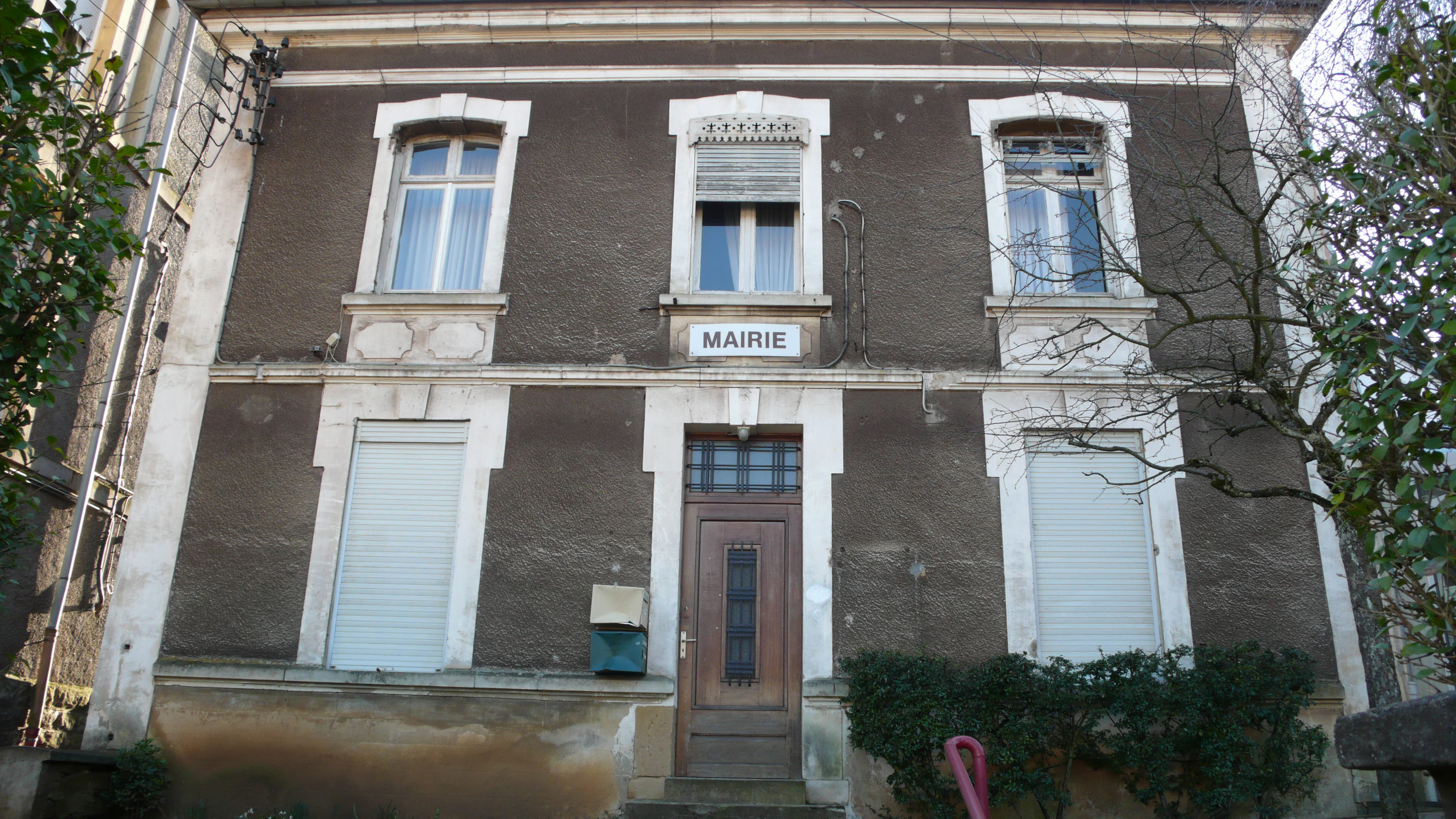
- The town hall in Thil

- Coat of arms
- Location of Thil
- Location within France Location within Grand Est
- Coordinates: 49°28′26″N 5°54′33″E
- Country: France
- Region: Grand Est
- Department: Meurthe-et-Moselle
- Arrondissement: Val-de-Briey
- Canton: Villerupt
- Intercommunality: Pays Haut Val d'Alzette

Government
  - Mayor (2020–2026): Stéphan Brusco
- Area^{1}: 3.32 km^{2} (1.28 sq mi)
- Elevation: 343 m (1,125 ft)
- Highest elevation: 431 m (1,414 ft)
- Lowest elevation: 340 m (1,120 ft)
- Population (2023): 2,016
  - Density: 607/km^{2} (1,570/sq mi)
- Time zone: UTC+01:00 (CET)
  - Summer (DST): UTC+02:00 (CEST)
- INSEE/Postal code: 54521 /54880
- ^{1} French Land Register data, which excludes lakes, ponds, glaciers > 1 km^{2} (0.386 sq mi or 247 acres) and river estuaries.

Thil (French pronunciation: [til]) is a commune in the Meurthe-et-Moselle department in north-eastern France.

== Population ==
Historical population
Year	Pop.	±% p.a.
1968	2,760	—
1975	2,272	−2.74%
1982	1,904	−2.49%
1990	1,742	−1.11%
1999	1,575	−1.11%
2007	1,619	+0.35%
2012	1,609	−0.12%
2017	1,877	+3.13%
2023	2,016	+1.20%
Source: INSEE

== See also ==
- Communes of the Meurthe-et-Moselle department
