= Richemont, Moselle =

Richemont
- Commune
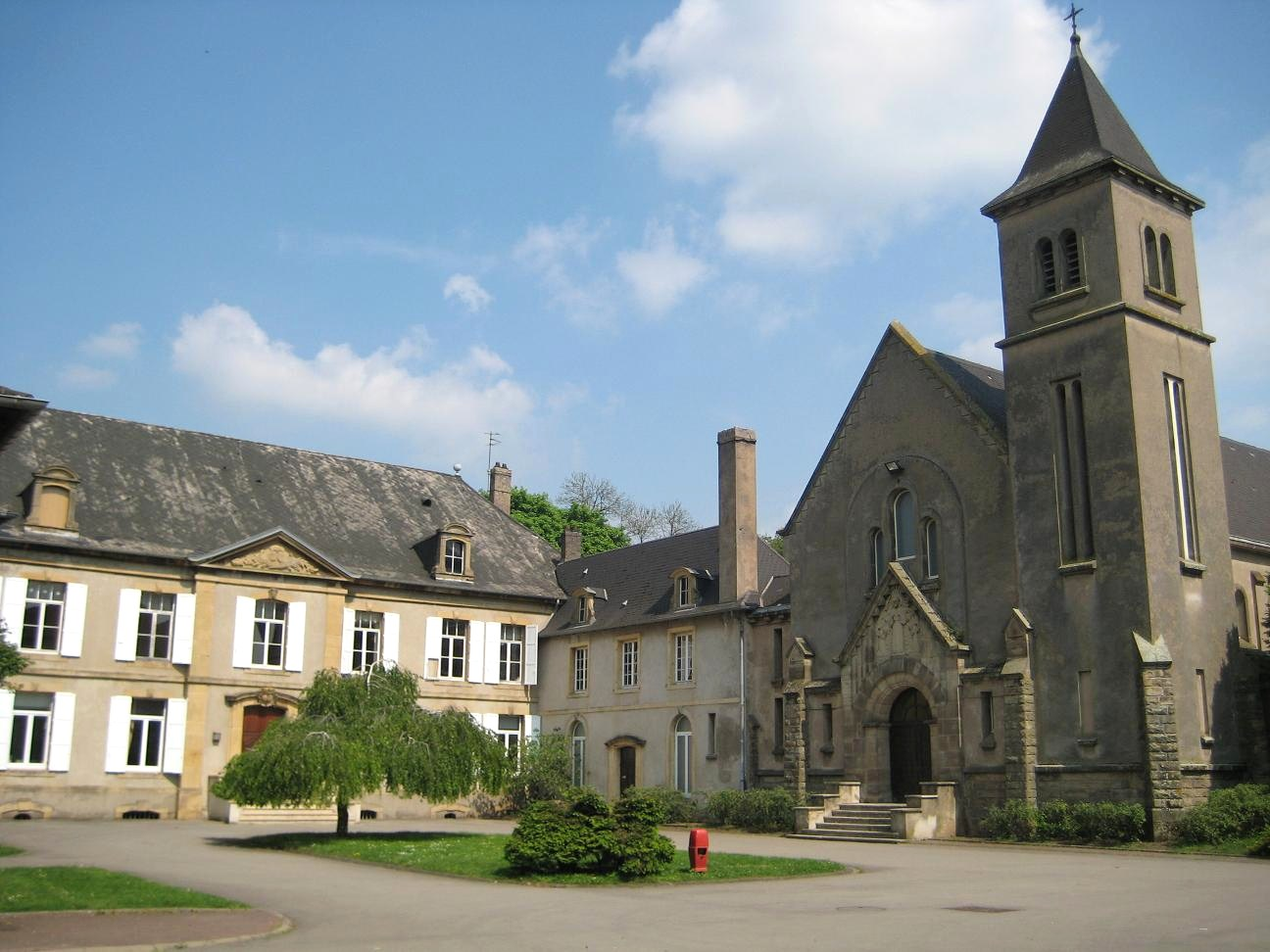
- Pépinville castle.

- Coat of arms
- Location of Richemont
- Location within France Location within Grand Est
- Coordinates: 49°16′46″N 6°10′01″E
- Country: France
- Region: Grand Est
- Department: Moselle
- Arrondissement: Thionville
- Canton: Fameck
- Intercommunality: CC Rives de Moselle

Government
  - Mayor (2020–2026): Jean-Luc Queuniez
- Area^{1}: 8.48 km^{2} (3.27 sq mi)
- Elevation: 234 m (768 ft)
- Highest elevation: 214 m (702 ft)
- Lowest elevation: 152 m (499 ft)
- Population (2023): 2,175
  - Density: 256/km^{2} (664/sq mi)
- Time zone: UTC+01:00 (CET)
  - Summer (DST): UTC+02:00 (CEST)
- INSEE/Postal code: 57582 /57270
- ^{1} French Land Register data, which excludes lakes, ponds, glaciers > 1 km^{2} (0.386 sq mi or 247 acres) and river estuaries.

Richemont (French: [ʁiʃmɔ̃]; outdated German: Reichersberg [ˈʁaɪçɐsˌbɛʁk]) is a commune in the Moselle department in Grand Est, France. The localities of the commune are Bévange and Pépinville (German: Pepinsdorf).

== Population ==
Historical population
Year	Pop.	±% p.a.
1968	3,010	—
1975	2,095	−5.05%
1982	1,776	−2.33%
1990	1,769	−0.05%
1999	1,879	+0.67%
2007	1,867	−0.08%
2012	1,863	−0.04%
2017	2,075	+2.18%
2023	2,175	+0.79%
Source: INSEE

== See also ==
- Communes of the Moselle department
