= Cosnes-et-Romain =

- Commune
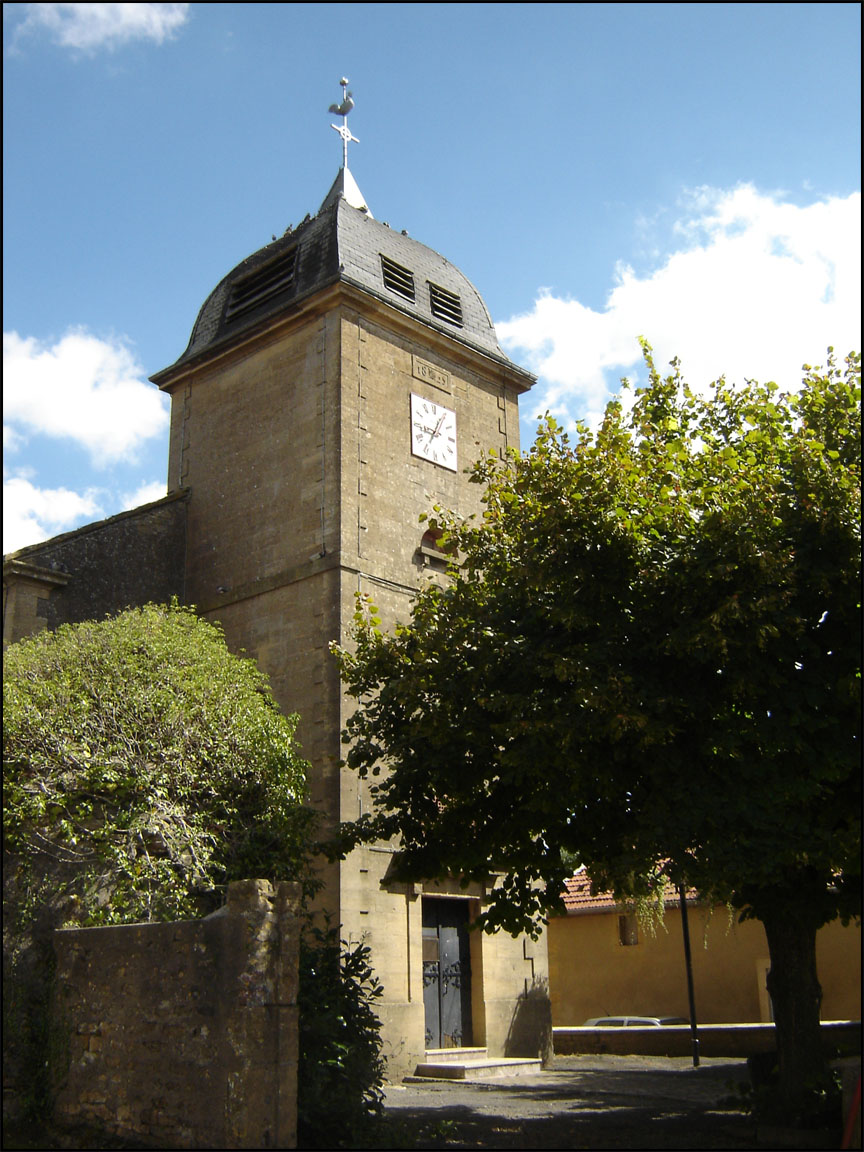
- St. Martin's church in Cosnes

- Coat of arms
- Location of Cosnes-et-Romain
- Location within France Location within Grand Est
- Coordinates: 49°31′12″N 5°42′43″E
- Country: France
- Region: Grand Est
- Department: Meurthe-et-Moselle
- Arrondissement: Val-de-Briey
- Canton: Mont-Saint-Martin
- Intercommunality: Grand Longwy Agglomération

Government
  - Mayor (2020–2026): Cédric Aceti
- Area^{1}: 16.23 km^{2} (6.27 sq mi)
- Elevation: 390 m (1,280 ft)
- Highest elevation: 400 m (1,300 ft)
- Lowest elevation: 262 m (860 ft)
- Population (2023): 2,802
  - Density: 172.6/km^{2} (447.1/sq mi)
- Time zone: UTC+01:00 (CET)
  - Summer (DST): UTC+02:00 (CEST)
- INSEE/Postal code: 54138 /54400
- ^{1} French Land Register data, which excludes lakes, ponds, glaciers > 1 km^{2} (0.386 sq mi or 247 acres) and river estuaries.

Cosnes-et-Romain (French pronunciation: [kon e ʁɔmɛ̃], lit. 'Cosnes and Romain') is a commune in the Meurthe-et-Moselle department in north-eastern France.

== Population ==
Historical population
Year	Pop.	±% p.a.
1968	1,417	—
1975	1,542	+1.22%
1982	1,859	+2.71%
1990	2,053	+1.25%
1999	2,089	+0.19%
2007	2,211	+0.71%
2012	2,645	+3.65%
2017	2,690	+0.34%
2023	2,802	+0.68%
Source: INSEE

== See also ==
- Communes of the Meurthe-et-Moselle department
