= Crusnes =

- Commune
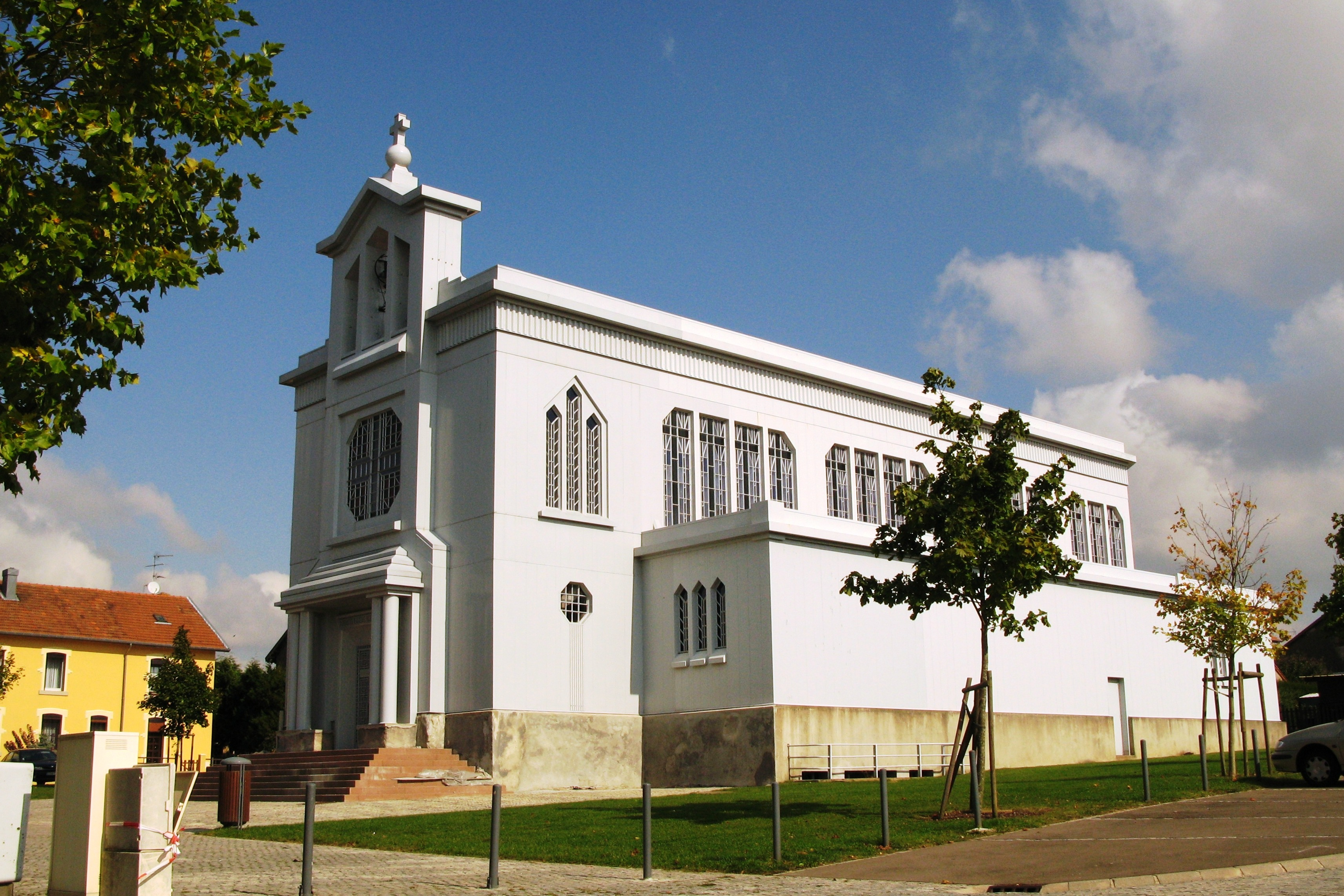
- Eglise Sainte-Barbe

- Coat of arms
- Location of Crusnes
- Location within France Location within Grand Est
- Coordinates: 49°26′07″N 5°55′02″E
- Country: France
- Region: Grand Est
- Department: Meurthe-et-Moselle
- Arrondissement: Val-de-Briey
- Canton: Villerupt
- Intercommunality: Cœur du Pays-Haut

Government
  - Mayor (2020–2026): Florent Bertelle
- Area^{1}: 6.06 km^{2} (2.34 sq mi)
- Elevation: 371 m (1,217 ft)
- Highest elevation: 436 m (1,430 ft)
- Lowest elevation: 350 m (1,150 ft)
- Population (2023): 1,559
  - Density: 257/km^{2} (666/sq mi)
- Time zone: UTC+01:00 (CET)
  - Summer (DST): UTC+02:00 (CEST)
- INSEE/Postal code: 54149 /54680
- ^{1} French Land Register data, which excludes lakes, ponds, glaciers > 1 km^{2} (0.386 sq mi or 247 acres) and river estuaries.

Crusnes (French pronunciation: [kʁyn]; Luxembourgish: Krongen) is a commune in the Meurthe-et-Moselle department in north-eastern France.

== See also ==
- Communes of the Meurthe-et-Moselle department
