= Canton of Longwy =

Canton in Grand Est, France

Coordinates: 49.52°N 5.76°E

The canton of Longwy is an administrative division of the Meurthe-et-Moselle department, northeastern France. Its borders were modified at the French canton reorganisation which came into effect in March 2015. Its seat is in Longwy.

It consists of the following communes:

1. Chenières
2. Cutry
3. Haucourt-Moulaine
4. Herserange
5. Lexy
6. Longwy
7. Mexy
8. Réhon
