= Tiercelet =

- Commune
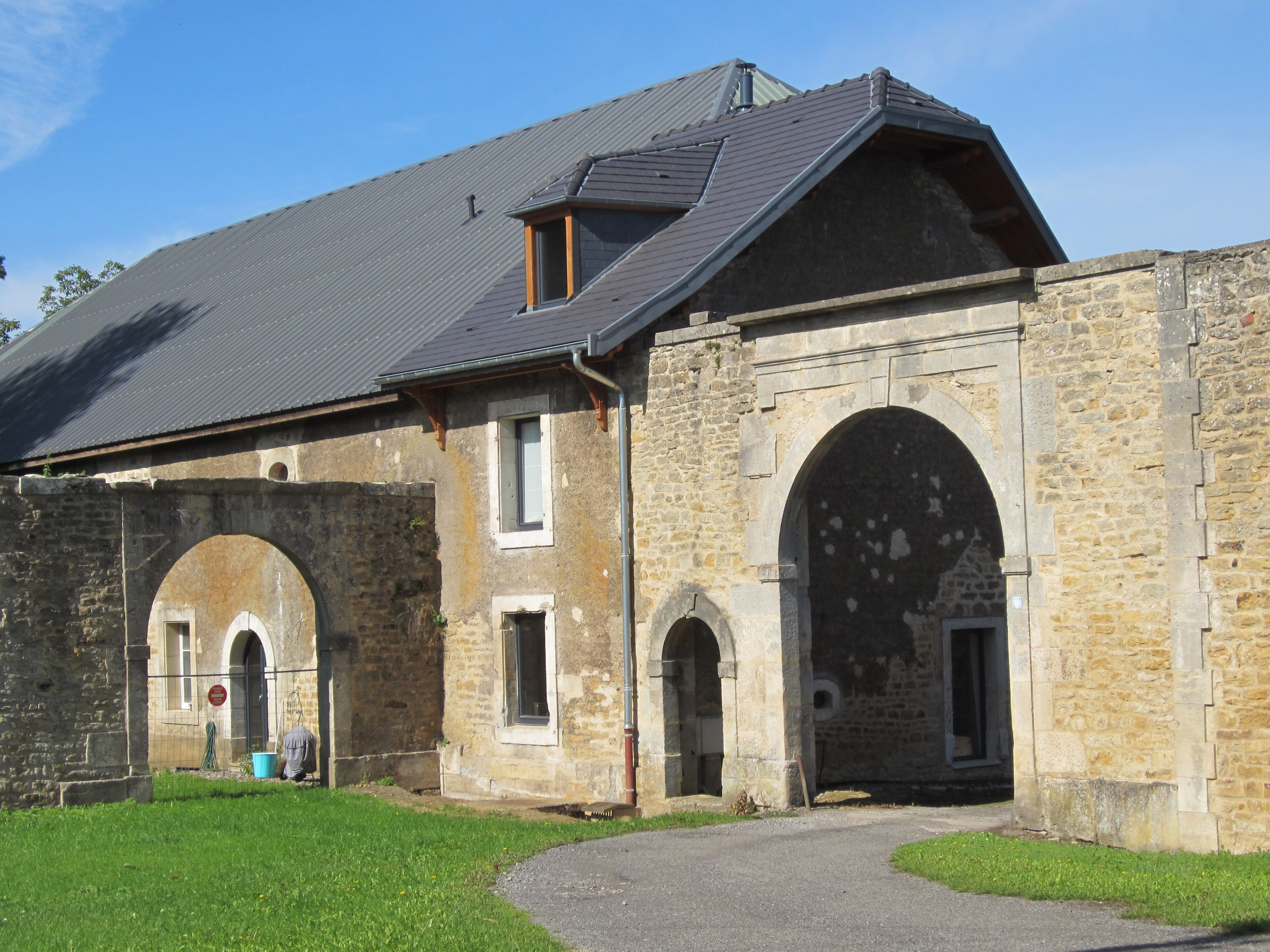
- Castle entrance

- Coat of arms
- Location of Tiercelet
- Location within France Location within Grand Est
- Coordinates: 49°27′45″N 5°53′06″E
- Country: France
- Region: Grand Est
- Department: Meurthe-et-Moselle
- Arrondissement: Val-de-Briey
- Canton: Villerupt
- Intercommunality: Grand Longwy Agglomération

Government
  - Mayor (2020–2026): Frédéric Karleskind
- Area^{1}: 7.68 km^{2} (2.97 sq mi)
- Elevation: 409 m (1,342 ft)
- Highest elevation: 432 m (1,417 ft)
- Lowest elevation: 360 m (1,180 ft)
- Population (2023): 633
  - Density: 82.4/km^{2} (213/sq mi)
- Time zone: UTC+01:00 (CET)
  - Summer (DST): UTC+02:00 (CEST)
- INSEE/Postal code: 54525 /54190
- ^{1} French Land Register data, which excludes lakes, ponds, glaciers > 1 km^{2} (0.386 sq mi or 247 acres) and river estuaries.

Tiercelet (French pronunciation: [tjɛʁsəlɛ]; Luxembourgish: Däitsch-Lahr and Lahr) is a commune in the Meurthe-et-Moselle department in north-eastern France.

== See also ==
- Communes of the Meurthe-et-Moselle department
