= Villers-la-Montagne =

- Commune
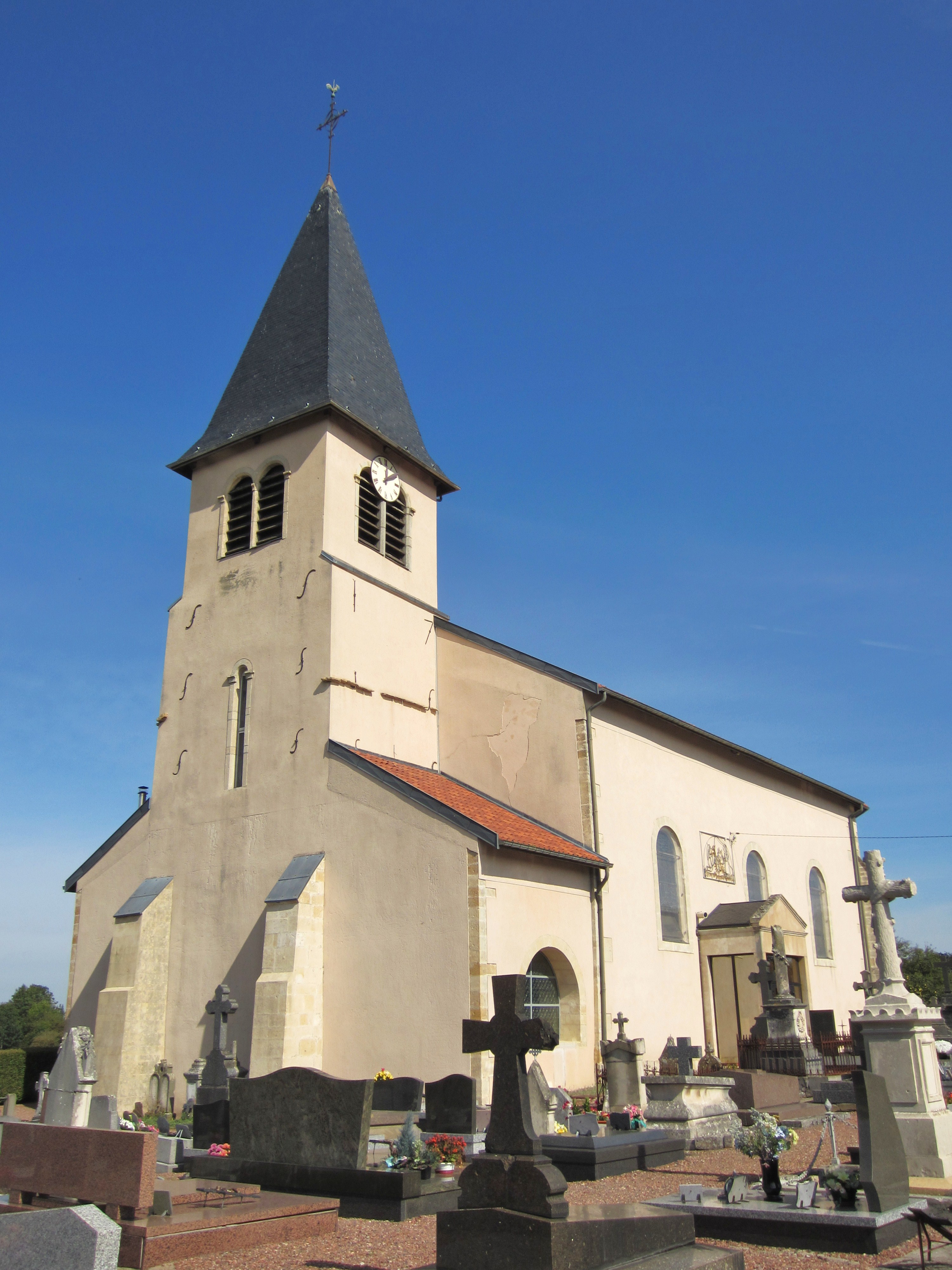
- The church in Villers-la-Montagne

- Coat of arms
- Location of Villers-la-Montagne
- Location within France Location within Grand Est
- Coordinates: 49°28′17″N 5°49′20″E
- Country: France
- Region: Grand Est
- Department: Meurthe-et-Moselle
- Arrondissement: Val-de-Briey
- Canton: Villerupt
- Intercommunality: Grand Longwy Agglomération

Government
  - Mayor (2020–2026): Guy Michel
- Area^{1}: 18.12 km^{2} (7.00 sq mi)
- Elevation: 397 m (1,302 ft)
- Highest elevation: 423 m (1,388 ft)
- Lowest elevation: 295 m (968 ft)
- Population (2023): 1,570
  - Density: 86.6/km^{2} (224/sq mi)
- Time zone: UTC+01:00 (CET)
  - Summer (DST): UTC+02:00 (CEST)
- INSEE/Postal code: 54575 /54920
- ^{1} French Land Register data, which excludes lakes, ponds, glaciers > 1 km^{2} (0.386 sq mi or 247 acres) and river estuaries.

Villers-la-Montagne (French pronunciation: [vilɛʁ la mɔ̃taɲ]; Luxembourgish: Biergweller) is a commune in the Meurthe-et-Moselle department in north-eastern France.

== See also ==
- Communes of the Meurthe-et-Moselle department
