= Fillières =

- Commune
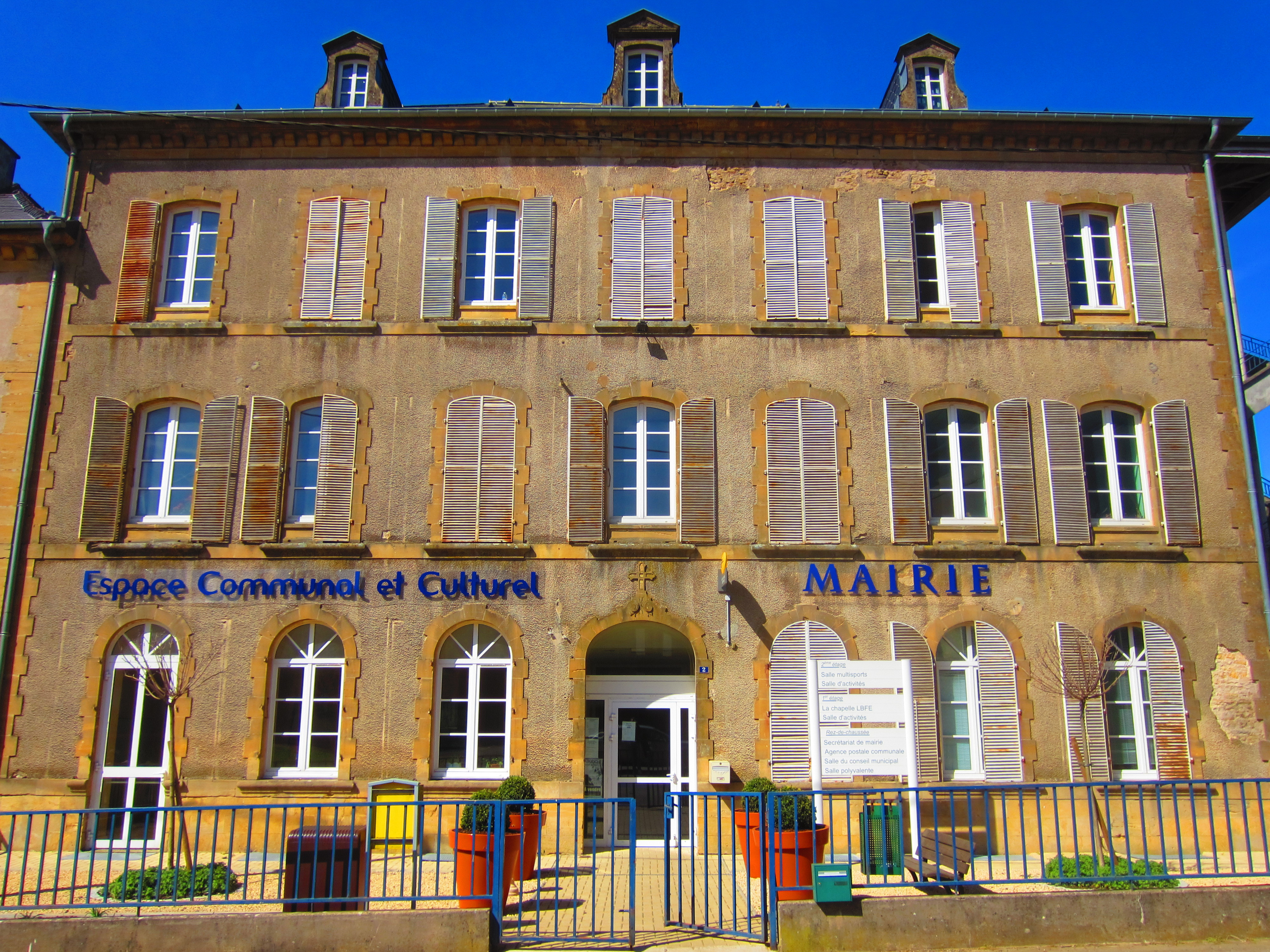
- The town hall in Fillières
- Location of Fillières
- Location within France Location within Grand Est
- Coordinates: 49°24′15″N 5°50′39″E
- Country: France
- Region: Grand Est
- Department: Meurthe-et-Moselle
- Arrondissement: Val-de-Briey
- Canton: Villerupt
- Intercommunality: Grand Longwy Agglomération

Government
  - Mayor (2020–2026): Francis Herbays
- Area^{1}: 14.21 km^{2} (5.49 sq mi)
- Elevation: 360 m (1,180 ft)
- Highest elevation: 410 m (1,350 ft)
- Lowest elevation: 265 m (869 ft)
- Population (2023): 531
  - Density: 37.4/km^{2} (96.8/sq mi)
- Time zone: UTC+01:00 (CET)
  - Summer (DST): UTC+02:00 (CEST)
- INSEE/Postal code: 54194 /54560
- ^{1} French Land Register data, which excludes lakes, ponds, glaciers > 1 km^{2} (0.386 sq mi or 247 acres) and river estuaries.

Fillières is a commune in the Meurthe-et-Moselle department in north-eastern France.

== See also ==
- Communes of the Meurthe-et-Moselle department
