= Herserange =

- Commune
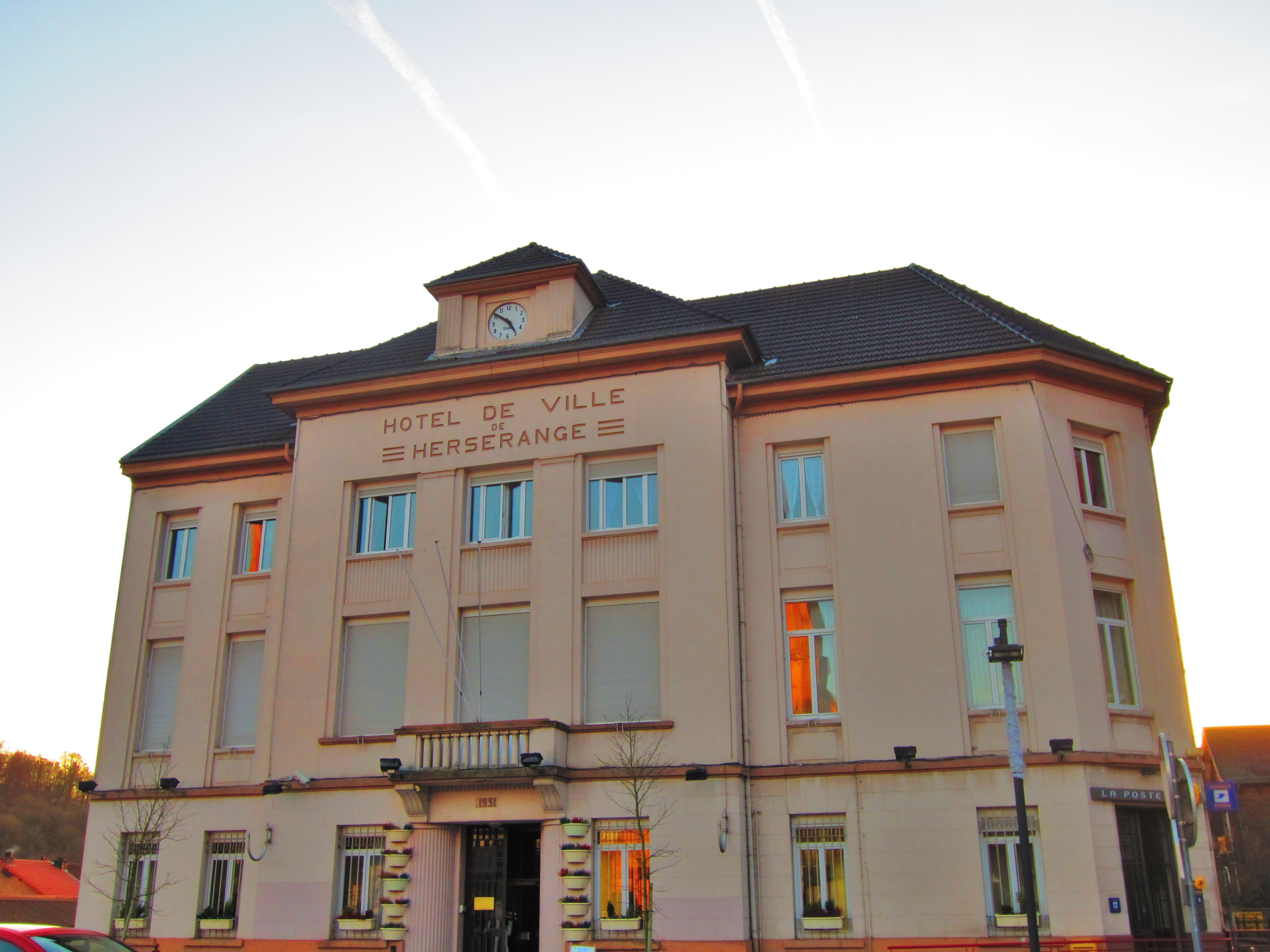
- The town hall in Herserange

- Coat of arms
- Location of Herserange
- Location within France Location within Grand Est
- Coordinates: 49°31′08″N 5°47′06″E
- Country: France
- Region: Grand Est
- Department: Meurthe-et-Moselle
- Arrondissement: Val-de-Briey
- Canton: Longwy
- Intercommunality: Grand Longwy Agglomération

Government
  - Mayor (2020–2026): Gérard Didelot
- Area^{1}: 3.54 km^{2} (1.37 sq mi)
- Elevation: 283 m (928 ft)
- Highest elevation: 445 m (1,460 ft)
- Lowest elevation: 258 m (846 ft)
- Population (2023): 4,170
  - Density: 1,180/km^{2} (3,050/sq mi)
- Time zone: UTC+01:00 (CET)
  - Summer (DST): UTC+02:00 (CEST)
- INSEE/Postal code: 54261 /54440
- ^{1} French Land Register data, which excludes lakes, ponds, glaciers > 1 km^{2} (0.386 sq mi or 247 acres) and river estuaries.

Herserange (French pronunciation: [ɛʁsəʁɑ̃ʒ]; German: Herseringen, Luxembourgish: Hiirkeréng/Hierkeréng) is a commune in the Meurthe-et-Moselle department in north-eastern France. It is part of the urban area of Longwy.

== Population ==
Historical population
Year	Pop.	±% p.a.
1968	7,044	—
1975	6,626	−0.87%
1982	4,918	−4.17%
1990	4,240	−1.84%
1999	4,327	+0.23%
2007	4,465	+0.39%
2012	4,391	−0.33%
2017	4,390	−0.00%
2023	4,170	−0.85%
Source: INSEE

== See also ==
- Communes of the Meurthe-et-Moselle department
