= Longlaville =

- Commune
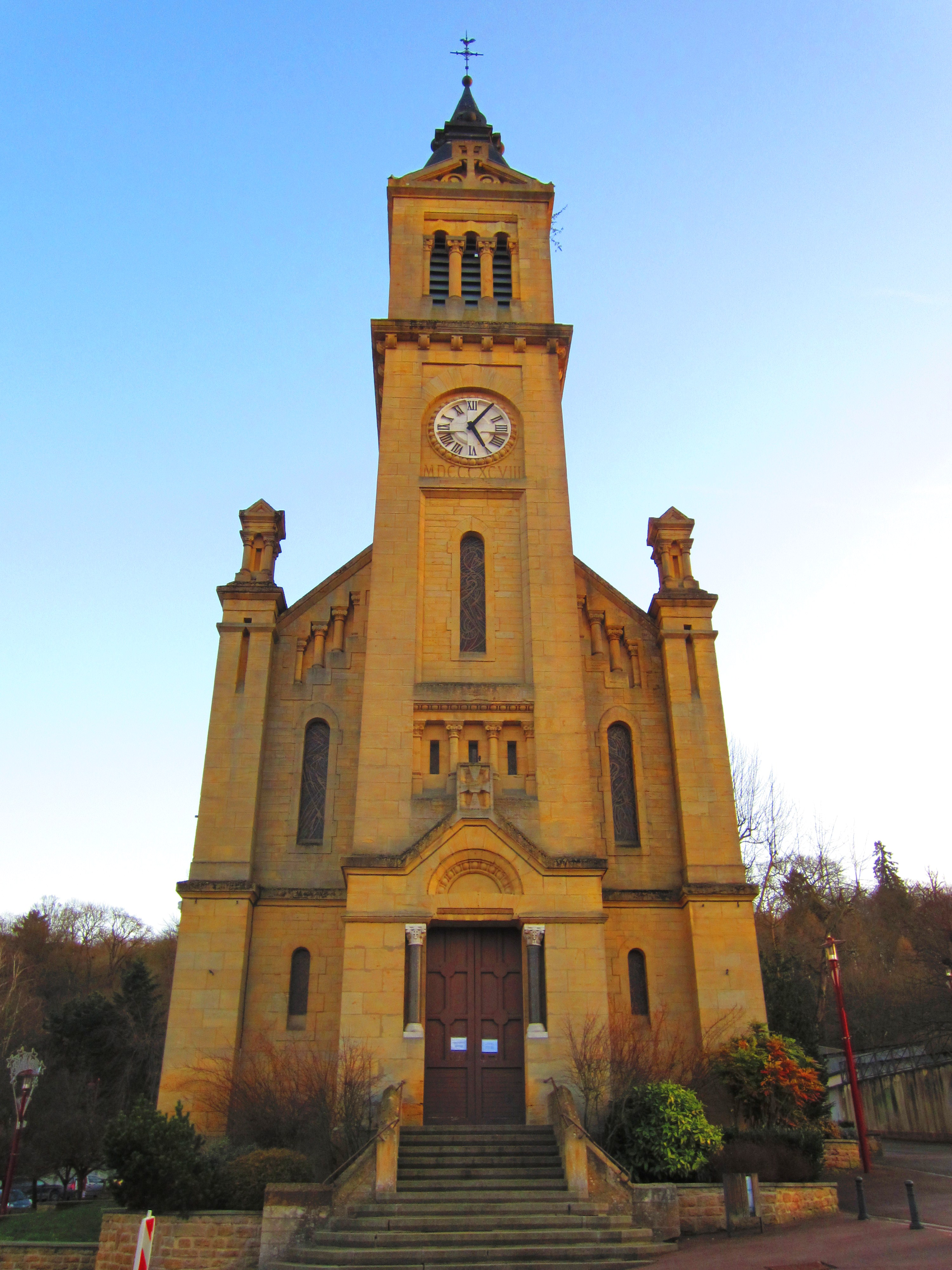
- St. Laurentius' church

- Coat of arms
- Location of Longlaville
- Location within France Location within Grand Est
- Coordinates: 49°32′06″N 5°47′57″E
- Country: France
- Region: Grand Est
- Department: Meurthe-et-Moselle
- Arrondissement: Val-de-Briey
- Canton: Villerupt
- Intercommunality: Grand Longwy Agglomération

Government
  - Mayor (2020–2026): Hamdi Toudma
- Area^{1}: 3.17 km^{2} (1.22 sq mi)
- Elevation: 248 m (814 ft)
- Highest elevation: 391 m (1,283 ft)
- Lowest elevation: 255 m (837 ft)
- Population (2023): 2,377
  - Density: 750/km^{2} (1,940/sq mi)
- Time zone: UTC+01:00 (CET)
  - Summer (DST): UTC+02:00 (CEST)
- INSEE/Postal code: 54321 /54810
- ^{1} French Land Register data, which excludes lakes, ponds, glaciers > 1 km^{2} (0.386 sq mi or 247 acres) and river estuaries.

Longlaville (French pronunciation: [lɔ̃lavil]; German: Longsdorf; Luxembourgish: Longsduerf) is a commune in the Meurthe-et-Moselle department in north-eastern France.

== Population ==
Historical population
Year	Pop.	±% p.a.
1968	3,355	—
1975	2,943	−1.85%
1982	2,625	−1.62%
1990	2,305	−1.61%
1999	2,377	+0.34%
2007	2,481	+0.54%
2012	2,474	−0.06%
2017	2,486	+0.10%
2023	2,377	−0.74%
Source: INSEE

== See also ==
- Communes of the Meurthe-et-Moselle department
