= Hussigny-Godbrange =

- Commune
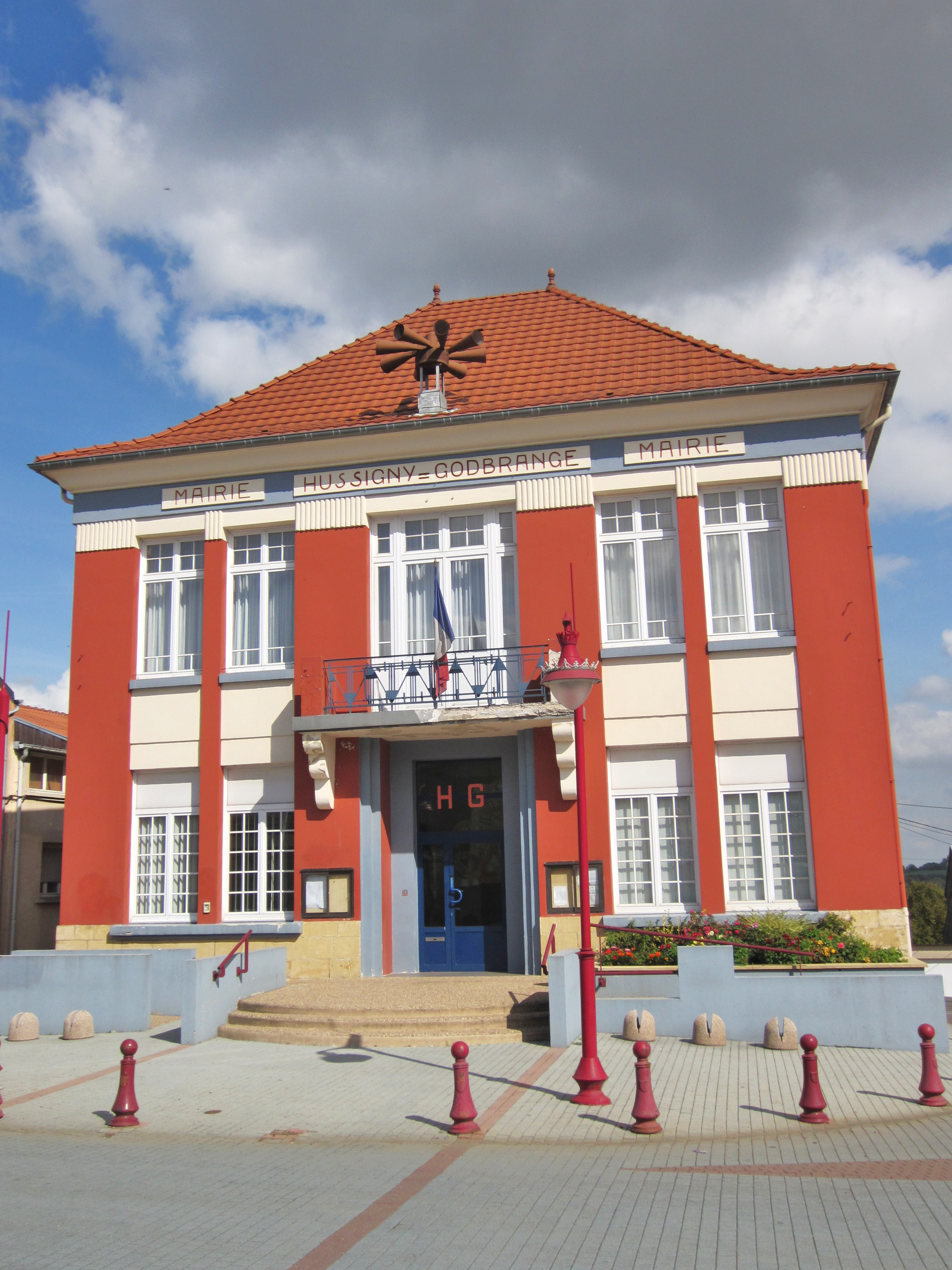
- The town hall

- Coat of arms
- Location of Hussigny-Godbrange
- Location within France Location within Grand Est
- Coordinates: 49°29′37″N 5°52′30″E
- Country: France
- Region: Grand Est
- Department: Meurthe-et-Moselle
- Arrondissement: Val-de-Briey
- Canton: Villerupt
- Intercommunality: Grand Longwy Agglomération

Government
  - Mayor (2024–2026): Laurent Caramelle
- Area^{1}: 15.37 km^{2} (5.93 sq mi)
- Elevation: 423 m (1,388 ft)
- Highest elevation: 445 m (1,460 ft)
- Lowest elevation: 275 m (902 ft)
- Population (2023): 3,912
  - Density: 254.5/km^{2} (659.2/sq mi)
- Time zone: UTC+01:00 (CET)
  - Summer (DST): UTC+02:00 (CEST)
- INSEE/Postal code: 54270 /54590
- Website: www.mairiehussignygodbrange.fr
- ^{1} French Land Register data, which excludes lakes, ponds, glaciers > 1 km^{2} (0.386 sq mi or 247 acres) and river estuaries.

Hussigny-Godbrange (French pronunciation: [ysiɲi ɡɔdbʁɑ̃ʒ]; Luxembourgish: Héiséng-Gueberéng; German: Hussingen-Godbringen) is a commune in the Meurthe-et-Moselle department in north-eastern France. It lies near the border with Luxembourg.

Hussigny-Godbrange is a historic center of Italian immigration in France. Therefore, it was called "Little Italy."

== Population ==
Historical population
Year	Pop.	±% p.a.
1968	3,499	—
1975	3,208	−1.23%
1982	2,871	−1.57%
1990	2,827	−0.19%
1999	3,076	+0.94%
2007	3,243	+0.66%
2012	3,446	+1.22%
2017	3,571	+0.72%
2023	3,912	+1.53%
Source: INSEE

== See also ==
- Communes of the Meurthe-et-Moselle department
