= Mexy =

- Commune
- Coat of arms
- Location of Mexy
- Location within France Location within Grand Est
- Coordinates: 49°30′07″N 5°46′45″E
- Country: France
- Region: Grand Est
- Department: Meurthe-et-Moselle
- Arrondissement: Val-de-Briey
- Canton: Longwy
- Intercommunality: Grand Longwy Agglomération

Government
  - Mayor (2020–2026): Frédéric Wilmin
- Area^{1}: 4.9 km^{2} (1.9 sq mi)
- Elevation: 372 m (1,220 ft)
- Highest elevation: 393 m (1,289 ft)
- Lowest elevation: 267 m (876 ft)
- Population (2023): 2,300
  - Density: 470/km^{2} (1,200/sq mi)
- Time zone: UTC+01:00 (CET)
  - Summer (DST): UTC+02:00 (CEST)
- INSEE/Postal code: 54367 /54135
- ^{1} French Land Register data, which excludes lakes, ponds, glaciers > 1 km^{2} (0.386 sq mi or 247 acres) and river estuaries.

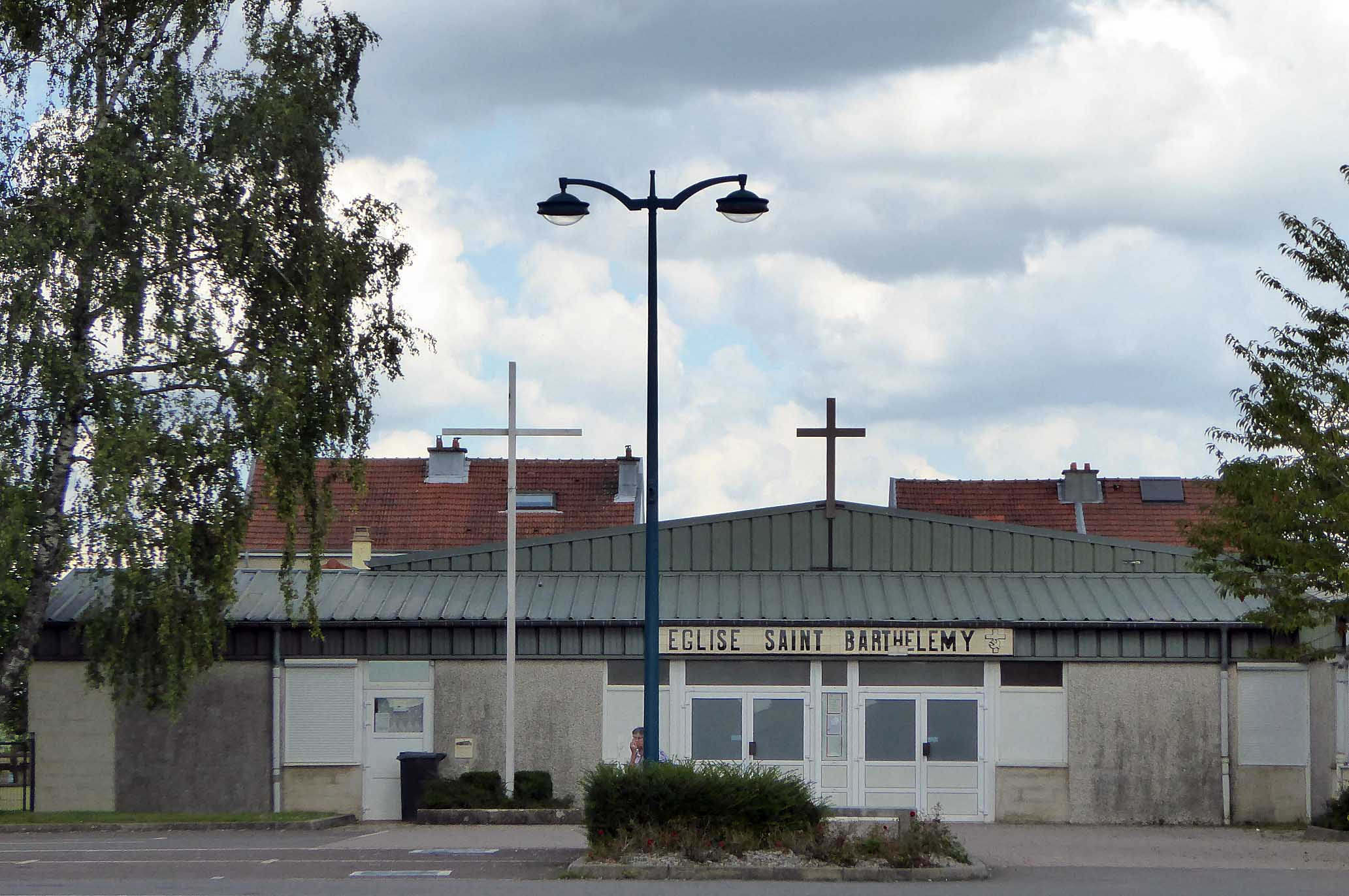
54 MEXY

Mexy (French pronunciation: [mɛksi]) is a commune in the Meurthe-et-Moselle department in north-eastern France.

== Population ==
Historical population
Year	Pop.	±% p.a.
1968	1,684	—
1975	2,496	+5.78%
1982	2,226	−1.62%
1990	1,959	−1.58%
1999	1,997	+0.21%
2007	2,196	+1.19%
2012	2,241	+0.41%
2017	2,283	+0.37%
2023	2,300	+0.12%
Source: INSEE

== See also ==
- Communes of the Meurthe-et-Moselle department
