= Haucourt-Moulaine =

- Commune
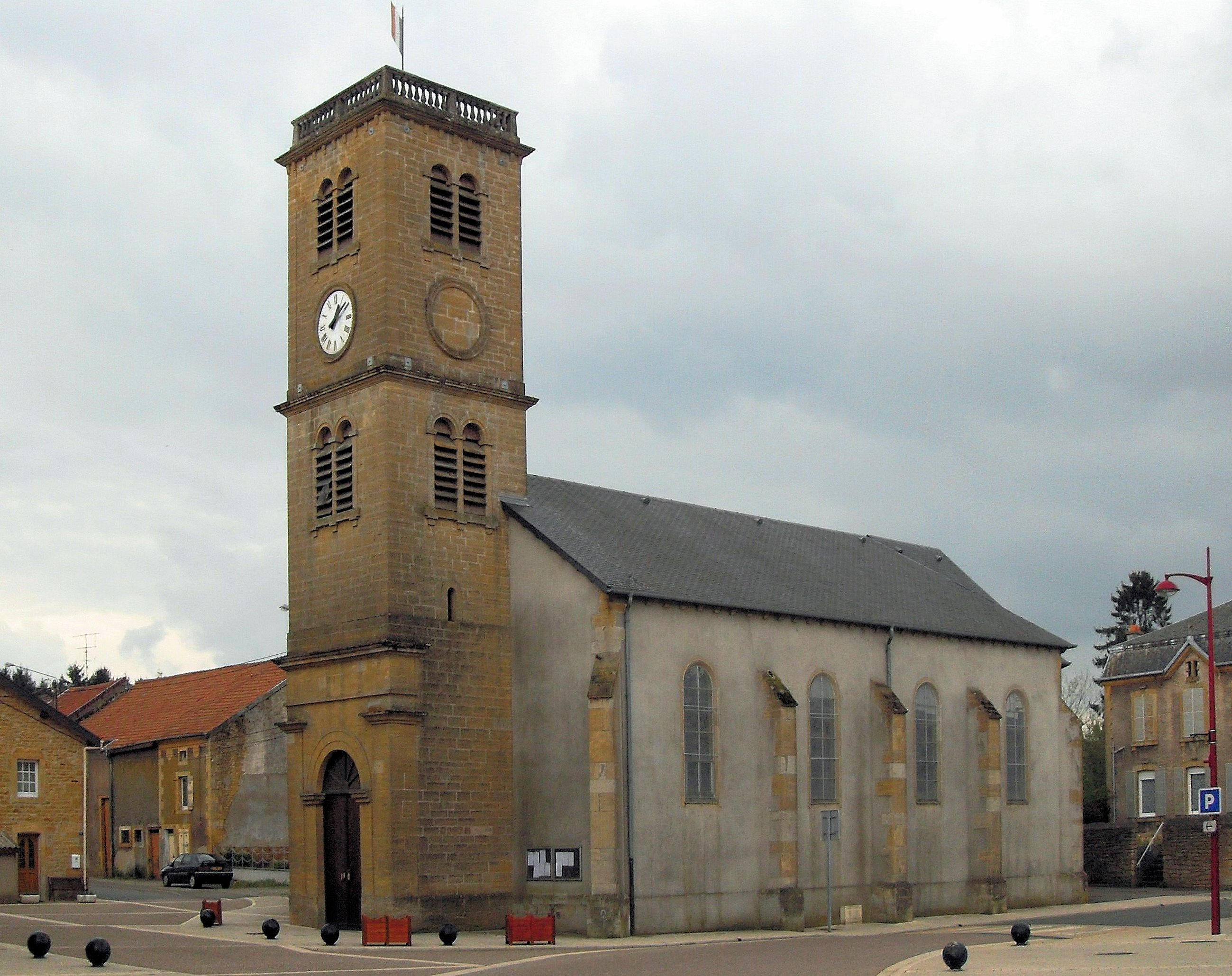
- Saint Eligius' church in Haucourt

- Coat of arms
- Location of Haucourt-Moulaine
- Location within France Location within Grand Est
- Coordinates: 49°29′26″N 5°48′25″E
- Country: France
- Region: Grand Est
- Department: Meurthe-et-Moselle
- Arrondissement: Val-de-Briey
- Canton: Longwy
- Intercommunality: Grand Longwy Agglomération

Government
  - Mayor (2020–2026): Alain Lombardi
- Area^{1}: 7.42 km^{2} (2.86 sq mi)
- Elevation: 382 m (1,253 ft)
- Highest elevation: 391 m (1,283 ft)
- Lowest elevation: 275 m (902 ft)
- Population (2023): 3,495
  - Density: 471/km^{2} (1,220/sq mi)
- Demonym: Haucourt-Moulainois
- Time zone: UTC+01:00 (CET)
  - Summer (DST): UTC+02:00 (CEST)
- INSEE/Postal code: 54254 /54860
- ^{1} French Land Register data, which excludes lakes, ponds, glaciers > 1 km^{2} (0.386 sq mi or 247 acres) and river estuaries.

Haucourt-Moulaine (French pronunciation: [okuʁ mulɛn]) is a commune in the Meurthe-et-Moselle department in north-eastern France.

== Population ==
Historical population
Year	Pop.	±% p.a.
1968	4,651	—
1975	4,517	−0.42%
1982	3,899	−2.08%
1990	3,328	−1.96%
1999	2,987	−1.19%
2007	2,938	−0.21%
2012	3,091	+1.02%
2017	3,241	+0.95%
2023	3,495	+1.27%
Source: INSEE

== See also ==
- Communes of the Meurthe-et-Moselle department
