= Canton of Audun-le-Roman =

Former canton in Meurthe-et-Moselle, France

Coordinates: 49°21′50″N 5°51′10″E

- Former canton
- Location of the canton in the arrondissement of Briey
- Country: France
- Region: Grand Est
- Department: Meurthe-et-Moselle
- No. of communes: {{{nbcomm}}}
- Disbanded: 2015

Government
  - Representatives: Michel Mariuzzo
- Area: 201.4 km^{2} (77.8 sq mi)
- Population (2012): 20,769
  - Density: 103.1/km^{2} (267.1/sq mi)

The canton of Audun-le-Roman (French: Canton d'Audun-le-Roman) is a former French canton located in the department of Meurthe-et-Moselle in the Lorraine region (now part of Grand Est). This canton was organized around Audun-le-Roman in the arrondissement of Briey. It is now part of the canton of Pays de Briey.

The last general councillor from this canton was Michel Mariuzzo (PCF), elected in 2011.

== Composition ==
The canton of Audun-le-Roman grouped together 25 municipalities and had 20,769 inhabitants (2012 census without double counts).

1. Anderny
2. Audun-le-Roman
3. Avillers
4. Bettainvillers
5. Beuvillers
6. Mont-Bonvillers
7. Crusnes
8. Domprix
9. Errouville
10. Joppécourt
11. Joudreville
12. Landres
13. Mairy-Mainville
14. Malavillers
15. Mercy-le-Bas
16. Mercy-le-Haut
17. Murville
18. Piennes
19. Preutin-Higny
20. Saint-Supplet
21. Sancy
22. Serrouville
23. Trieux
24. Tucquegnieux
25. Xivry-Circourt
