= Canton of Briey =

Former canton in Meurthe-et-Moselle, France

Coordinates: 49°15′30″N 5°56′07″E

- Former canton
- Location of the canton in the arrondissement of Briey
- Country: France
- Region: Grand Est
- Department: Meurthe-et-Moselle
- No. of communes: {{{nbcomm}}}
- Disbanded: 2015

Government
  - Representatives: André Corzani
- Area: 97.26 km^{2} (37.55 sq mi)
- Population (2012): 17,493
  - Density: 179.9/km^{2} (465.8/sq mi)

The canton of Briey (French: Canton de Briey) is a former French canton located in the department of Meurthe-et-Moselle in the Lorraine region (now part of Grand Est). This canton was organized around Briey in the arrondissement of Briey. It is now part of the canton of Pays de Briey.

The last general councillor from this canton was André Corzani (PCF), elected in 2001.

== Composition ==
The canton of Briey grouped together 9 municipalities and had 17,493 inhabitants (2012 census without double counts).

1. Anoux
2. Avril
3. Les Baroches
4. Briey
5. Jœuf
6. Lantéfontaine
7. Lubey
8. Mance
9. Mancieulles
