= Anoux =

- Commune
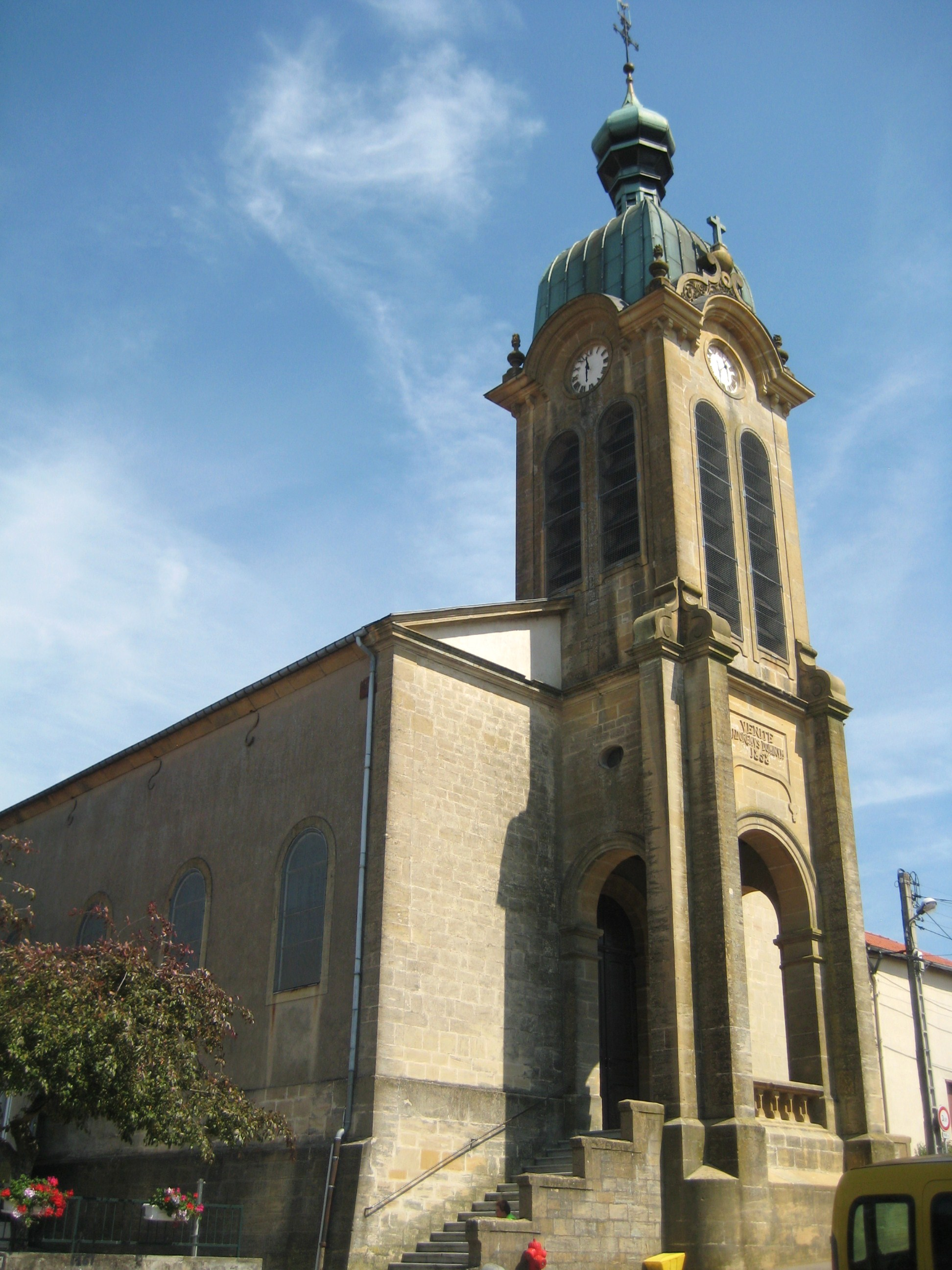
- The church in Anoux

- Coat of arms
- Location of Anoux
- Location within France Location within Grand Est
- Coordinates: 49°16′34″N 5°52′10″E
- Country: France
- Region: Grand Est
- Department: Meurthe-et-Moselle
- Arrondissement: Val-de-Briey
- Canton: Pays de Briey

Government
  - Mayor (2020–2026): André Berg
- Area^{1}: 9.88 km^{2} (3.81 sq mi)
- Elevation: 248 m (814 ft)
- Highest elevation: 275 m (902 ft)
- Lowest elevation: 227 m (745 ft)
- Population (2023): 270
  - Density: 27/km^{2} (71/sq mi)
- Time zone: UTC+01:00 (CET)
  - Summer (DST): UTC+02:00 (CEST)
- INSEE/Postal code: 54018 /54150
- ^{1} French Land Register data, which excludes lakes, ponds, glaciers > 1 km^{2} (0.386 sq mi or 247 acres) and river estuaries.

Anoux (French pronunciation: [anu]) is a commune in the Meurthe-et-Moselle department in northeastern France.

== Geography ==
Anoux is a rural commune, as it is one of the communes with low or very low density, according to the Insee communal density grid.

The municipalities adjacent to Anoux are Val de Briey, Mairy-Mainville, Tucquegnieux, Lantéfontaine and Norroy-le-sec.

The village is a linear settlement.

== Population ==
Historical population
Year	Pop.	±% p.a.
1968	305	—
1975	251	−2.75%
1982	332	+4.08%
1990	309	−0.89%
1999	287	−0.82%
2007	277	−0.44%
2012	253	−1.80%
2017	265	+0.93%
2023	270	+0.31%
Source: INSEE

== Toponymy ==
The origin of the name of the village is not clearly established, however several assumptions have been made.

The first official mention of the name of the commune goes back to the 15th century. It is then designated under the names of Aunou, Alnova or Anow.

The -OW ending of Anow may suggest that the name of the village is of Gallic origin. However, it has also been assumed that the name Alnova could be related to the Latin name Alnoleum, meaning place planted with alders.

Thereafter, Anoux will be designated under the name : Alnowe devant Briey (1437), Anowe (1489), Anoult or Anoul (1519), Anou (17th century), Anould (1669-1670), Anoud or Anoux (1689), Annoux (1756) and then, Anoux (1793).

== Local culture ==
=== The legend of St. Paulinus ===
A legend tells that St. Paulinus, the patron saint of Anoux, performed a miracle in the village. According to this story, Paulinus, then bishop of Trier and accompanied by soldiers, was on his way to fight the barbarian invasions. While the troop was dying of thirst, overwhelmed by the August sun, a stop was made at Anoux, where the bishop made a spring flow. It was nicknamed the Bonne Fontaine (Good Fountain) and the legend tells that its water could cure several diseases.

== See also ==
- Communes of the Meurthe-et-Moselle department
