= Beuvillers =

Beuvillers is the name of several communes in France:

- Beuvillers, Calvados
- Beuvillers, Meurthe-et-Moselle
