= Arrondissement of Val-de-Briey =

Coordinates: 49.25°N 5.93°E

Val-de-Briey
- Arrondissement
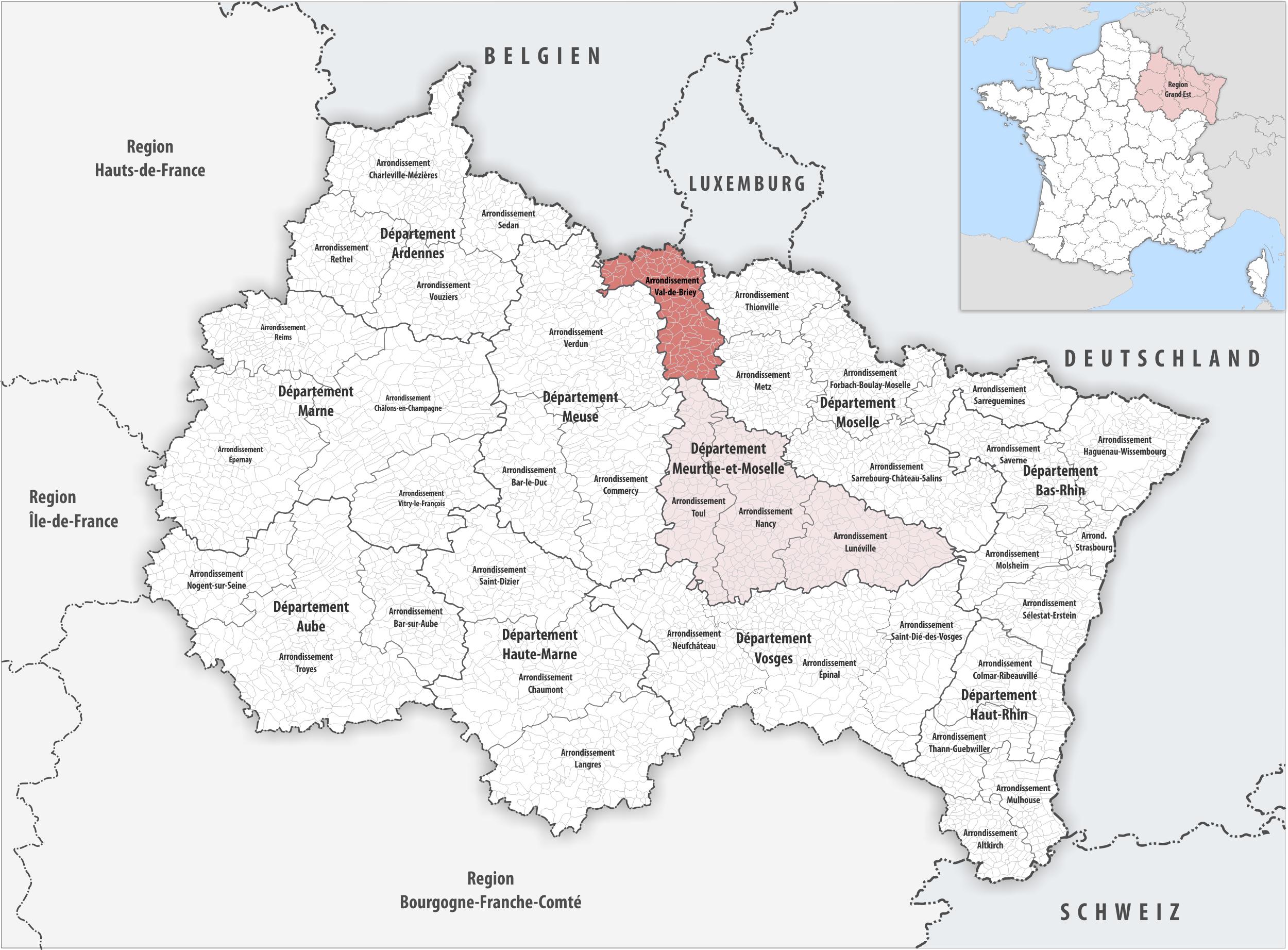
- Location within the region Grand Est
- Country: France
- Region: Grand Est
- Department: Meurthe-et-Moselle
- No. of communes: {{{nbcomm}}}
- Area: 1,018.4 km^{2} (393.2 sq mi)
- Population (2023): 165,510
  - Density: 162.52/km^{2} (420.92/sq mi)
- INSEE code: 541

The arrondissement of Val-de-Briey (arrondissement of Briey until 2022) is an arrondissement of France in the Meurthe-et-Moselle department in the Grand Est region. It has 115 communes. Its population is 164,402 (2021), and its area is 1,018.4 km^{2} (393.2 sq mi).

== Composition ==
The communes of the arrondissement of Val-de-Briey, and their INSEE codes, are:

1. Abbéville-lès-Conflans (54002)
2. Affléville (54004)
3. Allamont (54009)
4. Allondrelle-la-Malmaison (54011)
5. Anderny (54015)
6. Anoux (54018)
7. Auboué (54028)
8. Audun-le-Roman (54029)
9. Avillers (54033)
10. Avril (54036)
11. Les Baroches (54048)
12. Baslieux (54049)
13. Batilly (54051)
14. Bazailles (54056)
15. Béchamps (54058)
16. Bettainvillers (54066)
17. Beuveille (54067)
18. Beuvillers (54069)
19. Boismont (54081)
20. Boncourt (54082)
21. Brainville (54093)
22. Bréhain-la-Ville (54096)
23. Bruville (54103)
24. Charency-Vezin (54118)
25. Chenières (54127)
26. Colmey (54134)
27. Conflans-en-Jarnisy (54136)
28. Cons-la-Grandville (54137)
29. Cosnes-et-Romain (54138)
30. Crusnes (54149)
31. Cutry (54151)
32. Domprix (54169)
33. Doncourt-lès-Conflans (54171)
34. Doncourt-lès-Longuyon (54172)
35. Épiez-sur-Chiers (54178)
36. Errouville (54181)
37. Fillières (54194)
38. Fléville-Lixières (54198)
39. Fresnois-la-Montagne (54212)
40. Friauville (54213)
41. Giraumont (54227)
42. Gondrecourt-Aix (54231)
43. Gorcy (54234)
44. Grand-Failly (54236)
45. Han-devant-Pierrepont (54602)
46. Hatrize (54253)
47. Haucourt-Moulaine (54254)
48. Herserange (54261)
49. Homécourt (54263)
50. Hussigny-Godbrange (54270)
51. Jarny (54273)
52. Jeandelize (54277)
53. Jœuf (54280)
54. Joppécourt (54282)
55. Jouaville (54283)
56. Joudreville (54284)
57. Labry (54286)
58. Laix (54290)
59. Landres (54295)
60. Lantéfontaine (54302)
61. Lexy (54314)
62. Longlaville (54321)
63. Longuyon (54322)
64. Longwy (54323)
65. Lubey (54326)
66. Mairy-Mainville (54334)
67. Malavillers (54337)
68. Mercy-le-Bas (54362)
69. Mercy-le-Haut (54363)
70. Mexy (54367)
71. Moineville (54371)
72. Mont-Bonvillers (54084)
73. Montigny-sur-Chiers (54378)
74. Mont-Saint-Martin (54382)
75. Morfontaine (54385)
76. Mouaville (54389)
77. Moutiers (54391)
78. Murville (54394)
79. Norroy-le-Sec (54402)
80. Olley (54408)
81. Othe (54412)
82. Ozerailles (54413)
83. Petit-Failly (54420)
84. Piennes (54425)
85. Pierrepont (54428)
86. Preutin-Higny (54436)
87. Puxe (54440)
88. Réhon (54451)
89. Saint-Ail (54469)
90. Saint-Jean-lès-Longuyon (54476)
91. Saint-Marcel (54478)
92. Saint-Pancré (54485)
93. Saint-Supplet (54489)
94. Sancy (54491)
95. Saulnes (54493)
96. Serrouville (54504)
97. Tellancourt (54514)
98. Thil (54521)
99. Thumeréville (54524)
100. Tiercelet (54525)
101. Trieux (54533)
102. Tucquegnieux (54536)
103. Ugny (54537)
104. Val de Briey (54099)
105. Valleroy (54542)
106. Ville-au-Montois (54568)
107. Ville-Houdlémont (54572)
108. Villers-la-Chèvre (54574)
109. Villers-la-Montagne (54575)
110. Villers-le-Rond (54576)
111. Villerupt (54580)
112. Ville-sur-Yron (54581)
113. Villette (54582)
114. Viviers-sur-Chiers (54590)
115. Xivry-Circourt (54598)

== History ==
The arrondissement of Briey was created as part of the department Moselle in 1800. Since 1871 it has been a part of the department Meurthe-et-Moselle. In January 2023, it lost 13 communes to the arrondissement of Toul.

As a result of the reorganisation of the cantons of France which came into effect in 2015, the borders of the cantons are no longer related to the borders of the arrondissements. The cantons of the arrondissement of Briey were, as of January 2015:

1. Audun-le-Roman
2. Briey
3. Chambley-Bussières
4. Conflans-en-Jarnisy
5. Herserange
6. Homécourt
7. Longuyon
8. Longwy
9. Mont-Saint-Martin
10. Villerupt
