= Mouaville =

- Commune
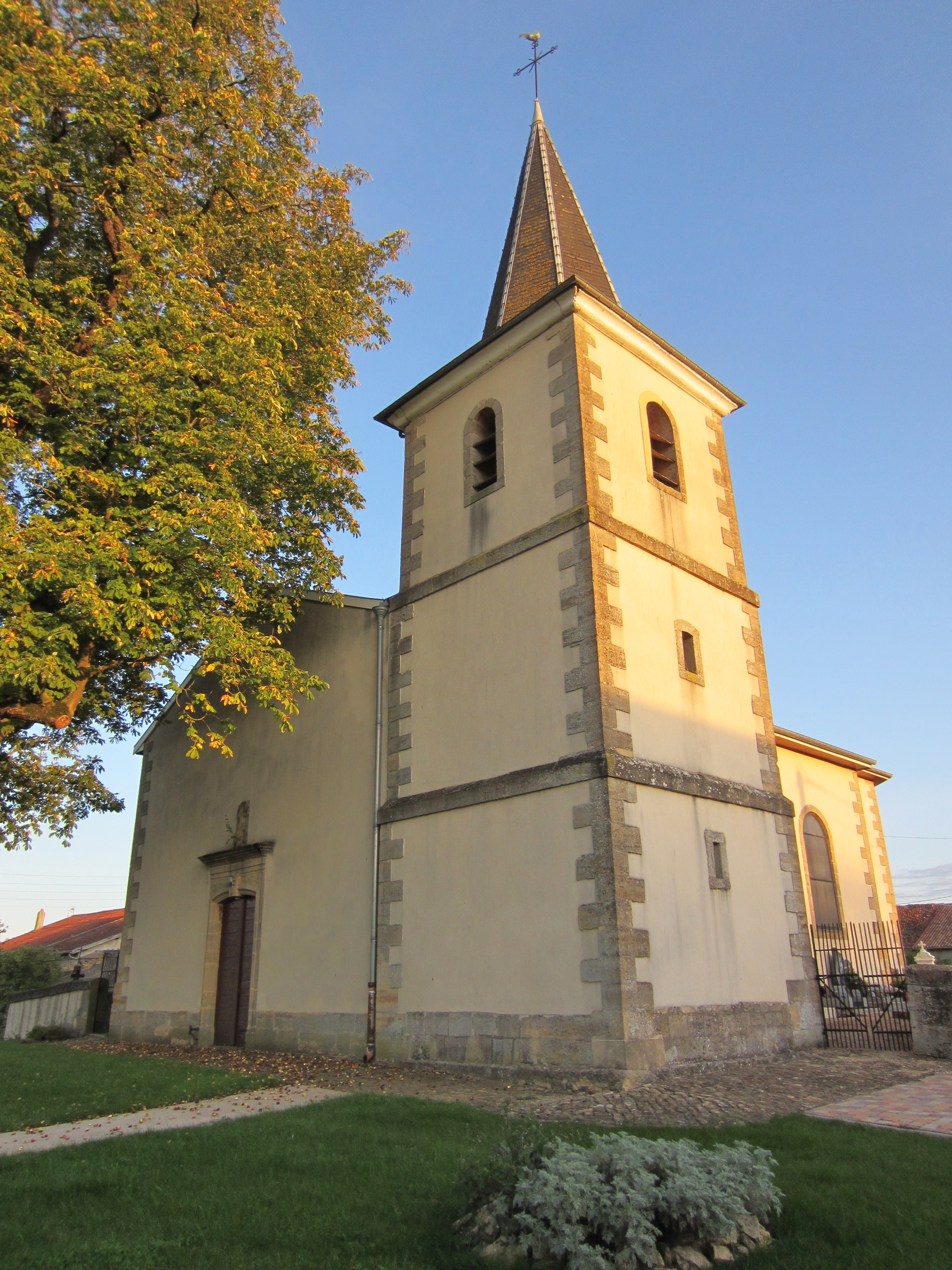
- The church in Mouaville

- Coat of arms
- Location of Mouaville
- Location within France Location within Grand Est
- Coordinates: 49°12′39″N 5°46′19″E
- Country: France
- Region: Grand Est
- Department: Meurthe-et-Moselle
- Arrondissement: Val-de-Briey
- Canton: Pays de Briey
- Intercommunality: Orne Lorraine Confluences

Government
  - Mayor (2020–2026): Denis Delatte
- Area^{1}: 8.44 km^{2} (3.26 sq mi)
- Elevation: 248 m (814 ft)
- Highest elevation: 265 m (869 ft)
- Lowest elevation: 207 m (679 ft)
- Population (2023): 106
  - Density: 12.6/km^{2} (32.5/sq mi)
- Time zone: UTC+01:00 (CET)
  - Summer (DST): UTC+02:00 (CEST)
- INSEE/Postal code: 54389 /54800
- ^{1} French Land Register data, which excludes lakes, ponds, glaciers > 1 km^{2} (0.386 sq mi or 247 acres) and river estuaries.

Mouaville (French pronunciation: [mwavil]) is a commune in the Meurthe-et-Moselle department in north-eastern France.

== See also ==
- Communes of the Meurthe-et-Moselle department
