= Béchamps =

- Commune
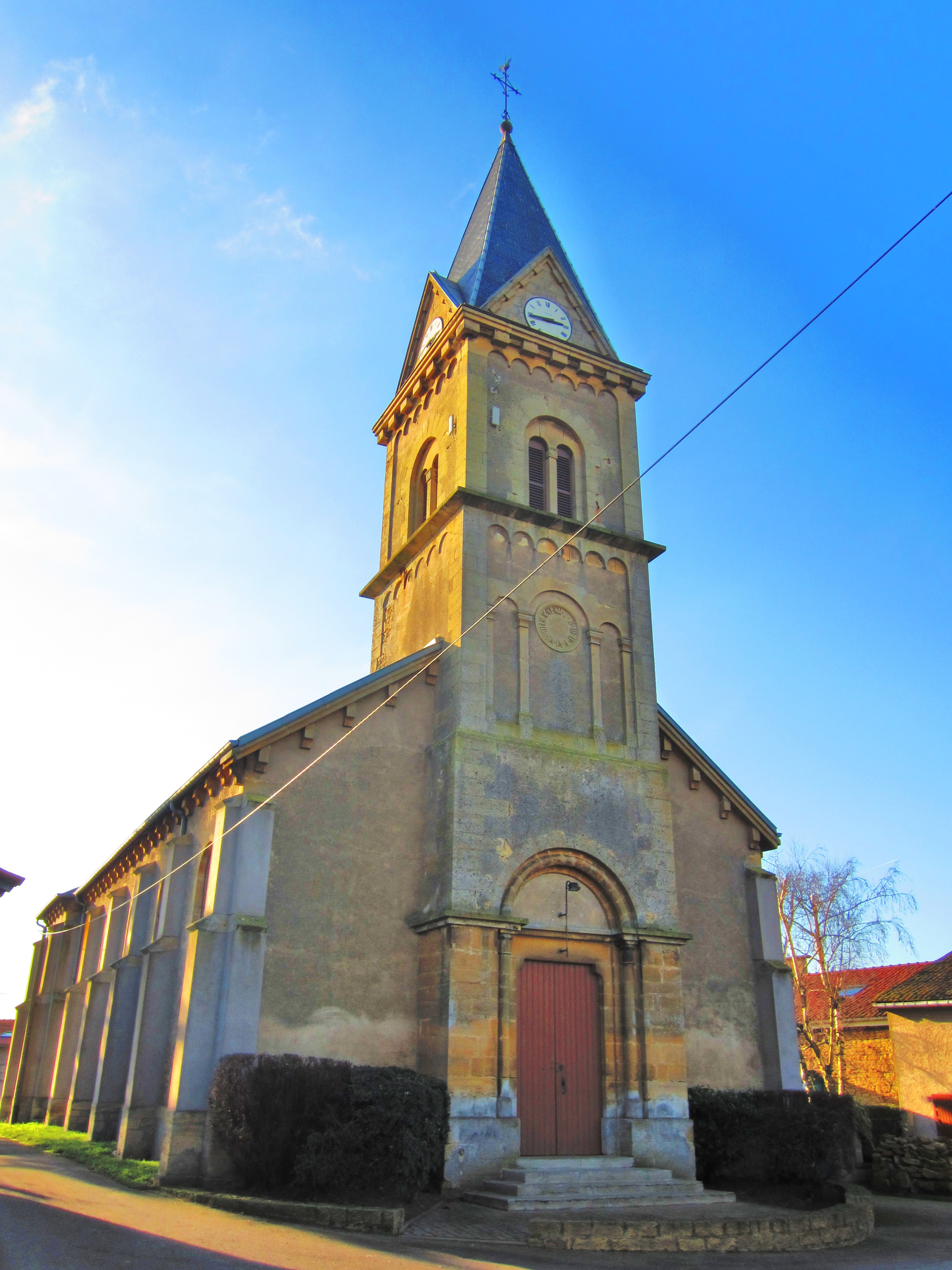
- The church in Béchamps

- Coat of arms
- Location of Béchamps
- Location within France Location within Grand Est
- Coordinates: 49°12′41″N 5°44′22″E
- Country: France
- Region: Grand Est
- Department: Meurthe-et-Moselle
- Arrondissement: Val-de-Briey
- Canton: Pays de Briey
- Intercommunality: Orne Lorraine Confluences

Government
  - Mayor (2020–2026): Didier Lapointe
- Area^{1}: 9.28 km^{2} (3.58 sq mi)
- Elevation: 225 m (738 ft)
- Highest elevation: 272 m (892 ft)
- Lowest elevation: 203 m (666 ft)
- Population (2023): 80
  - Density: 8.6/km^{2} (22/sq mi)
- Time zone: UTC+01:00 (CET)
  - Summer (DST): UTC+02:00 (CEST)
- INSEE/Postal code: 54058 /54800
- ^{1} French Land Register data, which excludes lakes, ponds, glaciers > 1 km^{2} (0.386 sq mi or 247 acres) and river estuaries.

Béchamps (French pronunciation: [beʃɑ̃]) is a commune in the Meurthe-et-Moselle department in northeastern France.

== Population ==
Historical population
Year	Pop.	±% p.a.
1968	104	—
1975	93	−1.58%
1982	80	−2.13%
1990	83	+0.46%
1999	79	−0.55%
2007	76	−0.48%
2012	88	+2.98%
2017	86	−0.46%
2023	80	−1.20%
Source: INSEE

== See also ==
- Communes of the Meurthe-et-Moselle department
