= Abbéville-lès-Conflans =

- Commune
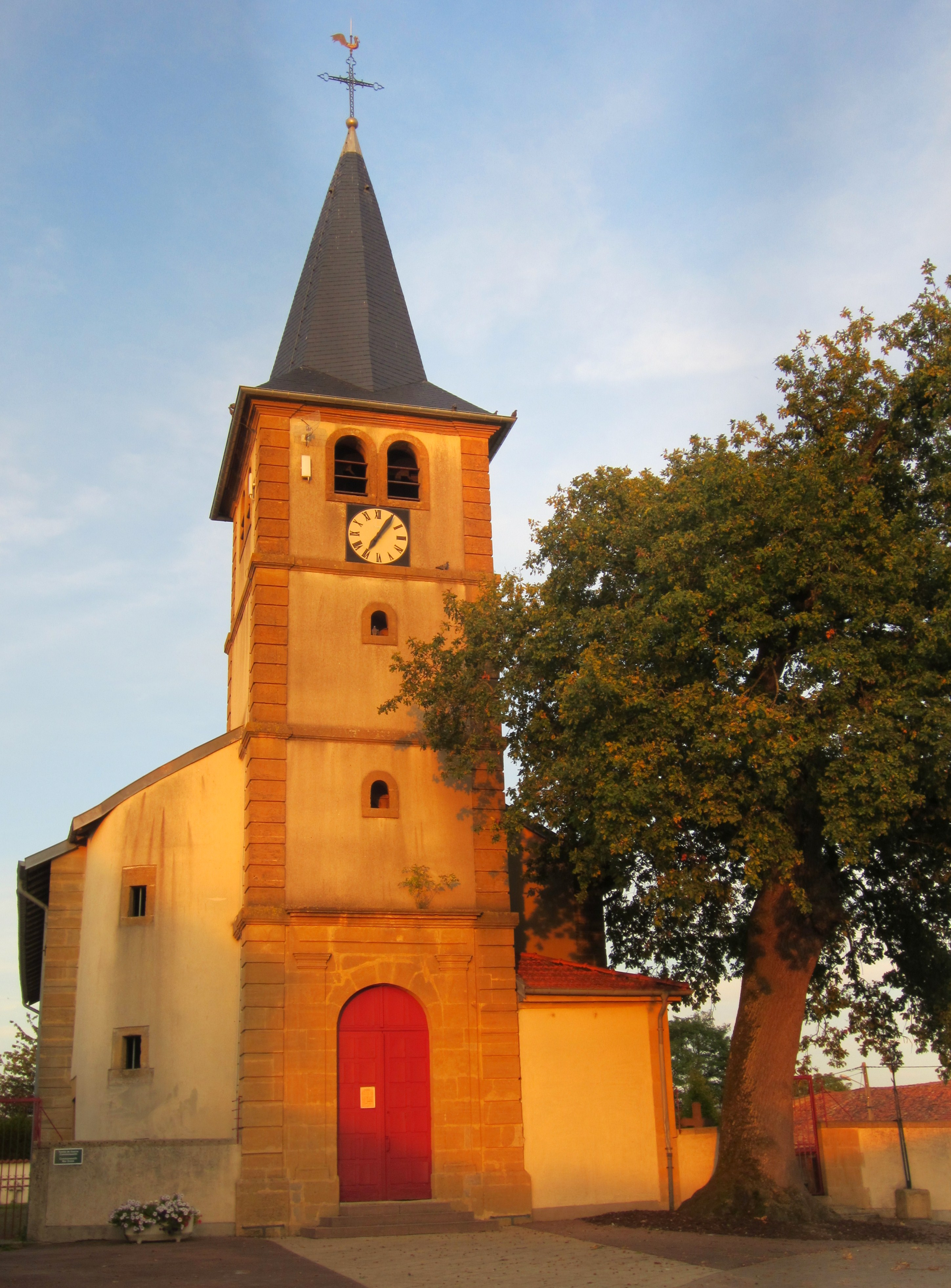
- The church in Abbéville-lès-Conflans

- Coat of arms
- Location of Abbéville-lès-Conflans
- Location within France Location within Grand Est
- Coordinates: 49°11′55″N 5°50′43″E
- Country: France
- Region: Grand Est
- Department: Meurthe-et-Moselle
- Arrondissement: Val-de-Briey
- Canton: Pays de Briey
- Intercommunality: Orne Lorraine Confluences

Government
  - Mayor (2020–2026): Daniel Poleggi
- Area^{1}: 7.73 km^{2} (2.98 sq mi)
- Elevation: 224 m (735 ft)
- Highest elevation: 230 m (750 ft)
- Lowest elevation: 196 m (643 ft)
- Population (2023): 240
  - Density: 31/km^{2} (80/sq mi)
- Demonym(s): Abbévillois, Abbévilloises
- Time zone: UTC+01:00 (CET)
  - Summer (DST): UTC+02:00 (CEST)
- INSEE/Postal code: 54002 /54800
- ^{1} French Land Register data, which excludes lakes, ponds, glaciers > 1 km^{2} (0.386 sq mi or 247 acres) and river estuaries.

Abbéville-lès-Conflans (French pronunciation: [abevil le kɔ̃flɑ̃], lit. 'Abbéville near Conflans') is a commune in the Meurthe-et-Moselle department in northeastern France.

== Population ==
Inhabitants are called Abbévillois in French.

Historical population

Year	Pop.	±% p.a.
1793	460	—
1821	418	−0.34%
1841	406	−0.15%
1861	406	+0.00%
1872	367	−0.91%
1886	341	−0.52%
1901	302	−0.81%
1921	251	−0.92%
1936	232	−0.52%
1946	251	+0.79%
1954	270	+0.92%

Year	Pop.	±% p.a.
1962	242	−1.36%
1968	219	−1.65%
1975	201	−1.22%
1982	186	−1.10%
1990	222	+2.24%
1999	244	+1.06%
2007	227	−0.90%
2012	228	+0.09%
2017	226	−0.18%
2023	240	+1.01%

Source: EHESS and INSEE

== See also ==
- Communes of the Meurthe-et-Moselle department
