= Ozerailles =

- Commune
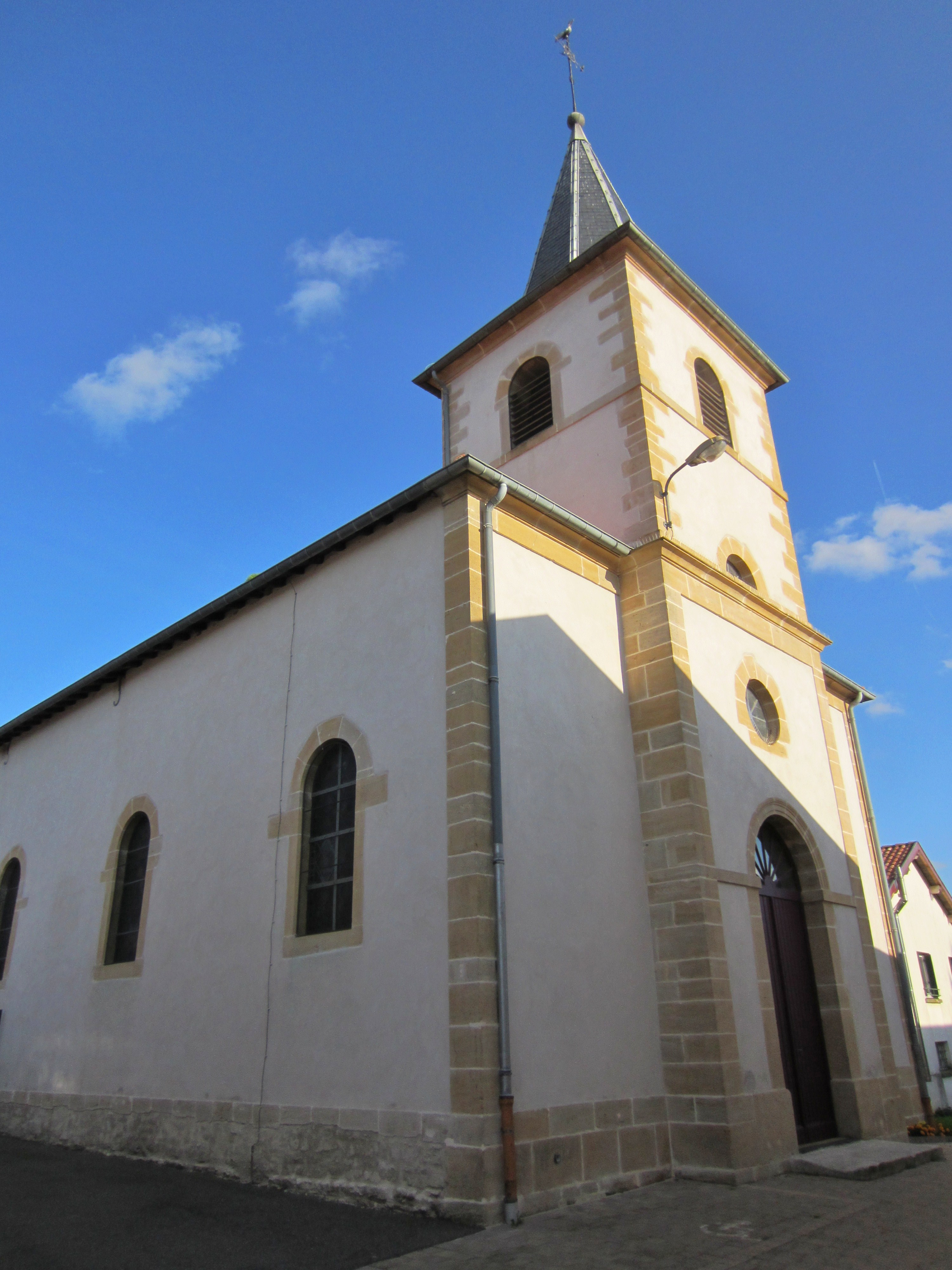
- The church in Ozerailles

- Coat of arms
- Location of Ozerailles
- Location within France Location within Grand Est
- Coordinates: 49°13′53″N 5°50′29″E
- Country: France
- Region: Grand Est
- Department: Meurthe-et-Moselle
- Arrondissement: Val-de-Briey
- Canton: Pays de Briey
- Intercommunality: Orne Lorraine Confluences

Government
  - Mayor (2024–2026): Victorien Barthelemy
- Area^{1}: 6.32 km^{2} (2.44 sq mi)
- Elevation: 212 m (696 ft)
- Highest elevation: 236 m (774 ft)
- Lowest elevation: 202 m (663 ft)
- Population (2023): 145
  - Density: 22.9/km^{2} (59.4/sq mi)
- Time zone: UTC+01:00 (CET)
  - Summer (DST): UTC+02:00 (CEST)
- INSEE/Postal code: 54413 /54150
- ^{1} French Land Register data, which excludes lakes, ponds, glaciers > 1 km^{2} (0.386 sq mi or 247 acres) and river estuaries.

Ozerailles (French pronunciation: [ozʁaj]) is a commune in the Meurthe-et-Moselle department in north-eastern France.

== See also ==
- Communes of the Meurthe-et-Moselle department
