= Thumeréville =

- Commune
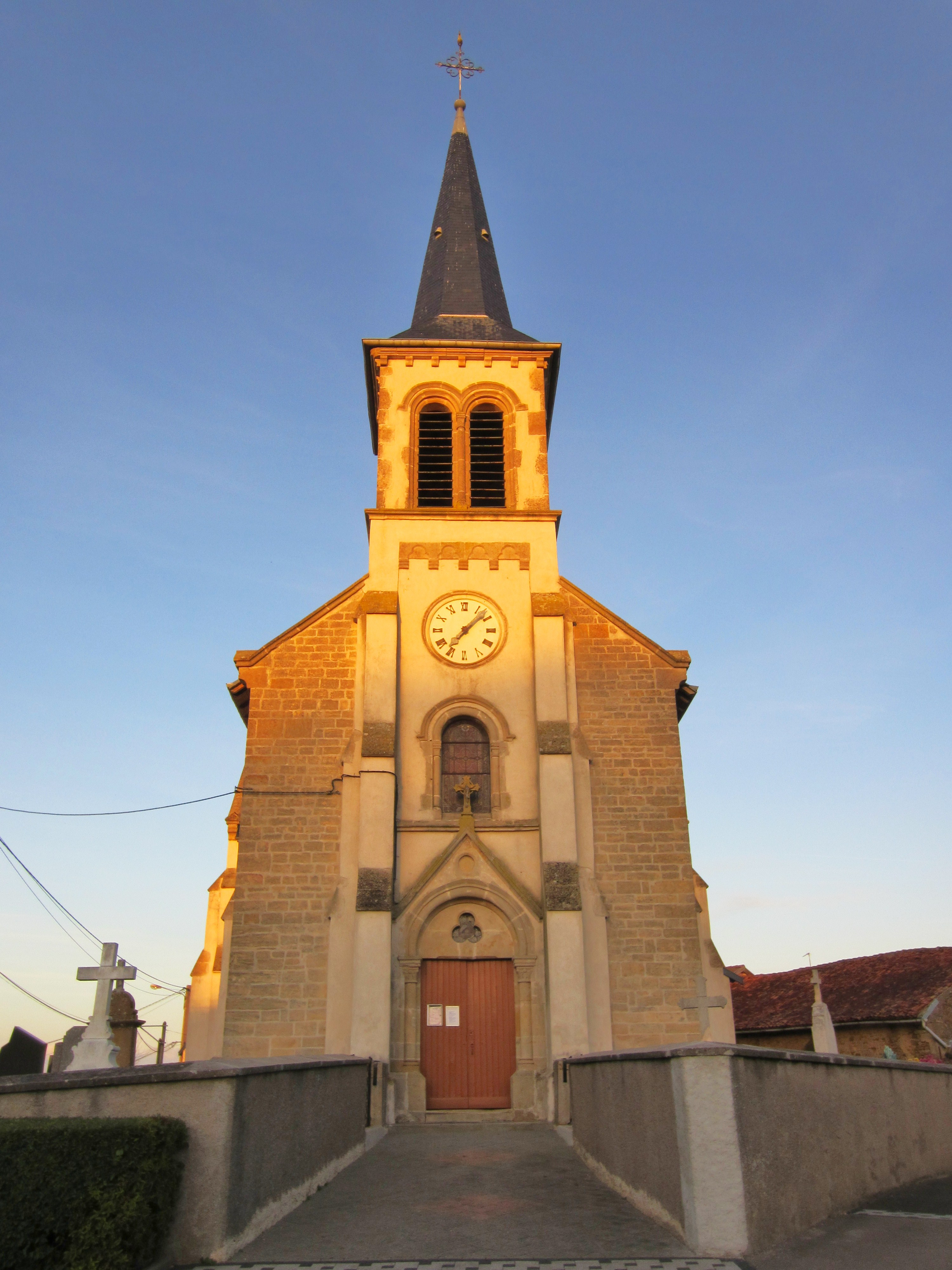
- The church in Thumeréville

- Coat of arms
- Location of Thumeréville
- Location within France Location within Grand Est
- Coordinates: 49°12′06″N 5°47′51″E
- Country: France
- Region: Grand Est
- Department: Meurthe-et-Moselle
- Arrondissement: Val-de-Briey
- Canton: Pays de Briey
- Intercommunality: Orne Lorraine Confluences

Government
  - Mayor (2020–2026): Éric François
- Area^{1}: 7.89 km^{2} (3.05 sq mi)
- Elevation: 229 m (751 ft)
- Highest elevation: 233 m (764 ft)
- Lowest elevation: 197 m (646 ft)
- Population (2023): 103
  - Density: 13.1/km^{2} (33.8/sq mi)
- Time zone: UTC+01:00 (CET)
  - Summer (DST): UTC+02:00 (CEST)
- INSEE/Postal code: 54524 /54800
- ^{1} French Land Register data, which excludes lakes, ponds, glaciers > 1 km^{2} (0.386 sq mi or 247 acres) and river estuaries.

Thumeréville (French pronunciation: [tymʁevil]) is a commune in the Meurthe-et-Moselle department in north-eastern France.

== See also ==
- Communes of the Meurthe-et-Moselle department
