= Avillers, Meurthe-et-Moselle =

Avillers
- Commune
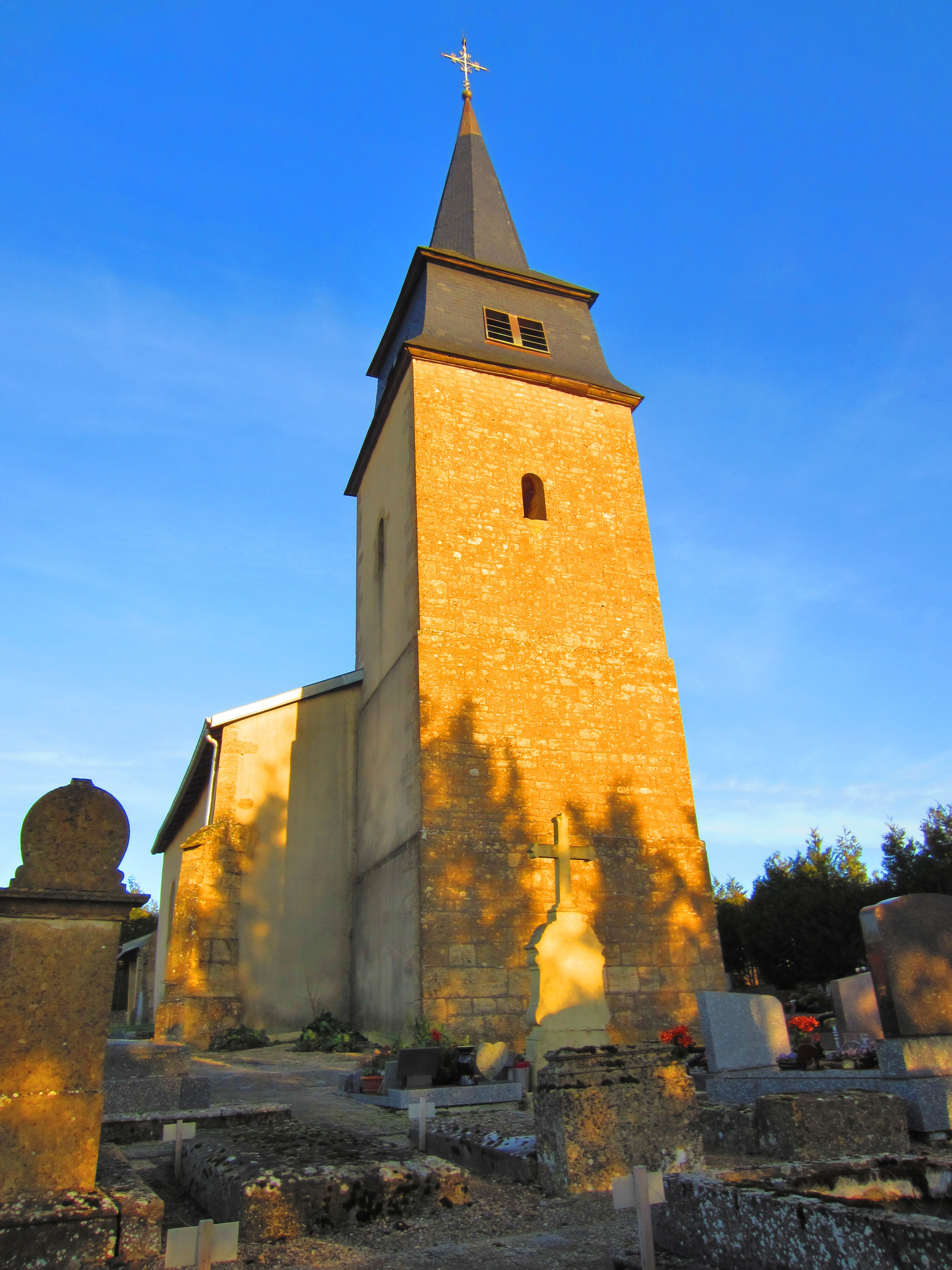
- The church in Avillers

- Coat of arms
- Location of Avillers
- Location within France Location within Grand Est
- Coordinates: 49°19′27″N 5°44′12″E
- Country: France
- Region: Grand Est
- Department: Meurthe-et-Moselle
- Arrondissement: Val-de-Briey
- Canton: Pays de Briey
- Intercommunality: Cœur du Pays-Haut

Government
  - Mayor (2020–2026): Gérard Thiriat
- Area^{1}: 5.16 km^{2} (1.99 sq mi)
- Elevation: 268 m (879 ft)
- Highest elevation: 312 m (1,024 ft)
- Lowest elevation: 247 m (810 ft)
- Population (2023): 141
  - Density: 27.3/km^{2} (70.8/sq mi)
- Time zone: UTC+01:00 (CET)
  - Summer (DST): UTC+02:00 (CEST)
- INSEE/Postal code: 54033 /54490
- ^{1} French Land Register data, which excludes lakes, ponds, glaciers > 1 km^{2} (0.386 sq mi or 247 acres) and river estuaries.

Avillers is a commune in the Meurthe-et-Moselle department in northeastern France.

== Population ==
Historical population
Year	Pop.	±% p.a.
1968	96	—
1975	74	−3.65%
1982	74	+0.00%
1990	58	−3.00%
1999	79	+3.49%
2007	79	+0.00%
2012	98	+4.40%
2017	123	+4.65%
2023	141	+2.30%
Source: INSEE

== See also ==
- Communes of the Meurthe-et-Moselle department
