= Joppécourt =

- Commune
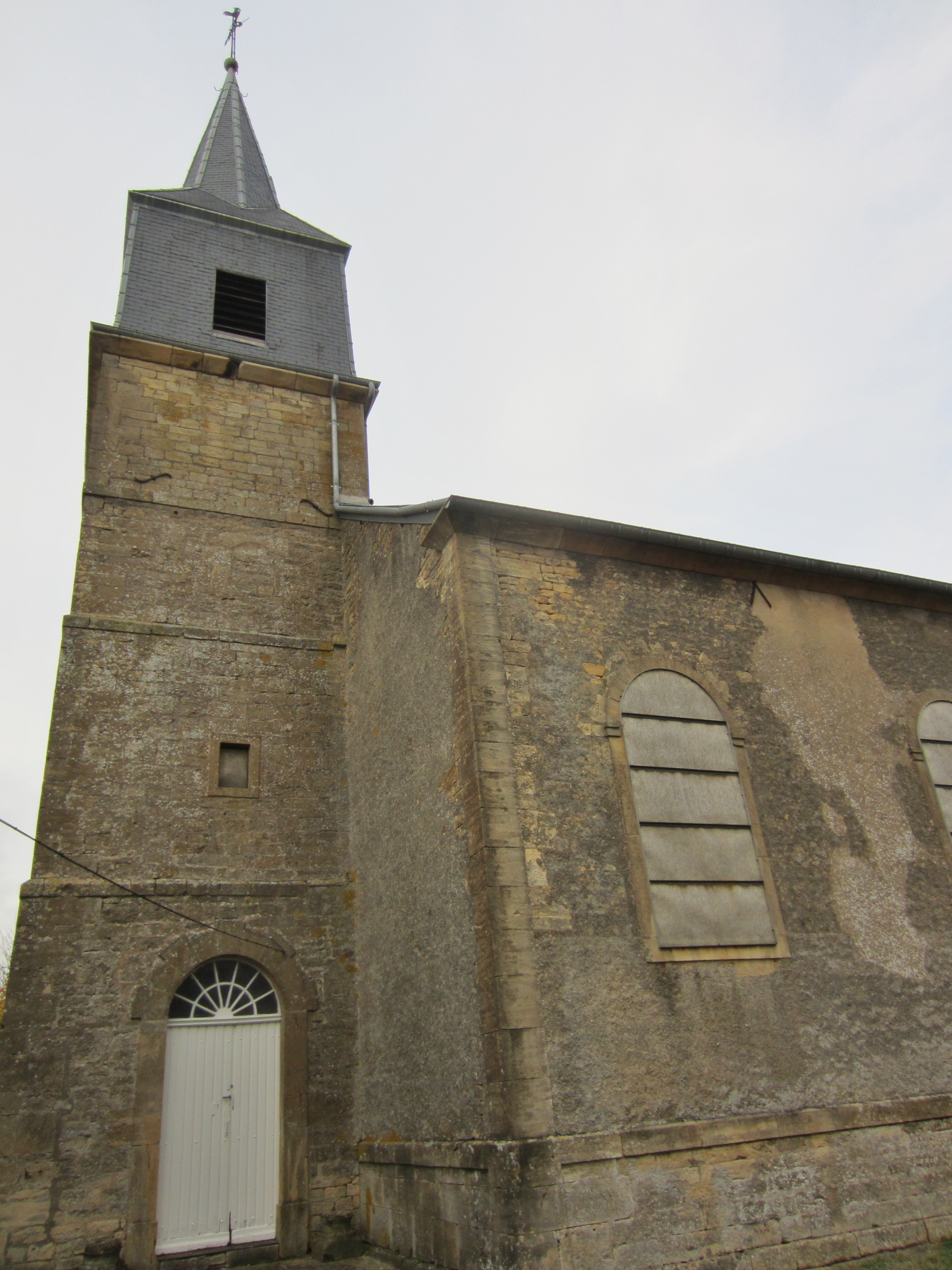
- The church in Joppécourt

- Coat of arms
- Location of Joppécourt
- Location within France Location within Grand Est
- Coordinates: 49°23′20″N 5°47′46″E
- Country: France
- Region: Grand Est
- Department: Meurthe-et-Moselle
- Arrondissement: Val-de-Briey
- Canton: Pays de Briey
- Intercommunality: Cœur du Pays-Haut

Government
  - Mayor (2020–2026): Patrick Coignet
- Area^{1}: 6.98 km^{2} (2.69 sq mi)
- Elevation: 315 m (1,033 ft)
- Highest elevation: 360 m (1,180 ft)
- Lowest elevation: 259 m (850 ft)
- Population (2023): 150
  - Density: 21/km^{2} (56/sq mi)
- Time zone: UTC+01:00 (CET)
  - Summer (DST): UTC+02:00 (CEST)
- INSEE/Postal code: 54282 /54620
- ^{1} French Land Register data, which excludes lakes, ponds, glaciers > 1 km^{2} (0.386 sq mi or 247 acres) and river estuaries.

Joppécourt (French pronunciation: [ʒɔpekuʁ]) is a commune in the Meurthe-et-Moselle department in north-eastern France.

== See also ==
- Communes of the Meurthe-et-Moselle department
