= Trieux =

- Commune
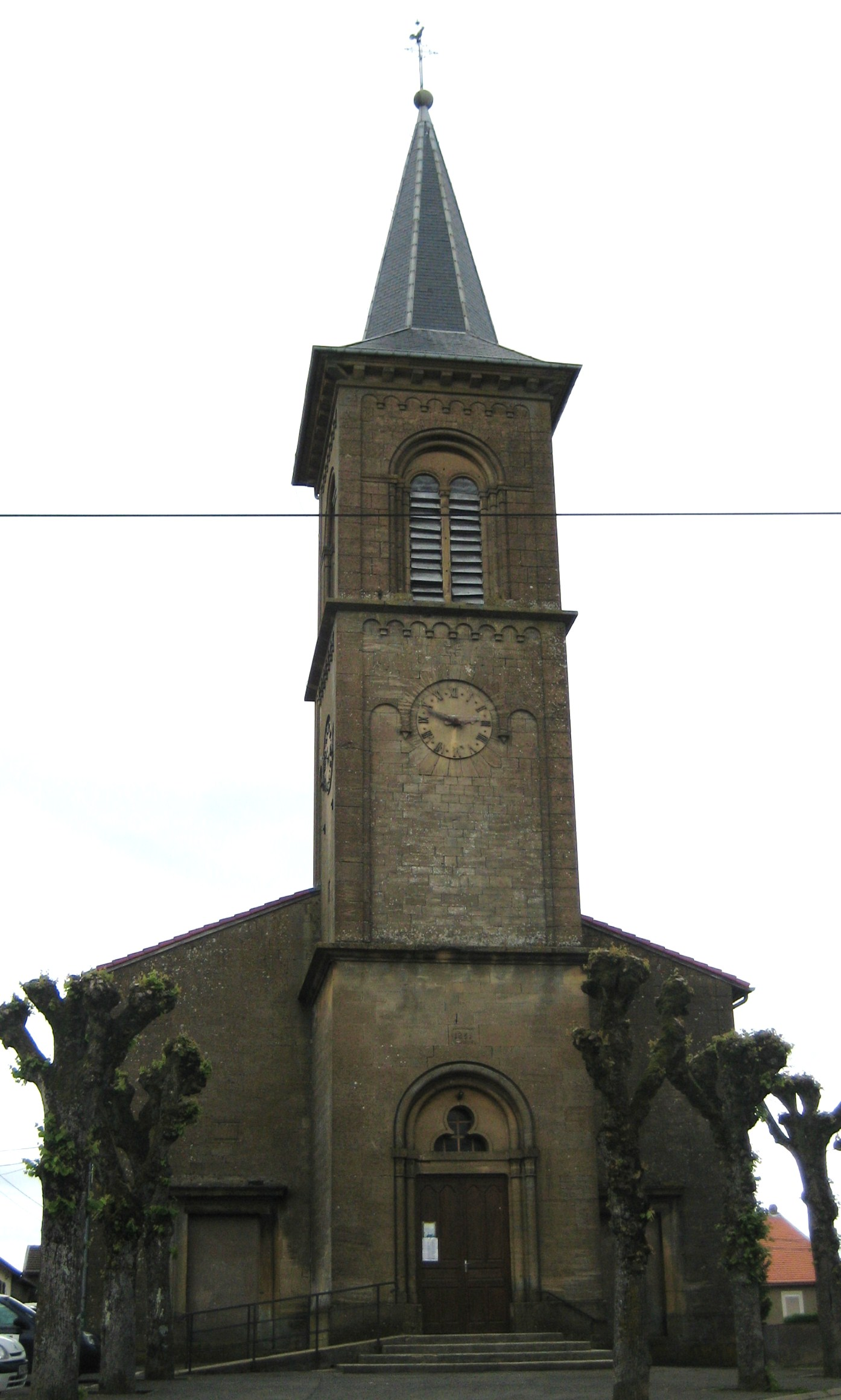
- The church in Trieux

- Coat of arms
- Location of Trieux
- Location within France Location within Grand Est
- Coordinates: 49°19′31″N 5°56′14″E
- Country: France
- Region: Grand Est
- Department: Meurthe-et-Moselle
- Arrondissement: Val-de-Briey
- Canton: Pays de Briey
- Intercommunality: CC Cœur du Pays-Haut

Government
  - Mayor (2020–2026): Jean-Claude Kociak
- Area^{1}: 8.62 km^{2} (3.33 sq mi)
- Highest elevation: 320 m (1,050 ft)
- Lowest elevation: 245 m (804 ft)
- Population (2023): 2,753
  - Density: 319/km^{2} (827/sq mi)
- Time zone: UTC+01:00 (CET)
  - Summer (DST): UTC+02:00 (CEST)
- INSEE/Postal code: 54533 /54750
- ^{1} French Land Register data, which excludes lakes, ponds, glaciers > 1 km^{2} (0.386 sq mi or 247 acres) and river estuaries.

Trieux (French pronunciation: [tʁijø]) is a commune in the Meurthe-et-Moselle department in north-eastern France.

== Population ==
Historical population
| Year | Pop. | ±% p.a. |
|---|---|---|
| 1968 | 2,697 | — |
| 1975 | 2,283 | −2.35% |
| 1982 | 2,030 | −1.66% |
| 1990 | 1,859 | −1.09% |
| 1999 | 1,853 | −0.04% |
| 2007 | 1,975 | +0.80% |
| 2012 | 2,317 | +3.25% |
| 2017 | 2,557 | +1.99% |
| 2023 | 2,753 | +1.24% |
Source: INSEE

== See also ==
- Communes of the Meurthe-et-Moselle department
