= Norroy-le-Sec =

- Commune
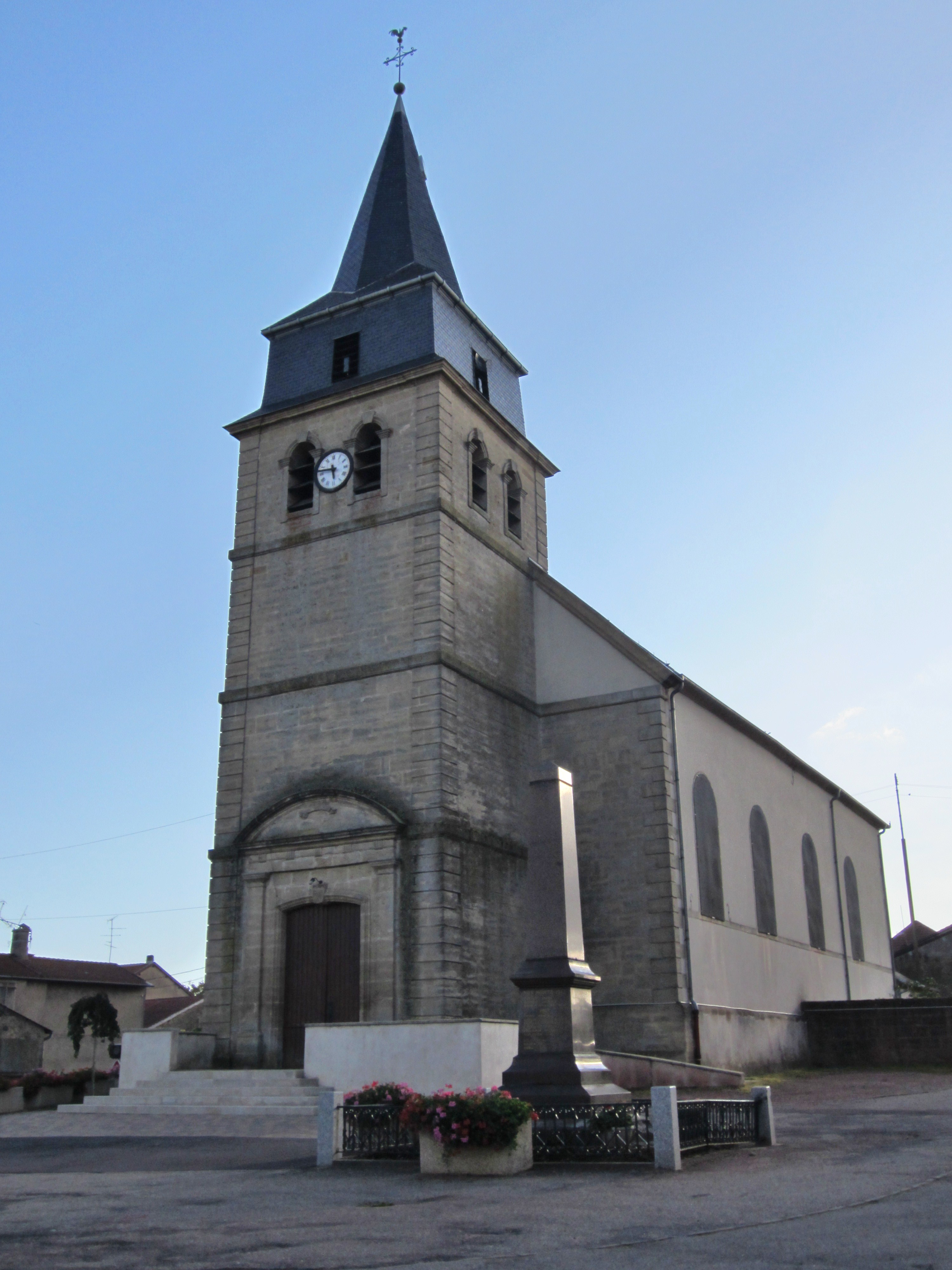
- The church in Norroy-le-Sec

- Coat of arms
- Location of Norroy-le-Sec
- Location within France Location within Grand Est
- Coordinates: 49°16′51″N 5°48′42″E
- Country: France
- Region: Grand Est
- Department: Meurthe-et-Moselle
- Arrondissement: Val-de-Briey
- Canton: Pays de Briey
- Intercommunality: Orne Lorraine Confluences

Government
  - Mayor (2020–2026): Charles-Paul Peyrot
- Area^{1}: 13.77 km^{2} (5.32 sq mi)
- Elevation: 312 m (1,024 ft)
- Highest elevation: 312 m (1,024 ft)
- Lowest elevation: 250 m (820 ft)
- Population (2023): 431
  - Density: 31.3/km^{2} (81.1/sq mi)
- Time zone: UTC+01:00 (CET)
  - Summer (DST): UTC+02:00 (CEST)
- INSEE/Postal code: 54402 /54150
- ^{1} French Land Register data, which excludes lakes, ponds, glaciers > 1 km^{2} (0.386 sq mi or 247 acres) and river estuaries.

Norroy-le-Sec (French pronunciation: [nɔʁwa lə sɛk]) is a commune in the Meurthe-et-Moselle department in north-eastern France.

== See also ==
- Communes of the Meurthe-et-Moselle department
