= Domprix =

- Commune
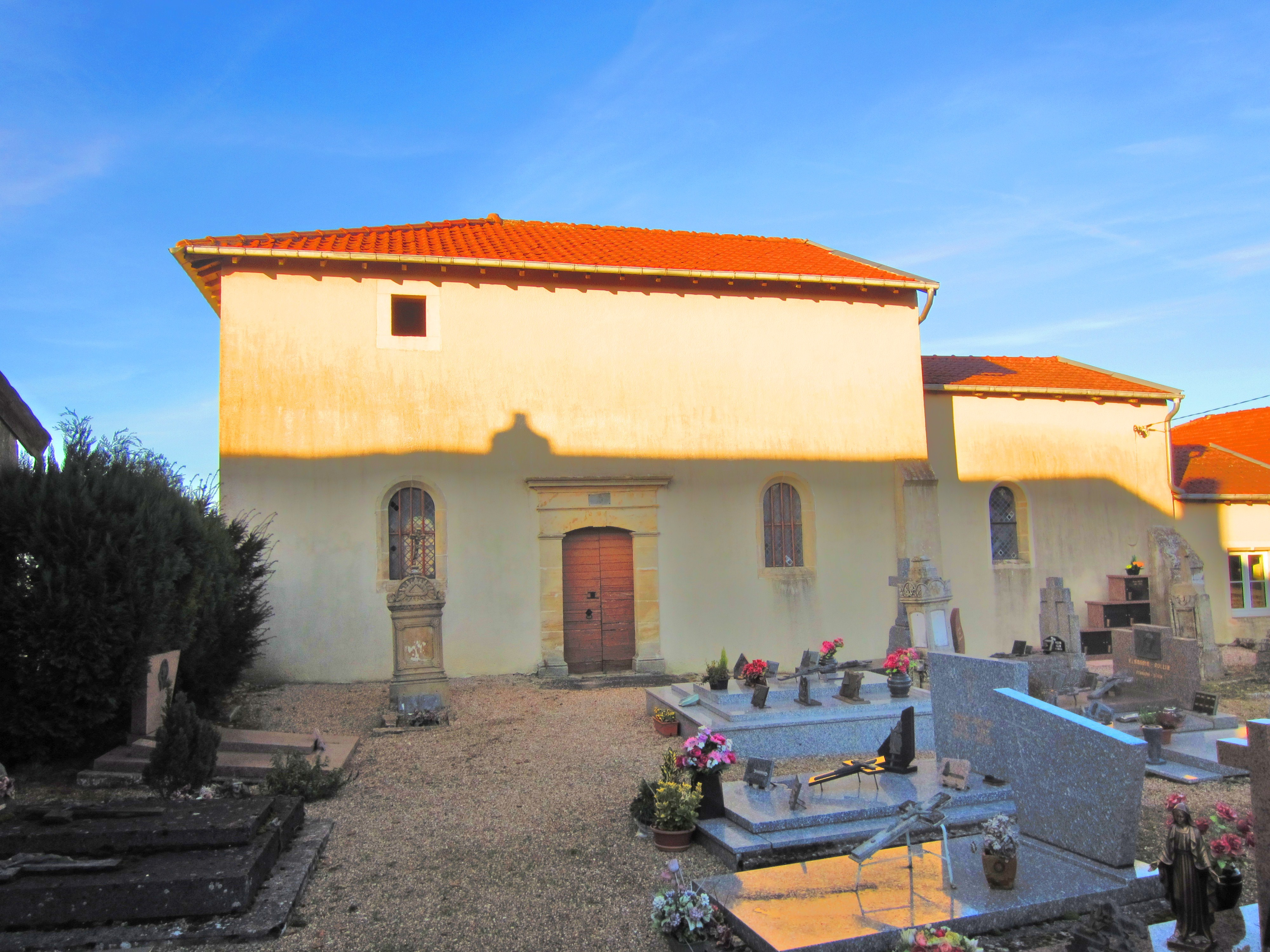
- The church in Domprix

- Coat of arms
- Location of Domprix
- Location within France Location within Grand Est
- Coordinates: 49°19′54″N 5°45′32″E
- Country: France
- Region: Grand Est
- Department: Meurthe-et-Moselle
- Arrondissement: Val-de-Briey
- Canton: Pays de Briey
- Intercommunality: CC Cœur du Pays-Haut

Government
  - Mayor (2020–2026): Philippe Fischesser
- Area^{1}: 7.7 km^{2} (3.0 sq mi)
- Elevation: 317 m (1,040 ft)
- Highest elevation: 327 m (1,073 ft)
- Lowest elevation: 270 m (890 ft)
- Population (2023): 97
  - Density: 13/km^{2} (33/sq mi)
- Time zone: UTC+01:00 (CET)
  - Summer (DST): UTC+02:00 (CEST)
- INSEE/Postal code: 54169 /54490
- ^{1} French Land Register data, which excludes lakes, ponds, glaciers > 1 km^{2} (0.386 sq mi or 247 acres) and river estuaries.

Domprix (French pronunciation: [dɔ̃pʁi]) is a commune in the Meurthe-et-Moselle department in north-eastern France.

The town of Bertrameix merged with Domprix on 29 January 1812.

== See also ==
- Communes of the Meurthe-et-Moselle department
