= Malavillers =

- Commune
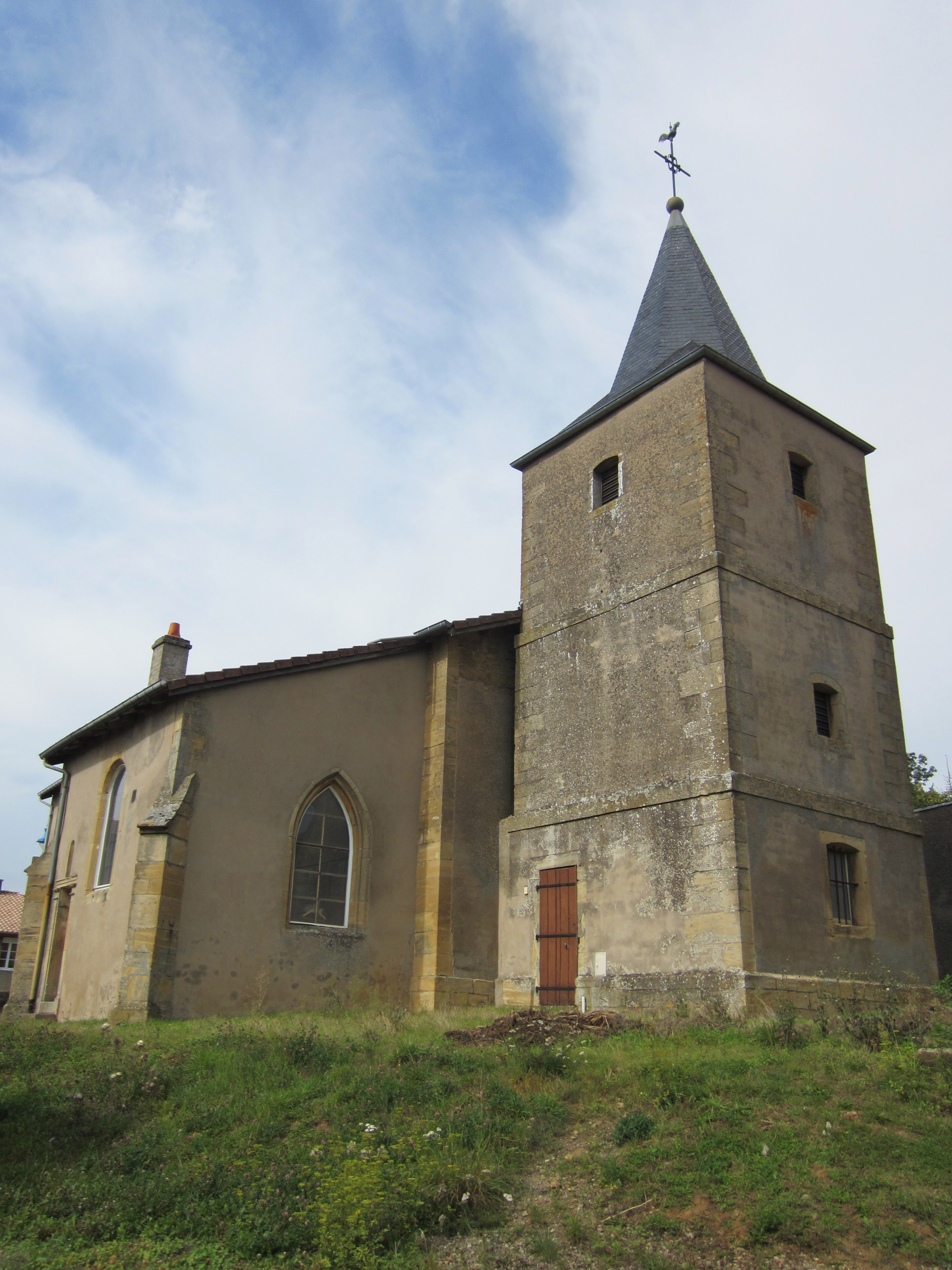
- The church in Malavillers

- Coat of arms
- Location of Malavillers
- Location within France Location within Grand Est
- Coordinates: 49°21′25″N 5°52′13″E
- Country: France
- Region: Grand Est
- Department: Meurthe-et-Moselle
- Arrondissement: Val-de-Briey
- Canton: Pays de Briey
- Intercommunality: Cœur du Pays-Haut

Government
  - Mayor (2020–2026): Jean-Michel Thil
- Area^{1}: 4.37 km^{2} (1.69 sq mi)
- Elevation: 385 m (1,263 ft)
- Highest elevation: 379 m (1,243 ft)
- Lowest elevation: 313 m (1,027 ft)
- Population (2023): 122
  - Density: 27.9/km^{2} (72.3/sq mi)
- Time zone: UTC+01:00 (CET)
  - Summer (DST): UTC+02:00 (CEST)
- INSEE/Postal code: 54337 /54560
- ^{1} French Land Register data, which excludes lakes, ponds, glaciers > 1 km^{2} (0.386 sq mi or 247 acres) and river estuaries.

Malavillers is a commune in the Meurthe-et-Moselle department in north-eastern France.

== See also ==
- Communes of the Meurthe-et-Moselle department
