= Murville =

- Commune
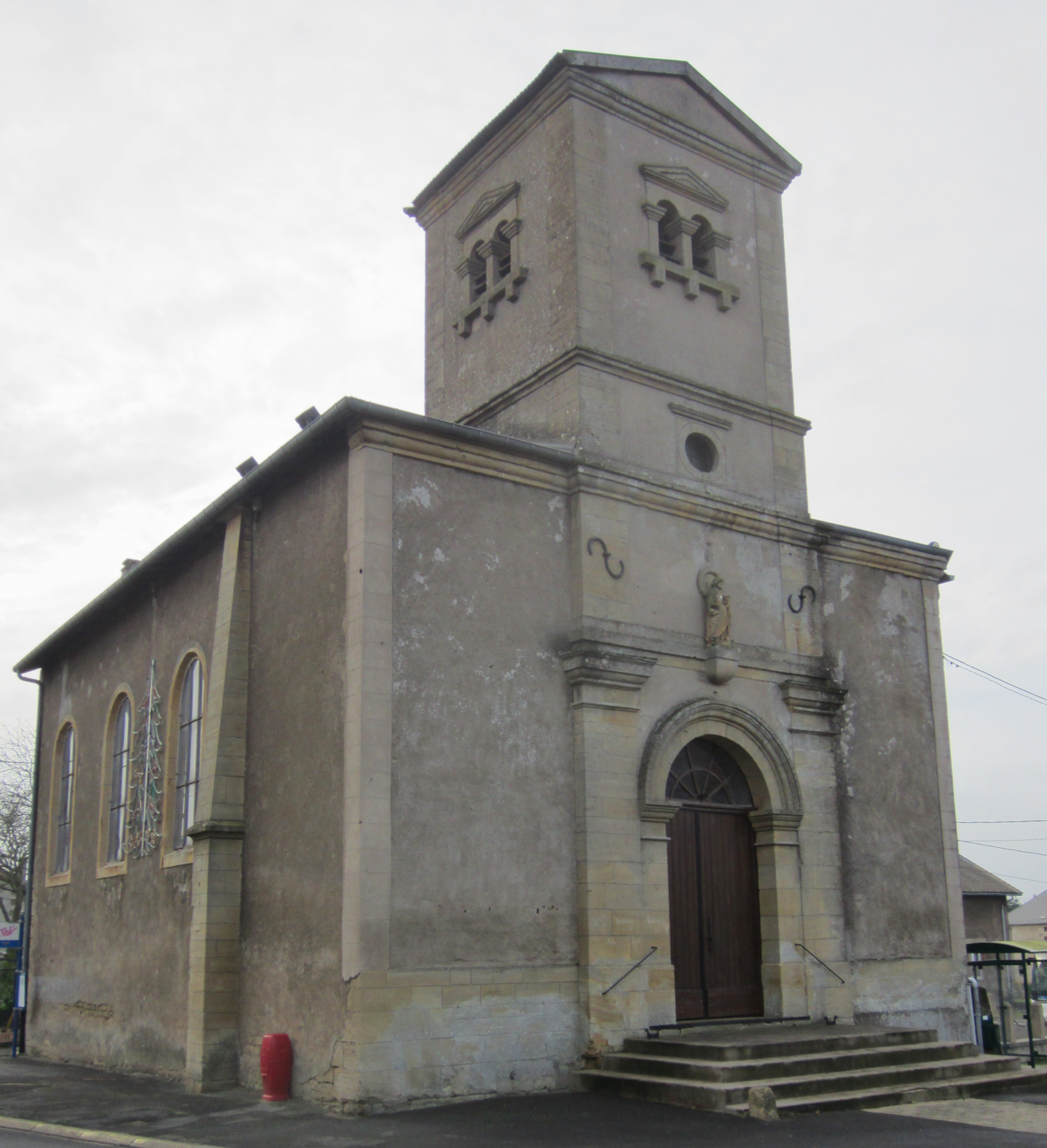
- The church in Murville

- Coat of arms
- Location of Murville
- Location within France Location within Grand Est
- Coordinates: 49°20′20″N 5°49′36″E
- Country: France
- Region: Grand Est
- Department: Meurthe-et-Moselle
- Arrondissement: Val-de-Briey
- Canton: Pays de Briey
- Intercommunality: Cœur du Pays-Haut

Government
  - Mayor (2020–2026): René Michelet
- Area^{1}: 5.57 km^{2} (2.15 sq mi)
- Elevation: 330 m (1,080 ft)
- Highest elevation: 366 m (1,201 ft)
- Lowest elevation: 305 m (1,001 ft)
- Population (2023): 239
  - Density: 42.9/km^{2} (111/sq mi)
- Time zone: UTC+01:00 (CET)
  - Summer (DST): UTC+02:00 (CEST)
- INSEE/Postal code: 54394 /54490
- ^{1} French Land Register data, which excludes lakes, ponds, glaciers > 1 km^{2} (0.386 sq mi or 247 acres) and river estuaries.

Murville (French pronunciation: [myʁvil]) is a commune in the Meurthe-et-Moselle department in north-eastern France.

== See also ==
- Communes of the Meurthe-et-Moselle department
