= Joudreville =

- Commune
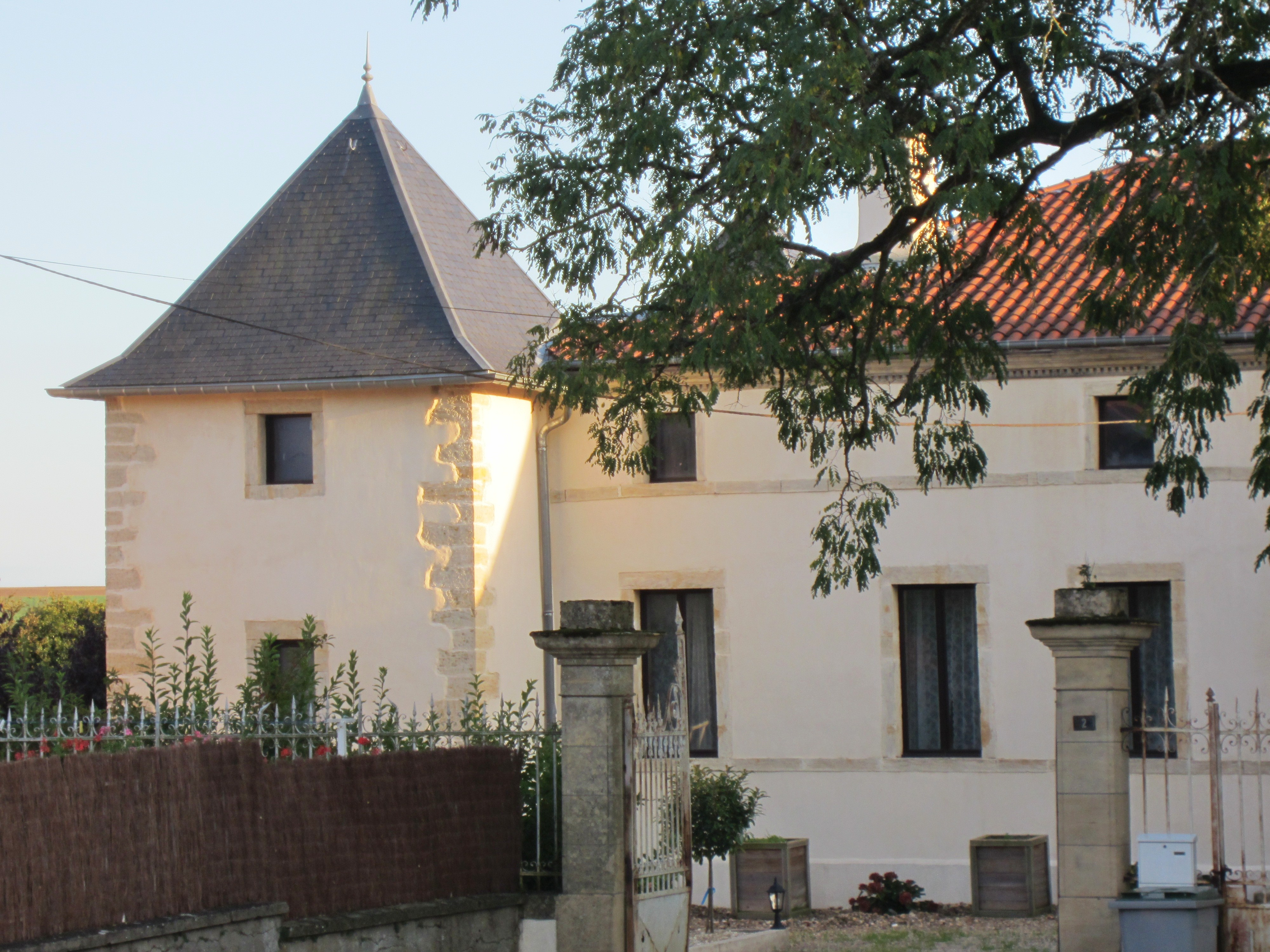
- The chateau in Joudreville

- Coat of arms
- Location of Joudreville
- Location within France Location within Grand Est
- Coordinates: 49°17′11″N 5°46′41″E
- Country: France
- Region: Grand Est
- Department: Meurthe-et-Moselle
- Arrondissement: Val-de-Briey
- Canton: Pays de Briey
- Intercommunality: CC Cœur du Pays-Haut

Government
  - Mayor (2020–2026): Jean-Marc Léon
- Area^{1}: 5.58 km^{2} (2.15 sq mi)
- Elevation: 275 m (902 ft)
- Highest elevation: 312 m (1,024 ft)
- Lowest elevation: 251 m (823 ft)
- Population (2023): 1,101
  - Density: 197/km^{2} (511/sq mi)
- Time zone: UTC+01:00 (CET)
  - Summer (DST): UTC+02:00 (CEST)
- INSEE/Postal code: 54284 /54490
- ^{1} French Land Register data, which excludes lakes, ponds, glaciers > 1 km^{2} (0.386 sq mi or 247 acres) and river estuaries.

Joudreville (French pronunciation: [ʒudʁəvil]) is a commune in the Meurthe-et-Moselle department in north-eastern France.

== See also ==
- Communes of the Meurthe-et-Moselle department
