= Bettainvillers =

- Commune
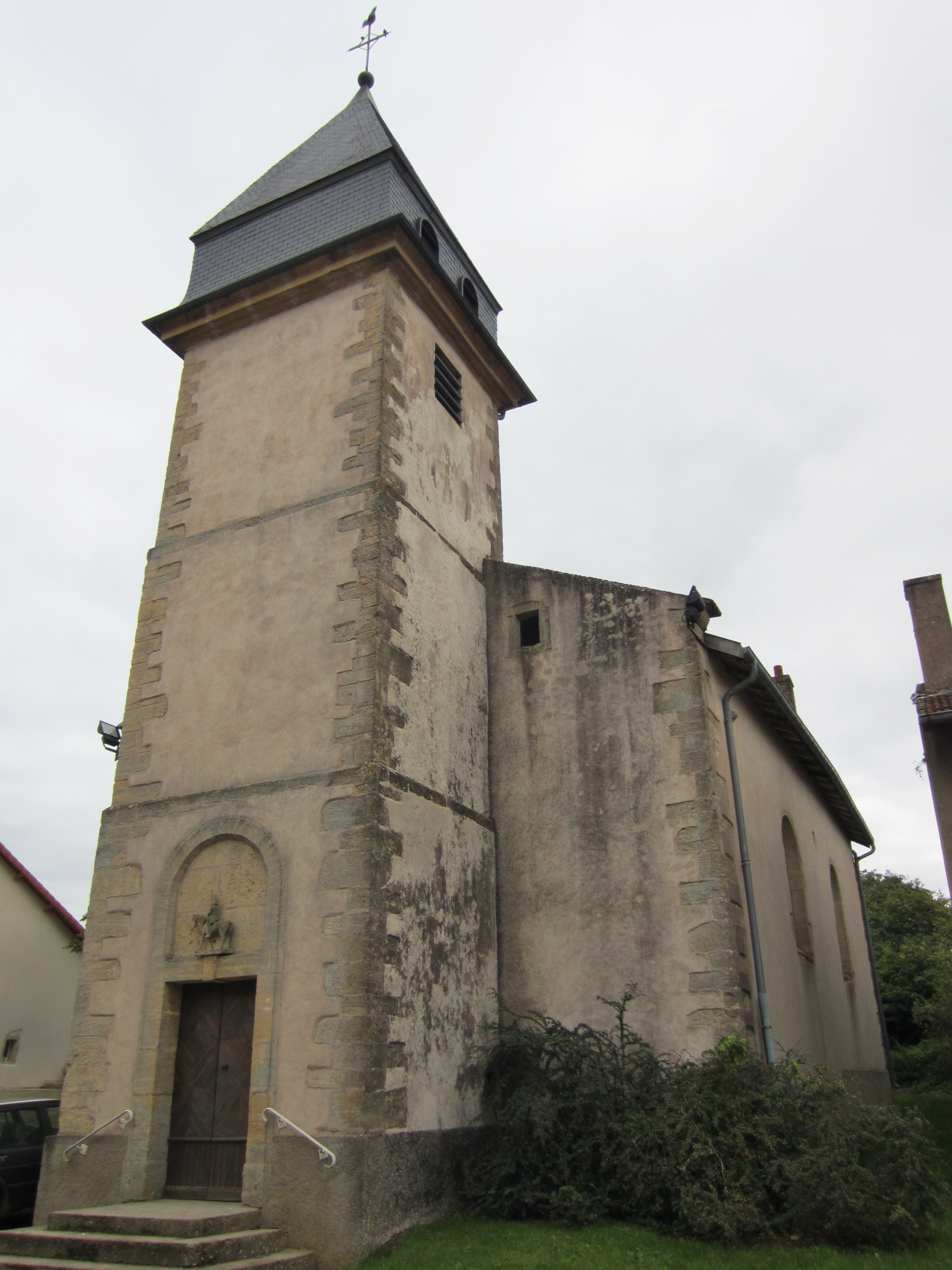
- Parish church of Saint Maurice Bettainvillers

- Coat of arms
- Location of Bettainvillers
- Location within France Location within Grand Est
- Coordinates: 49°18′03″N 5°54′20″E
- Country: France
- Region: Grand Est
- Department: Meurthe-et-Moselle
- Arrondissement: Val-de-Briey
- Canton: Pays de Briey
- Intercommunality: Orne Lorraine Confluences

Government
  - Mayor (2020–2026): Hervé Lherbeil
- Area^{1}: 4.53 km^{2} (1.75 sq mi)
- Elevation: 297 m (974 ft)
- Highest elevation: 293 m (961 ft)
- Lowest elevation: 228 m (748 ft)
- Population (2023): 374
  - Density: 82.6/km^{2} (214/sq mi)
- Time zone: UTC+01:00 (CET)
  - Summer (DST): UTC+02:00 (CEST)
- INSEE/Postal code: 54066 /54640
- ^{1} French Land Register data, which excludes lakes, ponds, glaciers > 1 km^{2} (0.386 sq mi or 247 acres) and river estuaries.

Bettainvillers is a commune in the Meurthe-et-Moselle department in northeastern France.

== Population ==
Historical population
Year	Pop.	±% p.a.
1968	209	—
1975	184	−1.80%
1982	187	+0.23%
1990	156	−2.24%
1999	155	−0.07%
2007	199	+3.17%
2012	309	+9.20%
2017	391	+4.82%
2023	374	−0.74%
Source: INSEE

== See also ==
- Communes of the Meurthe-et-Moselle department
