= Preutin-Higny =

- Commune
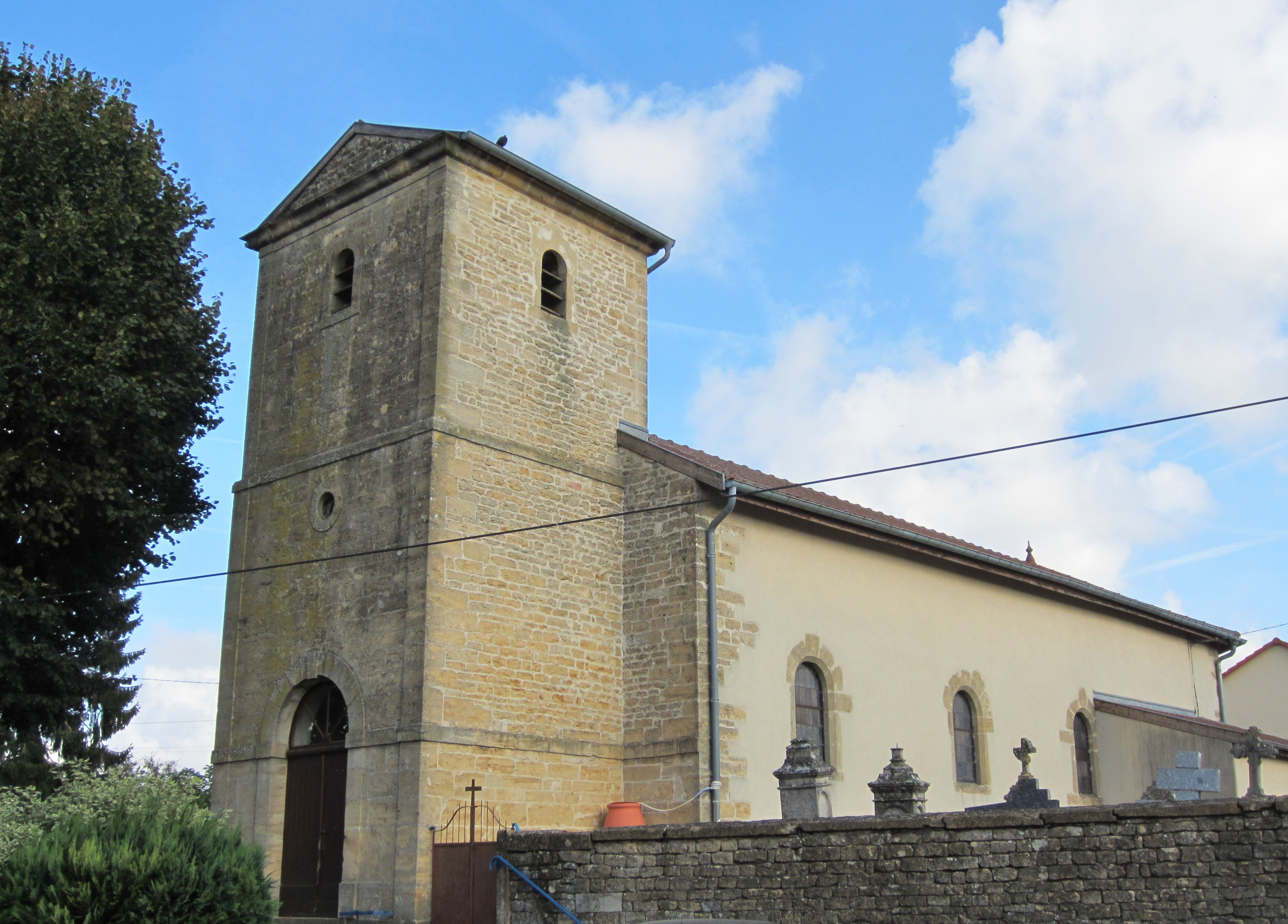
- The church in Higny

- Coat of arms
- Location of Preutin-Higny
- Location within France Location within Grand Est
- Coordinates: 49°20′40″N 5°47′29″E
- Country: France
- Region: Grand Est
- Department: Meurthe-et-Moselle
- Arrondissement: Val-de-Briey
- Canton: Pays de Briey
- Intercommunality: Cœur du Pays-Haut

Government
  - Mayor (2020–2026): Daniel Grosse
- Area^{1}: 7.02 km^{2} (2.71 sq mi)
- Elevation: 340 m (1,120 ft)
- Highest elevation: 367 m (1,204 ft)
- Lowest elevation: 272 m (892 ft)
- Population (2023): 160
  - Density: 23/km^{2} (59/sq mi)
- Time zone: UTC+01:00 (CET)
  - Summer (DST): UTC+02:00 (CEST)
- INSEE/Postal code: 54436 /54490
- ^{1} French Land Register data, which excludes lakes, ponds, glaciers > 1 km^{2} (0.386 sq mi or 247 acres) and river estuaries.

Preutin-Higny is a commune in the Meurthe-et-Moselle department in north-eastern France.

== See also ==
- Communes of the Meurthe-et-Moselle department
