= Jœuf =

- Commune
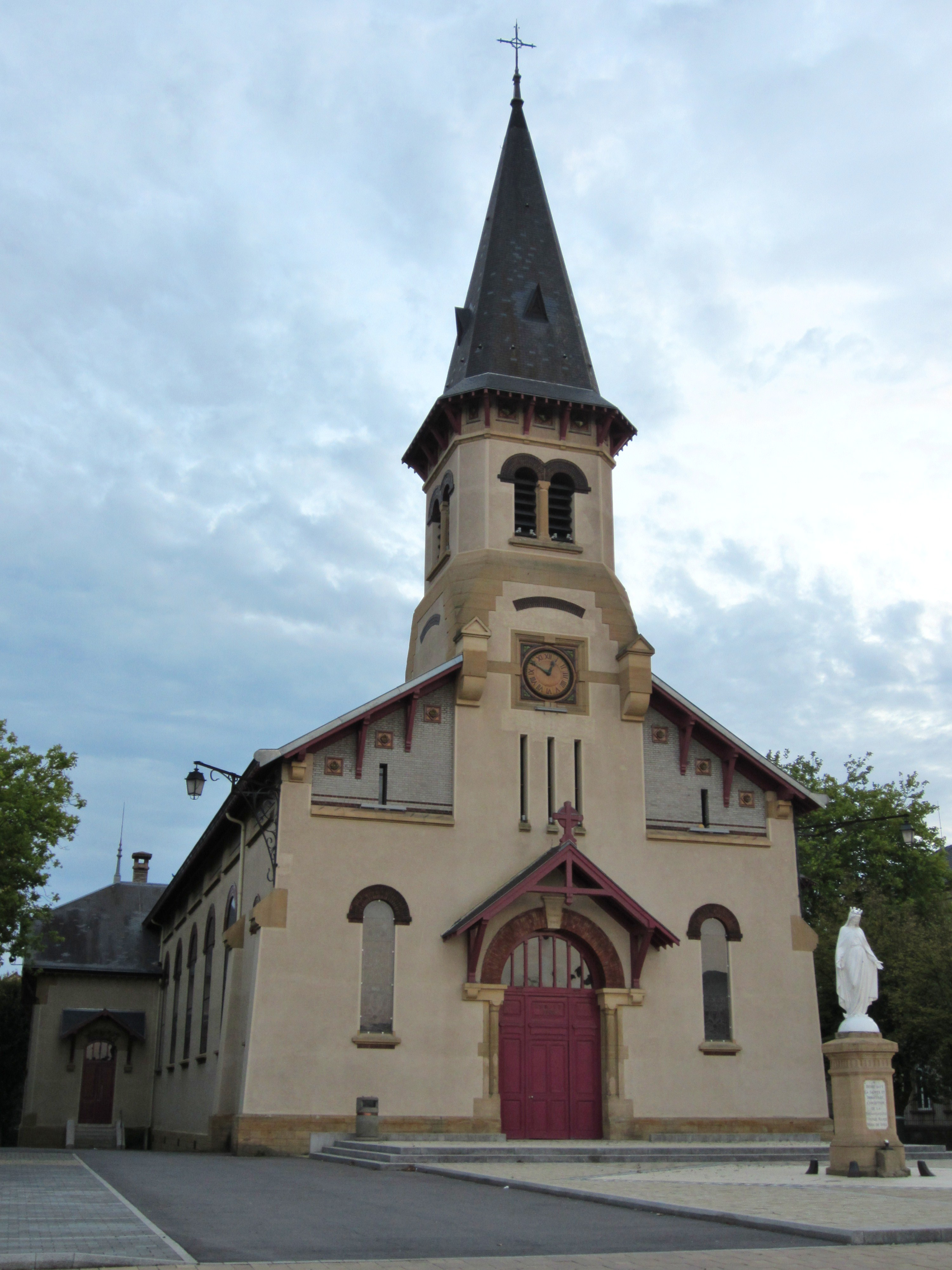
- The church in Jœuf

- Coat of arms
- Location of Jœuf
- Location within France Location within Grand Est
- Coordinates: 49°13′50″N 6°00′35″E
- Country: France
- Region: Grand Est
- Department: Meurthe-et-Moselle
- Arrondissement: Val-de-Briey
- Canton: Pays de Briey

Government
  - Mayor (2020–2026): André Corzani
- Area^{1}: 3.18 km^{2} (1.23 sq mi)
- Elevation: 180 m (590 ft)
- Highest elevation: 287 m (942 ft)
- Lowest elevation: 173 m (568 ft)
- Population (2023): 6,392
  - Density: 2,010/km^{2} (5,210/sq mi)
- Time zone: UTC+01:00 (CET)
  - Summer (DST): UTC+02:00 (CEST)
- INSEE/Postal code: 54280 /54240
- ^{1} French Land Register data, which excludes lakes, ponds, glaciers > 1 km^{2} (0.386 sq mi or 247 acres) and river estuaries.

Jœuf (French pronunciation: [ʒœf]) is a commune in the Meurthe-et-Moselle department in north-eastern France.

== Population ==
Historical population
Year	Pop.	±% p.a.
1968	12,305	—
1975	10,649	−2.04%
1982	9,016	−2.35%
1990	7,875	−1.68%
1999	7,453	−0.61%
2007	6,993	−0.79%
2012	6,712	−0.82%
2017	6,549	−0.49%
2023	6,392	−0.40%
Source: INSEE

== People ==
It is the birthplace of:

- Michel Platini, football player
- Éric Occansey, basketball player

== See also ==
- Communes of the Meurthe-et-Moselle department
