= Mont-Bonvillers =

- Commune
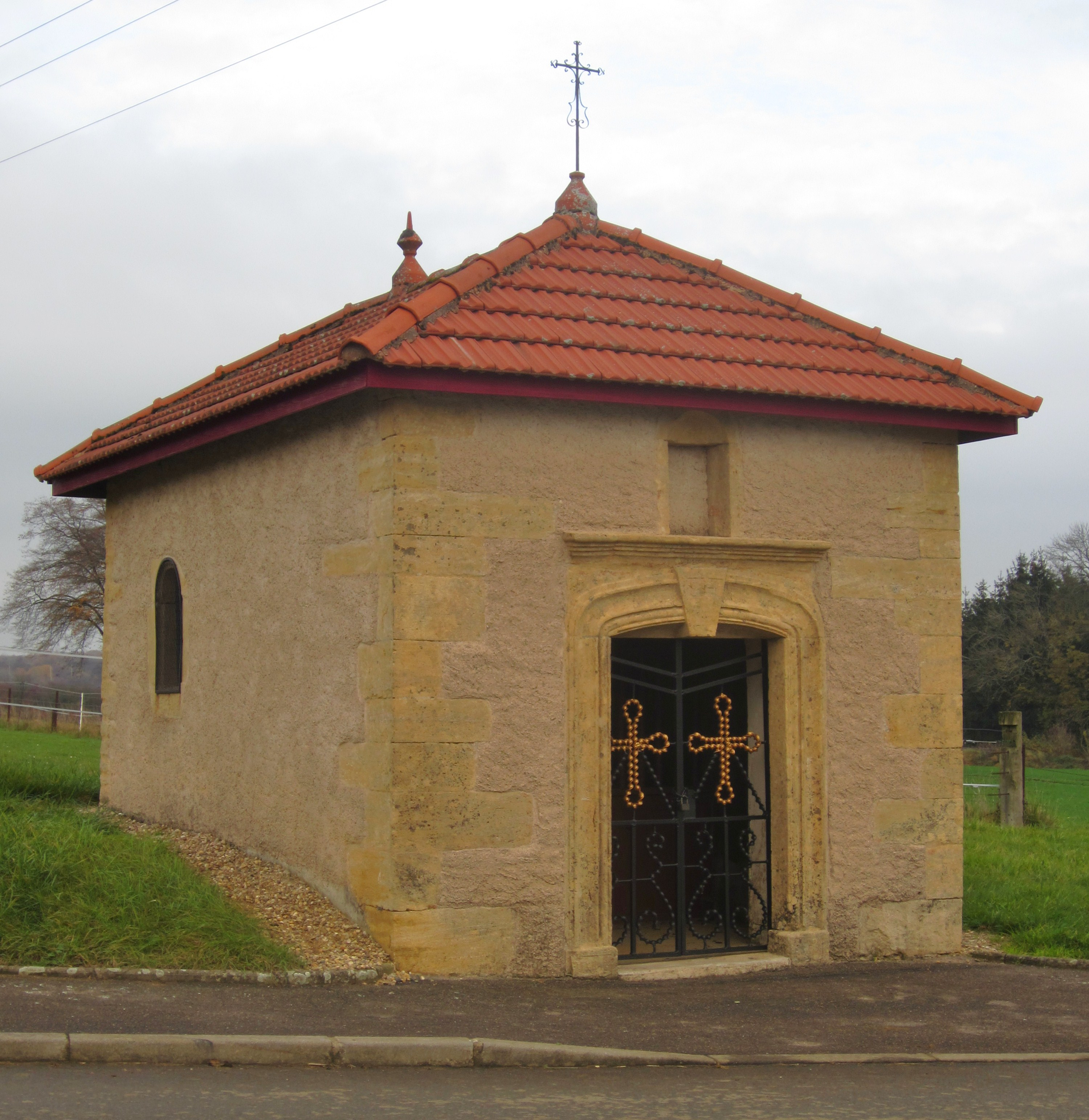
- The chapel in Mont-Bonvillers

- Coat of arms
- Location of Mont-Bonvillers
- Location within France Location within Grand Est
- Coordinates: 49°19′39″N 5°50′09″E
- Country: France
- Region: Grand Est
- Department: Meurthe-et-Moselle
- Arrondissement: Val-de-Briey
- Canton: Pays de Briey
- Intercommunality: Cœur du Pays-Haut

Government
  - Mayor (2020–2026): Robert Clesse
- Area^{1}: 7.44 km^{2} (2.87 sq mi)
- Elevation: 325 m (1,066 ft)
- Highest elevation: 361 m (1,184 ft)
- Lowest elevation: 270 m (890 ft)
- Population (2023): 965
  - Density: 130/km^{2} (336/sq mi)
- Time zone: UTC+01:00 (CET)
  - Summer (DST): UTC+02:00 (CEST)
- INSEE/Postal code: 54084 /54111
- ^{1} French Land Register data, which excludes lakes, ponds, glaciers > 1 km^{2} (0.386 sq mi or 247 acres) and river estuaries.

Mont-Bonvillers (French pronunciation: [mɔ̃ bɔ̃vile]) is a commune in the Meurthe-et-Moselle department in north-eastern France.

== Population ==
Historical population
Year	Pop.	±% p.a.
1968	1,064	—
1975	1,241	+2.22%
1982	1,081	−1.95%
1990	1,010	−0.85%
1999	955	−0.62%
2007	977	+0.29%
2012	995	+0.37%
2017	948	−0.96%
2023	965	+0.30%
Source: INSEE

== See also ==
- Communes of the Meurthe-et-Moselle department
