= Sancy, Meurthe-et-Moselle =

Sancy
- Commune
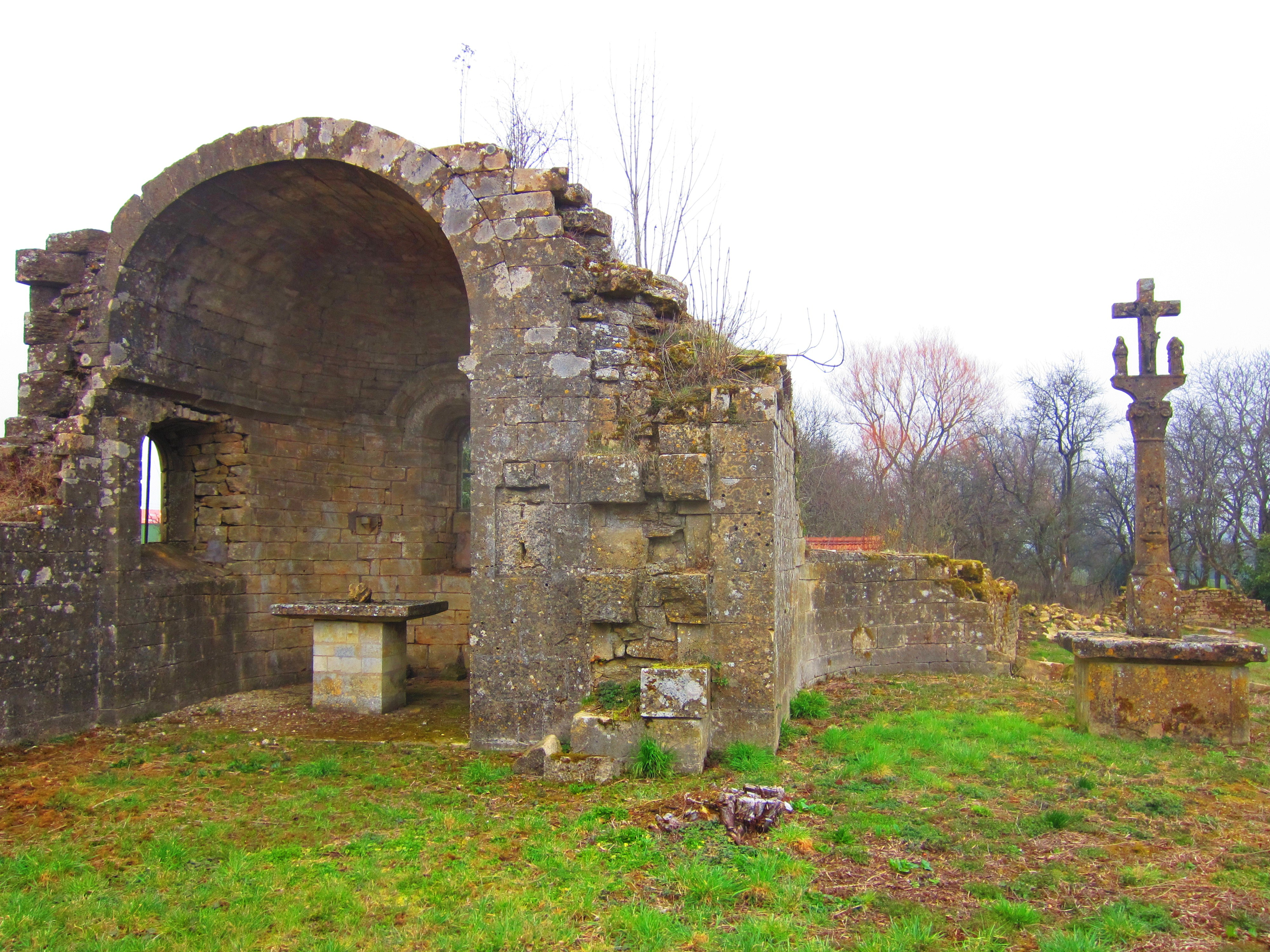
- The ruins of the priory in Sancy

- Coat of arms
- Location of Sancy
- Location within France Location within Grand Est
- Coordinates: 49°20′54″N 5°55′33″E
- Country: France
- Region: Grand Est
- Department: Meurthe-et-Moselle
- Arrondissement: Val-de-Briey
- Canton: Pays de Briey
- Intercommunality: Cœur du Pays-Haut

Government
  - Mayor (2020–2026): Daniel Matergia
- Area^{1}: 13.19 km^{2} (5.09 sq mi)
- Elevation: 340 m (1,120 ft)
- Highest elevation: 358 m (1,175 ft)
- Lowest elevation: 254 m (833 ft)
- Population (2023): 365
  - Density: 27.7/km^{2} (71.7/sq mi)
- Time zone: UTC+01:00 (CET)
  - Summer (DST): UTC+02:00 (CEST)
- INSEE/Postal code: 54491 /54560
- ^{1} French Land Register data, which excludes lakes, ponds, glaciers > 1 km^{2} (0.386 sq mi or 247 acres) and river estuaries.

Sancy (French pronunciation: [sɑ̃si]; Lorraine Franconian Senzech) is a commune in the Meurthe-et-Moselle department in north-eastern France.

== See also ==
- Communes of the Meurthe-et-Moselle department
