= Mercy-le-Bas =

- Commune
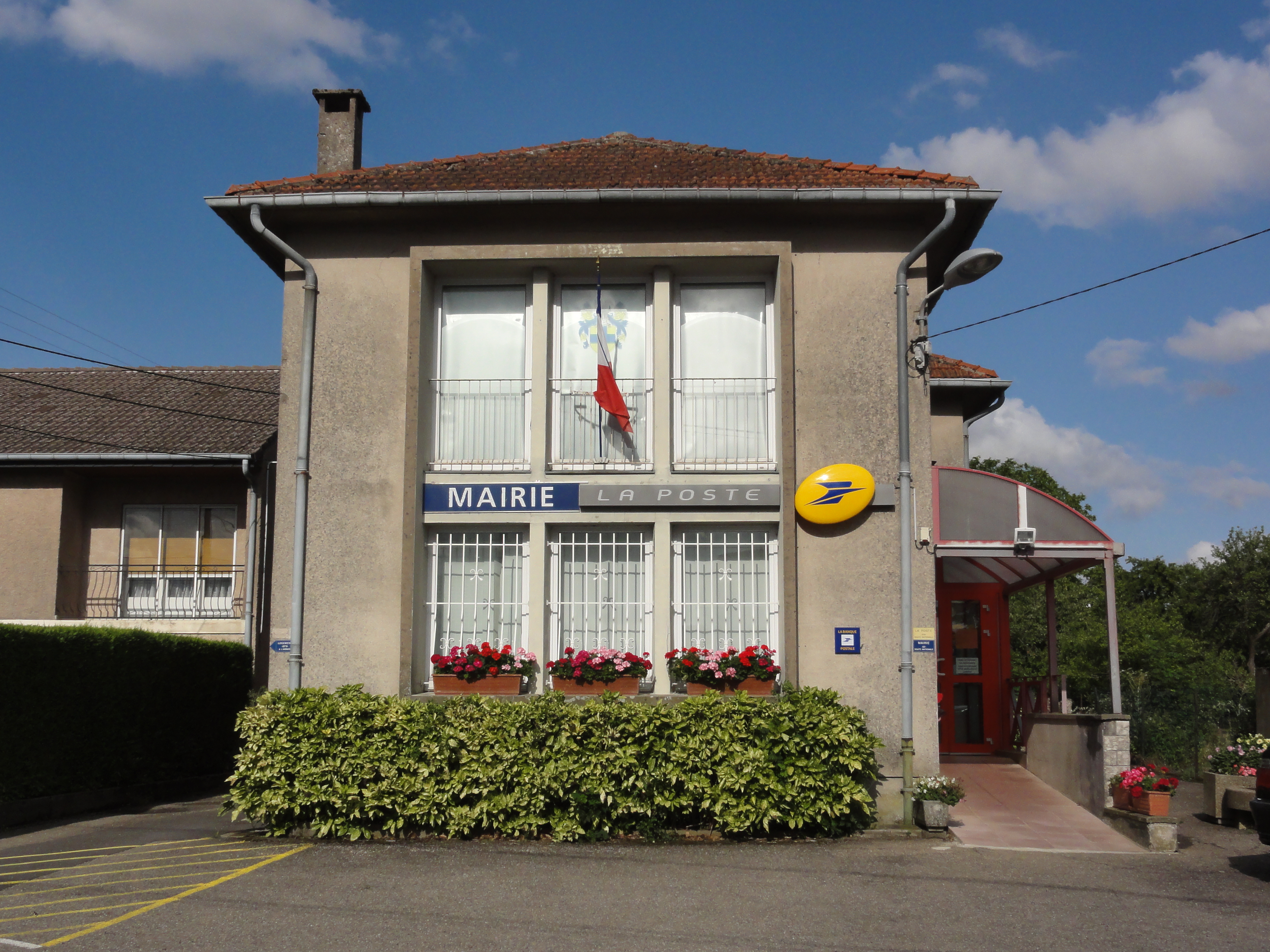
- The town hall and post office in Mercy-le-Bas

- Coat of arms
- Location of Mercy-le-Bas
- Location within France Location within Grand Est
- Coordinates: 49°23′04″N 5°45′09″E
- Country: France
- Region: Grand Est
- Department: Meurthe-et-Moselle
- Arrondissement: Val-de-Briey
- Canton: Pays de Briey
- Intercommunality: CC Cœur du Pays-Haut

Government
  - Mayor (2020–2026): Serge Ventrucci
- Area^{1}: 8.23 km^{2} (3.18 sq mi)
- Elevation: 293 m (961 ft)
- Highest elevation: 318 m (1,043 ft)
- Lowest elevation: 242 m (794 ft)
- Population (2023): 1,273
  - Density: 155/km^{2} (401/sq mi)
- Time zone: UTC+01:00 (CET)
  - Summer (DST): UTC+02:00 (CEST)
- INSEE/Postal code: 54362 /54960
- ^{1} French Land Register data, which excludes lakes, ponds, glaciers > 1 km^{2} (0.386 sq mi or 247 acres) and river estuaries.

Mercy-le-Bas (French pronunciation: [mɛʁsi lə ba]) is a commune in the Meurthe-et-Moselle department in north-eastern France.

== See also ==
- Communes of the Meurthe-et-Moselle department
