= Xivry-Circourt =

- Commune
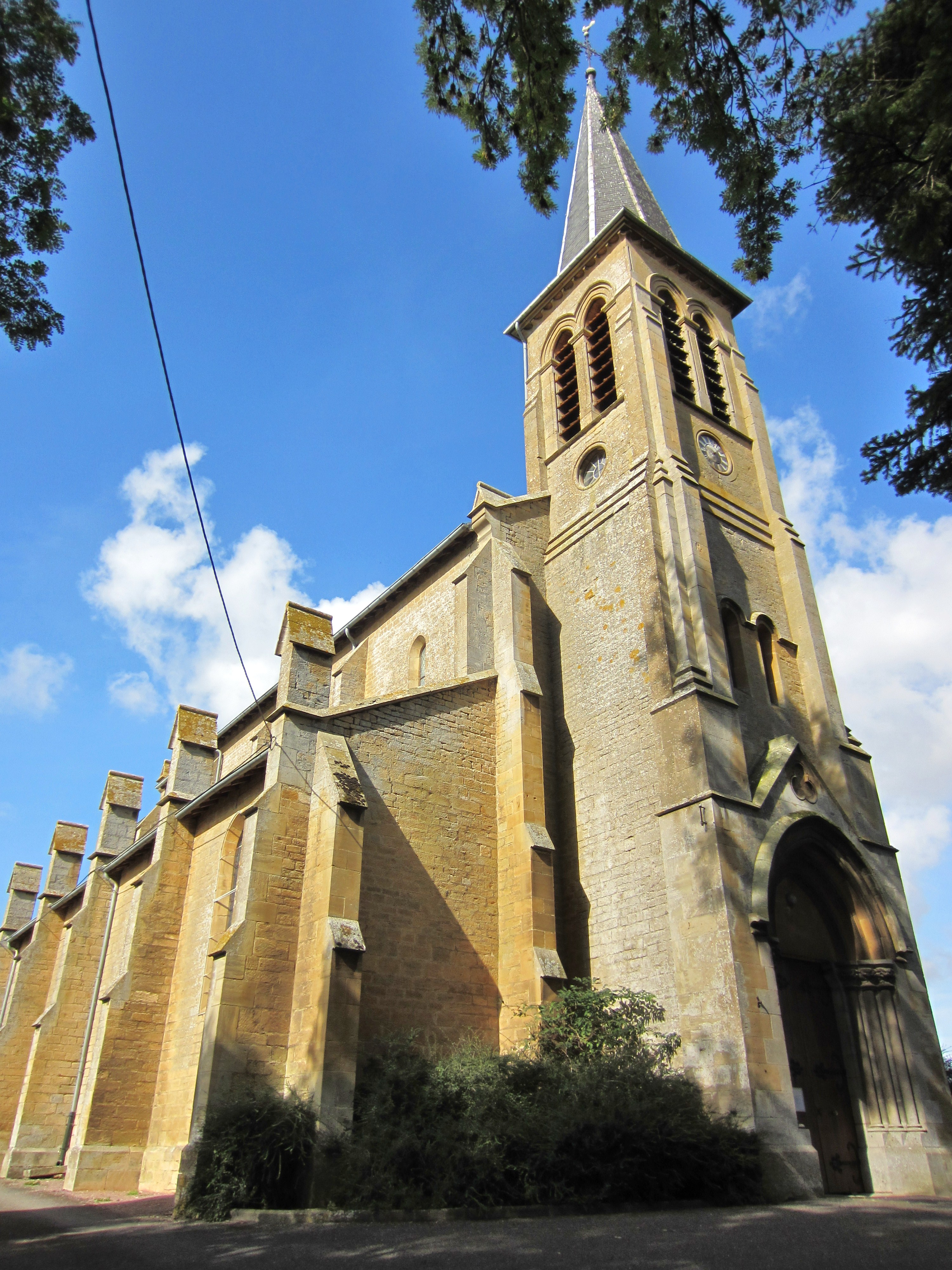
- The church in Xivry-Circourt

- Coat of arms
- Location of Xivry-Circourt
- Location within France Location within Grand Est
- Coordinates: 49°21′20″N 5°46′04″E
- Country: France
- Region: Grand Est
- Department: Meurthe-et-Moselle
- Arrondissement: Val-de-Briey
- Canton: Pays de Briey
- Intercommunality: Cœur du Pays-Haut

Government
  - Mayor (2020–2026): Hervé Schneider
- Area^{1}: 12.04 km^{2} (4.65 sq mi)
- Elevation: 275 m (902 ft)
- Highest elevation: 333 m (1,093 ft)
- Lowest elevation: 259 m (850 ft)
- Population (2023): 266
  - Density: 22.1/km^{2} (57.2/sq mi)
- Time zone: UTC+01:00 (CET)
  - Summer (DST): UTC+02:00 (CEST)
- INSEE/Postal code: 54598 /54490
- ^{1} French Land Register data, which excludes lakes, ponds, glaciers > 1 km^{2} (0.386 sq mi or 247 acres) and river estuaries.

Xivry-Circourt is a commune in the Meurthe-et-Moselle department in north-eastern France.

== Population ==
Historical population
Year	Pop.	±% p.a.
1968	354	—
1975	325	−1.21%
1982	300	−1.14%
1990	278	−0.95%
1999	296	+0.70%
2007	268	−1.23%
2012	278	+0.74%
2017	272	−0.44%
2023	266	−0.37%
Source: INSEE

== See also ==
- Communes of the Meurthe-et-Moselle department
