= Les Baroches =

- Commune
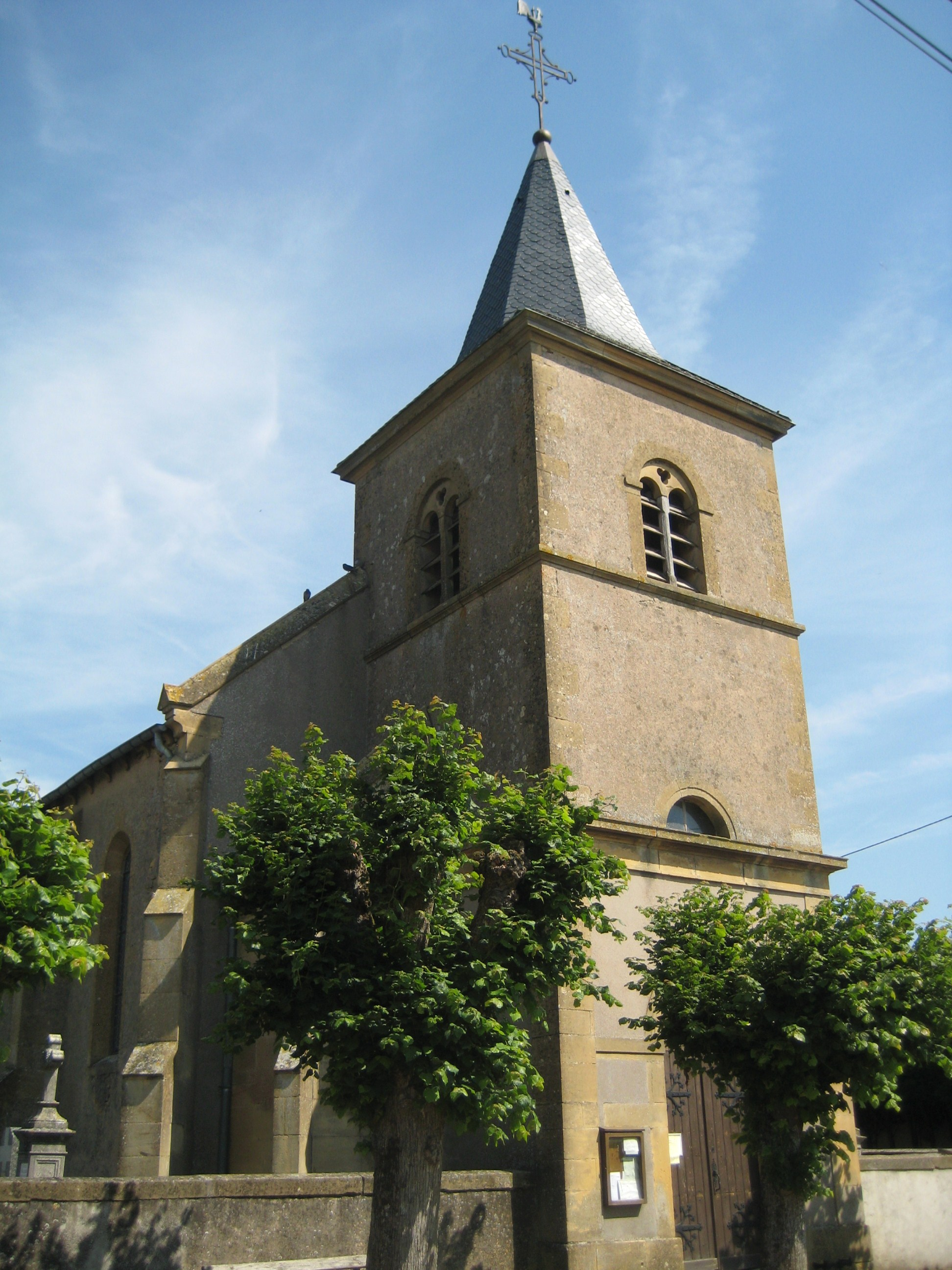
- The church in Les Baroches

- Coat of arms
- Location of Les Baroches
- Location within France Location within Grand Est
- Coordinates: 49°13′50″N 5°53′34″E
- Country: France
- Region: Grand Est
- Department: Meurthe-et-Moselle
- Arrondissement: Val-de-Briey
- Canton: Pays de Briey

Government
  - Mayor (2020–2026): Christine Bauchez
- Area^{1}: 13.28 km^{2} (5.13 sq mi)
- Elevation: 230 m (750 ft)
- Highest elevation: 253 m (830 ft)
- Lowest elevation: 192 m (630 ft)
- Population (2023): 325
  - Density: 24.5/km^{2} (63.4/sq mi)
- Time zone: UTC+01:00 (CET)
  - Summer (DST): UTC+02:00 (CEST)
- INSEE/Postal code: 54048 /54150
- ^{1} French Land Register data, which excludes lakes, ponds, glaciers > 1 km^{2} (0.386 sq mi or 247 acres) and river estuaries.

Les Baroches (French pronunciation: [le baʁɔʃ]) is a commune in the Meurthe-et-Moselle department in northeastern France.

== Population ==
Historical population
| Year | Pop. | ±% p.a. |
|---|---|---|
| 1968 | 285 | — |
| 1975 | 257 | −1.47% |
| 1982 | 295 | +1.99% |
| 1990 | 312 | +0.70% |
| 1999 | 348 | +1.22% |
| 2007 | 361 | +0.46% |
| 2012 | 379 | +0.98% |
| 2017 | 351 | −1.52% |
| 2023 | 325 | −1.27% |
Source: INSEE

== See also ==
- Communes of the Meurthe-et-Moselle department
