= Anderny =

- Commune
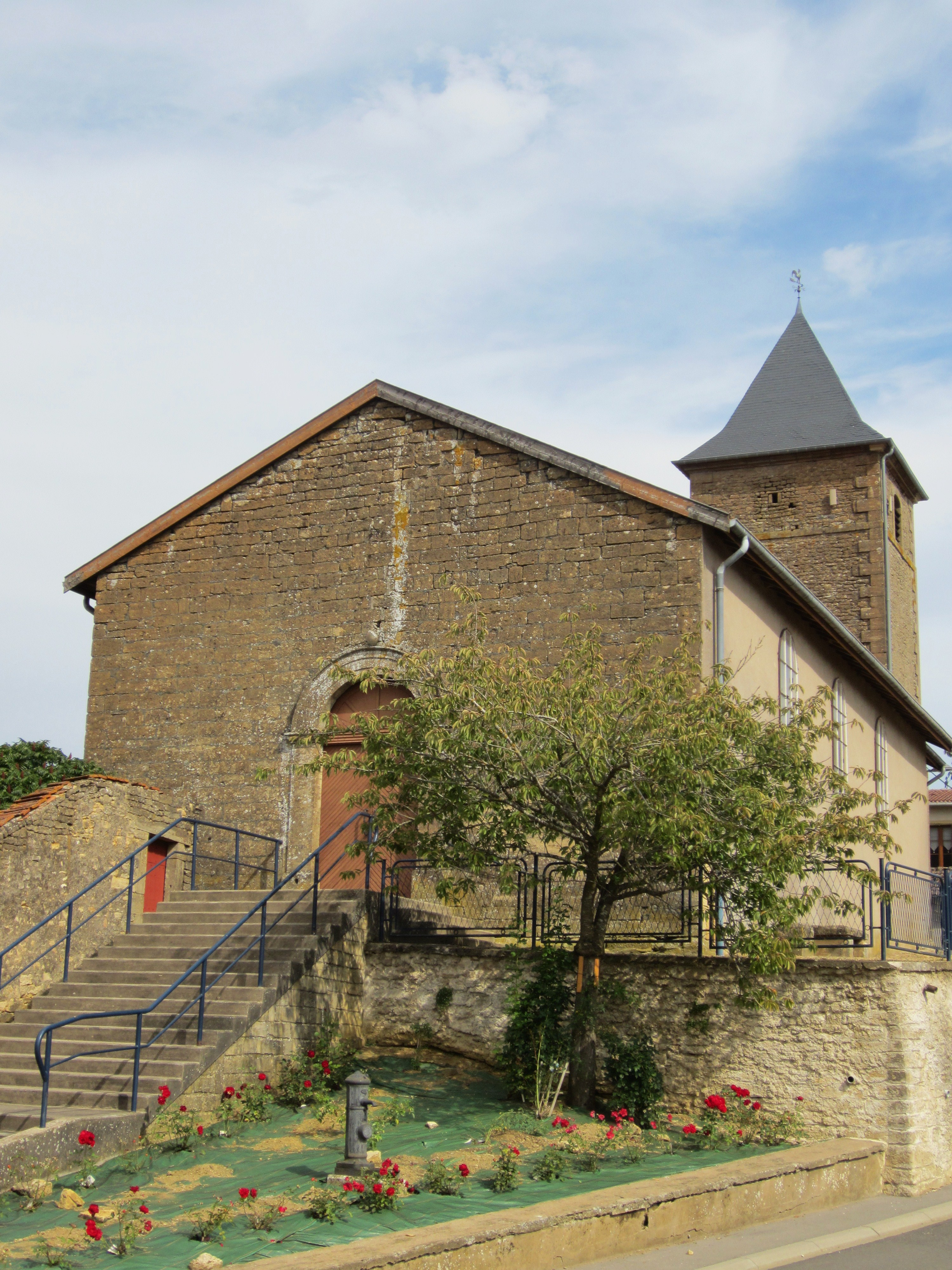
- Parish church of Saint-Étienne Anderny

- Coat of arms
- Location of Anderny
- Location within France Location within Grand Est
- Coordinates: 49°20′10″N 5°52′59″E
- Country: France
- Region: Grand Est
- Department: Meurthe-et-Moselle
- Arrondissement: Val-de-Briey
- Canton: Pays de Briey
- Intercommunality: Cœur du Pays-Haut

Government
  - Mayor (2020–2026): Patrick Bernard
- Area^{1}: 9.62 km^{2} (3.71 sq mi)
- Elevation: 294 m (965 ft)
- Highest elevation: 356 m (1,168 ft)
- Lowest elevation: 259 m (850 ft)
- Population (2023): 254
  - Density: 26.4/km^{2} (68.4/sq mi)
- Time zone: UTC+01:00 (CET)
  - Summer (DST): UTC+02:00 (CEST)
- INSEE/Postal code: 54015 /54560
- ^{1} French Land Register data, which excludes lakes, ponds, glaciers > 1 km^{2} (0.386 sq mi or 247 acres) and river estuaries.

Anderny (French pronunciation: [ɑ̃dɛʁni]) is a commune in the Meurthe-et-Moselle department in northeastern France.

== Population ==
Historical population
| Year | Pop. | ±% p.a. |
|---|---|---|
| 1968 | 326 | — |
| 1975 | 288 | −1.75% |
| 1982 | 241 | −2.51% |
| 1990 | 199 | −2.37% |
| 1999 | 222 | +1.22% |
| 2007 | 313 | +4.39% |
| 2012 | 270 | −2.91% |
| 2017 | 254 | −1.21% |
| 2023 | 254 | +0.00% |
Source: INSEE

== See also ==
- Communes of the Meurthe-et-Moselle department
