= Lubey =

- Commune
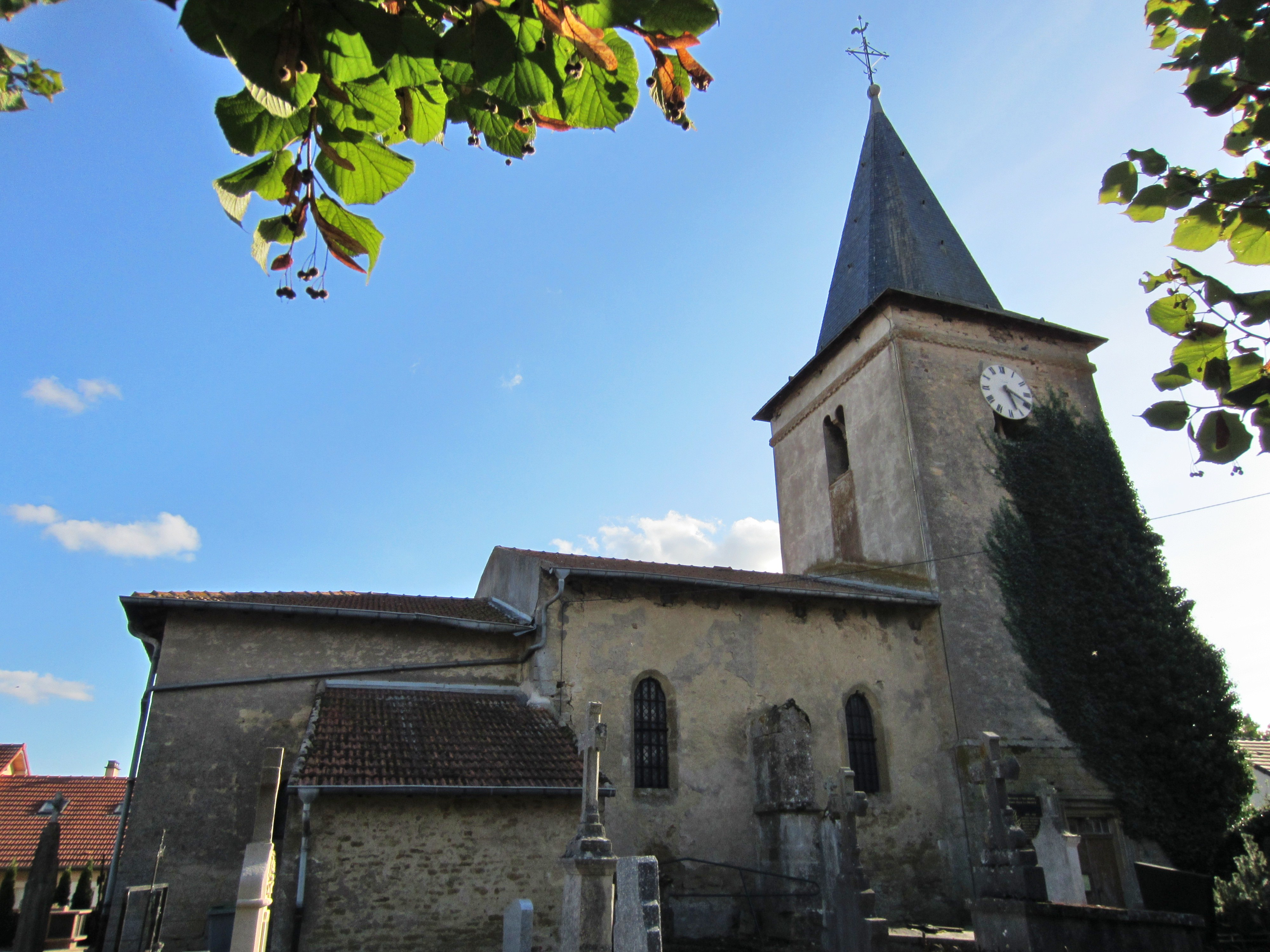
- The church in Lubey

- Coat of arms
- Location of Lubey
- Location within France Location within Grand Est
- Coordinates: 49°14′43″N 5°51′21″E
- Country: France
- Region: Grand Est
- Department: Meurthe-et-Moselle
- Arrondissement: Val-de-Briey
- Canton: Pays de Briey
- Intercommunality: CC Orne Lorraine Confluences

Government
  - Mayor (2020–2026): Paul Jodel
- Area^{1}: 3.93 km^{2} (1.52 sq mi)
- Elevation: 223 m (732 ft)
- Highest elevation: 242 m (794 ft)
- Lowest elevation: 204 m (669 ft)
- Population (2023): 215
  - Density: 54.7/km^{2} (142/sq mi)
- Time zone: UTC+01:00 (CET)
  - Summer (DST): UTC+02:00 (CEST)
- INSEE/Postal code: 54326 /54150
- ^{1} French Land Register data, which excludes lakes, ponds, glaciers > 1 km^{2} (0.386 sq mi or 247 acres) and river estuaries.

Lubey (French pronunciation: [lybɛ]) is a commune in the Meurthe-et-Moselle department in north-eastern France.

== See also ==
- Communes of the Meurthe-et-Moselle department
