= Beuvillers, Meurthe-et-Moselle =

Beuvillers
- Commune
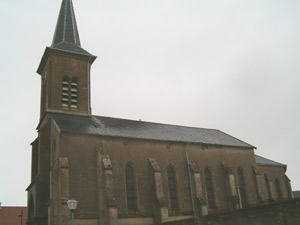
- The church in Beuvillers

- Coat of arms
- Location of Beuvillers
- Location within France Location within Grand Est
- Coordinates: 49°23′04″N 5°54′58″E
- Country: France
- Region: Grand Est
- Department: Meurthe-et-Moselle
- Arrondissement: Val-de-Briey
- Canton: Pays de Briey

Government
  - Mayor (2020–2026): Joseph Ammendolea
- Area^{1}: 5.95 km^{2} (2.30 sq mi)
- Elevation: 367 m (1,204 ft)
- Highest elevation: 391 m (1,283 ft)
- Lowest elevation: 332 m (1,089 ft)
- Population (2023): 557
  - Density: 93.6/km^{2} (242/sq mi)
- Time zone: UTC+01:00 (CET)
  - Summer (DST): UTC+02:00 (CEST)
- INSEE/Postal code: 54069 /54560
- ^{1} French Land Register data, which excludes lakes, ponds, glaciers > 1 km^{2} (0.386 sq mi or 247 acres) and river estuaries.

Beuvillers is a commune in the Meurthe-et-Moselle department in northeastern France.

== Population ==
Historical population
Year	Pop.	±% p.a.
1968	275	—
1975	272	−0.16%
1982	329	+2.76%
1990	282	−1.91%
1999	307	+0.95%
2007	319	+0.48%
2012	373	+3.18%
2017	424	+2.60%
2023	557	+4.65%
Source: INSEE

== See also ==
- Communes of the Meurthe-et-Moselle department
