= Lantéfontaine =

- Commune
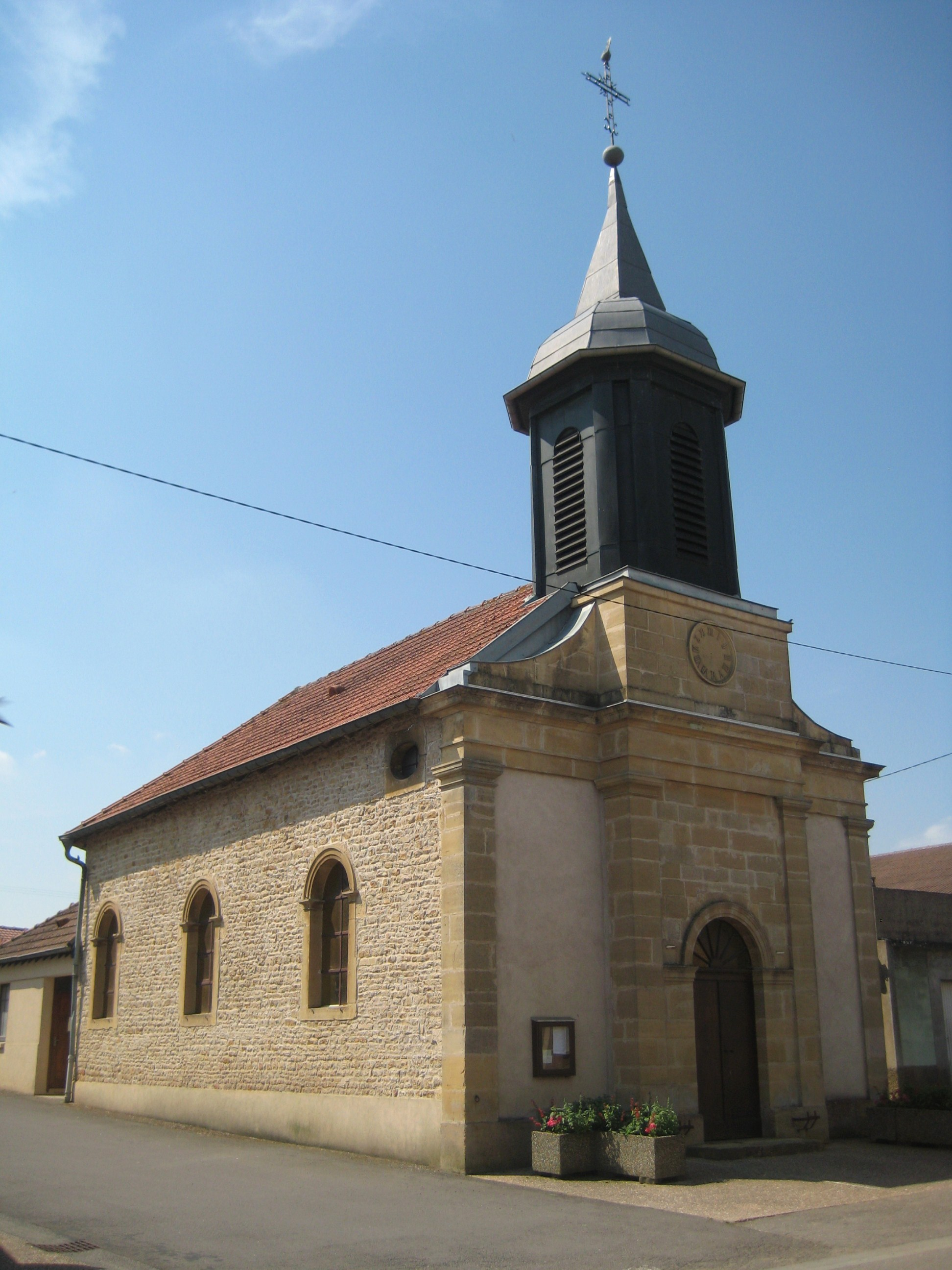
- The church in Lantéfontaine

- Coat of arms
- Location of Lantéfontaine
- Location within France Location within Grand Est
- Coordinates: 49°15′02″N 5°54′34″E
- Country: France
- Region: Grand Est
- Department: Meurthe-et-Moselle
- Arrondissement: Val-de-Briey
- Canton: Pays de Briey
- Intercommunality: CC Orne Lorraine Confluences

Government
  - Mayor (2020–2026): Edouard Kowalewski
- Area^{1}: 8.06 km^{2} (3.11 sq mi)
- Elevation: 232 m (761 ft)
- Highest elevation: 261 m (856 ft)
- Lowest elevation: 213 m (699 ft)
- Population (2023): 730
  - Density: 91/km^{2} (230/sq mi)
- Time zone: UTC+01:00 (CET)
  - Summer (DST): UTC+02:00 (CEST)
- INSEE/Postal code: 54302 /54150
- ^{1} French Land Register data, which excludes lakes, ponds, glaciers > 1 km^{2} (0.386 sq mi or 247 acres) and river estuaries.

Lantéfontaine (French pronunciation: [lɑ̃tefɔ̃tɛn]) is a commune in the Meurthe-et-Moselle department in north-eastern France.

== See also ==
- Communes of the Meurthe-et-Moselle department
