= Tucquegnieux =

- Commune
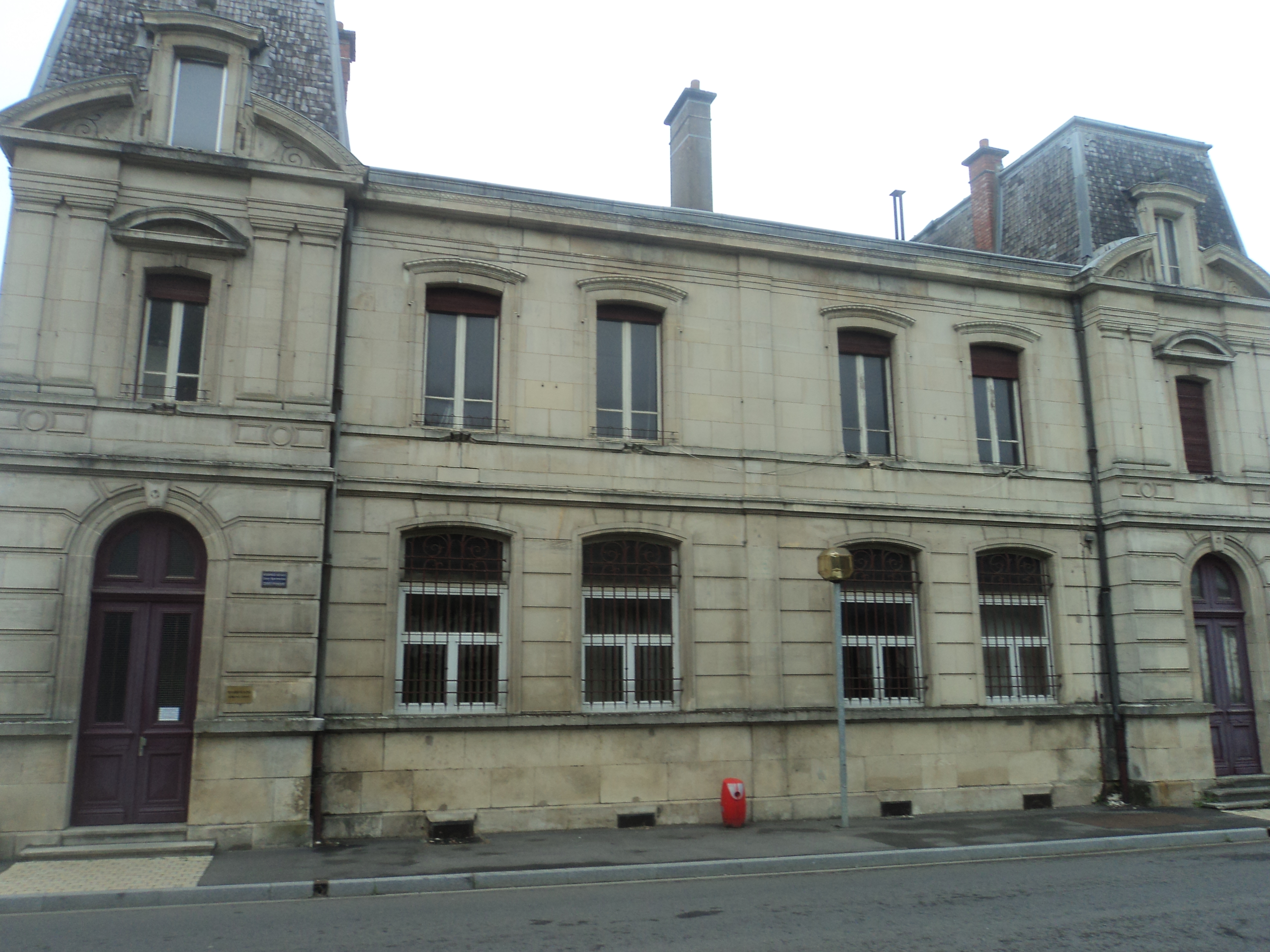
- The old town hall in Tucquegnieux

- Coat of arms
- Location of Tucquegnieux
- Location within France Location within Grand Est
- Coordinates: 49°18′13″N 5°53′01″E
- Country: France
- Region: Grand Est
- Department: Meurthe-et-Moselle
- Arrondissement: Val-de-Briey
- Canton: Pays de Briey
- Intercommunality: CC Cœur du Pays-Haut

Government
  - Mayor (2020–2026): Marianne Della-Noce/ Wawrzyniak
- Area^{1}: 9.20 km^{2} (3.55 sq mi)
- Elevation: 240 m (790 ft)
- Highest elevation: 310 m (1,020 ft)
- Lowest elevation: 228 m (748 ft)
- Population (2023): 2,441
  - Density: 265/km^{2} (687/sq mi)
- Time zone: UTC+01:00 (CET)
  - Summer (DST): UTC+02:00 (CEST)
- INSEE/Postal code: 54536 /54640
- ^{1} French Land Register data, which excludes lakes, ponds, glaciers > 1 km^{2} (0.386 sq mi or 247 acres) and river estuaries.

Tucquegnieux (French pronunciation: [tykɲø]) is a commune in the Meurthe-et-Moselle department in north-eastern France.

== Population ==
Historical population
Year	Pop.	±% p.a.
1968	4,842	—
1975	3,911	−3.00%
1982	3,367	−2.12%
1990	3,017	−1.36%
1999	2,726	−1.12%
2007	2,634	−0.43%
2012	2,565	−0.53%
2017	2,469	−0.76%
2023	2,441	−0.19%
Source: INSEE

== See also ==
- Communes of the Meurthe-et-Moselle department
