= Canton of Pays de Briey =

Canton of France

Coordinates: 49.23°N 6.01°E

The canton of Pays de Briey is an administrative division of the Meurthe-et-Moselle department, northeastern France. It was created at the French canton reorganisation which came into effect in March 2015. Its seat is in Jœuf.

It consists of the following communes:

1. Abbéville-lès-Conflans
2. Affléville
3. Anderny
4. Anoux
5. Audun-le-Roman
6. Avillers
7. Avril
8. Les Baroches
9. Béchamps
10. Bettainvillers
11. Beuvillers
12. Domprix
13. Fléville-Lixières
14. Gondrecourt-Aix
15. Jœuf
16. Joppécourt
17. Joudreville
18. Landres
19. Lantéfontaine
20. Lubey
21. Mairy-Mainville
22. Malavillers
23. Mercy-le-Bas
24. Mercy-le-Haut
25. Mont-Bonvillers
26. Mouaville
27. Murville
28. Norroy-le-Sec
29. Ozerailles
30. Piennes
31. Preutin-Higny
32. Sancy
33. Thumeréville
34. Trieux
35. Tucquegnieux
36. Val de Briey
37. Xivry-Circourt
