= Canton of Blâmont =

Former canton in Meurthe-et-Moselle, France

Coordinates: 48°29′30″N 6°51′58″E

- Former canton
- Location of the canton in the arrondissement of Lunéville
- Country: France
- Region: Grand Est
- Department: Meurthe-et-Moselle
- No. of communes: {{{nbcomm}}}
- Disbanded: 2015

Government
  - Representatives: Philippe Colin
- Area: 236.17 km^{2} (91.19 sq mi)
- Population (2012): 5,492
  - Density: 23.25/km^{2} (60.23/sq mi)

The canton of Blâmont (French: Canton de Blâmont) is a former French canton located in the department of Meurthe-et-Moselle in the Lorraine region (now part of Grand Est). This canton was organized around Blâmont in the arrondissement of Lunéville. It is now part of the canton of Baccarat.

The last general councillor from this canton was Philippe Colin (DVG), elected in 2011.

== Composition ==
The canton of Blâmont grouped together 33 municipalities and had 5,492 inhabitants (2012 census without double counts).

1. Amenoncourt
2. Ancerviller
3. Autrepierre
4. Avricourt
5. Barbas
6. Blâmont
7. Blémerey
8. Buriville
9. Chazelles-sur-Albe
10. Domèvre-sur-Vezouze
11. Domjevin
12. Emberménil
13. Fréménil
14. Frémonville
15. Gogney
16. Gondrexon
17. Halloville
18. Harbouey
19. Herbéviller
20. Igney
21. Leintrey
22. Montreux
23. Nonhigny
24. Ogéviller
25. Réclonville
26. Reillon
27. Remoncourt
28. Repaix
29. Saint-Martin
30. Vaucourt
31. Vého
32. Verdenal
33. Xousse
