= Canton of Arracourt =

Former canton in Meurthe-et-Moselle, France

Coordinates: 48°43′39″N 6°29′42″E

- Former canton
- Location of the canton in the arrondissement of Lunéville
- Country: France
- Region: Grand Est
- Department: Meurthe-et-Moselle
- No. of communes: {{{nbcomm}}}
- Disbanded: 2015

Government
  - Representatives: Michel Marchal
- Area: 112.68 km^{2} (43.51 sq mi)
- Population (2010): 1,377
  - Density: 12.22/km^{2} (31.65/sq mi)

The canton of Arracourt (French: Canton d'Arracourt) is a former French canton located in the department of Meurthe-et-Moselle in the Lorraine region (now part of Grand Est). This canton was organized around Arracourt in the arrondissement of Lunéville. It is now part of the canton of Baccarat.

The last general councillor from this canton was Michel Marchal (DVD), elected in 2004.

== Composition ==
The canton of Arracourt grouped together 11 municipalities and had 1,377 inhabitants (2012 census without double counts).

1. Arracourt
2. Athienville
3. Bathelémont
4. Bezange-la-Grande
5. Bures
6. Coincourt
7. Juvrecourt
8. Mouacourt
9. Parroy
10. Réchicourt-la-Petite
11. Xures
