= Canton of Cirey-sur-Vezouze =

Former canton in Meurthe-et-Moselle, France

Coordinates: 48°35′08″N 6°54′09″E

- Former canton
- Location of the canton in the arrondissement of Lunéville
- Country: France
- Region: Grand Est
- Department: Meurthe-et-Moselle
- No. of communes: {{{nbcomm}}}
- Disbanded: 2015

Government
  - Representatives: Josiane Tallotte
- Area: 98.65 km^{2} (38.09 sq mi)
- Population (2012): 3,275
  - Density: 33.20/km^{2} (85.98/sq mi)

The canton of Cirey-sur-Vezouze (French: Canton de Cirey-sur-Vezouze) is a former French canton located in the department of Meurthe-et-Moselle in the Lorraine region (now part of Grand Est). This canton was organized around Cirey-sur-Vezouze in the arrondissement of Lunéville. It is now part of the canton of Baccarat.

The last general councillor from this canton was Josiane Tallotte (DVG), elected in 2008.

== Composition ==
The canton of Cirey-sur-Vezouze grouped together 7 municipalities and had 3,275 inhabitants (2012 census without double counts).

1. Bertrambois
2. Cirey-sur-Vezouze
3. Parux
4. Petitmont
5. Saint-Sauveur
6. Tanconville
7. Val-et-Châtillon
