= Blémerey =

Blémerey is the name of the following communes in France:

- Blémerey, Meurthe-et-Moselle, in the Meurthe-et-Moselle department
- Blémerey, Vosges, in the Vosges department
