= Igney =

Igney may refer to the following places in France:

- Igney, Meurthe-et-Moselle, a commune in the Meurthe-et-Moselle department
- Igney, Vosges, a commune in the Vosges department
