= Lachapelle, Meurthe-et-Moselle =

Lachapelle
- Commune
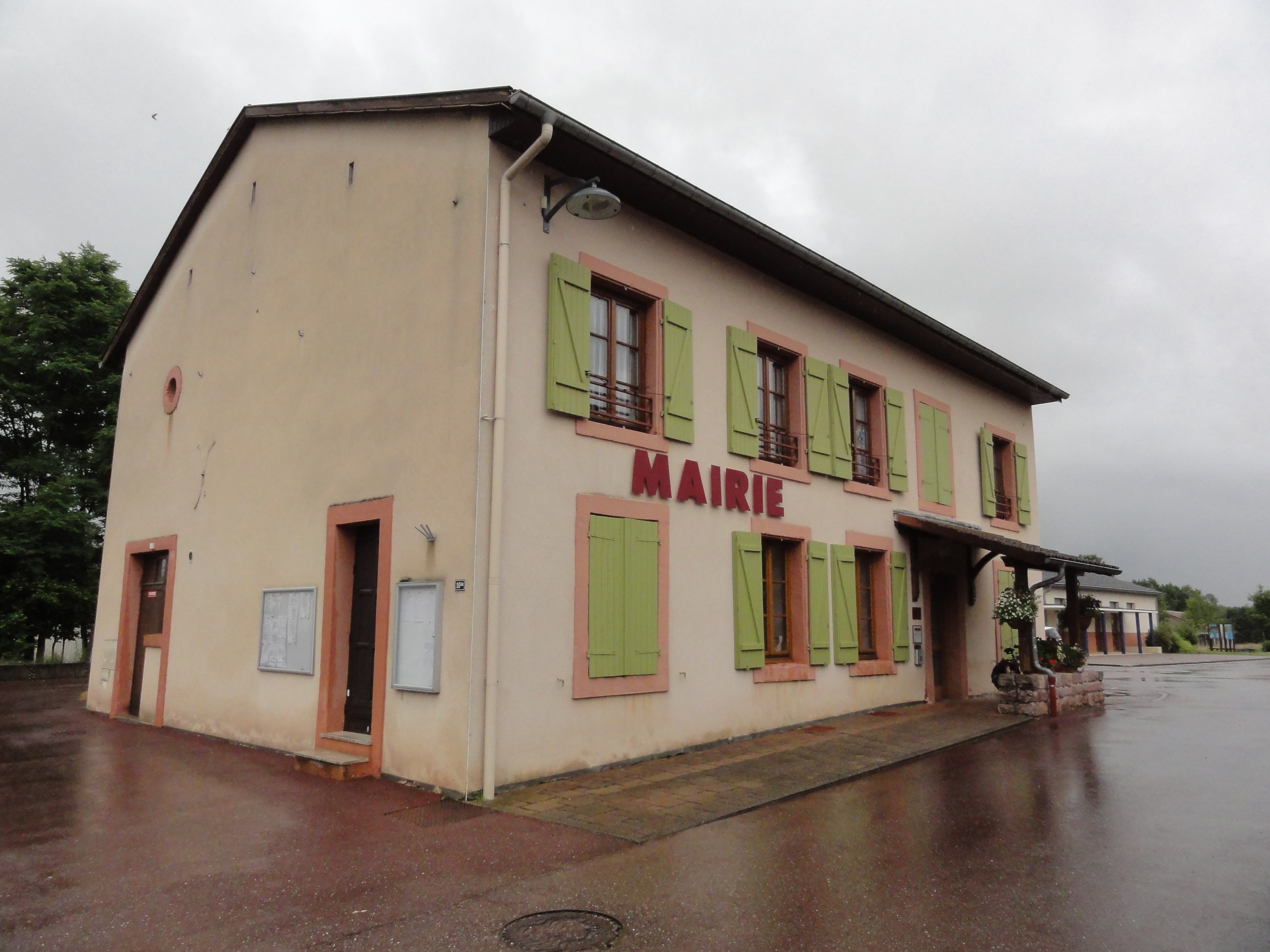
- The town hall in Lachapelle

- Coat of arms
- Location of Lachapelle
- Location within France Location within Grand Est
- Coordinates: 48°25′12″N 6°47′26″E
- Country: France
- Region: Grand Est
- Department: Meurthe-et-Moselle
- Arrondissement: Lunéville
- Canton: Baccarat
- Intercommunality: CC Territoire de Lunéville à Baccarat

Government
  - Mayor (2024–2026): Gaël Thirion
- Area^{1}: 10.17 km^{2} (3.93 sq mi)
- Elevation: 284 m (932 ft)
- Highest elevation: 397 m (1,302 ft)
- Lowest elevation: 269 m (883 ft)
- Population (2023): 257
  - Density: 25.3/km^{2} (65.5/sq mi)
- Time zone: UTC+01:00 (CET)
  - Summer (DST): UTC+02:00 (CEST)
- INSEE/Postal code: 54287 /54120
- ^{1} French Land Register data, which excludes lakes, ponds, glaciers > 1 km^{2} (0.386 sq mi or 247 acres) and river estuaries.

Lachapelle (French pronunciation: [laʃapɛl]) is a commune in the Meurthe-et-Moselle department in north-eastern France.

== See also ==
- Communes of the Meurthe-et-Moselle department
