= Montigny, Meurthe-et-Moselle =

Montigny
- Commune
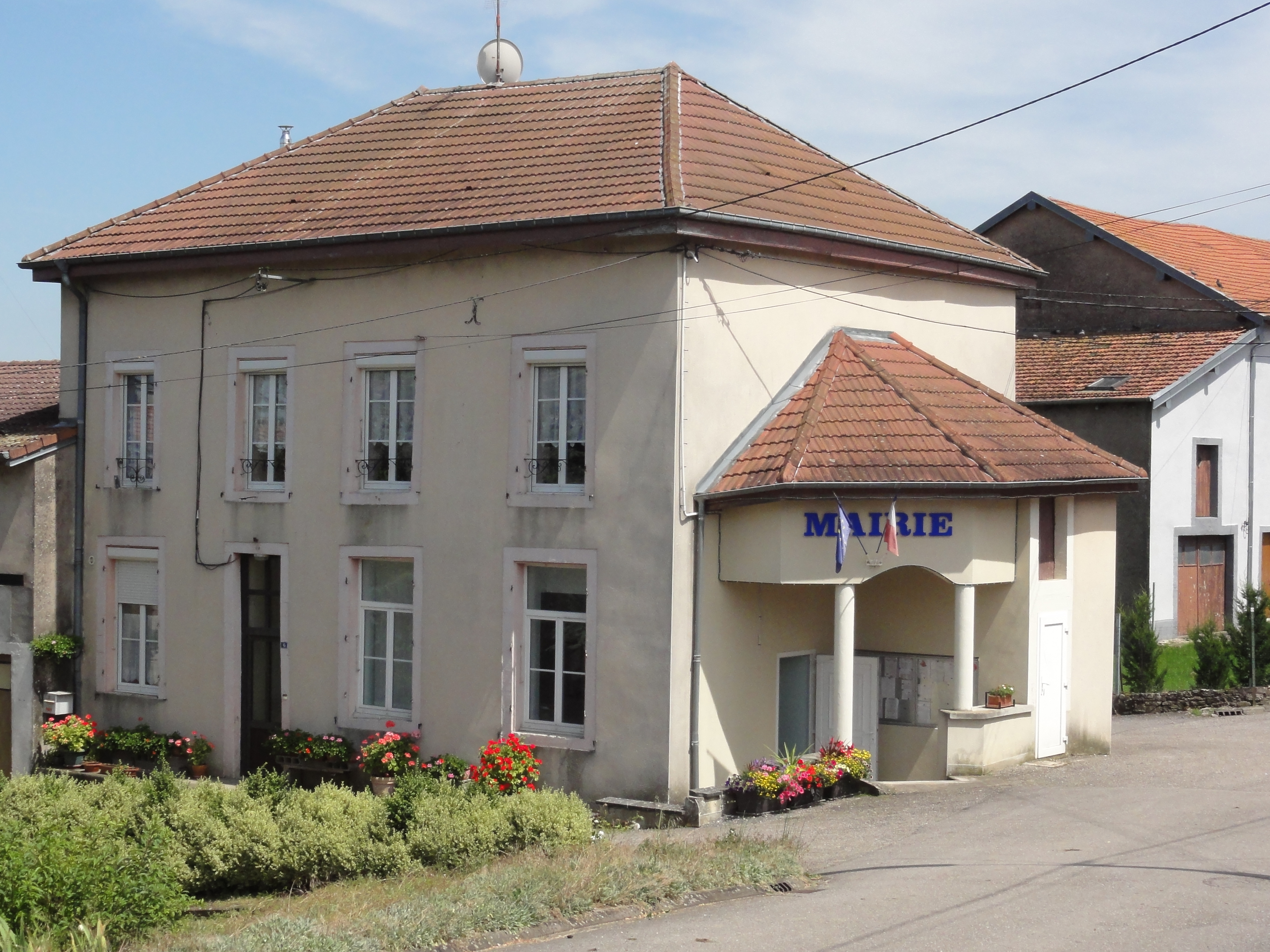
- The town hall in Montigny

- Coat of arms
- Location of Montigny
- Location within France Location within Grand Est
- Coordinates: 48°31′00″N 6°48′02″E
- Country: France
- Region: Grand Est
- Department: Meurthe-et-Moselle
- Arrondissement: Lunéville
- Canton: Baccarat
- Intercommunality: CC de Vezouze en Piémont

Government
  - Mayor (2020–2026): Yolande Boulenger
- Area^{1}: 6.11 km^{2} (2.36 sq mi)
- Elevation: 280 m (920 ft)
- Highest elevation: 317 m (1,040 ft)
- Lowest elevation: 263 m (863 ft)
- Population (2023): 147
  - Density: 24.1/km^{2} (62.3/sq mi)
- Time zone: UTC+01:00 (CET)
  - Summer (DST): UTC+02:00 (CEST)
- INSEE/Postal code: 54377 /54540
- ^{1} French Land Register data, which excludes lakes, ponds, glaciers > 1 km^{2} (0.386 sq mi or 247 acres) and river estuaries.

Montigny (French pronunciation: [mɔ̃tiɲi]) is a commune in the Meurthe-et-Moselle department in north-eastern France.

== See also ==
- Communes of the Meurthe-et-Moselle department
