= Méhoncourt =

- Commune
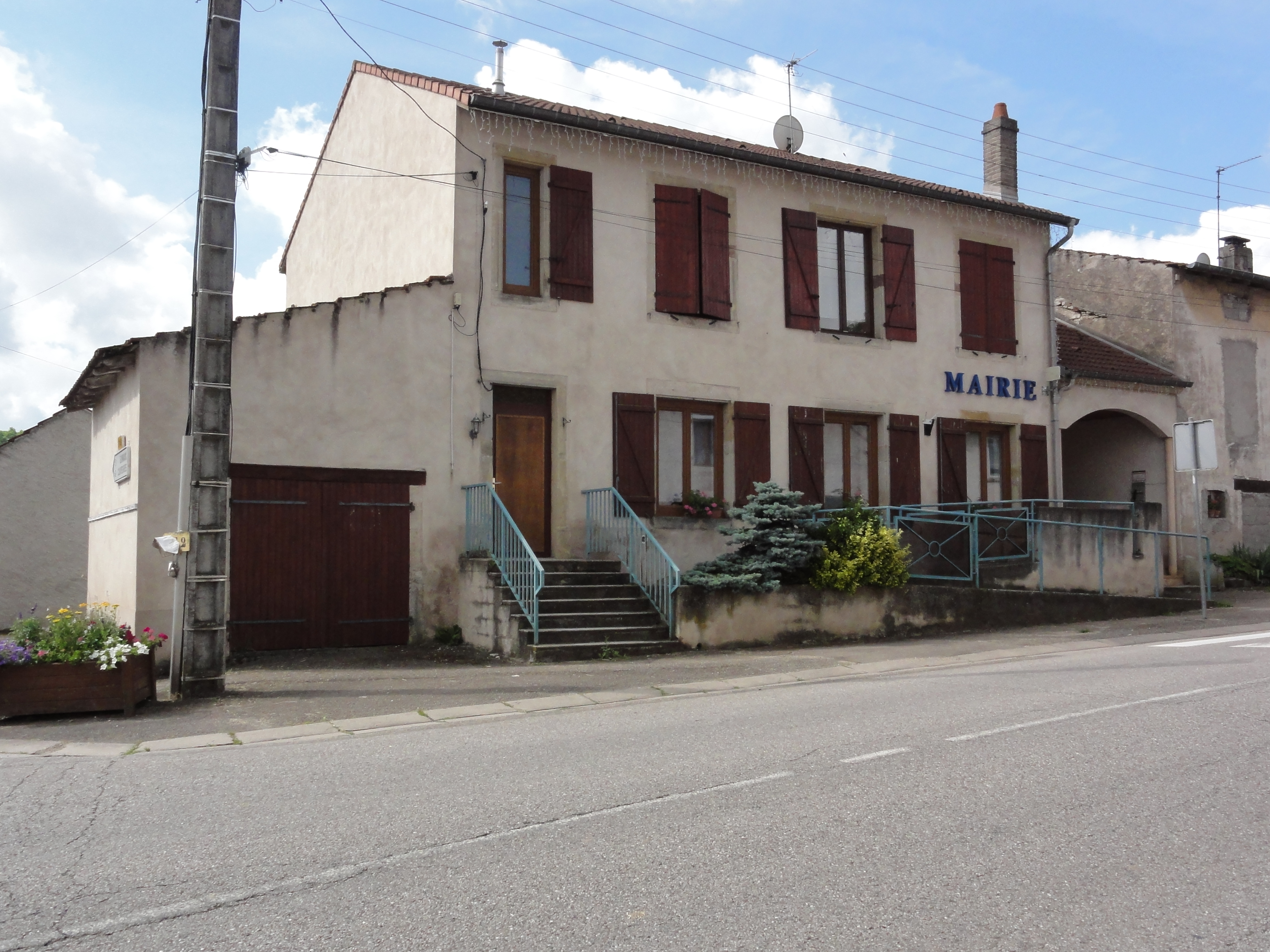
- The town hall in Méhoncourt

- Coat of arms
- Location of Méhoncourt
- Location within France Location within Grand Est
- Coordinates: 48°30′41″N 6°22′34″E
- Country: France
- Region: Grand Est
- Department: Meurthe-et-Moselle
- Arrondissement: Lunéville
- Canton: Lunéville-2
- Intercommunality: CC Meurthe, Mortagne, Moselle

Government
  - Mayor (2020–2026): Thierry Mercier
- Area^{1}: 7.87 km^{2} (3.04 sq mi)
- Elevation: 275 m (902 ft)
- Highest elevation: 358 m (1,175 ft)
- Lowest elevation: 262 m (860 ft)
- Population (2023): 240
  - Density: 30/km^{2} (79/sq mi)
- Time zone: UTC+01:00 (CET)
  - Summer (DST): UTC+02:00 (CEST)
- INSEE/Postal code: 54359 /54360
- ^{1} French Land Register data, which excludes lakes, ponds, glaciers > 1 km^{2} (0.386 sq mi or 247 acres) and river estuaries.

Méhoncourt (French pronunciation: [me.ɔ̃kuʁ]) is a commune in the Meurthe-et-Moselle department in north-eastern France.

== See also ==
- Communes of the Meurthe-et-Moselle department
