= Arrondissement of Lunéville =

Coordinates: 48°35′N 6°29′E

Lunéville
- Arrondissement
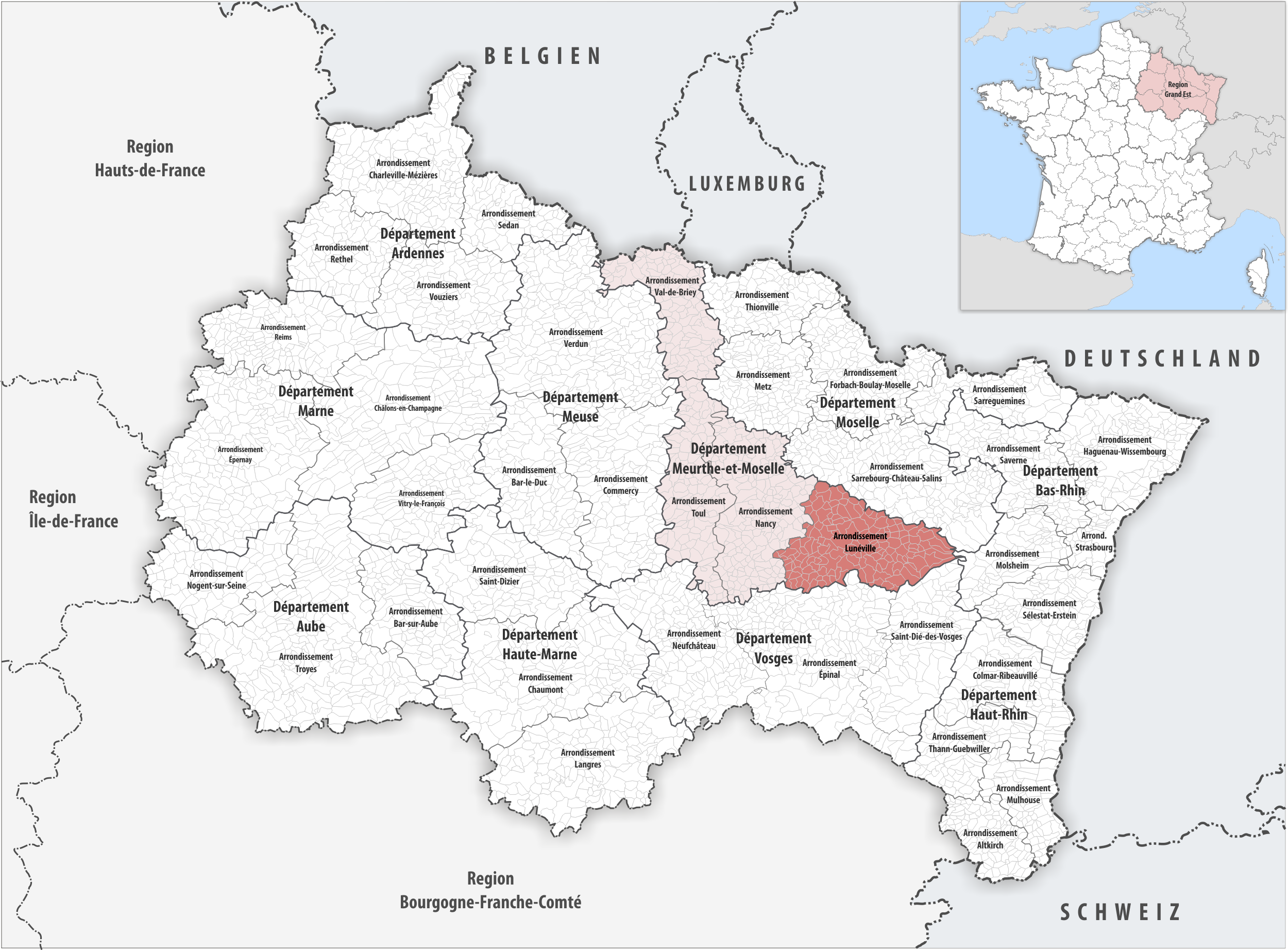
- Location within the region Grand Est
- Country: France
- Region: Grand Est
- Department: Meurthe-et-Moselle
- No. of communes: {{{nbcomm}}}
- Area: 1,438.1 km^{2} (555.3 sq mi)
- Population (2023): 74,751
  - Density: 51.979/km^{2} (134.62/sq mi)
- INSEE code: 542

The arrondissement of Lunéville is an arrondissement of France in the Meurthe-et-Moselle department in the Grand Est region. It has 162 communes. Its population is 74,722 (2021), and its area is 1,438.1 km^{2} (555.3 sq mi).

== Composition ==
The communes of the arrondissement of Lunéville, and their INSEE codes, are:

1. Amenoncourt (54013)
2. Ancerviller (54014)
3. Angomont (54017)
4. Anthelupt (54020)
5. Arracourt (54023)
6. Athienville (54026)
7. Autrepierre (54030)
8. Avricourt (54035)
9. Azerailles (54038)
10. Baccarat (54039)
11. Badonviller (54040)
12. Barbas (54044)
13. Barbonville (54045)
14. Bathelémont (54050)
15. Bauzemont (54053)
16. Bayon (54054)
17. Bénaménil (54061)
18. Bertrambois (54064)
19. Bertrichamps (54065)
20. Bezange-la-Grande (54071)
21. Bienville-la-Petite (54074)
22. Bionville (54075)
23. Blainville-sur-l'Eau (54076)
24. Blâmont (54077)
25. Blémerey (54078)
26. Bonviller (54083)
27. Borville (54085)
28. Bréménil (54097)
29. Brémoncourt (54098)
30. Brouville (54101)
31. Bures (54106)
32. Buriville (54107)
33. Chanteheux (54116)
34. Charmois (54121)
35. Chazelles-sur-Albe (54124)
36. Chenevières (54125)
37. Cirey-sur-Vezouze (54129)
38. Clayeures (54130)
39. Coincourt (54133)
40. Courbesseaux (54139)
41. Crévéchamps (54144)
42. Crion (54147)
43. Croismare (54148)
44. Damelevières (54152)
45. Deneuvre (54154)
46. Deuxville (54155)
47. Domèvre-sur-Vezouze (54161)
48. Domjevin (54163)
49. Domptail-en-l'Air (54170)
50. Drouville (54173)
51. Einvaux (54175)
52. Einville-au-Jard (54176)
53. Emberménil (54177)
54. Essey-la-Côte (54183)
55. Fenneviller (54191)
56. Flainval (54195)
57. Flin (54199)
58. Fontenoy-la-Joûte (54201)
59. Fraimbois (54206)
60. Franconville (54209)
61. Fréménil (54210)
62. Frémonville (54211)
63. Froville (54216)
64. Gélacourt (54217)
65. Gerbéviller (54222)
66. Giriviller (54228)
67. Glonville (54229)
68. Gogney (54230)
69. Gondrexon (54233)
70. Hablainville (54243)
71. Haigneville (54245)
72. Halloville (54246)
73. Harbouey (54251)
74. Haudonville (54255)
75. Haussonville (54256)
76. Hénaménil (54258)
77. Herbéviller (54259)
78. Hériménil (54260)
79. Hoéville (54262)
80. Igney (54271)
81. Jolivet (54281)
82. Juvrecourt (54285)
83. Lachapelle (54287)
84. Lamath (54292)
85. Landécourt (54293)
86. Laneuveville-aux-Bois (54297)
87. Laronxe (54303)
88. Leintrey (54308)
89. Lorey (54324)
90. Loromontzey (54325)
91. Lunéville (54329)
92. Magnières (54331)
93. Maixe (54335)
94. Manonviller (54349)
95. Marainviller (54350)
96. Mattexey (54356)
97. Méhoncourt (54359)
98. Merviller (54365)
99. Mignéville (54368)
100. Moncel-lès-Lunéville (54373)
101. Montigny (54377)
102. Montreux (54381)
103. Mont-sur-Meurthe (54383)
104. Moriviller (54386)
105. Mouacourt (54388)
106. Moyen (54393)
107. Neufmaisons (54396)
108. Neuviller-lès-Badonviller (54398)
109. Nonhigny (54401)
110. Ogéviller (54406)
111. Parroy (54418)
112. Parux (54419)
113. Petitmont (54421)
114. Pettonville (54422)
115. Pexonne (54423)
116. Pierre-Percée (54427)
117. Raon-lès-Leau (54443)
118. Raville-sur-Sânon (54445)
119. Réchicourt-la-Petite (54446)
120. Réclonville (54447)
121. Rehainviller (54449)
122. Reherrey (54450)
123. Reillon (54452)
124. Remenoville (54455)
125. Remoncourt (54457)
126. Repaix (54458)
127. Romain (54461)
128. Rozelieures (54467)
129. Saint-Boingt (54471)
130. Saint-Clément (54472)
131. Sainte-Pôle (54484)
132. Saint-Germain (54475)
133. Saint-Mard (54479)
134. Saint-Martin (54480)
135. Saint-Maurice-aux-Forges (54481)
136. Saint-Rémy-aux-Bois (54487)
137. Saint-Sauveur (54488)
138. Seranville (54501)
139. Serres (54502)
140. Sionviller (54507)
141. Tanconville (54512)
142. Thiaville-sur-Meurthe (54519)
143. Thiébauménil (54520)
144. Vacqueville (54539)
145. Val-et-Châtillon (54540)
146. Valhey (54541)
147. Vallois (54543)
148. Vathiménil (54550)
149. Vaucourt (54551)
150. Vaxainville (54555)
151. Vého (54556)
152. Velle-sur-Moselle (54559)
153. Veney (54560)
154. Vennezey (54561)
155. Verdenal (54562)
156. Vigneulles (54565)
157. Villacourt (54567)
158. Virecourt (54585)
159. Vitrimont (54588)
160. Xermaménil (54595)
161. Xousse (54600)
162. Xures (54601)

== History ==
The arrondissement of Lunéville was created as part of the department Meurthe in 1800. Since 1871 it has been a part of the department Meurthe-et-Moselle. In January 2023, it gained one commune from the arrondissement of Nancy, and it lost three communes to the arrondissement of Nancy.

As a result of the reorganisation of the cantons of France which came into effect in 2015, the borders of the cantons are no longer related to the borders of the arrondissements. The cantons of the arrondissement of Lunéville were, as of January 2015:

1. Arracourt
2. Baccarat
3. Badonviller
4. Bayon
5. Blâmont
6. Cirey-sur-Vezouze
7. Gerbéviller
8. Lunéville-Nord
9. Lunéville-Sud
