= Thiaville-sur-Meurthe =

- Commune
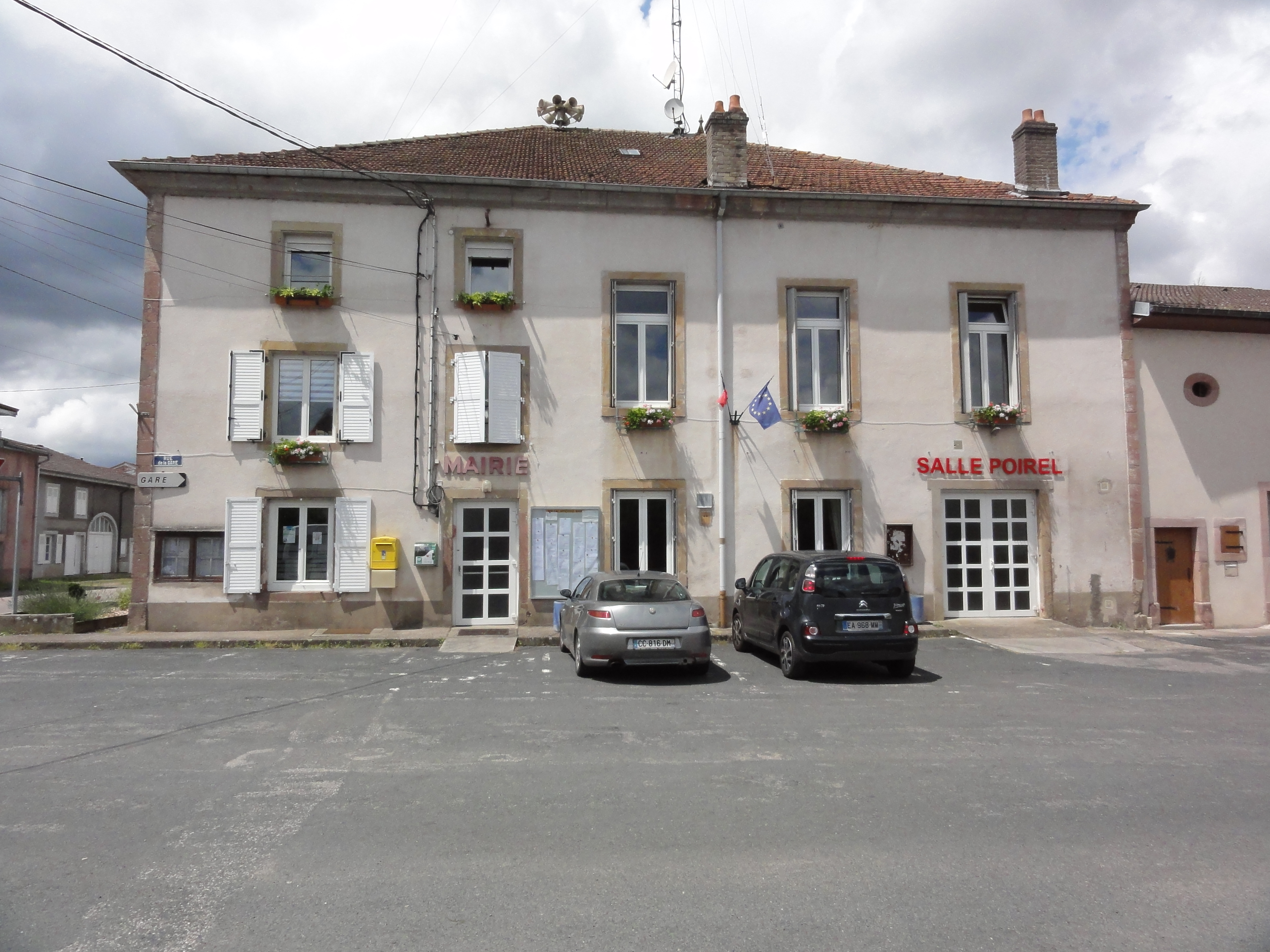
- The town hall in Thiaville-sur-Meurthe

- Coat of arms
- Location of Thiaville-sur-Meurthe
- Location within France Location within Grand Est
- Coordinates: 48°24′48″N 6°48′33″E
- Country: France
- Region: Grand Est
- Department: Meurthe-et-Moselle
- Arrondissement: Lunéville
- Canton: Baccarat
- Intercommunality: CC Territoire de Lunéville à Baccarat

Government
  - Mayor (2020–2026): Fréderic Thomas
- Area^{1}: 4.47 km^{2} (1.73 sq mi)
- Elevation: 282 m (925 ft)
- Highest elevation: 365 m (1,198 ft)
- Lowest elevation: 273 m (896 ft)
- Population (2023): 597
  - Density: 134/km^{2} (346/sq mi)
- Time zone: UTC+01:00 (CET)
  - Summer (DST): UTC+02:00 (CEST)
- INSEE/Postal code: 54519 /54120
- ^{1} French Land Register data, which excludes lakes, ponds, glaciers > 1 km^{2} (0.386 sq mi or 247 acres) and river estuaries.

Thiaville-sur-Meurthe (French pronunciation: [tjavil syʁ mœʁt], literally Thiaville on Meurthe) is a commune in the Meurthe-et-Moselle department in north-eastern France.

== See also ==
- Communes of the Meurthe-et-Moselle department
