= Fenneviller =

- Commune
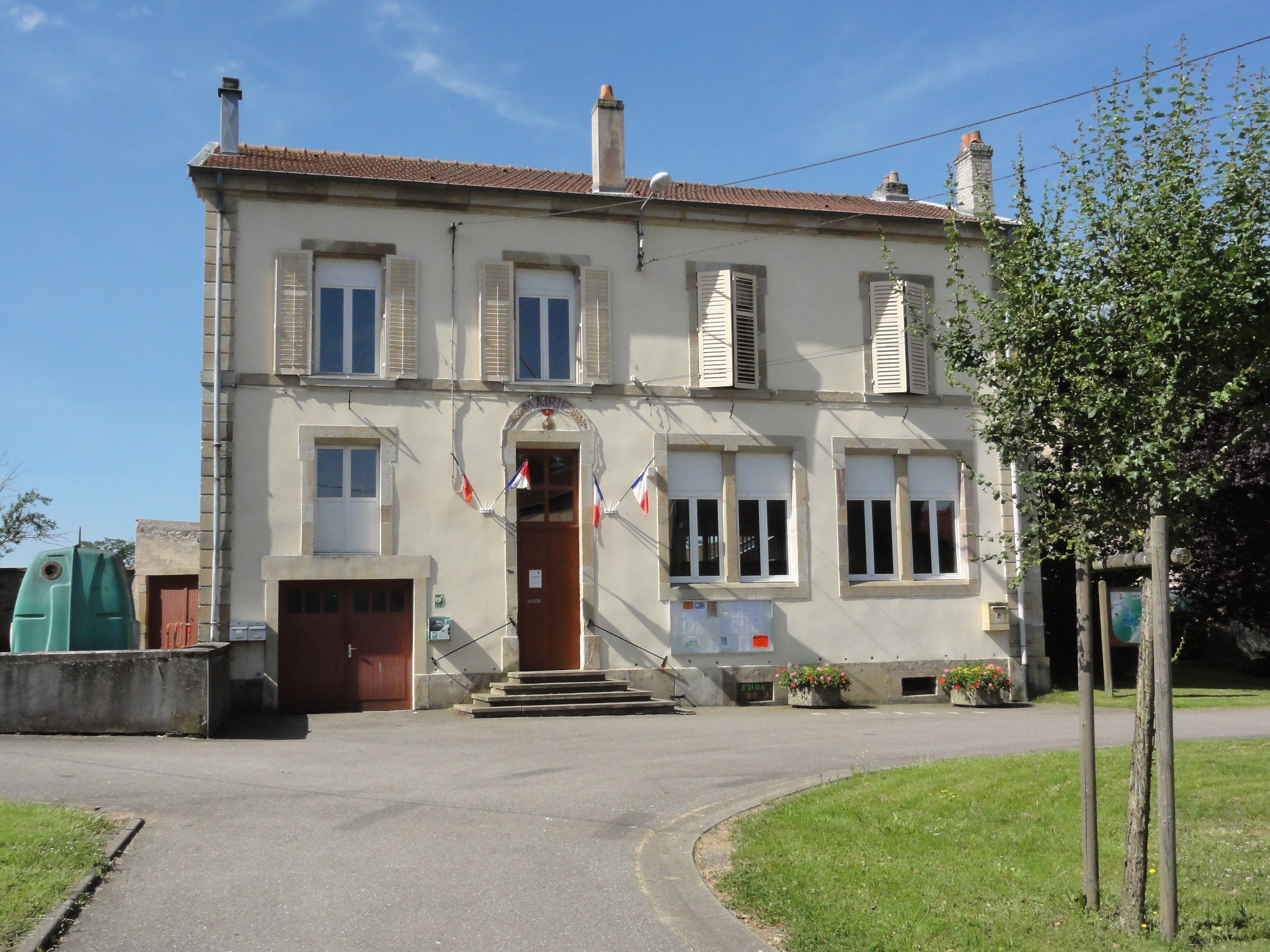
- The town hall in Fenneviller

- Coat of arms
- Location of Fenneviller
- Location within France Location within Grand Est
- Coordinates: 48°29′16″N 6°52′56″E
- Country: France
- Region: Grand Est
- Department: Meurthe-et-Moselle
- Arrondissement: Lunéville
- Canton: Baccarat
- Intercommunality: CC de Vezouze en Piémont

Government
  - Mayor (2020–2026): Mireille Mougin
- Area^{1}: 2.99 km^{2} (1.15 sq mi)
- Elevation: 319 m (1,047 ft)
- Highest elevation: 432 m (1,417 ft)
- Lowest elevation: 290 m (950 ft)
- Population (2023): 108
  - Density: 36.1/km^{2} (93.6/sq mi)
- Time zone: UTC+01:00 (CET)
  - Summer (DST): UTC+02:00 (CEST)
- INSEE/Postal code: 54191 /54540
- ^{1} French Land Register data, which excludes lakes, ponds, glaciers > 1 km^{2} (0.386 sq mi or 247 acres) and river estuaries.

Fenneviller is a commune in the Meurthe-et-Moselle department in north-eastern France.

== See also ==
- Communes of the Meurthe-et-Moselle department
