= Brouville =

- Commune
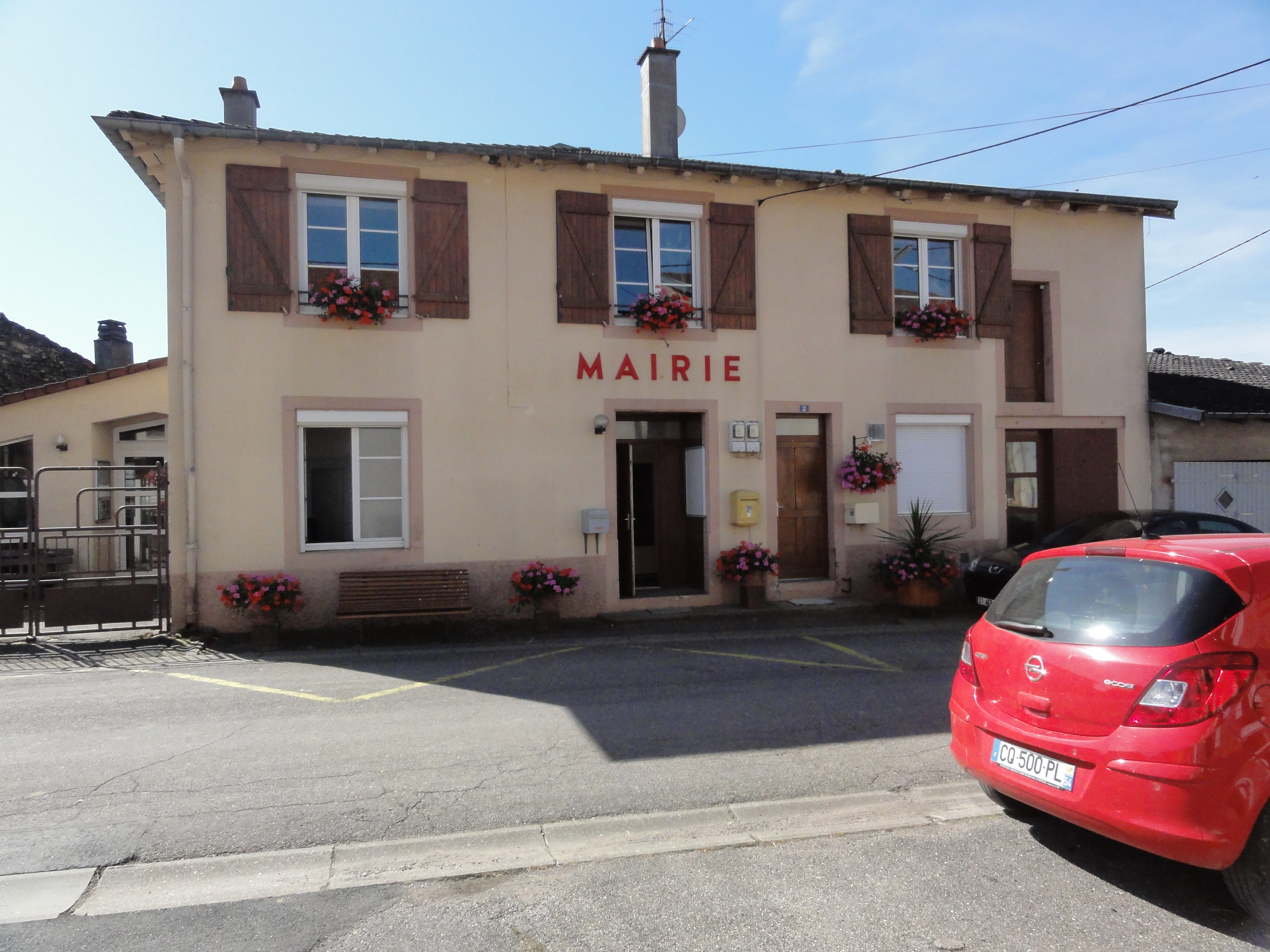
- The town hall in Brouville

- Coat of arms
- Location of Brouville
- Location within France Location within Grand Est
- Coordinates: 48°29′56″N 6°45′03″E
- Country: France
- Region: Grand Est
- Department: Meurthe-et-Moselle
- Arrondissement: Lunéville
- Canton: Baccarat
- Intercommunality: Territoire de Lunéville à Baccarat

Government
  - Mayor (2020–2026): Cédric Perrin
- Area^{1}: 9.7 km^{2} (3.7 sq mi)
- Elevation: 280 m (920 ft)
- Highest elevation: 343 m (1,125 ft)
- Lowest elevation: 258 m (846 ft)
- Population (2023): 115
  - Density: 12/km^{2} (31/sq mi)
- Time zone: UTC+01:00 (CET)
  - Summer (DST): UTC+02:00 (CEST)
- INSEE/Postal code: 54101 /54120
- ^{1} French Land Register data, which excludes lakes, ponds, glaciers > 1 km^{2} (0.386 sq mi or 247 acres) and river estuaries.

Brouville (French pronunciation: [bʁuvil]) is a commune in the Meurthe-et-Moselle department in northeastern France.

== Population ==
Historical population
Year	Pop.	±% p.a.
1968	144	—
1975	138	−0.61%
1982	120	−1.98%
1990	109	−1.19%
1999	123	+1.35%
2007	127	+0.40%
2012	128	+0.16%
2017	132	+0.62%
2023	115	−2.27%
Source: INSEE

== See also ==
- Communes of the Meurthe-et-Moselle department
