= Saint-Maurice-aux-Forges =

- Commune
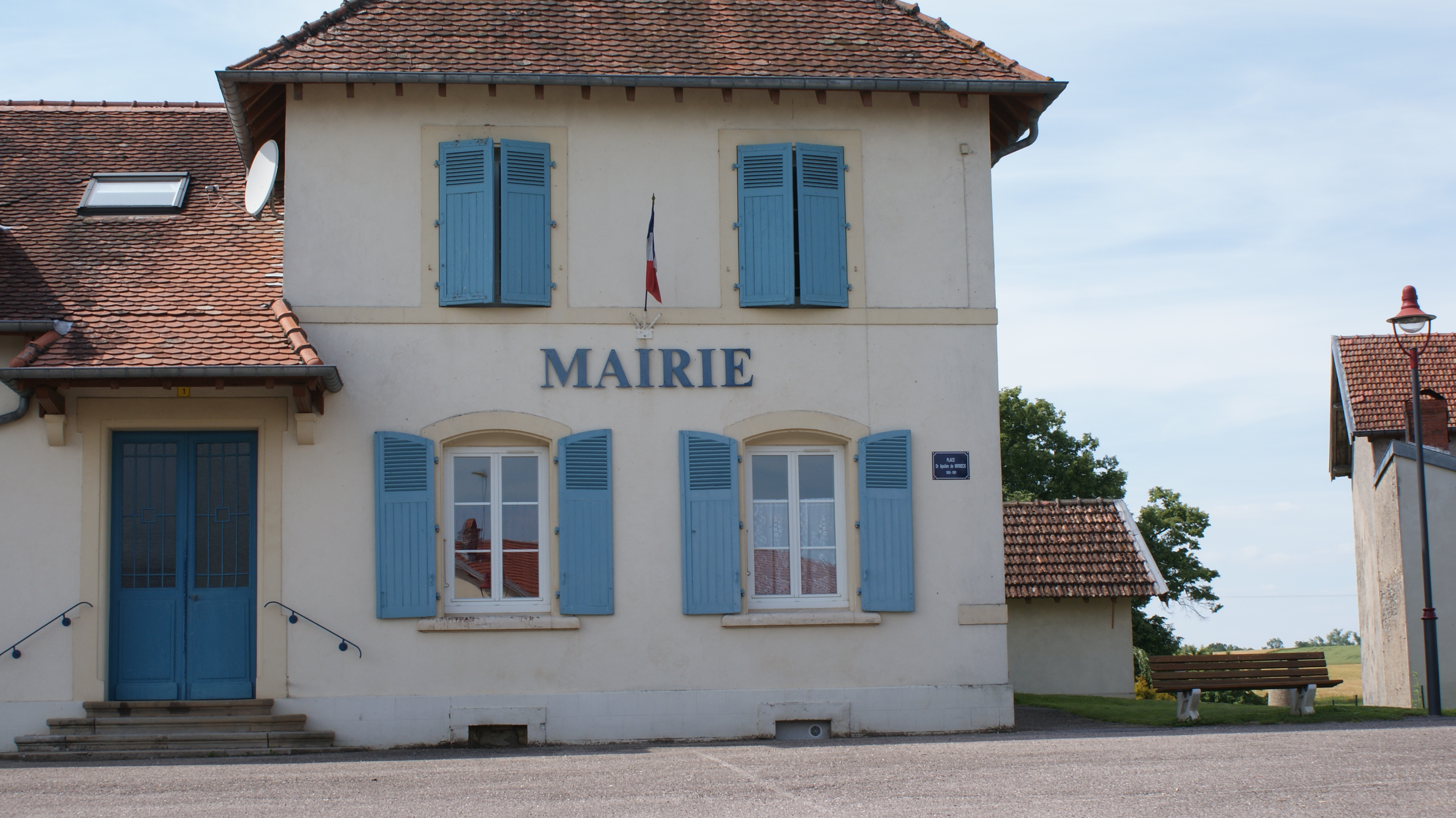
- The town hall in Saint-Maurice-aux-Forges

- Coat of arms
- Location of Saint-Maurice-aux-Forges
- Location within France Location within Grand Est
- Coordinates: 48°30′40″N 6°50′54″E
- Country: France
- Region: Grand Est
- Department: Meurthe-et-Moselle
- Arrondissement: Lunéville
- Canton: Baccarat
- Intercommunality: Vezouze en Piémont

Government
  - Mayor (2020–2026): Patrick Mangin
- Area^{1}: 3.3 km^{2} (1.3 sq mi)
- Elevation: 290 m (950 ft)
- Highest elevation: 320 m (1,050 ft)
- Lowest elevation: 278 m (912 ft)
- Population (2023): 103
  - Density: 31/km^{2} (81/sq mi)
- Time zone: UTC+01:00 (CET)
  - Summer (DST): UTC+02:00 (CEST)
- INSEE/Postal code: 54481 /54540
- ^{1} French Land Register data, which excludes lakes, ponds, glaciers > 1 km^{2} (0.386 sq mi or 247 acres) and river estuaries.

Saint-Maurice-aux-Forges (French pronunciation: [sɛ̃ mɔʁis o fɔʁʒ]) is a commune in the Meurthe-et-Moselle department in north-eastern France.

== Geography ==
=== Climate ===
Saint-Maurice-aux-Forges has an oceanic climate (Köppen climate classification Cfb). The average annual temperature in Saint-Maurice-aux-Forges is 10.5 °C (50.9 °F). The average annual rainfall is 837.4 mm (32.97 in) with May as the wettest month. The temperatures are highest on average in July, at around 19.3 °C (66.7 °F), and lowest in January, at around 2.0 °C (35.6 °F). The highest temperature ever recorded in Saint-Maurice-aux-Forges was 37.2 °C (99.0 °F) on 25 July 2019; the coldest temperature ever recorded was −19.9 °C (−3.8 °F) on 1 March 2005.

Climate data for Saint-Maurice-aux-Forges (1991−2020 normals, extremes 2002−present)
| Month | Jan | Feb | Mar | Apr | May | Jun | Jul | Aug | Sep | Oct | Nov | Dec | Year |
|---|---|---|---|---|---|---|---|---|---|---|---|---|---|
| Record high °C (°F) | 16.9 (62.4) | 20.5 (68.9) | 24.4 (75.9) | 29.5 (85.1) | 31.7 (89.1) | 37.4 (99.3) | 39.2 (102.6) | 38.2 (100.8) | 32.6 (90.7) | 27.3 (81.1) | 22.2 (72.0) | 17.3 (63.1) | 39.2 (102.6) |
| Mean daily maximum °C (°F) | 4.9 (40.8) | 6.4 (43.5) | 11.0 (51.8) | 16.2 (61.2) | 19.4 (66.9) | 23.7 (74.7) | 25.6 (78.1) | 24.9 (76.8) | 20.9 (69.6) | 15.6 (60.1) | 9.8 (49.6) | 5.9 (42.6) | 15.4 (59.7) |
| Daily mean °C (°F) | 2.0 (35.6) | 2.8 (37.0) | 6.0 (42.8) | 10.1 (50.2) | 13.6 (56.5) | 17.6 (63.7) | 19.3 (66.7) | 18.8 (65.8) | 15.1 (59.2) | 11.1 (52.0) | 6.5 (43.7) | 3.2 (37.8) | 10.5 (50.9) |
| Mean daily minimum °C (°F) | −0.8 (30.6) | −0.8 (30.6) | 1.1 (34.0) | 4.0 (39.2) | 7.9 (46.2) | 11.5 (52.7) | 13.0 (55.4) | 12.8 (55.0) | 9.2 (48.6) | 6.6 (43.9) | 3.2 (37.8) | 0.5 (32.9) | 5.7 (42.3) |
| Record low °C (°F) | −15.2 (4.6) | −17.2 (1.0) | −19.9 (−3.8) | −6.4 (20.5) | −1.6 (29.1) | 1.3 (34.3) | 4.0 (39.2) | 4.8 (40.6) | 0.0 (32.0) | −6.1 (21.0) | −11.5 (11.3) | −18.5 (−1.3) | −19.9 (−3.8) |
| Average precipitation mm (inches) | 70.8 (2.79) | 56.7 (2.23) | 58.9 (2.32) | 52.3 (2.06) | 84.0 (3.31) | 71.6 (2.82) | 77.8 (3.06) | 79.6 (3.13) | 68.4 (2.69) | 73.1 (2.88) | 71.2 (2.80) | 73.0 (2.87) | 837.4 (32.97) |
| Average precipitation days (≥ 1.0 mm) | 12.7 | 10.7 | 10.1 | 8.8 | 11.6 | 9.7 | 10.3 | 10.6 | 8.1 | 10.4 | 11.5 | 13.6 | 128.1 |
Source: Météo-France

== See also ==
- Communes of the Meurthe-et-Moselle department
