= Charmois, Meurthe-et-Moselle =

Charmois
- Commune
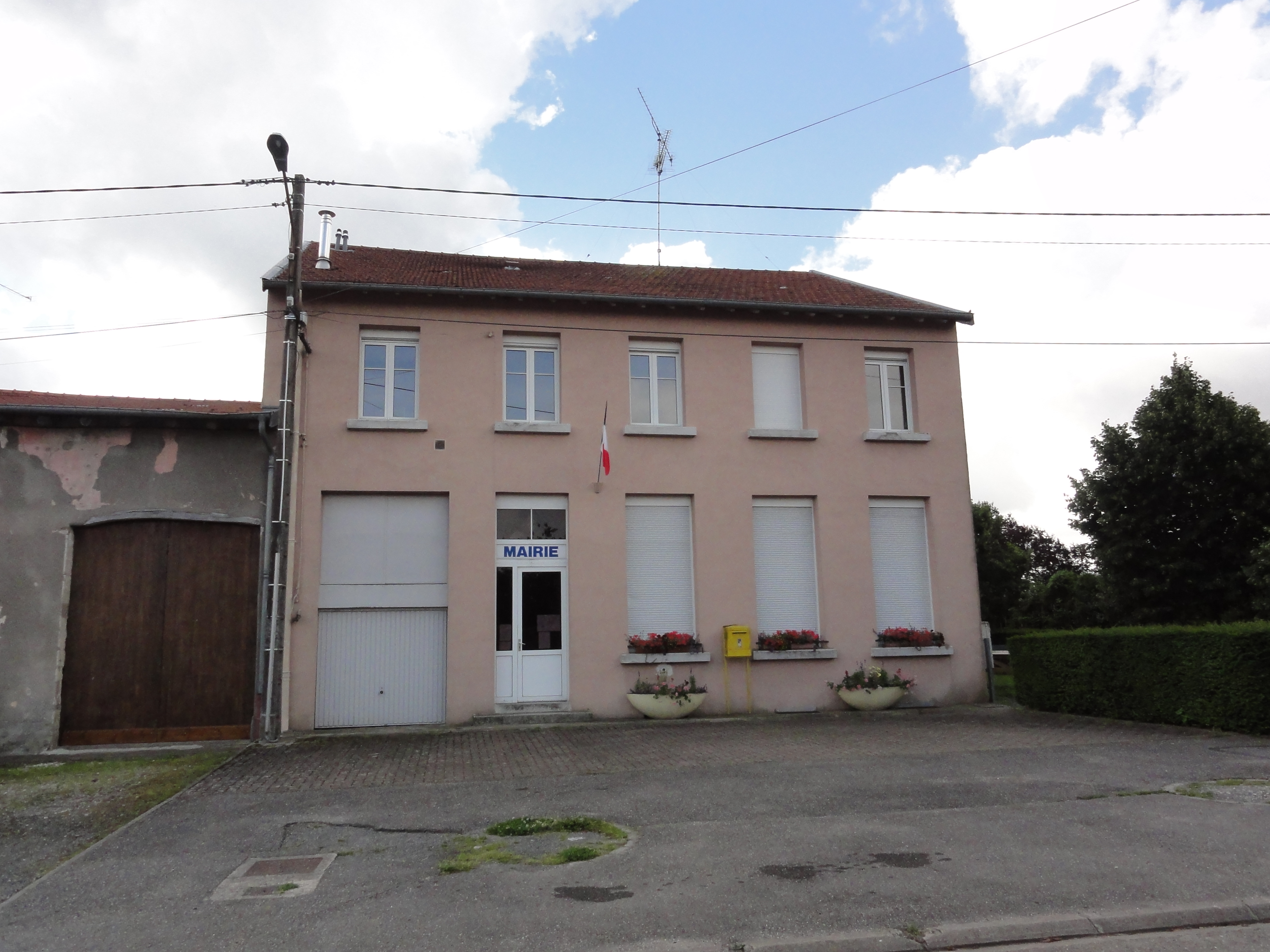
- The town hall in Charmois

- Coat of arms
- Location of Charmois
- Location within France Location within Grand Est
- Coordinates: 48°32′26″N 6°23′03″E
- Country: France
- Region: Grand Est
- Department: Meurthe-et-Moselle
- Arrondissement: Lunéville
- Canton: Lunéville-2
- Intercommunality: CC Meurthe, Mortagne, Moselle

Government
  - Mayor (2020–2026): Hervé Marcillat
- Area^{1}: 5.41 km^{2} (2.09 sq mi)
- Elevation: 268 m (879 ft)
- Highest elevation: 288 m (945 ft)
- Lowest elevation: 230 m (750 ft)
- Population (2023): 201
  - Density: 37.2/km^{2} (96.2/sq mi)
- Time zone: UTC+01:00 (CET)
  - Summer (DST): UTC+02:00 (CEST)
- INSEE/Postal code: 54121 /54360
- ^{1} French Land Register data, which excludes lakes, ponds, glaciers > 1 km^{2} (0.386 sq mi or 247 acres) and river estuaries.

Charmois (French pronunciation: [ʃaʁmwa]) is a commune in the Meurthe-et-Moselle department in north-eastern France.

== See also ==
- Communes of the Meurthe-et-Moselle department
