= Laronxe =

- Commune
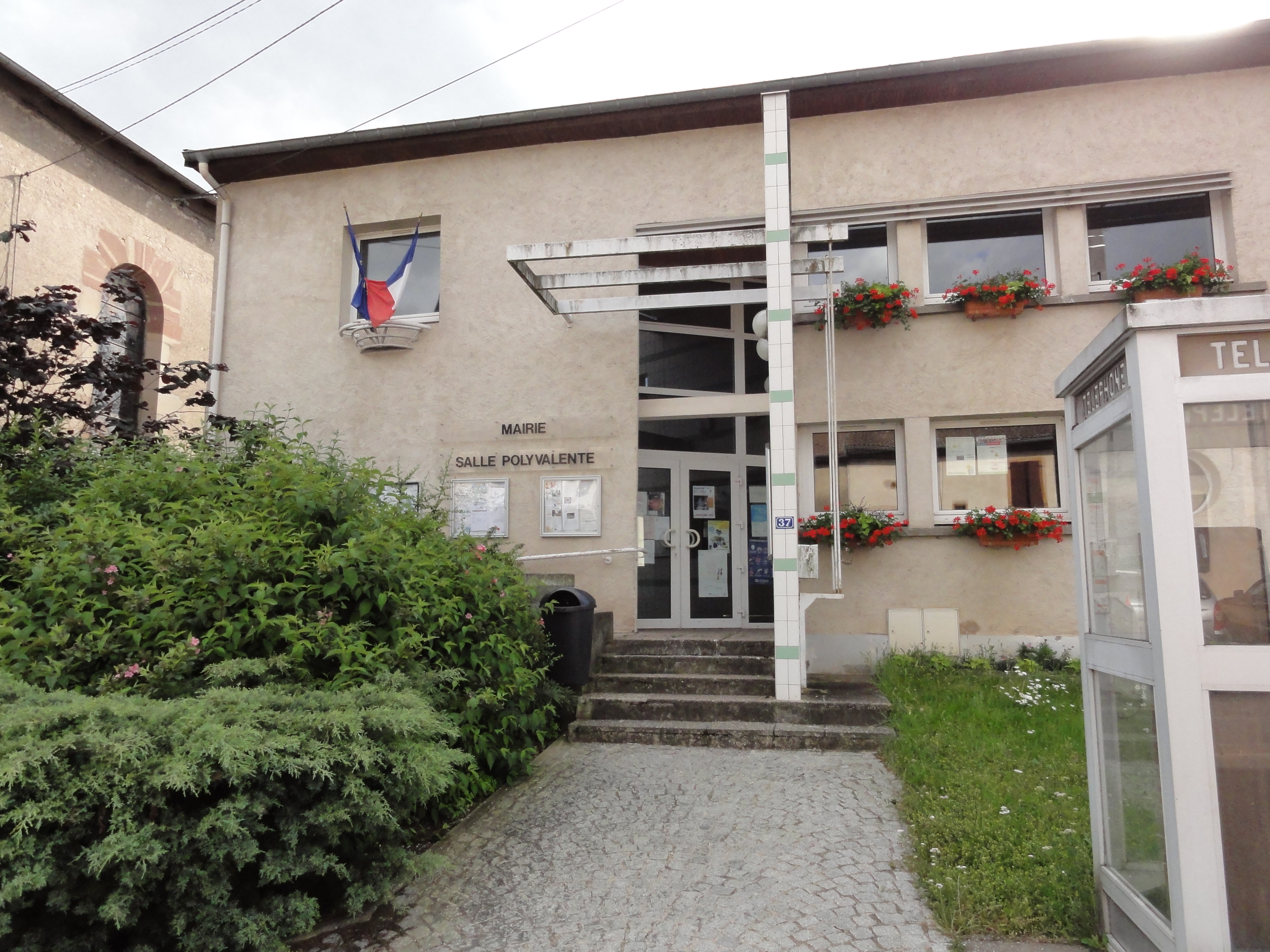
- The town hall in Laronxe

- Coat of arms
- Location of Laronxe
- Location within France Location within Grand Est
- Coordinates: 48°32′30″N 6°36′18″E
- Country: France
- Region: Grand Est
- Department: Meurthe-et-Moselle
- Arrondissement: Lunéville
- Canton: Baccarat
- Intercommunality: CC Territoire de Lunéville à Baccarat

Government
  - Mayor (2020–2026): Hervé Bertrand
- Area^{1}: 6.83 km^{2} (2.64 sq mi)
- Elevation: 252 m (827 ft)
- Highest elevation: 281 m (922 ft)
- Lowest elevation: 234 m (768 ft)
- Population (2023): 361
  - Density: 52.9/km^{2} (137/sq mi)
- Time zone: UTC+01:00 (CET)
  - Summer (DST): UTC+02:00 (CEST)
- INSEE/Postal code: 54303 /54950
- ^{1} French Land Register data, which excludes lakes, ponds, glaciers > 1 km^{2} (0.386 sq mi or 247 acres) and river estuaries.

Laronxe is a commune in the Meurthe-et-Moselle department in north-eastern France. It is 40 km south east of Nancy.

It is served by the St-Clément-Laronxe train station located in the nearby commune of Saint-Clément.

== See also ==
- Communes of the Meurthe-et-Moselle department
