= Saint-Sauveur, Meurthe-et-Moselle =

Saint-Sauveur
- Commune
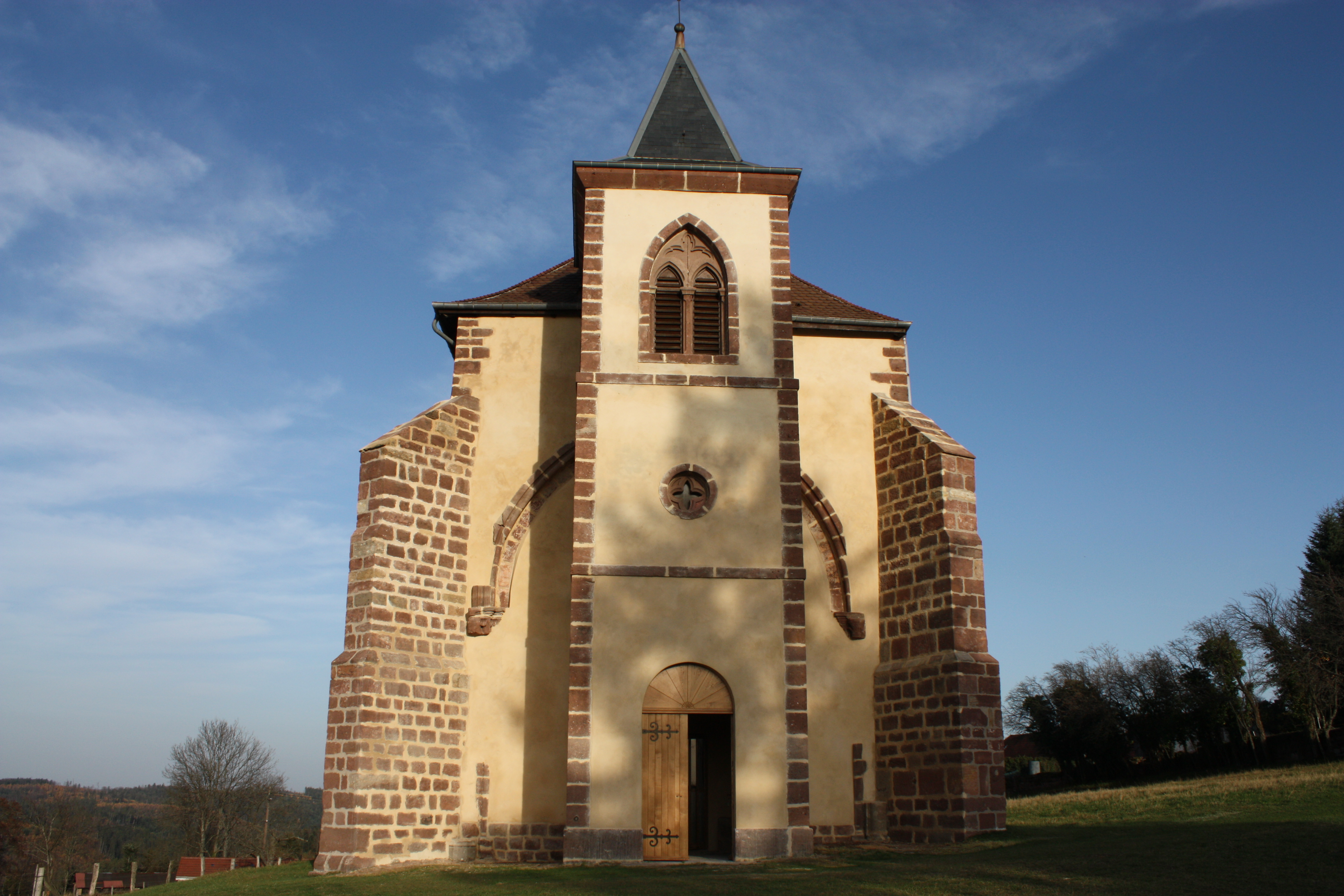
- The former abbey church in Saint-Sauveur

- Coat of arms
- Location of Saint-Sauveur
- Location within France Location within Grand Est
- Coordinates: 48°32′04″N 6°58′28″E
- Country: France
- Region: Grand Est
- Department: Meurthe-et-Moselle
- Arrondissement: Lunéville
- Canton: Baccarat

Government
  - Mayor (2020–2026): Philippe Arnould
- Area^{1}: 19.16 km^{2} (7.40 sq mi)
- Elevation: 400 m (1,300 ft)
- Highest elevation: 715 m (2,346 ft)
- Lowest elevation: 315 m (1,033 ft)
- Population (2023): 43
  - Density: 2.2/km^{2} (5.8/sq mi)
- Time zone: UTC+01:00 (CET)
  - Summer (DST): UTC+02:00 (CEST)
- INSEE/Postal code: 54488 /54480
- ^{1} French Land Register data, which excludes lakes, ponds, glaciers > 1 km^{2} (0.386 sq mi or 247 acres) and river estuaries.

Saint-Sauveur (French pronunciation: [sɛ̃ sovœʁ]) is a commune in the Meurthe-et-Moselle department in north-eastern France.

== See also ==
- Communes of the Meurthe-et-Moselle department
