= Herbéviller =

- Commune
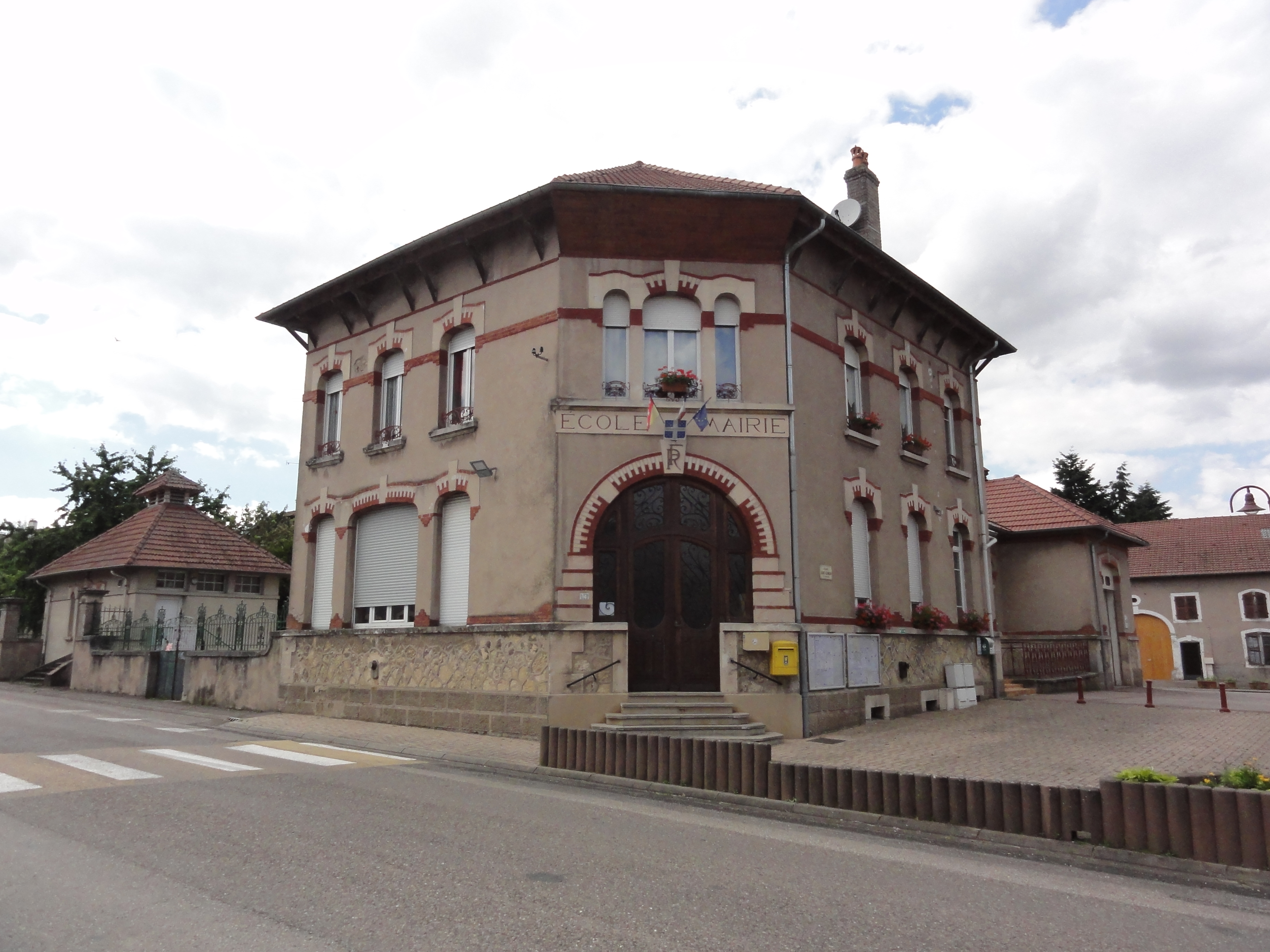
- The town hall and school in Herbéviller

- Coat of arms
- Location of Herbéviller
- Location within France Location within Grand Est
- Coordinates: 48°33′28″N 6°45′15″E
- Country: France
- Region: Grand Est
- Department: Meurthe-et-Moselle
- Arrondissement: Lunéville
- Canton: Baccarat

Government
  - Mayor (2020–2026): Gilbert Bregeard
- Area^{1}: 8.12 km^{2} (3.14 sq mi)
- Elevation: 250 m (820 ft)
- Highest elevation: 286 m (938 ft)
- Lowest elevation: 241 m (791 ft)
- Population (2023): 214
  - Density: 26.4/km^{2} (68.3/sq mi)
- Time zone: UTC+01:00 (CET)
  - Summer (DST): UTC+02:00 (CEST)
- INSEE/Postal code: 54259 /54450
- ^{1} French Land Register data, which excludes lakes, ponds, glaciers > 1 km^{2} (0.386 sq mi or 247 acres) and river estuaries.

Herbéviller (French pronunciation: [ɛʁbevile]) is a commune in the Meurthe-et-Moselle department in north-eastern France.

== See also ==
- Communes of the Meurthe-et-Moselle department
