= Chazelles-sur-Albe =

- Commune
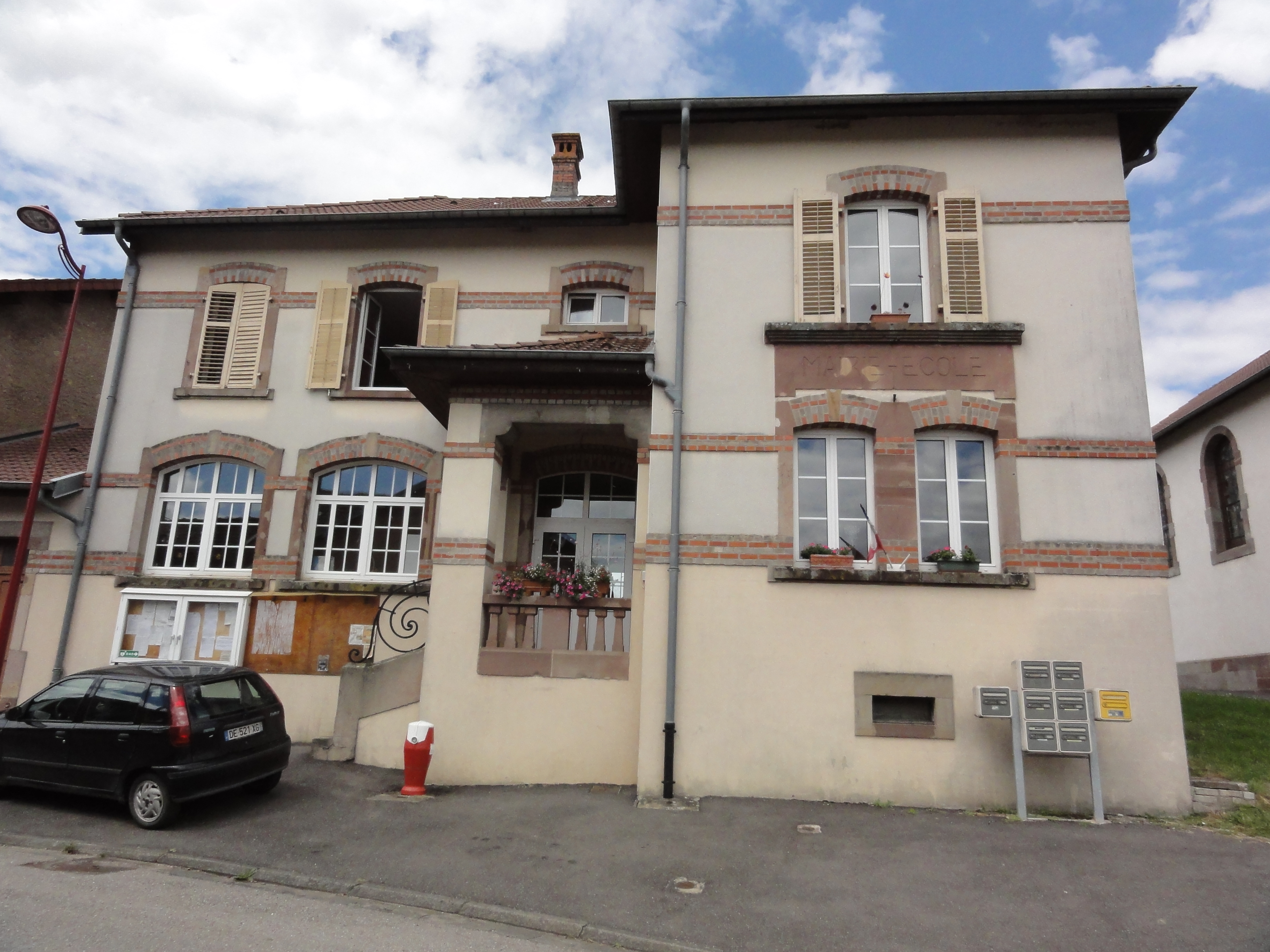
- The town hall in Chazelles-sur-Albe

- Coat of arms
- Location of Chazelles-sur-Albe
- Location within France Location within Grand Est
- Coordinates: 48°35′26″N 6°46′47″E
- Country: France
- Region: Grand Est
- Department: Meurthe-et-Moselle
- Arrondissement: Lunéville
- Canton: Baccarat

Government
  - Mayor (2020–2026): Frédéric Marchal
- Area^{1}: 3.39 km^{2} (1.31 sq mi)
- Highest elevation: 286 m (938 ft)
- Lowest elevation: 251 m (823 ft)
- Population (2023): 50
  - Density: 15/km^{2} (38/sq mi)
- Time zone: UTC+01:00 (CET)
  - Summer (DST): UTC+02:00 (CEST)
- INSEE/Postal code: 54124 /54450
- ^{1} French Land Register data, which excludes lakes, ponds, glaciers > 1 km^{2} (0.386 sq mi or 247 acres) and river estuaries.

Chazelles-sur-Albe (French pronunciation: [ʃazɛl syʁ alb]) is a commune in the Meurthe-et-Moselle department in north-eastern France.

== See also ==
- Communes of the Meurthe-et-Moselle department
