= Xures =

- Commune
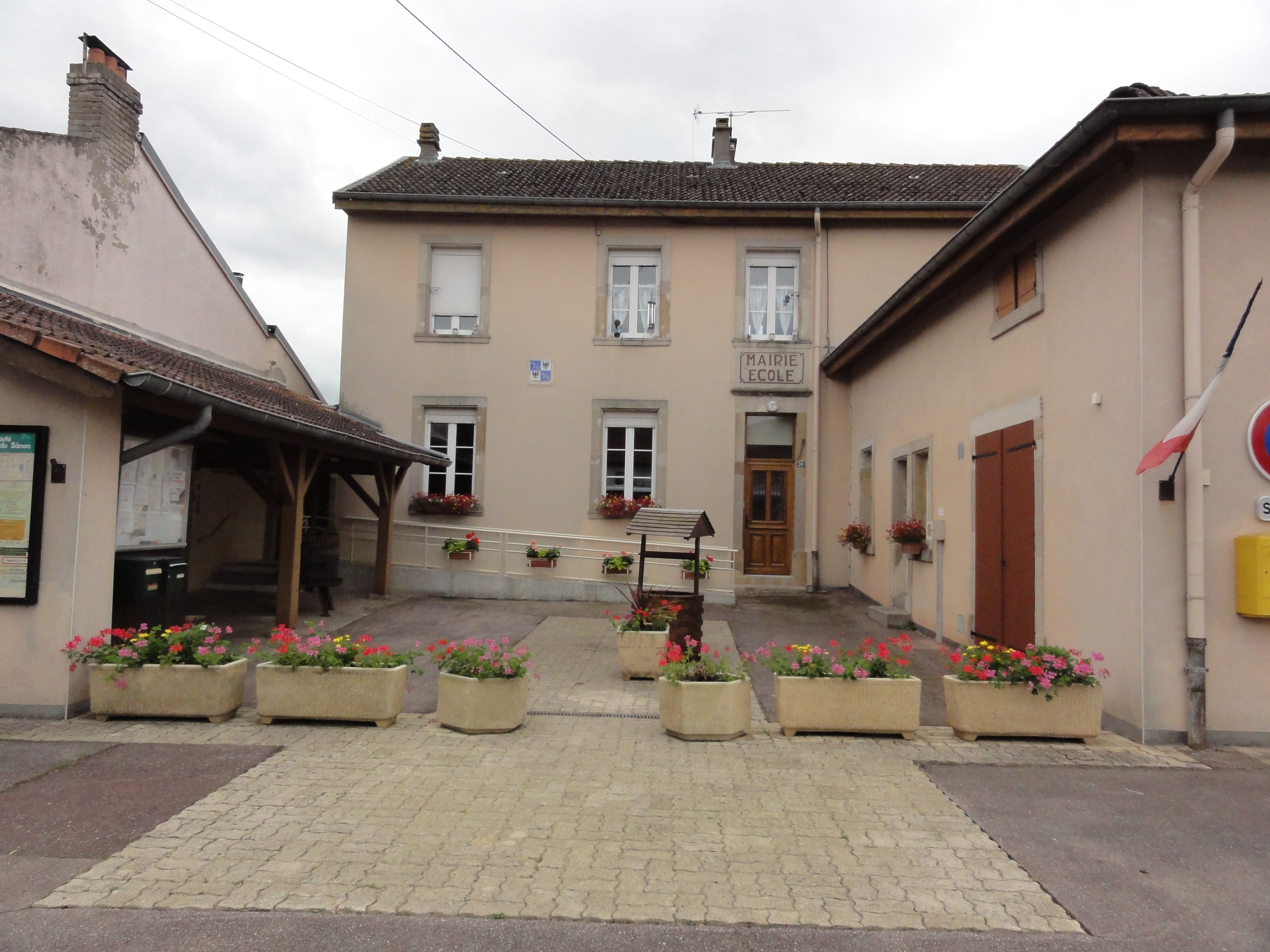
- The town hall and school in Xures

- Coat of arms
- Location of Xures
- Location within France Location within Grand Est
- Coordinates: 48°41′25″N 6°39′25″E
- Country: France
- Region: Grand Est
- Department: Meurthe-et-Moselle
- Arrondissement: Lunéville
- Canton: Baccarat
- Intercommunality: Pays du Sânon

Government
  - Mayor (2020–2026): René Wagner
- Area^{1}: 6.98 km^{2} (2.69 sq mi)
- Elevation: 250 m (820 ft)
- Highest elevation: 280 m (920 ft)
- Lowest elevation: 225 m (738 ft)
- Population (2023): 91
  - Density: 13/km^{2} (34/sq mi)
- Time zone: UTC+01:00 (CET)
  - Summer (DST): UTC+02:00 (CEST)
- INSEE/Postal code: 54601 /54370
- ^{1} French Land Register data, which excludes lakes, ponds, glaciers > 1 km^{2} (0.386 sq mi or 247 acres) and river estuaries.

Xures is a commune in the Meurthe-et-Moselle department in north-eastern France.

== Population ==
Historical population
Year	Pop.	±% p.a.
1968	173	—
1975	127	−4.32%
1982	114	−1.53%
1990	104	−1.14%
1999	121	+1.70%
2007	133	+1.19%
2012	124	−1.39%
2017	108	−2.73%
2023	91	−2.81%
Source: INSEE

== See also ==
- Communes of the Meurthe-et-Moselle department
