= Réchicourt-la-Petite =

- Commune
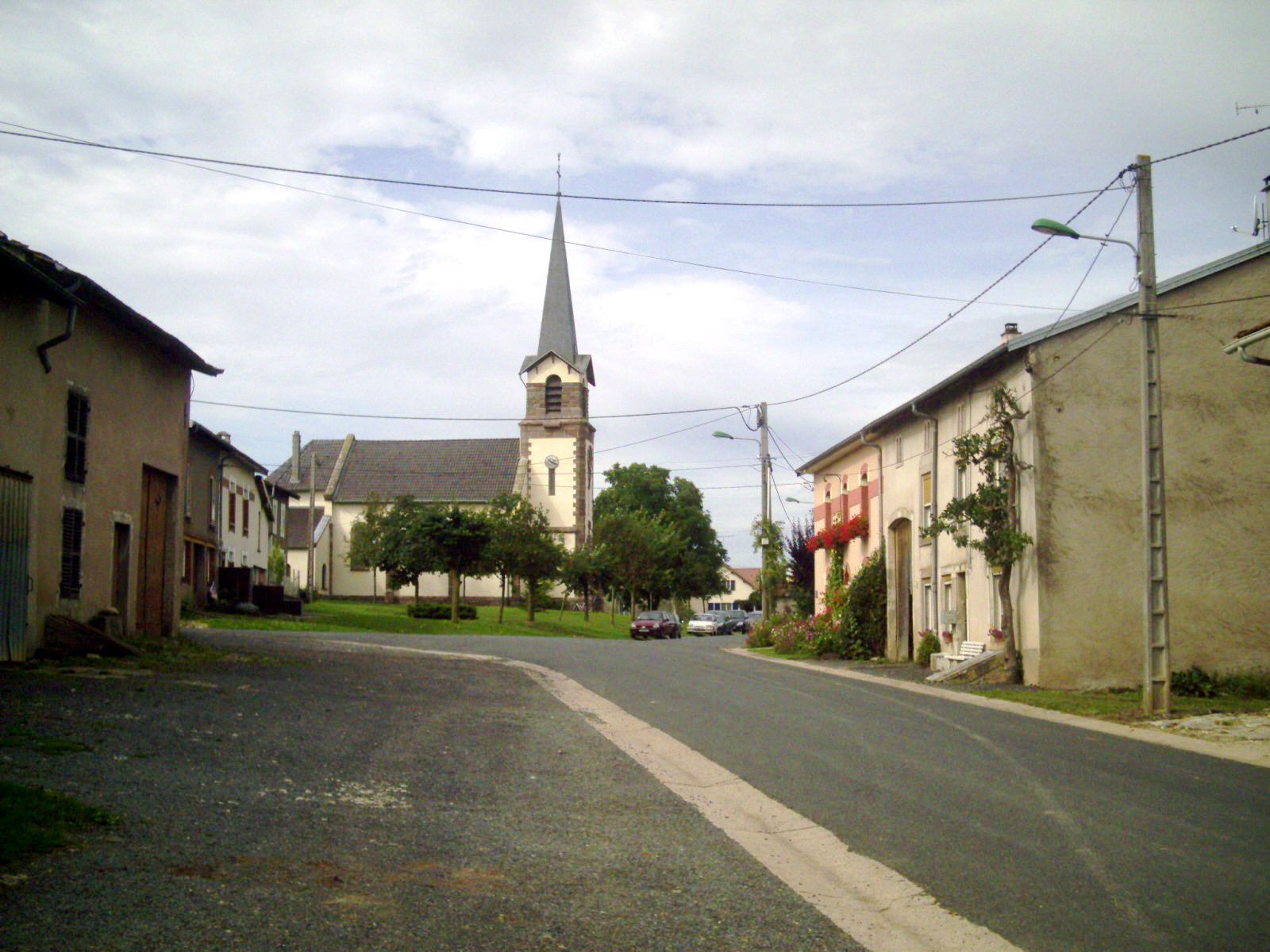
- The church in Réchicourt-la-Petite

- Coat of arms
- Location of Réchicourt-la-Petite
- Location within France Location within Grand Est
- Coordinates: 48°43′11″N 6°35′01″E
- Country: France
- Region: Grand Est
- Department: Meurthe-et-Moselle
- Arrondissement: Lunéville
- Canton: Baccarat
- Intercommunality: Pays du Sânon

Government
  - Mayor (2020–2026): Philippe Guillaumont
- Area^{1}: 5.5 km^{2} (2.1 sq mi)
- Elevation: 258 m (846 ft)
- Highest elevation: 313 m (1,027 ft)
- Lowest elevation: 228 m (748 ft)
- Population (2023): 61
  - Density: 11/km^{2} (29/sq mi)
- Time zone: UTC+01:00 (CET)
  - Summer (DST): UTC+02:00 (CEST)
- INSEE/Postal code: 54446 /54370
- ^{1} French Land Register data, which excludes lakes, ponds, glaciers > 1 km^{2} (0.386 sq mi or 247 acres) and river estuaries.

Réchicourt-la-Petite (French pronunciation: [ʁeʃikuʁ la pətit]) is a commune in the Meurthe-et-Moselle department in north-eastern France.

At a place called "le Haut des Ruelles" died the first 3 Americans on the field of France during World War 1.

== See also ==
- Communes of the Meurthe-et-Moselle department
