= Athienville =

- Commune
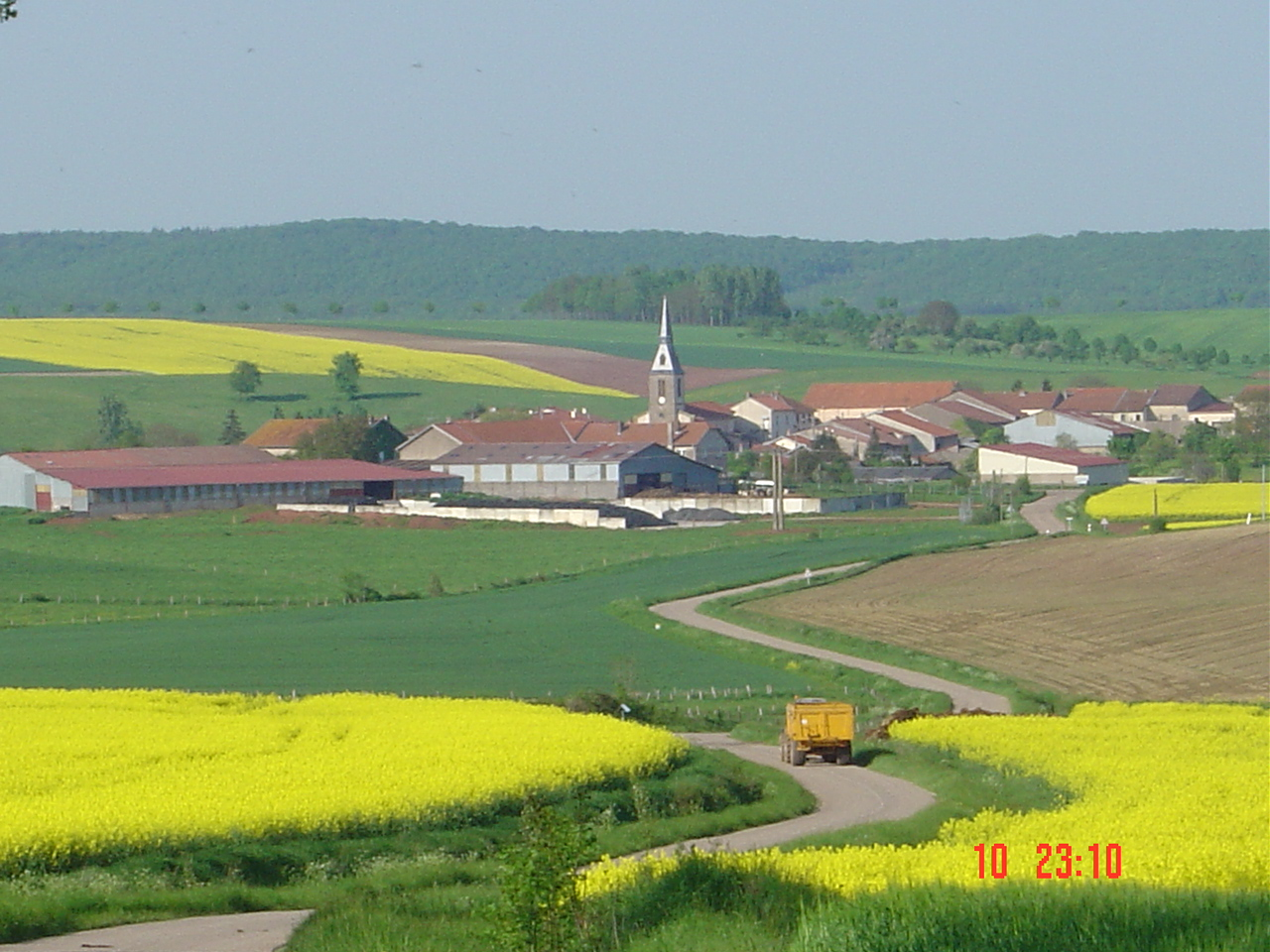
- A general view of Athienville

- Coat of arms
- Location of Athienville
- Location within France Location within Grand Est
- Coordinates: 48°43′00″N 6°29′29″E
- Country: France
- Region: Grand Est
- Department: Meurthe-et-Moselle
- Arrondissement: Lunéville
- Canton: Baccarat
- Intercommunality: CC Pays du Sânon

Government
  - Mayor (2020–2026): Stéphane Marchand
- Area^{1}: 12.96 km^{2} (5.00 sq mi)
- Elevation: 235 m (771 ft)
- Highest elevation: 335 m (1,099 ft)
- Lowest elevation: 212 m (696 ft)
- Population (2023): 163
  - Density: 12.6/km^{2} (32.6/sq mi)
- Time zone: UTC+01:00 (CET)
  - Summer (DST): UTC+02:00 (CEST)
- INSEE/Postal code: 54026 /54370
- ^{1} French Land Register data, which excludes lakes, ponds, glaciers > 1 km^{2} (0.386 sq mi or 247 acres) and river estuaries.

Athienville (French pronunciation: [atjɛ̃vil]) is a commune in the Meurthe-et-Moselle department in northeastern France.

== Population ==
Historical population
Year	Pop.	±% p.a.
1968	185	—
1975	160	−2.05%
1982	177	+1.45%
1990	182	+0.35%
1999	172	−0.63%
2007	163	−0.67%
2012	177	+1.66%
2017	176	−0.11%
2023	163	−1.27%
Source: INSEE

== See also ==
- Communes of the Meurthe-et-Moselle department
