= Halloville =

- Commune
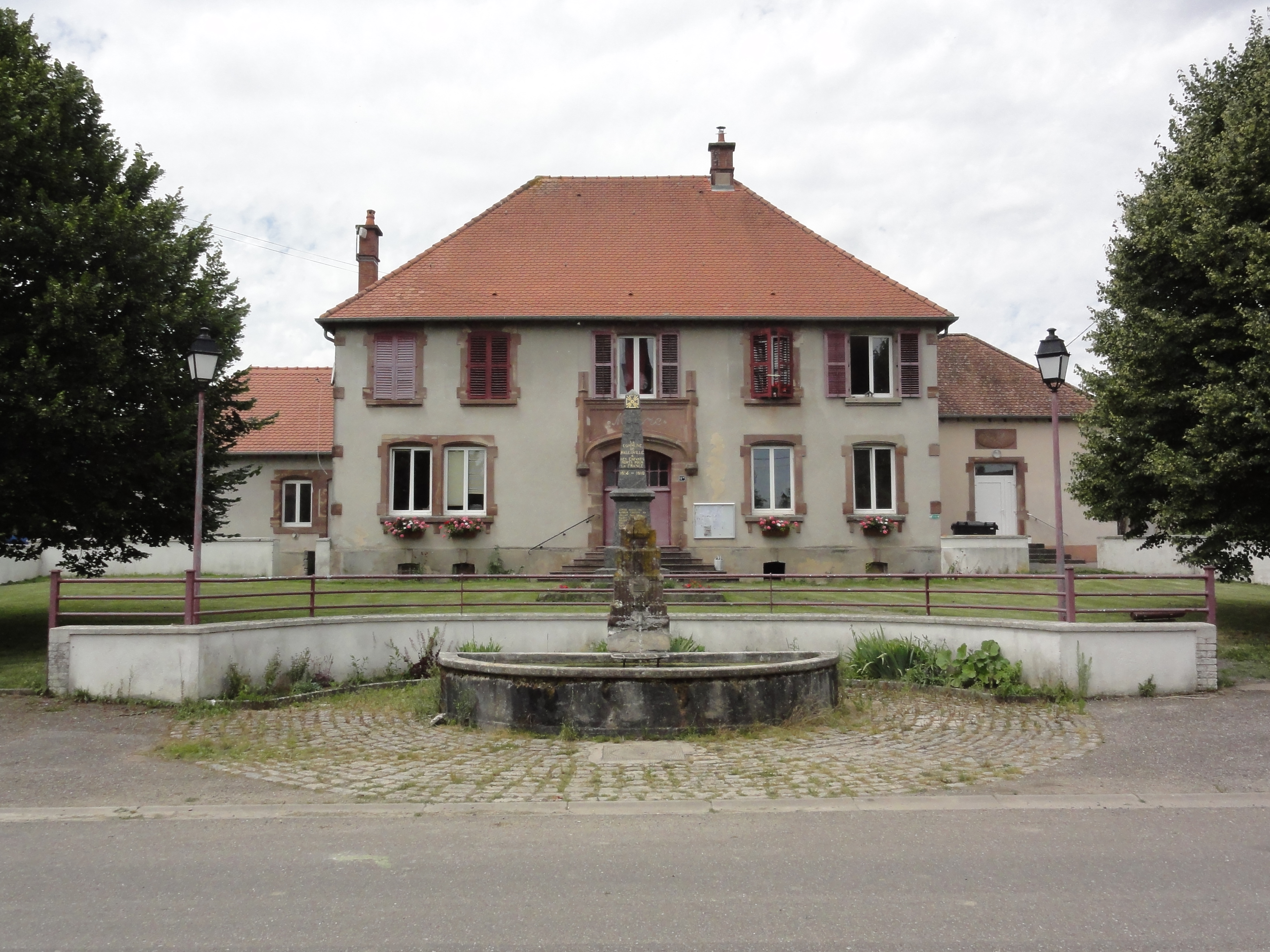
- The town hall in Halloville

- Coat of arms
- Location of Halloville
- Location within France Location within Grand Est
- Coordinates: 48°33′18″N 6°51′43″E
- Country: France
- Region: Grand Est
- Department: Meurthe-et-Moselle
- Arrondissement: Lunéville
- Canton: Baccarat

Government
  - Mayor (2020–2026): Pierre Monzein
- Area^{1}: 3.93 km^{2} (1.52 sq mi)
- Elevation: 290 m (950 ft)
- Highest elevation: 333 m (1,093 ft)
- Lowest elevation: 262 m (860 ft)
- Population (2023): 66
  - Density: 17/km^{2} (43/sq mi)
- Time zone: UTC+01:00 (CET)
  - Summer (DST): UTC+02:00 (CEST)
- INSEE/Postal code: 54246 /54450
- ^{1} French Land Register data, which excludes lakes, ponds, glaciers > 1 km^{2} (0.386 sq mi or 247 acres) and river estuaries.

Halloville (French pronunciation: [alɔvil]) is a commune in the Meurthe-et-Moselle department in north-eastern France.

== See also ==
- Communes of the Meurthe-et-Moselle department
