= Montreux, Meurthe-et-Moselle =

Montreux
- Commune
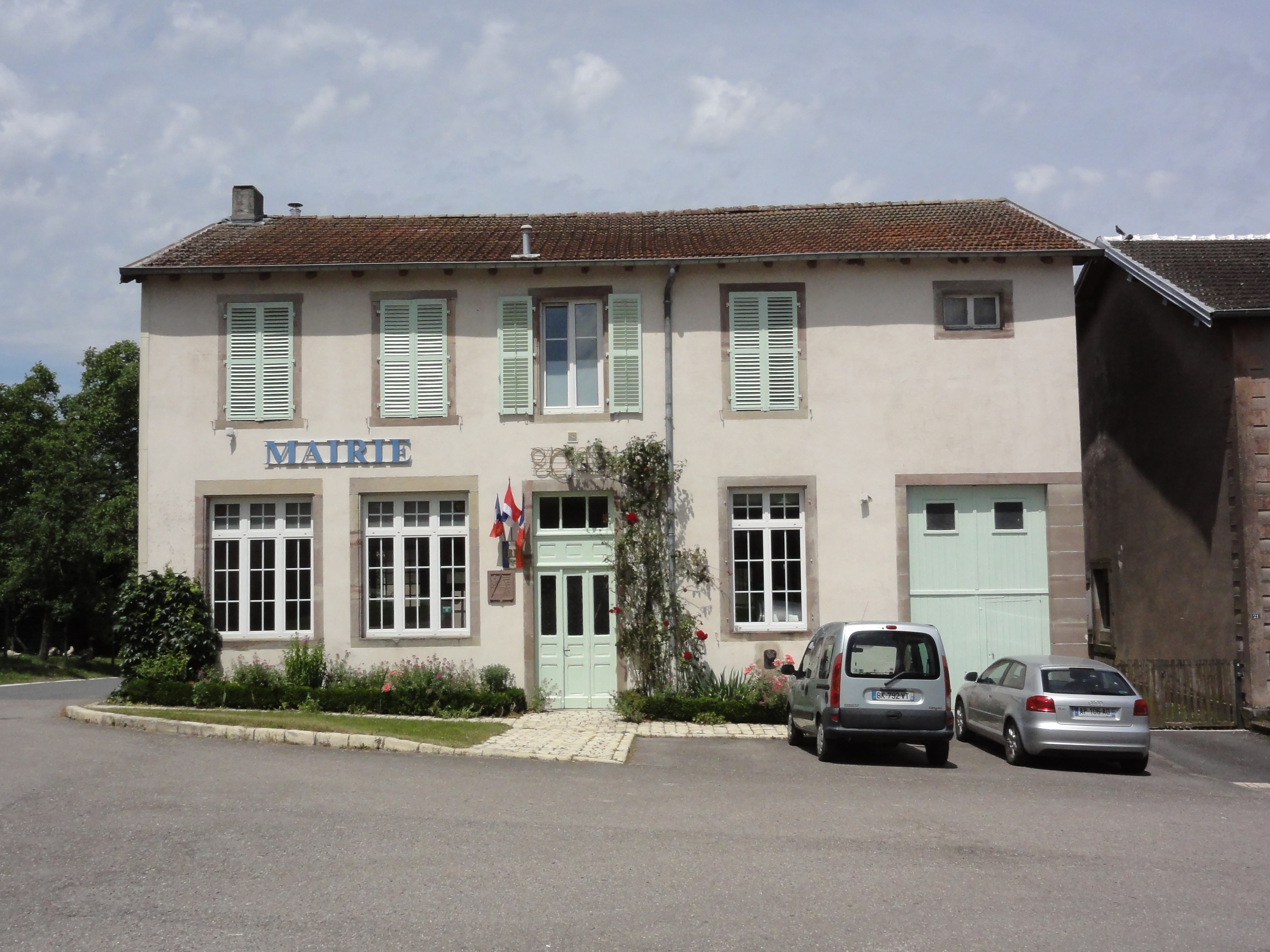
- The town hall in Montreux

- Coat of arms
- Location of Montreux
- Location within France Location within Grand Est
- Coordinates: 48°32′11″N 6°52′59″E
- Country: France
- Region: Grand Est
- Department: Meurthe-et-Moselle
- Arrondissement: Lunéville
- Canton: Baccarat

Government
  - Mayor (2020–2026): Marie-Hélène Humbert
- Area^{1}: 3.69 km^{2} (1.42 sq mi)
- Elevation: 298 m (978 ft)
- Highest elevation: 345 m (1,132 ft)
- Lowest elevation: 277 m (909 ft)
- Population (2023): 50
  - Density: 14/km^{2} (35/sq mi)
- Time zone: UTC+01:00 (CET)
  - Summer (DST): UTC+02:00 (CEST)
- INSEE/Postal code: 54381 /54450
- ^{1} French Land Register data, which excludes lakes, ponds, glaciers > 1 km^{2} (0.386 sq mi or 247 acres) and river estuaries.

Montreux (French pronunciation: [mɔ̃tʁø]) is a commune in the Meurthe-et-Moselle department in north-eastern France.

== See also ==
- Communes of the Meurthe-et-Moselle department
