= Repaix =

- Commune
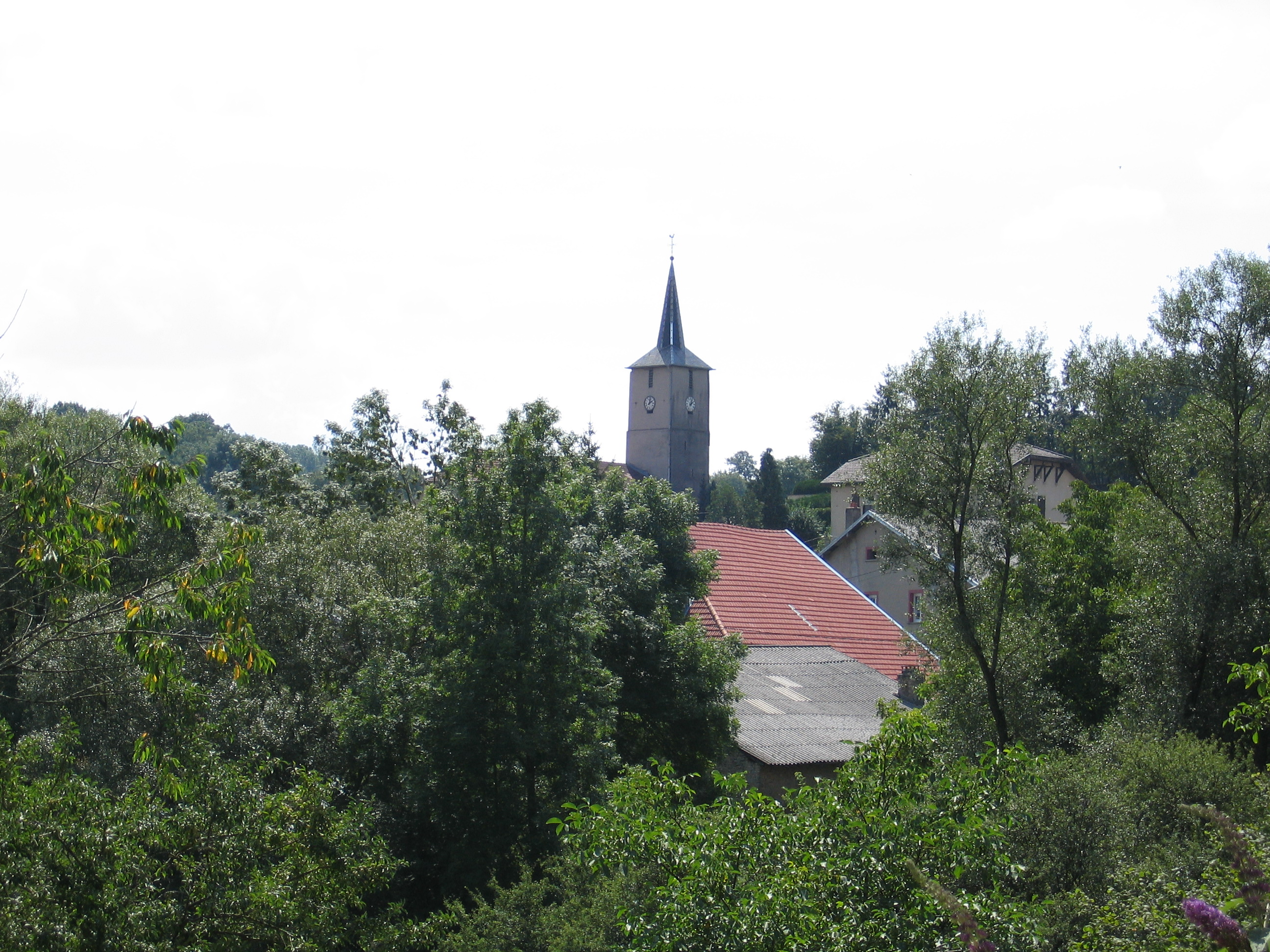
- The village of Repaix

- Coat of arms
- Location of Repaix
- Location within France Location within Grand Est
- Coordinates: 48°36′31″N 6°50′01″E
- Country: France
- Region: Grand Est
- Department: Meurthe-et-Moselle
- Arrondissement: Lunéville
- Canton: Baccarat

Government
  - Mayor (2020–2026): Michel Marcel
- Area^{1}: 4.86 km^{2} (1.88 sq mi)
- Elevation: 300 m (980 ft)
- Highest elevation: 353 m (1,158 ft)
- Lowest elevation: 279 m (915 ft)
- Population (2023): 105
  - Density: 21.6/km^{2} (56.0/sq mi)
- Time zone: UTC+01:00 (CET)
  - Summer (DST): UTC+02:00 (CEST)
- INSEE/Postal code: 54458 /54450
- ^{1} French Land Register data, which excludes lakes, ponds, glaciers > 1 km^{2} (0.386 sq mi or 247 acres) and river estuaries.

Repaix (French pronunciation: [ʁəpɛ]) is a commune in the Meurthe-et-Moselle department in north-eastern France. In 1999, the village had 84 inhabitants.

It has an Anabaptist graveyard of the 19th century (photo).

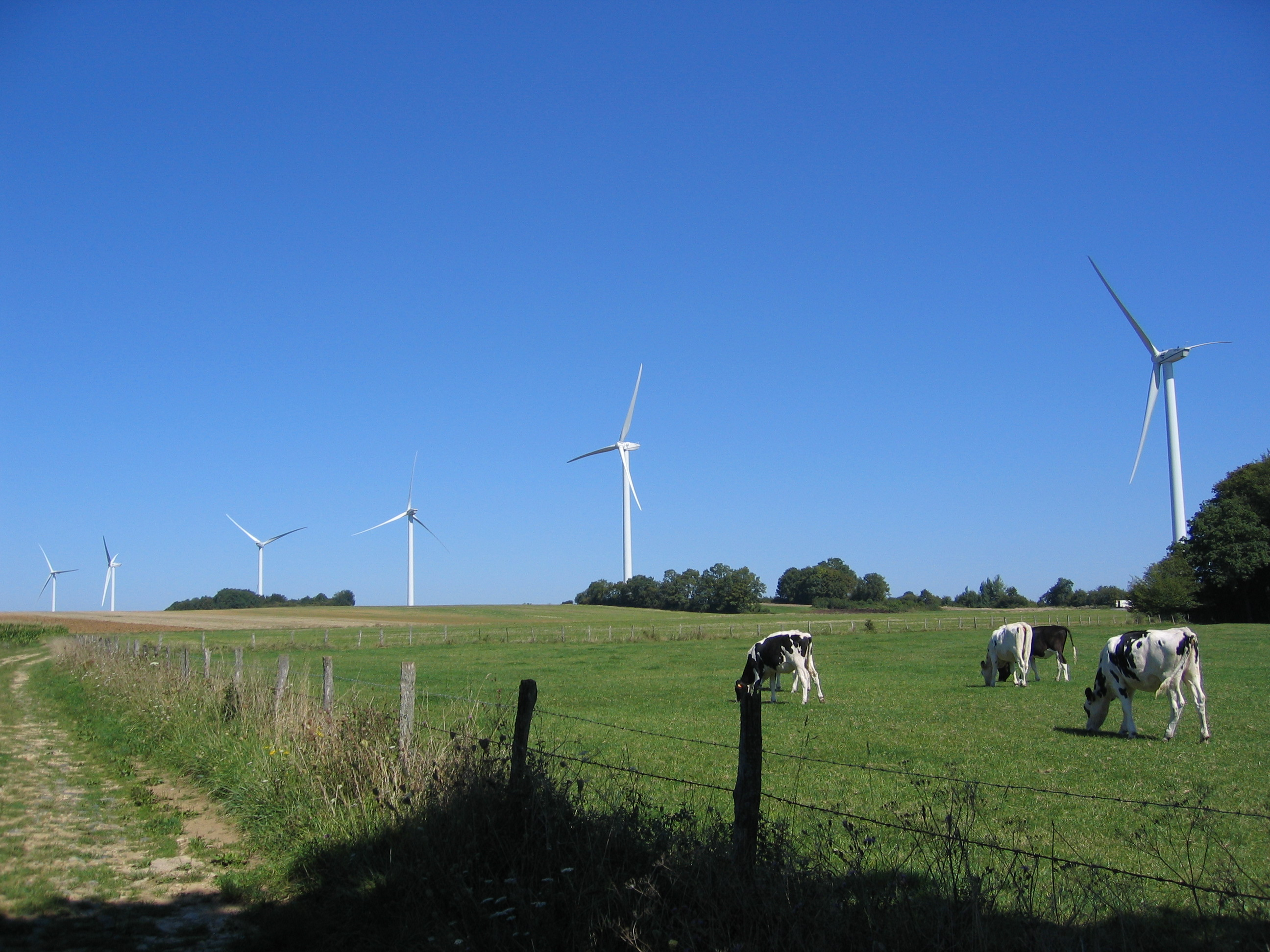
Wind turbines of Repaix

== See also ==
- Communes of the Meurthe-et-Moselle department
