= Bures, Meurthe-et-Moselle =

Bures
- Commune
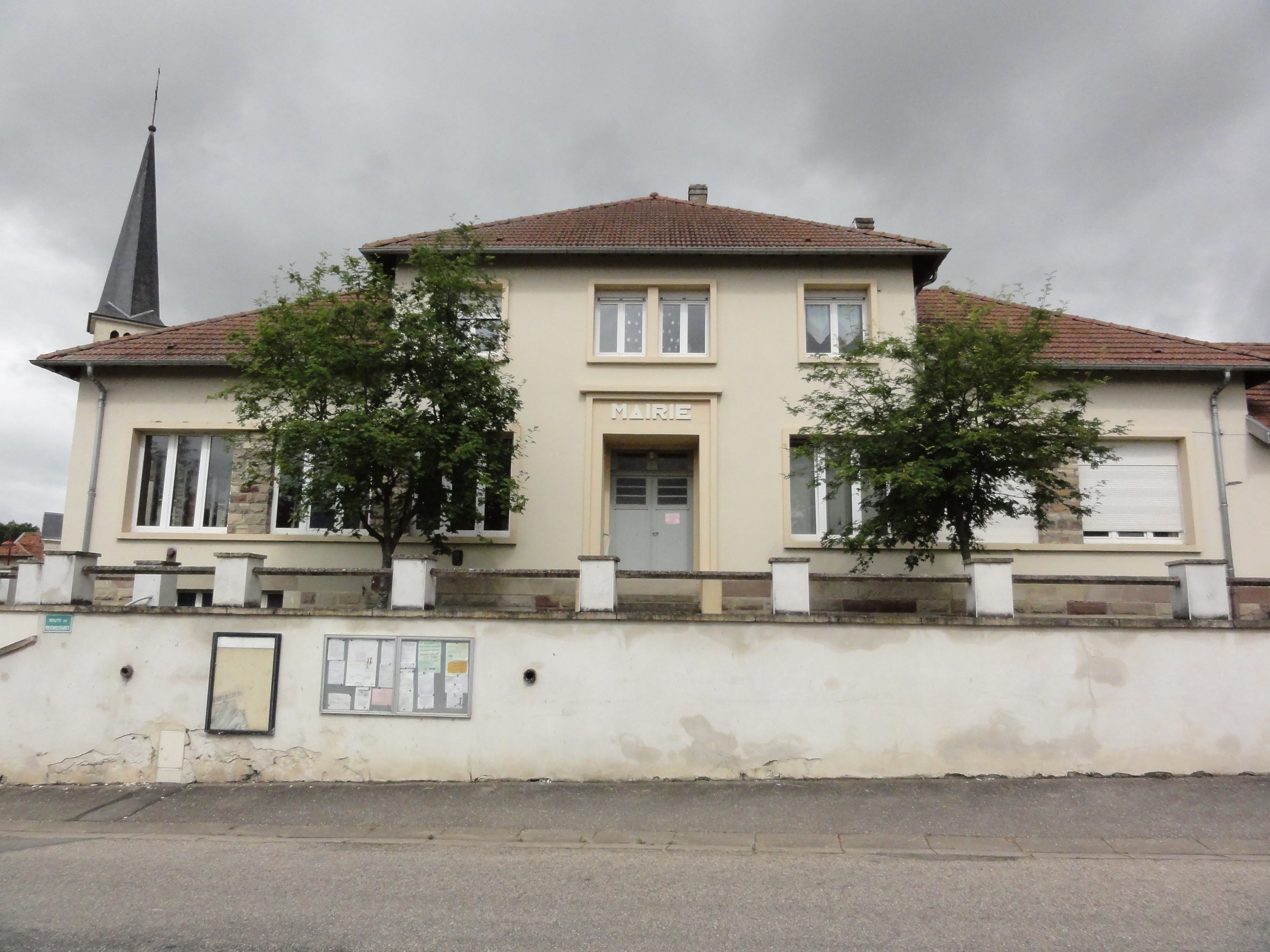
- The town hall in Bures
- Location of Bures
- Location within France Location within Grand Est
- Coordinates: 48°41′42″N 6°34′37″E
- Country: France
- Region: Grand Est
- Department: Meurthe-et-Moselle
- Arrondissement: Lunéville
- Canton: Baccarat
- Intercommunality: Pays du Sânon

Government
  - Mayor (2020–2026): Marie-Laure Marchal
- Area^{1}: 5.74 km^{2} (2.22 sq mi)
- Elevation: 245 m (804 ft)
- Highest elevation: 315 m (1,033 ft)
- Lowest elevation: 227 m (745 ft)
- Population (2023): 64
  - Density: 11/km^{2} (29/sq mi)
- Time zone: UTC+01:00 (CET)
  - Summer (DST): UTC+02:00 (CEST)
- INSEE/Postal code: 54106 /54370
- ^{1} French Land Register data, which excludes lakes, ponds, glaciers > 1 km^{2} (0.386 sq mi or 247 acres) and river estuaries.

Bures (French pronunciation: [byʁ]) is a commune in the Meurthe-et-Moselle department in northeastern France.

== Population ==
Historical population
Year	Pop.	±% p.a.
1968	55	—
1975	61	+1.49%
1982	55	−1.47%
1990	45	−2.48%
1999	51	+1.40%
2007	67	+3.47%
2012	72	+1.45%
2017	62	−2.95%
2023	64	+0.53%
Source: INSEE

== See also ==
- Communes of the Meurthe-et-Moselle department
