= Saint-Martin, Meurthe-et-Moselle =

Saint-Martin
- Commune
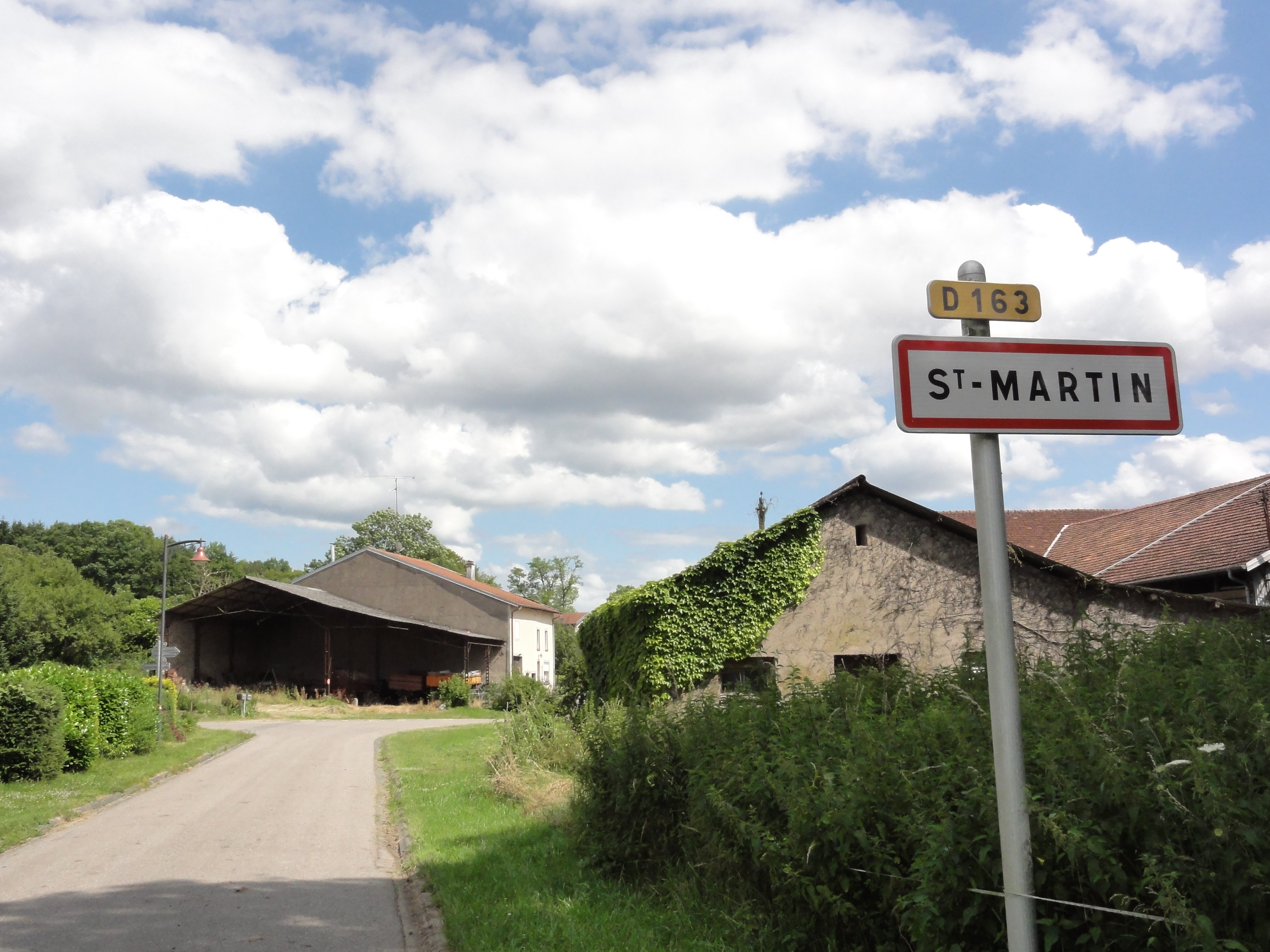
- The road into Saint-Martin

- Coat of arms
- Location of Saint-Martin
- Location within France Location within Grand Est
- Coordinates: 48°34′08″N 6°45′13″E
- Country: France
- Region: Grand Est
- Department: Meurthe-et-Moselle
- Arrondissement: Lunéville
- Canton: Baccarat

Government
  - Mayor (2020–2026): Frédéric Maillot
- Area^{1}: 4.87 km^{2} (1.88 sq mi)
- Elevation: 240 m (790 ft)
- Highest elevation: 301 m (988 ft)
- Lowest elevation: 241 m (791 ft)
- Population (2023): 53
  - Density: 11/km^{2} (28/sq mi)
- Time zone: UTC+01:00 (CET)
  - Summer (DST): UTC+02:00 (CEST)
- INSEE/Postal code: 54480 /54450
- ^{1} French Land Register data, which excludes lakes, ponds, glaciers > 1 km^{2} (0.386 sq mi or 247 acres) and river estuaries.

Saint-Martin (French pronunciation: [sɛ̃ maʁtɛ̃]) is a commune in the Meurthe-et-Moselle department in north-eastern France.

== See also ==
- Communes of the Meurthe-et-Moselle department
