= Reillon =

- Commune
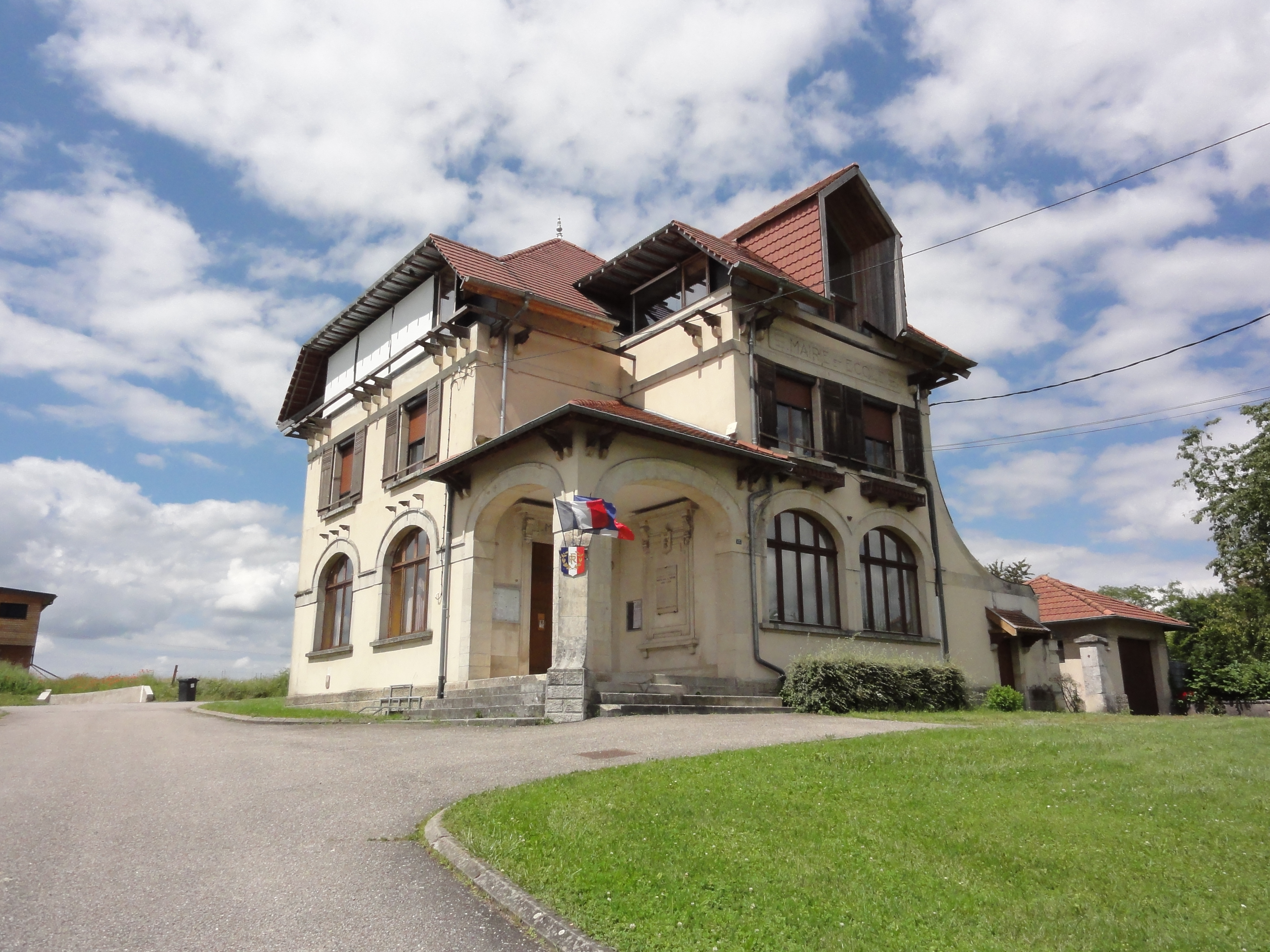
- The town hall and school in Reillon

- Coat of arms
- Location of Reillon
- Location within France Location within Grand Est
- Coordinates: 48°35′57″N 6°44′39″E
- Country: France
- Region: Grand Est
- Department: Meurthe-et-Moselle
- Arrondissement: Lunéville
- Canton: Baccarat

Government
  - Mayor (2020–2026): Damien Jacquot
- Area^{1}: 4.39 km^{2} (1.69 sq mi)
- Elevation: 273 m (896 ft)
- Highest elevation: 292 m (958 ft)
- Lowest elevation: 247 m (810 ft)
- Population (2023): 73
  - Density: 17/km^{2} (43/sq mi)
- Time zone: UTC+01:00 (CET)
  - Summer (DST): UTC+02:00 (CEST)
- INSEE/Postal code: 54452 /54450
- ^{1} French Land Register data, which excludes lakes, ponds, glaciers > 1 km^{2} (0.386 sq mi or 247 acres) and river estuaries.

Reillon (French pronunciation: [ʁɛjɔ̃]) is a commune in the Meurthe-et-Moselle department in north-eastern France.

== See also ==
- Communes of the Meurthe-et-Moselle department
