= Harbouey =

- Commune
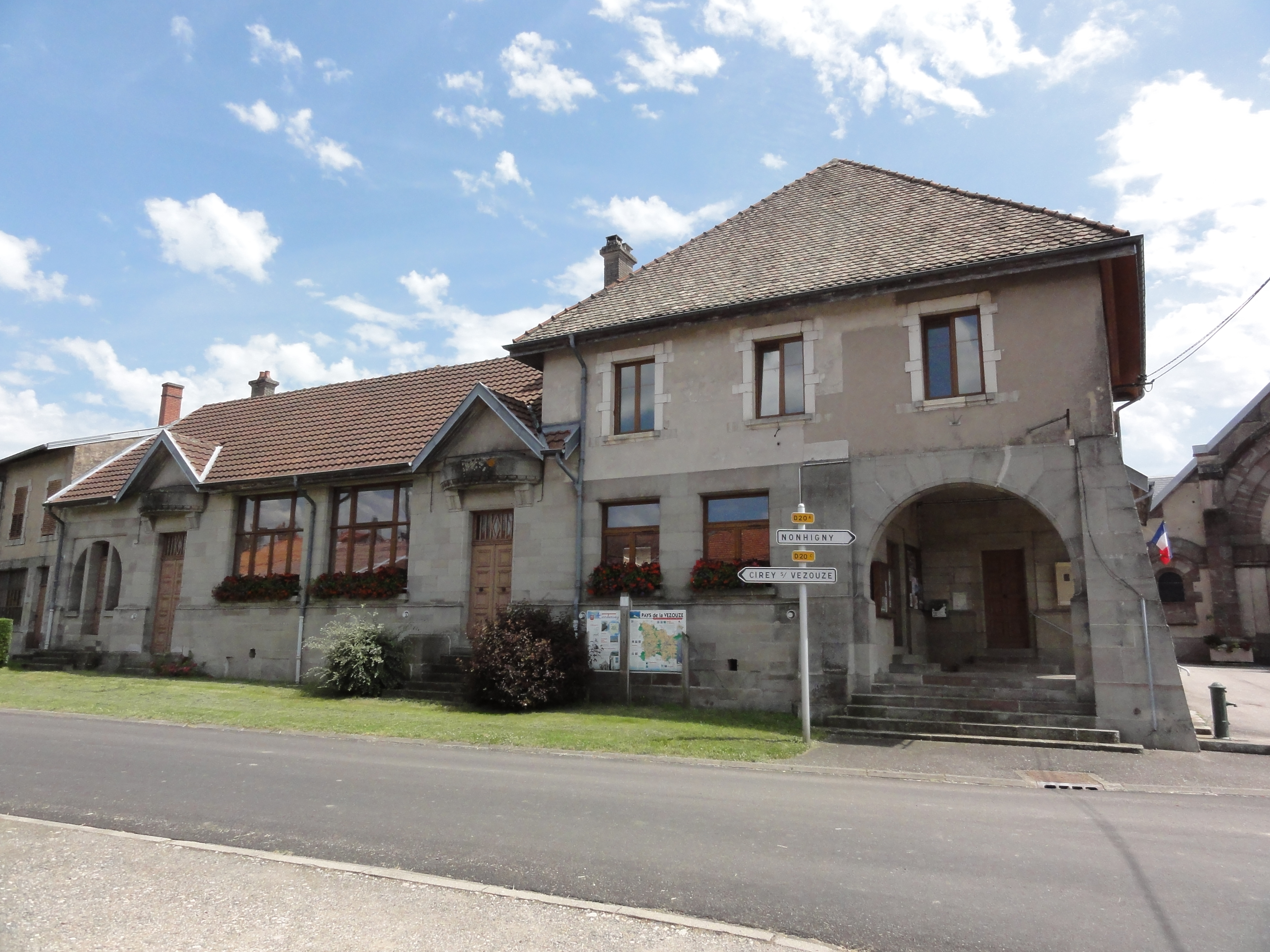
- The town hall and school in Harbouey

- Coat of arms
- Location of Harbouey
- Location within France Location within Grand Est
- Coordinates: 48°34′14″N 6°53′15″E
- Country: France
- Region: Grand Est
- Department: Meurthe-et-Moselle
- Arrondissement: Lunéville
- Canton: Baccarat

Government
  - Mayor (2020–2026): André Thiebo
- Area^{1}: 10.14 km^{2} (3.92 sq mi)
- Elevation: 310 m (1,020 ft)
- Highest elevation: 313 m (1,027 ft)
- Lowest elevation: 261 m (856 ft)
- Population (2023): 136
  - Density: 13.4/km^{2} (34.7/sq mi)
- Time zone: UTC+01:00 (CET)
  - Summer (DST): UTC+02:00 (CEST)
- INSEE/Postal code: 54251 /54450
- ^{1} French Land Register data, which excludes lakes, ponds, glaciers > 1 km^{2} (0.386 sq mi or 247 acres) and river estuaries.

Harbouey (French pronunciation: [aʁbwɛ]) is a commune in the Meurthe-et-Moselle department in north-eastern France.

== See also ==
- Communes of the Meurthe-et-Moselle department
