= Petitmont =

- Commune
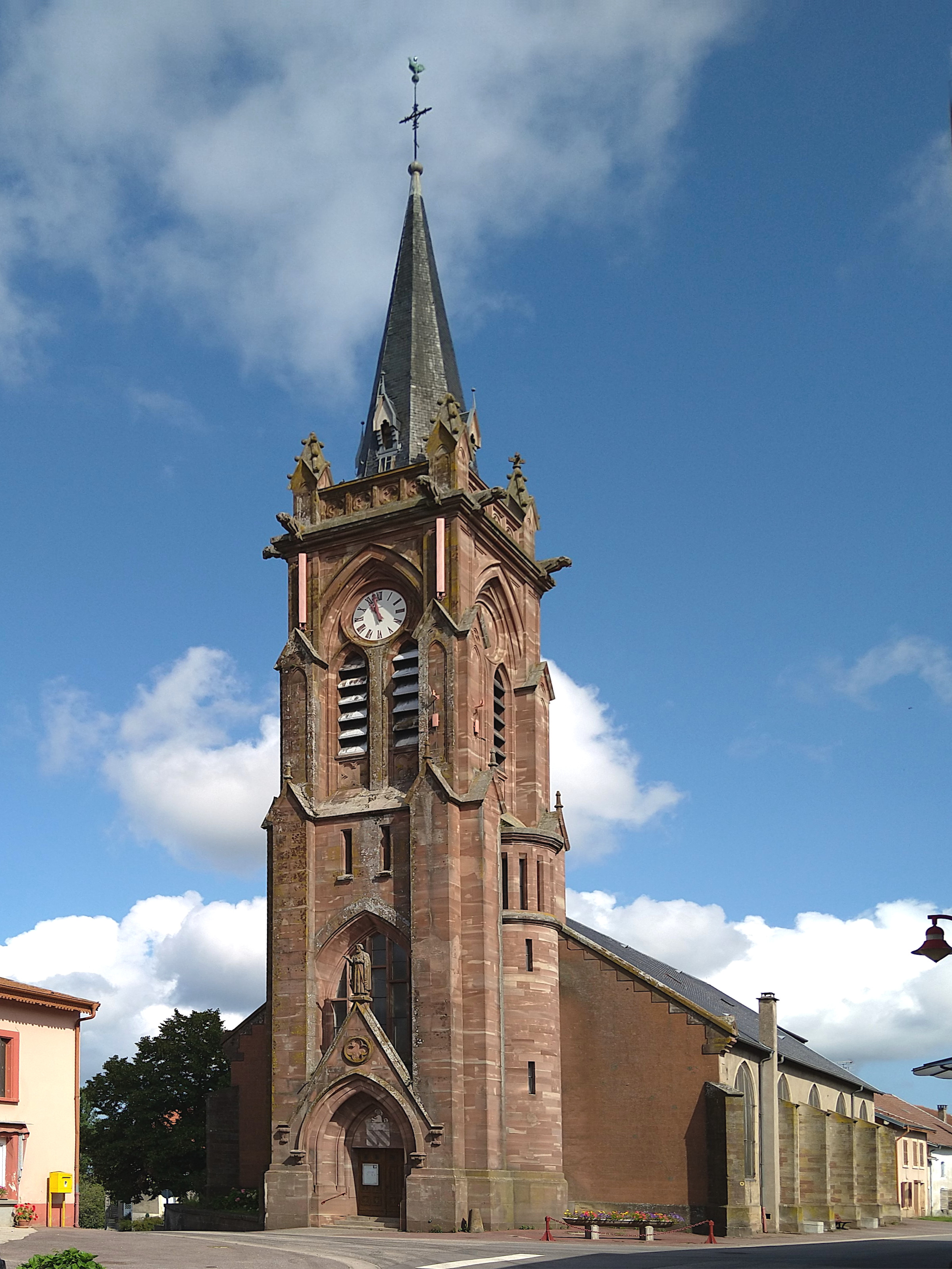
- Petitmont (54) - Église saint-Pierre

- Coat of arms
- Location of Petitmont
- Location within France Location within Grand Est
- Coordinates: 48°33′29″N 6°57′27″E
- Country: France
- Region: Grand Est
- Department: Meurthe-et-Moselle
- Arrondissement: Lunéville
- Canton: Baccarat
- Intercommunality: CC de Vezouze en Piémont

Government
  - Mayor (2020–2026): Fabrice Poirette
- Area^{1}: 17.6 km^{2} (6.8 sq mi)
- Elevation: 368 m (1,207 ft)
- Highest elevation: 690 m (2,260 ft)
- Lowest elevation: 291 m (955 ft)
- Population (2023): 305
  - Density: 17.3/km^{2} (44.9/sq mi)
- Time zone: UTC+01:00 (CET)
  - Summer (DST): UTC+02:00 (CEST)
- INSEE/Postal code: 54421 /54480
- ^{1} French Land Register data, which excludes lakes, ponds, glaciers > 1 km^{2} (0.386 sq mi or 247 acres) and river estuaries.

Petitmont (French pronunciation: [pətimɔ̃]) is a commune in the Meurthe-et-Moselle department in north-eastern France.

== See also ==
- Communes of the Meurthe-et-Moselle department
