= Igney, Meurthe-et-Moselle =

Igney
- Commune
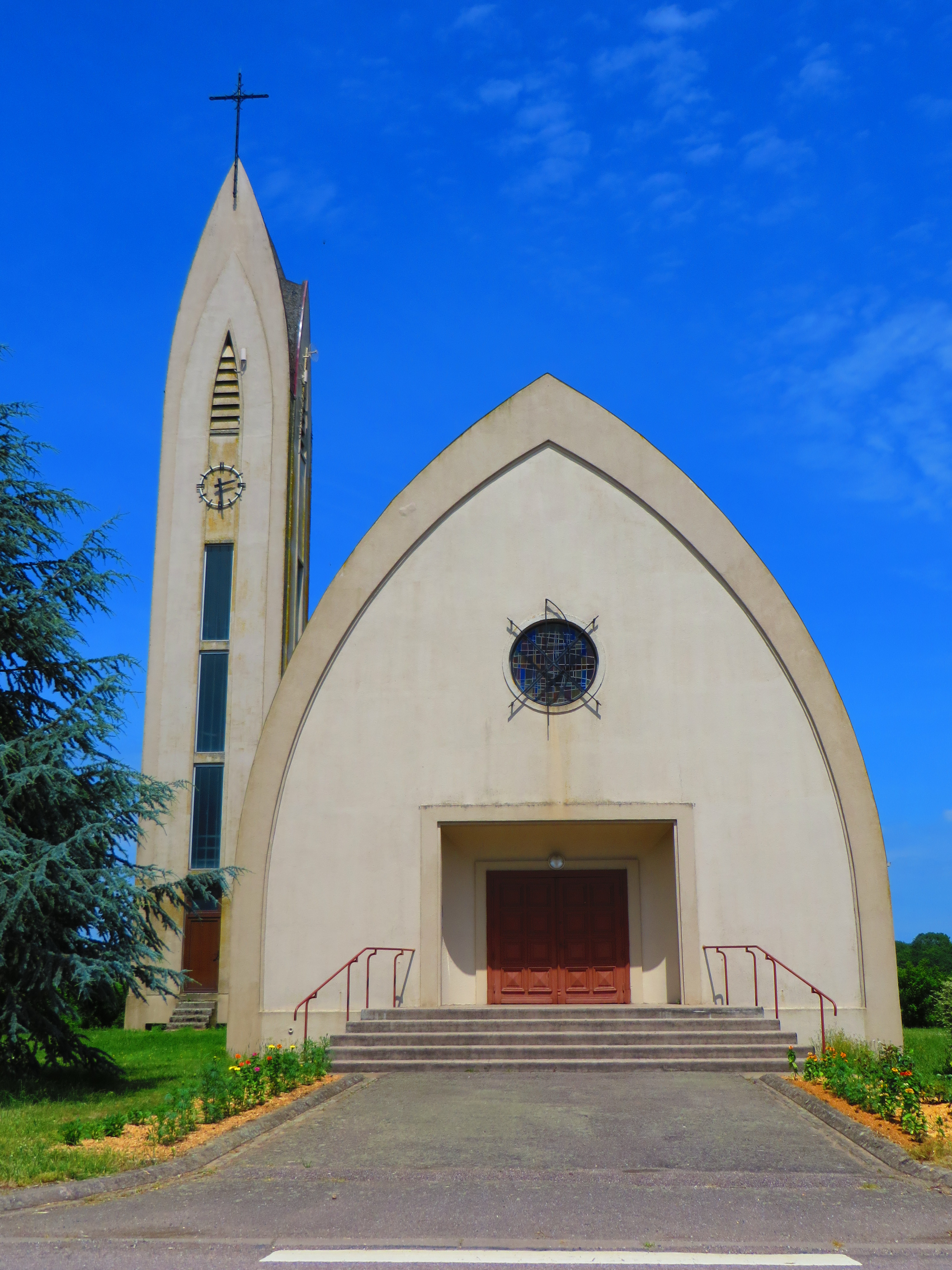
- The church in Igney

- Coat of arms
- Location of Igney
- Location within France Location within Grand Est
- Coordinates: 48°38′05″N 6°48′52″E
- Country: France
- Region: Grand Est
- Department: Meurthe-et-Moselle
- Arrondissement: Lunéville
- Canton: Baccarat
- Intercommunality: Vezouze en Piémont

Government
  - Mayor (2022–2026): Evelyne Verdenal
- Area^{1}: 4.71 km^{2} (1.82 sq mi)
- Elevation: 350 m (1,150 ft)
- Highest elevation: 354 m (1,161 ft)
- Lowest elevation: 296 m (971 ft)
- Population (2023): 109
  - Density: 23.1/km^{2} (59.9/sq mi)
- Time zone: UTC+01:00 (CET)
  - Summer (DST): UTC+02:00 (CEST)
- INSEE/Postal code: 54271 /54450
- ^{1} French Land Register data, which excludes lakes, ponds, glaciers > 1 km^{2} (0.386 sq mi or 247 acres) and river estuaries.

Igney (French pronunciation: [iɲɛ]) is a commune in the Meurthe-et-Moselle department in north-eastern France.

== Population ==
Historical population
| Year | Pop. | ±% p.a. |
|---|---|---|
| 1968 | 168 | — |
| 1975 | 160 | −0.69% |
| 1982 | 143 | −1.59% |
| 1990 | 141 | −0.18% |
| 1999 | 127 | −1.16% |
| 2007 | 113 | −1.45% |
| 2012 | 126 | +2.20% |
| 2017 | 124 | −0.32% |
| 2023 | 109 | −2.13% |
Source: INSEE

== See also ==
- Communes of the Meurthe-et-Moselle department
