= Blémerey, Meurthe-et-Moselle =

Blémerey
- Commune
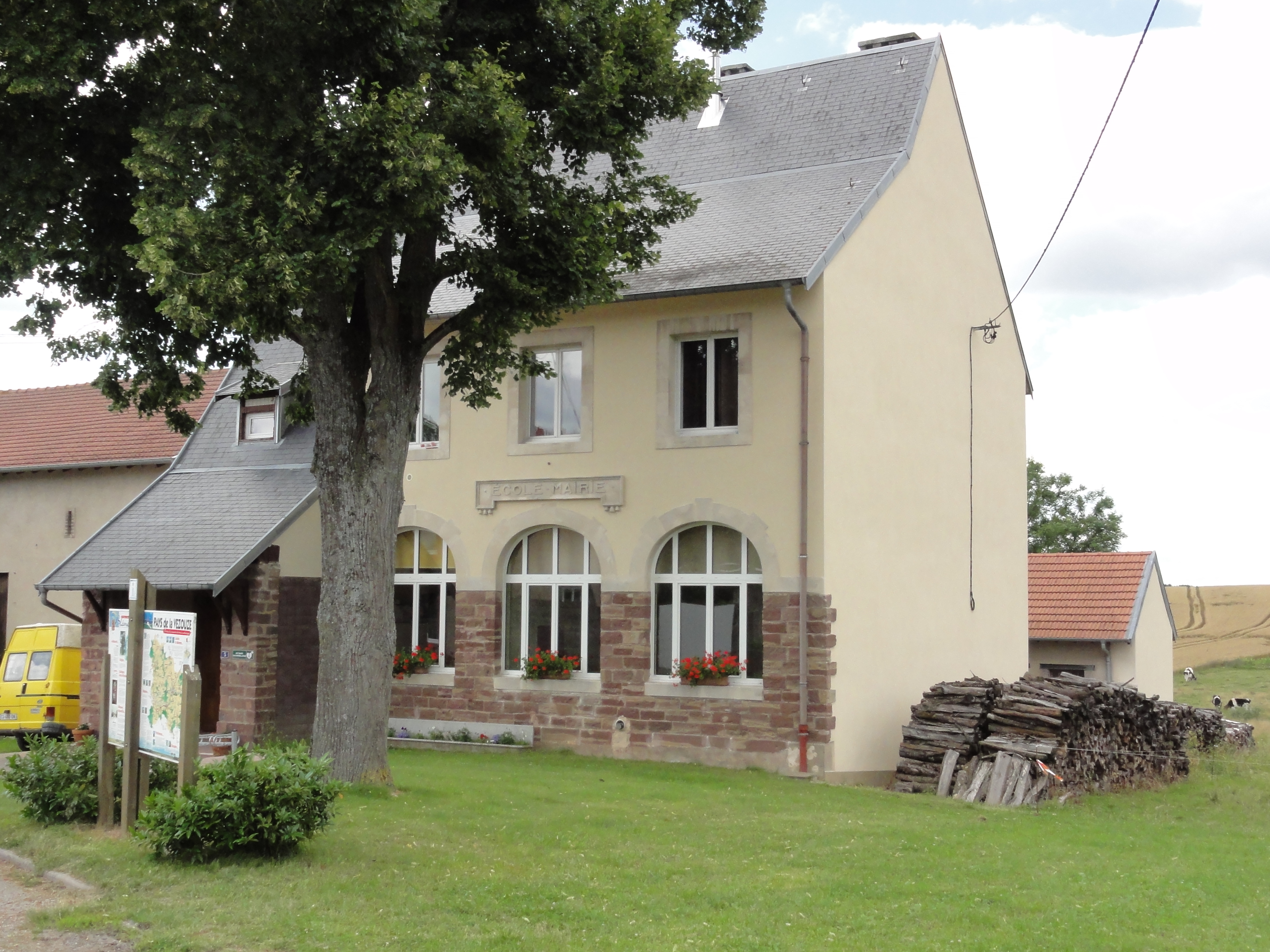
- The town hall in Blémerey

- Coat of arms
- Location of Blémerey
- Location within France Location within Grand Est
- Coordinates: 48°35′02″N 6°44′06″E
- Country: France
- Region: Grand Est
- Department: Meurthe-et-Moselle
- Arrondissement: Lunéville
- Canton: Baccarat

Government
  - Mayor (2020–2026): Gérard Patoux
- Area^{1}: 3.82 km^{2} (1.47 sq mi)
- Elevation: 266 m (873 ft)
- Highest elevation: 287 m (942 ft)
- Lowest elevation: 242 m (794 ft)
- Population (2023): 56
  - Density: 15/km^{2} (38/sq mi)
- Time zone: UTC+01:00 (CET)
  - Summer (DST): UTC+02:00 (CEST)
- INSEE/Postal code: 54078 /54450
- ^{1} French Land Register data, which excludes lakes, ponds, glaciers > 1 km^{2} (0.386 sq mi or 247 acres) and river estuaries.

Blémerey is a commune in the Meurthe-et-Moselle department in northeastern France.

== Population ==
Historical population
Year	Pop.	±% p.a.
1968	50	—
1975	49	−0.29%
1982	56	+1.93%
1990	58	+0.44%
1999	58	+0.00%
2007	52	−1.36%
2012	65	+4.56%
2017	63	−0.62%
2023	56	−1.94%
Source: INSEE

== See also ==
- Communes of the Meurthe-et-Moselle department
