= Canton of Badonviller =

Former canton in Meurthe-et-Moselle, France

Coordinates: 48°29′30″N 6°51′58″E

- Former canton
- Location of the canton in the arrondissement of Lunéville
- Country: France
- Region: Grand Est
- Department: Meurthe-et-Moselle
- No. of communes: {{{nbcomm}}}
- Disbanded: 2015

Government
  - Representatives: Bernard Muller
- Area: 121 km^{2} (47 sq mi)
- Population (2012): 3,194
  - Density: 26.4/km^{2} (68.4/sq mi)

The canton of Badonviller (French: Canton de Badonviller) is a former French canton located in the department of Meurthe-et-Moselle in the Lorraine region (now part of Grand Est). This canton was organized around Badonviller in the arrondissement of Lunéville. It is now part of the canton of Baccarat.

The last general councillor from this canton was Bernard Muller (UMP), elected in 1998.

== Composition ==
The canton of Badonviller grouped together 12 municipalities and had 3,194 inhabitants (2012 census without double counts).

1. Angomont
2. Badonviller
3. Bionville
4. Bréménil
5. Fenneviller
6. Neufmaisons
7. Neuviller-lès-Badonviller
8. Pexonne
9. Pierre-Percée
10. Raon-lès-Leau
11. Saint-Maurice-aux-Forges
12. Sainte-Pôle
