= Barbas, Meurthe-et-Moselle =

Barbas
- Commune
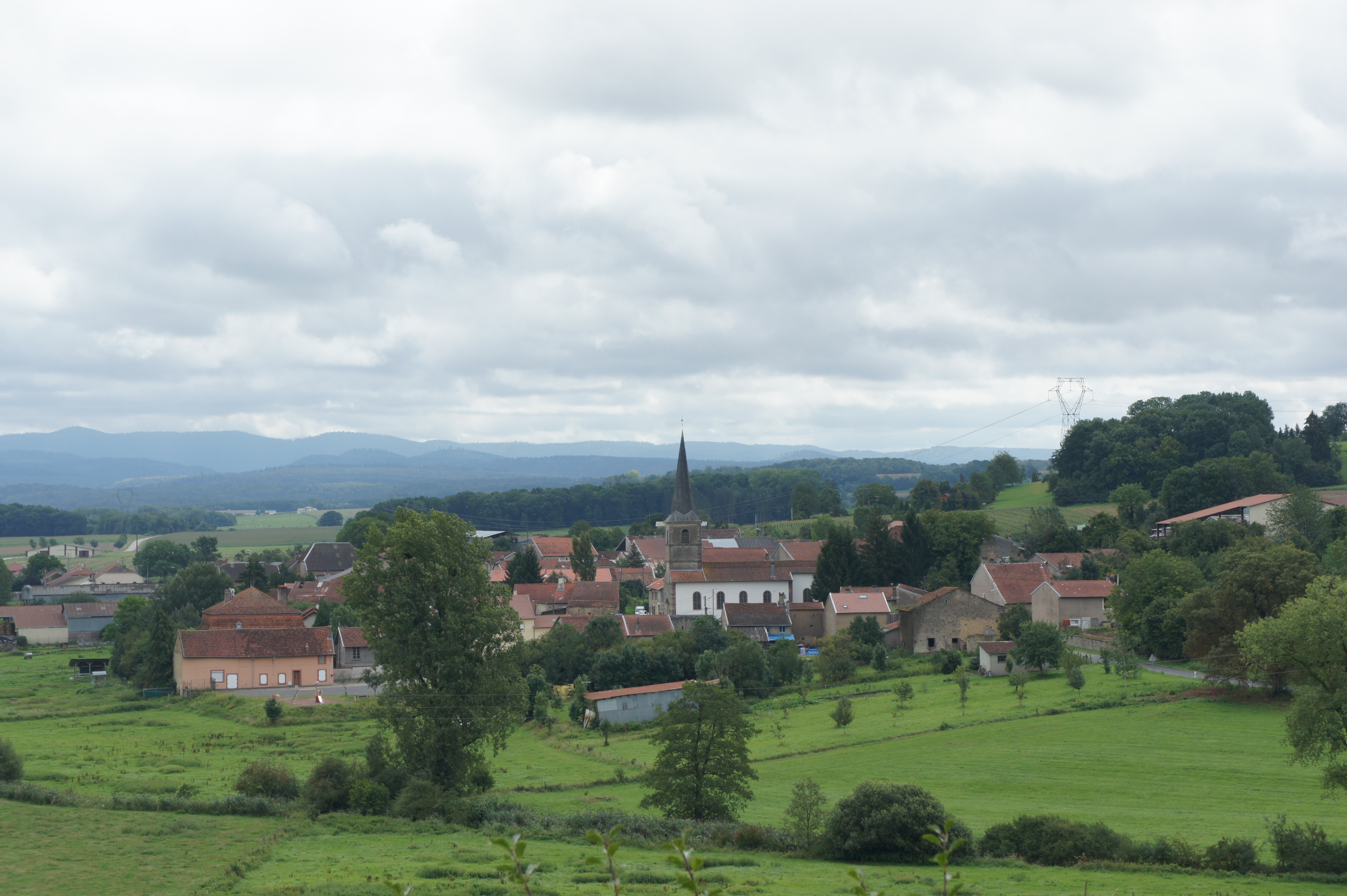
- The general view of Barbas

- Coat of arms
- Location of Barbas
- Location within France Location within Grand Est
- Coordinates: 48°34′26″N 6°50′52″E
- Country: France
- Region: Grand Est
- Department: Meurthe-et-Moselle
- Arrondissement: Lunéville
- Canton: Baccarat

Government
  - Mayor (2020–2026): Gérard Cousteur
- Area^{1}: 7.33 km^{2} (2.83 sq mi)
- Elevation: 270 m (890 ft)
- Highest elevation: 318 m (1,043 ft)
- Lowest elevation: 257 m (843 ft)
- Population (2023): 204
  - Density: 27.8/km^{2} (72.1/sq mi)
- Time zone: UTC+01:00 (CET)
  - Summer (DST): UTC+02:00 (CEST)
- INSEE/Postal code: 54044 /54450
- ^{1} French Land Register data, which excludes lakes, ponds, glaciers > 1 km^{2} (0.386 sq mi or 247 acres) and river estuaries.

Barbas is a commune in the Meurthe-et-Moselle department in northeastern France.

== See also ==
- Communes of the Meurthe-et-Moselle department
