= Fréménil =

- Commune
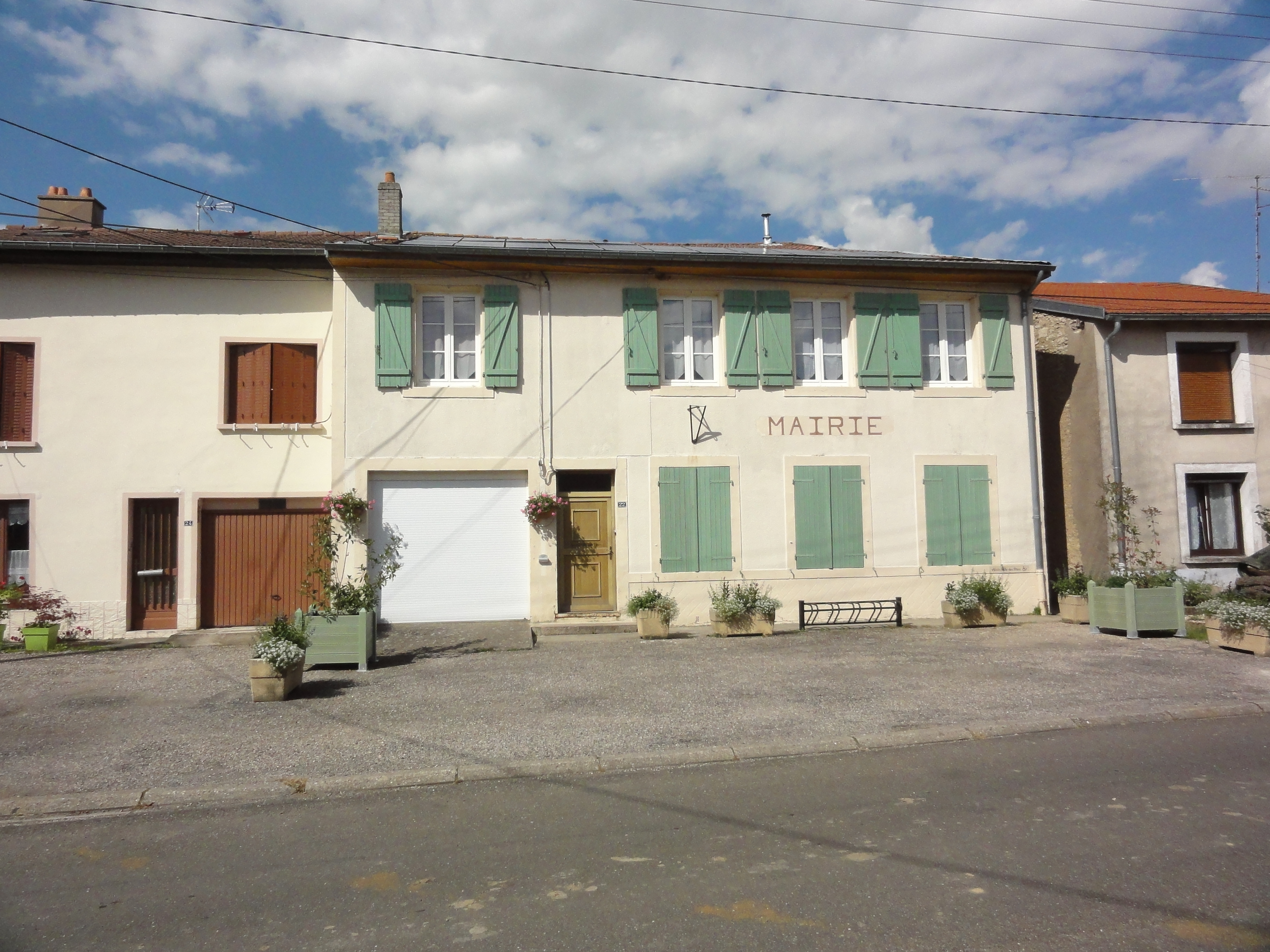
- The town hall in Fréménil

- Coat of arms
- Location of Fréménil
- Location within France Location within Grand Est
- Coordinates: 48°33′57″N 6°42′48″E
- Country: France
- Region: Grand Est
- Department: Meurthe-et-Moselle
- Arrondissement: Lunéville
- Canton: Baccarat

Government
  - Mayor (2020–2026): Nicole Milbach
- Area^{1}: 3.04 km^{2} (1.17 sq mi)
- Elevation: 244 m (801 ft)
- Highest elevation: 264 m (866 ft)
- Lowest elevation: 240 m (790 ft)
- Population (2023): 222
  - Density: 73.0/km^{2} (189/sq mi)
- Time zone: UTC+01:00 (CET)
  - Summer (DST): UTC+02:00 (CEST)
- INSEE/Postal code: 54210 /54450
- ^{1} French Land Register data, which excludes lakes, ponds, glaciers > 1 km^{2} (0.386 sq mi or 247 acres) and river estuaries.

Fréménil (French pronunciation: [fʁemenil]) is a commune in the Meurthe-et-Moselle department in north-eastern France.

== See also ==
- Communes of the Meurthe-et-Moselle department
