= Verdenal =

- Commune
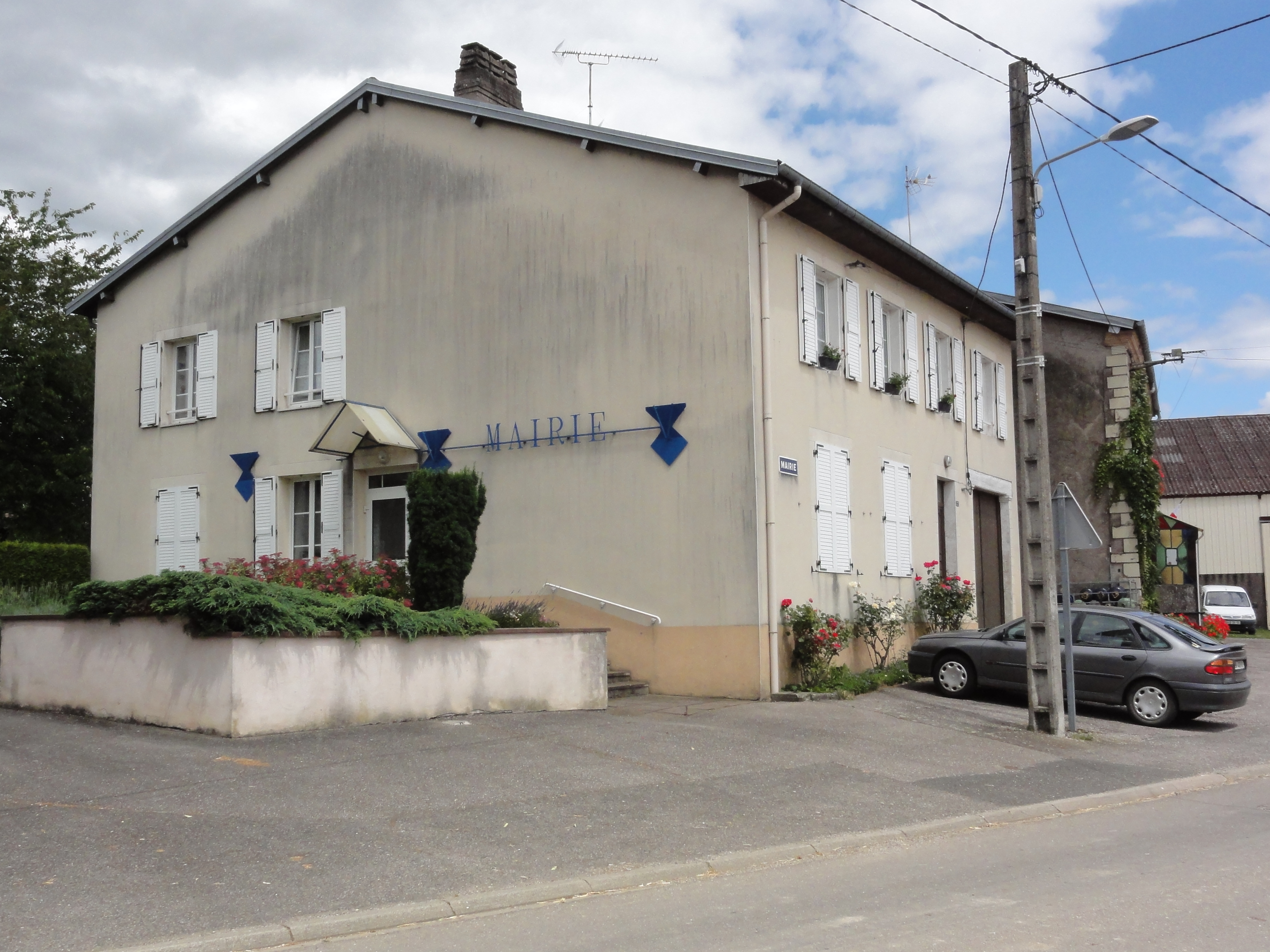
- The town hall in Verdenal

- Coat of arms
- Location of Verdenal
- Location within France Location within Grand Est
- Coordinates: 48°35′04″N 6°48′43″E
- Country: France
- Region: Grand Est
- Department: Meurthe-et-Moselle
- Arrondissement: Lunéville
- Canton: Baccarat

Government
  - Mayor (2020–2026): Laurent Nitting
- Area^{1}: 6.54 km^{2} (2.53 sq mi)
- Elevation: 285 m (935 ft)
- Highest elevation: 330 m (1,080 ft)
- Lowest elevation: 251 m (823 ft)
- Population (2023): 120
  - Density: 18/km^{2} (48/sq mi)
- Time zone: UTC+01:00 (CET)
  - Summer (DST): UTC+02:00 (CEST)
- INSEE/Postal code: 54562 /54450
- ^{1} French Land Register data, which excludes lakes, ponds, glaciers > 1 km^{2} (0.386 sq mi or 247 acres) and river estuaries.

Verdenal (French pronunciation: [vɛʁdənal]) is a commune in the Meurthe-et-Moselle department in north-eastern France.

== Population ==
Historical population
Year	Pop.	±% p.a.
1968	132	—
1975	125	−0.78%
1982	131	+0.67%
1990	109	−2.27%
1999	120	+1.07%
2007	148	+2.66%
2012	153	+0.67%
2017	156	+0.39%
2023	120	−4.28%
Source: INSEE

== See also ==
- Communes of the Meurthe-et-Moselle department
