= Reherrey =

- Commune
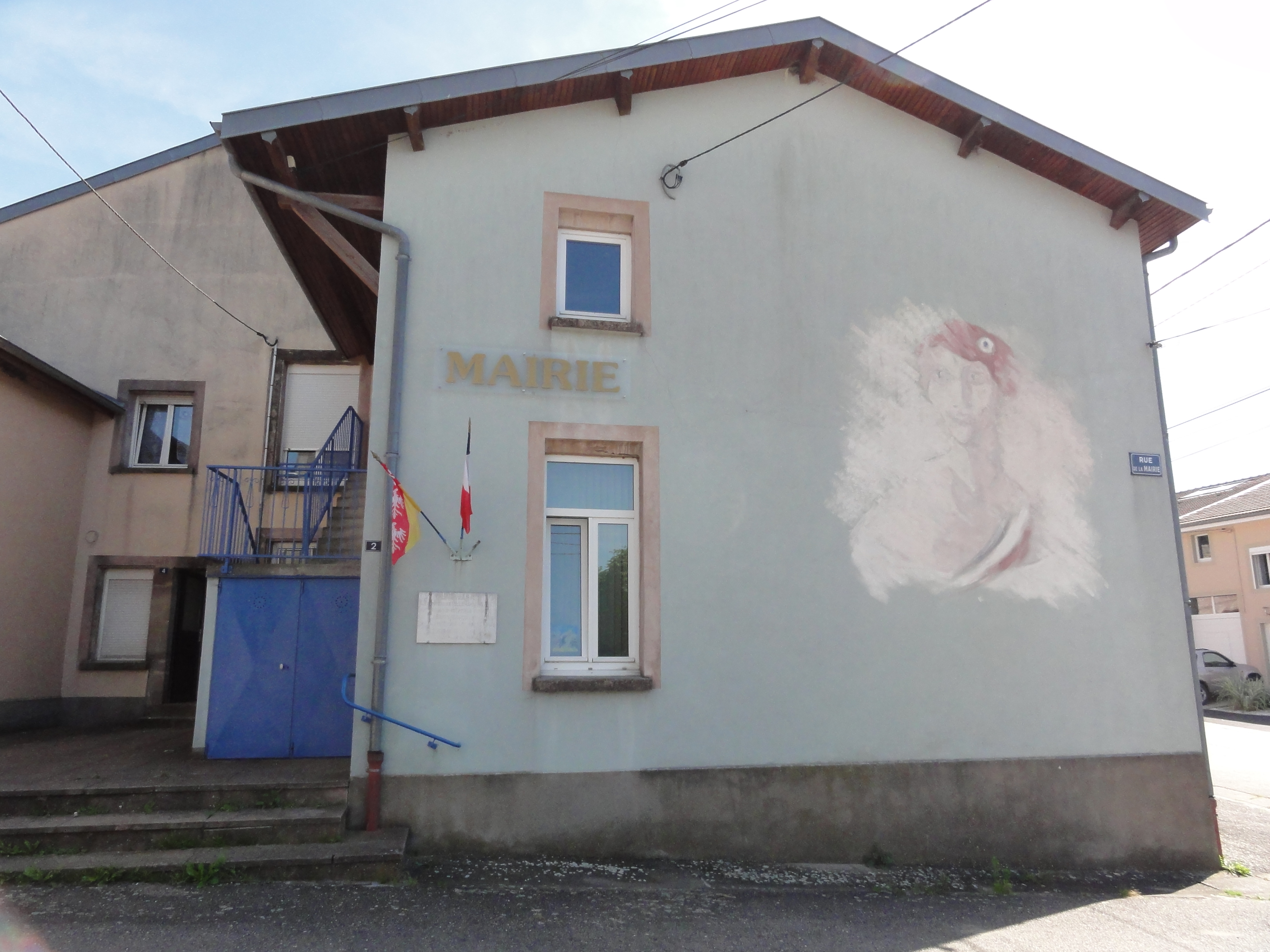
- The town hall in Reherrey

- Coat of arms
- Location of Reherrey
- Location within France Location within Grand Est
- Coordinates: 48°30′36″N 6°46′04″E
- Country: France
- Region: Grand Est
- Department: Meurthe-et-Moselle
- Arrondissement: Lunéville
- Canton: Baccarat
- Intercommunality: Territoire de Lunéville à Baccarat

Government
  - Mayor (2020–2026): Bertrand Schultheiss
- Area^{1}: 5.87 km^{2} (2.27 sq mi)
- Elevation: 269 m (883 ft)
- Highest elevation: 316 m (1,037 ft)
- Lowest elevation: 255 m (837 ft)
- Population (2023): 146
  - Density: 24.9/km^{2} (64.4/sq mi)
- Time zone: UTC+01:00 (CET)
  - Summer (DST): UTC+02:00 (CEST)
- INSEE/Postal code: 54450 /54120
- ^{1} French Land Register data, which excludes lakes, ponds, glaciers > 1 km^{2} (0.386 sq mi or 247 acres) and river estuaries.

Reherrey (French pronunciation: [ʁə.eʁɛ]) is a commune in the Meurthe-et-Moselle department in north-eastern France.

== See also ==
- Communes of the Meurthe-et-Moselle department
