= Frémonville =

- Commune
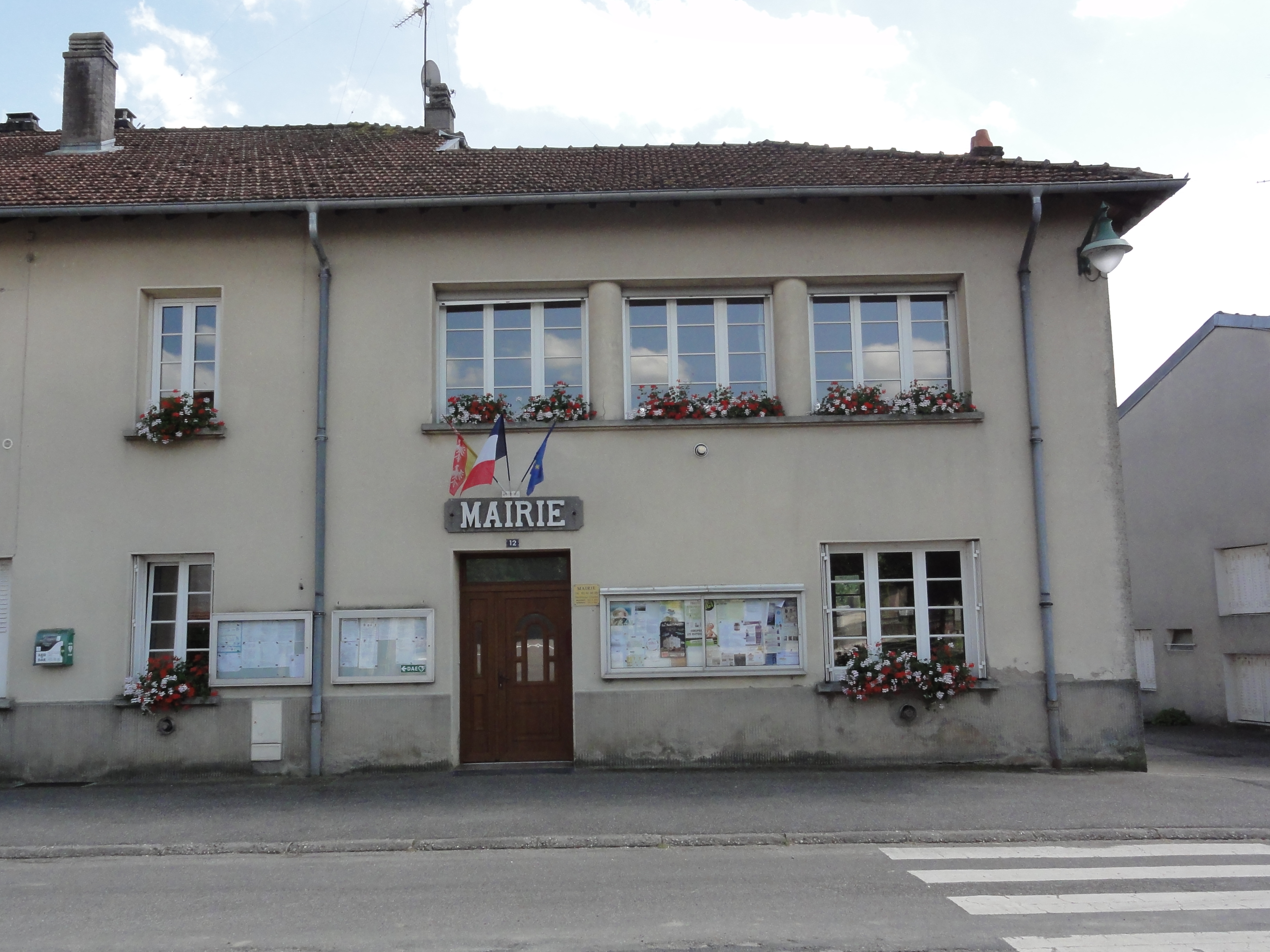
- The town hall in Frémonville

- Coat of arms
- Location of Frémonville
- Location within France Location within Grand Est
- Coordinates: 48°35′46″N 6°53′15″E
- Country: France
- Region: Grand Est
- Department: Meurthe-et-Moselle
- Arrondissement: Lunéville
- Canton: Baccarat

Government
  - Mayor (2020–2026): Jean-Louis Kippeurt
- Area^{1}: 13.65 km^{2} (5.27 sq mi)
- Elevation: 277 m (909 ft)
- Highest elevation: 364 m (1,194 ft)
- Lowest elevation: 264 m (866 ft)
- Population (2023): 211
  - Density: 15.5/km^{2} (40.0/sq mi)
- Time zone: UTC+01:00 (CET)
  - Summer (DST): UTC+02:00 (CEST)
- INSEE/Postal code: 54211 /54450
- ^{1} French Land Register data, which excludes lakes, ponds, glaciers > 1 km^{2} (0.386 sq mi or 247 acres) and river estuaries.

Frémonville (French pronunciation: [fʁemɔ̃vil]) is a commune in the Meurthe-et-Moselle department in north-eastern France.

== See also ==
- Communes of the Meurthe-et-Moselle department
