= Vacqueville =

- Commune
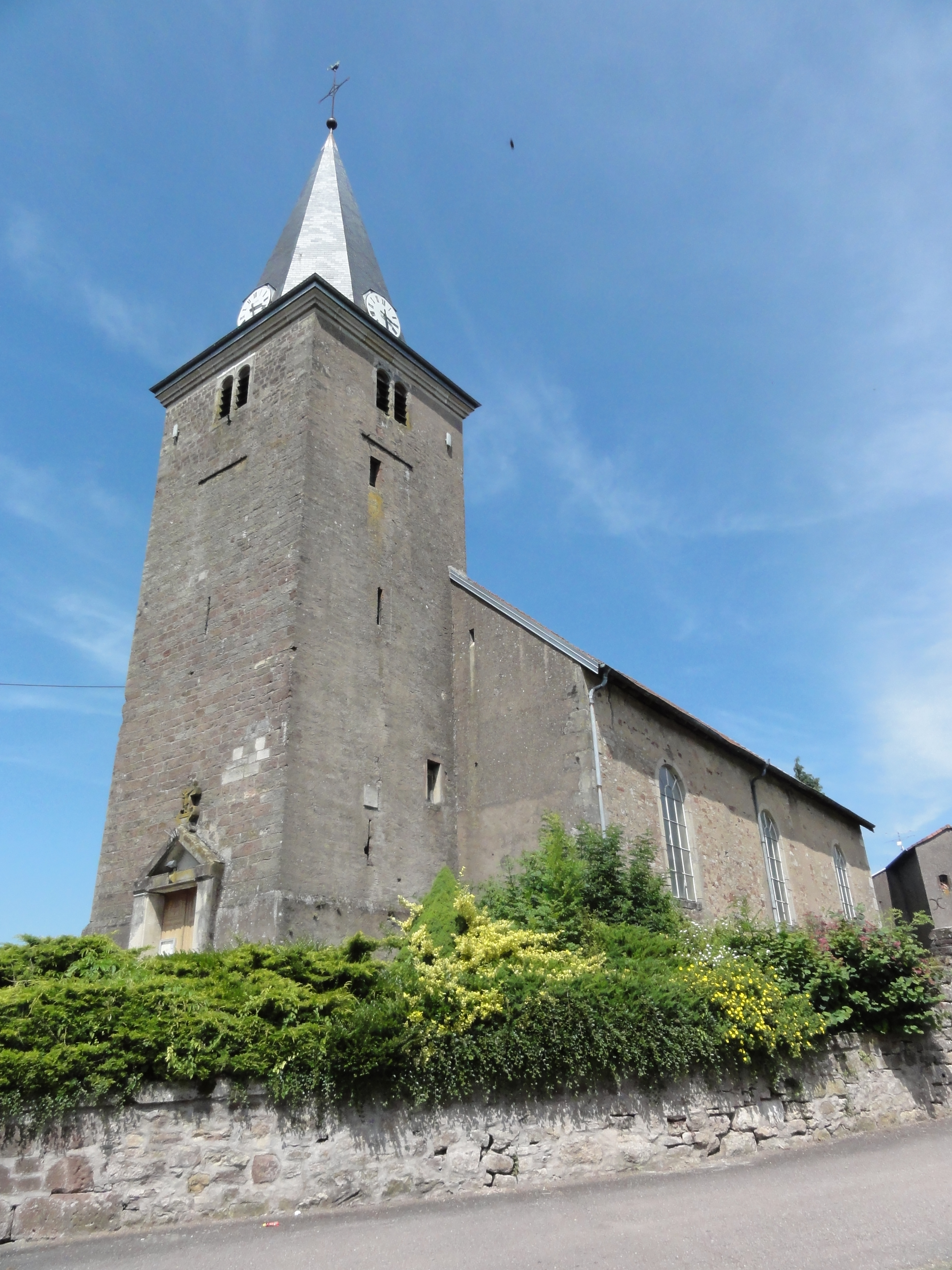
- The church in Vacqueville

- Coat of arms
- Location of Vacqueville
- Location within France Location within Grand Est
- Coordinates: 48°28′56″N 6°48′52″E
- Country: France
- Region: Grand Est
- Department: Meurthe-et-Moselle
- Arrondissement: Lunéville
- Canton: Baccarat
- Intercommunality: Territoire de Lunéville à Baccarat

Government
  - Mayor (2020–2026): Jean-Marie Lardin
- Area^{1}: 9.96 km^{2} (3.85 sq mi)
- Elevation: 270 m (890 ft)
- Highest elevation: 386 m (1,266 ft)
- Lowest elevation: 264 m (866 ft)
- Population (2023): 230
  - Density: 23/km^{2} (60/sq mi)
- Time zone: UTC+01:00 (CET)
  - Summer (DST): UTC+02:00 (CEST)
- INSEE/Postal code: 54539 /54540
- ^{1} French Land Register data, which excludes lakes, ponds, glaciers > 1 km^{2} (0.386 sq mi or 247 acres) and river estuaries.

Vacqueville (French pronunciation: [vakvil]) is a commune in the Meurthe-et-Moselle department, northeastern France.

== Population ==
Historical population
Year	Pop.	±% p.a.
1968	271	—
1975	254	−0.92%
1982	224	−1.78%
1990	211	−0.74%
1999	240	+1.44%
2007	241	+0.05%
2012	259	+1.45%
2017	238	−1.68%
2023	230	−0.57%
Source: INSEE

== See also ==
- Communes of the Meurthe-et-Moselle department
