= Buriville =

- Commune
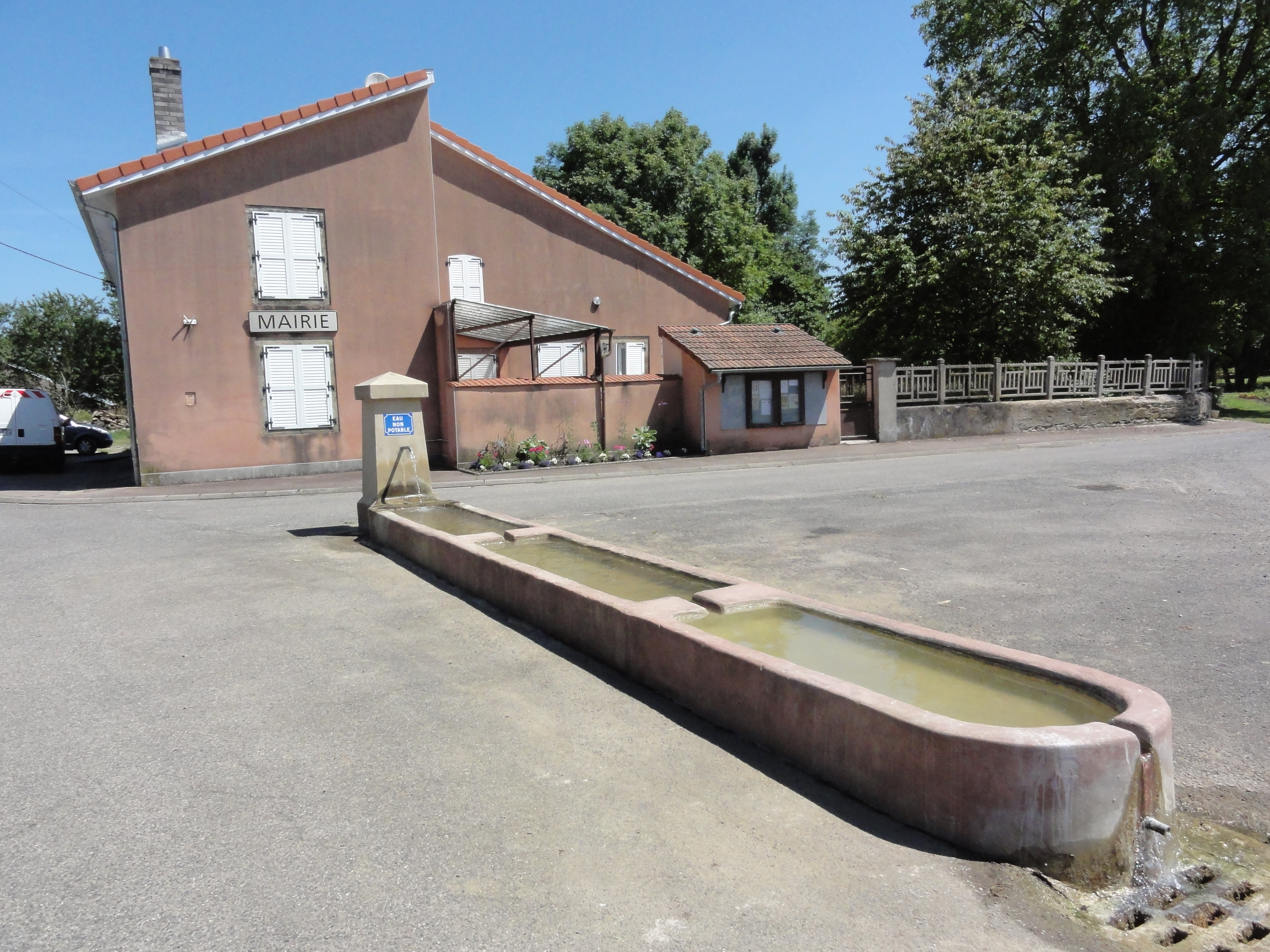
- The town hall in Buriville

- Coat of arms
- Location of Buriville
- Location within France Location within Grand Est
- Coordinates: 48°32′24″N 6°42′31″E
- Country: France
- Region: Grand Est
- Department: Meurthe-et-Moselle
- Arrondissement: Lunéville
- Canton: Baccarat

Government
  - Mayor (2020–2026): Sabine Martin
- Area^{1}: 11.44 km^{2} (4.42 sq mi)
- Elevation: 262 m (860 ft)
- Highest elevation: 326 m (1,070 ft)
- Lowest elevation: 249 m (817 ft)
- Population (2023): 69
  - Density: 6.0/km^{2} (16/sq mi)
- Time zone: UTC+01:00 (CET)
  - Summer (DST): UTC+02:00 (CEST)
- INSEE/Postal code: 54107 /54450
- ^{1} French Land Register data, which excludes lakes, ponds, glaciers > 1 km^{2} (0.386 sq mi or 247 acres) and river estuaries.

Buriville (French pronunciation: [byʁivil]) is a commune in the Meurthe-et-Moselle department in northeastern France.

== Population ==
Historical population
| Year | Pop. | ±% p.a. |
|---|---|---|
| 1968 | 54 | — |
| 1975 | 45 | −2.57% |
| 1982 | 44 | −0.32% |
| 1990 | 47 | +0.83% |
| 1999 | 40 | −1.78% |
| 2007 | 65 | +6.26% |
| 2012 | 71 | +1.78% |
| 2017 | 74 | +0.83% |
| 2023 | 69 | −1.16% |
Source: INSEE

== See also ==
- Communes of the Meurthe-et-Moselle department
