= Juvrecourt =

- Commune
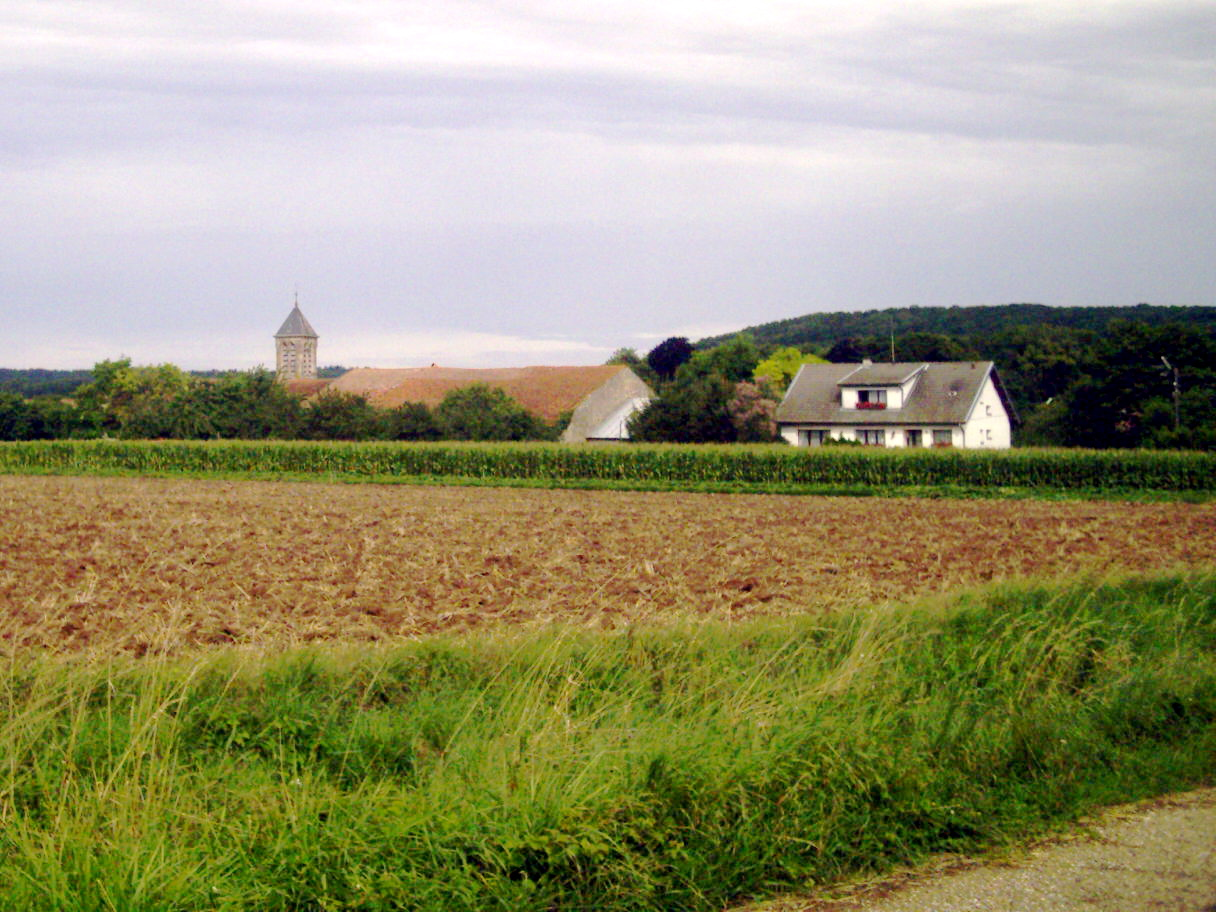
- A general view of Juvrecourt

- Coat of arms
- Location of Juvrecourt
- Location within France Location within Grand Est
- Coordinates: 48°44′37″N 6°34′00″E
- Country: France
- Region: Grand Est
- Department: Meurthe-et-Moselle
- Arrondissement: Lunéville
- Canton: Baccarat
- Intercommunality: CC Pays du Sânon

Government
  - Mayor (2020–2026): Pascal Lamy
- Area^{1}: 6.11 km^{2} (2.36 sq mi)
- Elevation: 300 m (980 ft)
- Highest elevation: 315 m (1,033 ft)
- Lowest elevation: 221 m (725 ft)
- Population (2023): 35
  - Density: 5.7/km^{2} (15/sq mi)
- Time zone: UTC+01:00 (CET)
  - Summer (DST): UTC+02:00 (CEST)
- INSEE/Postal code: 54285 /54370
- ^{1} French Land Register data, which excludes lakes, ponds, glaciers > 1 km^{2} (0.386 sq mi or 247 acres) and river estuaries.

Juvrecourt (French pronunciation: [ʒyvʁəkuʁ]) is a commune in the Meurthe-et-Moselle department in north–eastern France.

== See also ==
- Communes of the Meurthe-et-Moselle department
