= Nonhigny =

- Commune
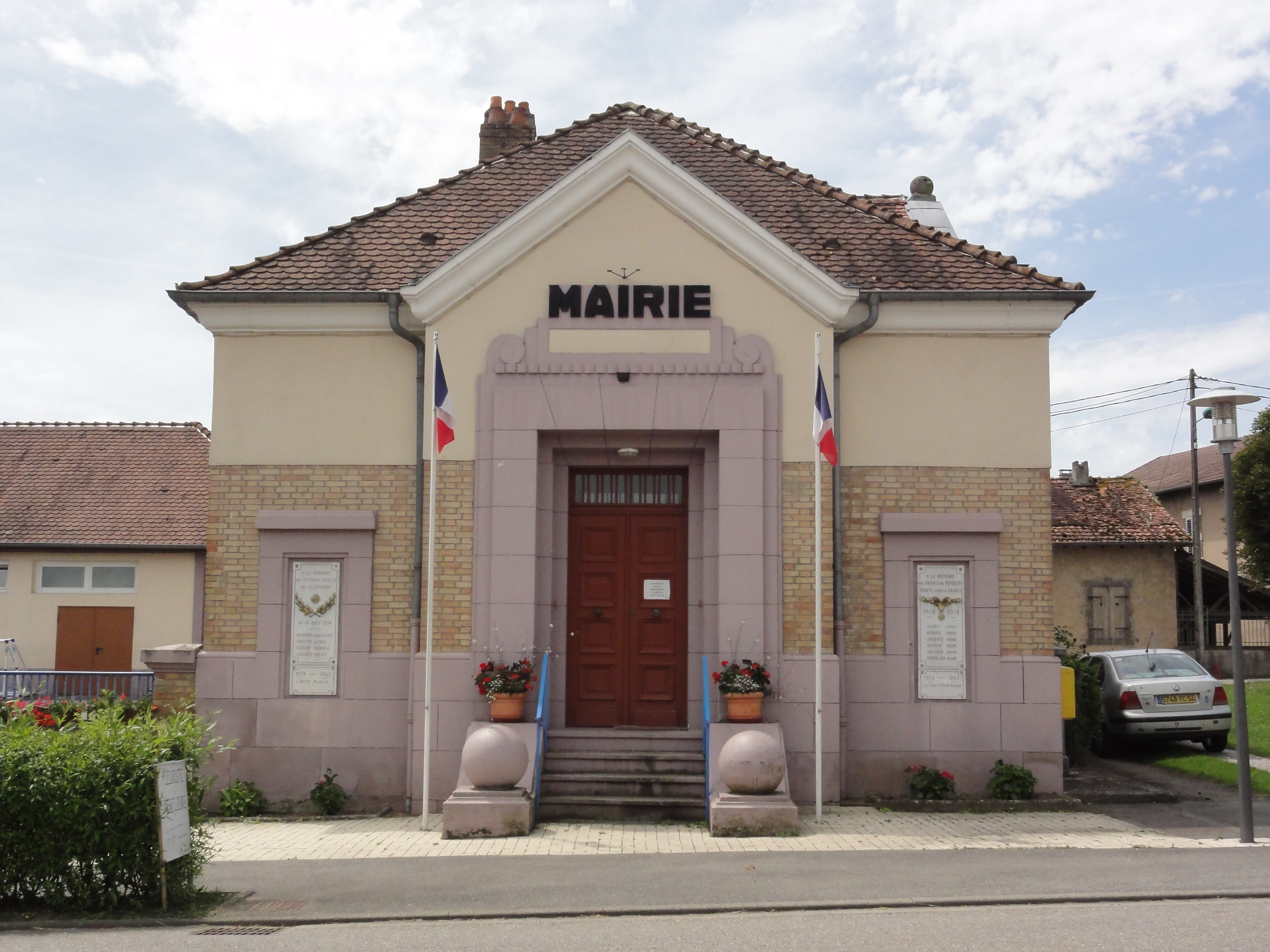
- The town hall in Nonhigny

- Coat of arms
- Location of Nonhigny
- Location within France Location within Grand Est
- Coordinates: 48°33′05″N 6°52′52″E
- Country: France
- Region: Grand Est
- Department: Meurthe-et-Moselle
- Arrondissement: Lunéville
- Canton: Baccarat

Government
  - Mayor (2020–2026): Thierry L'Hote
- Area^{1}: 5.75 km^{2} (2.22 sq mi)
- Elevation: 300 m (980 ft)
- Highest elevation: 329 m (1,079 ft)
- Lowest elevation: 266 m (873 ft)
- Population (2023): 140
  - Density: 24/km^{2} (63/sq mi)
- Time zone: UTC+01:00 (CET)
  - Summer (DST): UTC+02:00 (CEST)
- INSEE/Postal code: 54401 /54450
- ^{1} French Land Register data, which excludes lakes, ponds, glaciers > 1 km^{2} (0.386 sq mi or 247 acres) and river estuaries.

Nonhigny is a commune in the Meurthe-et-Moselle department in north-eastern France.

== See also ==
- Communes of the Meurthe-et-Moselle department
