= Vaxainville =

- Commune
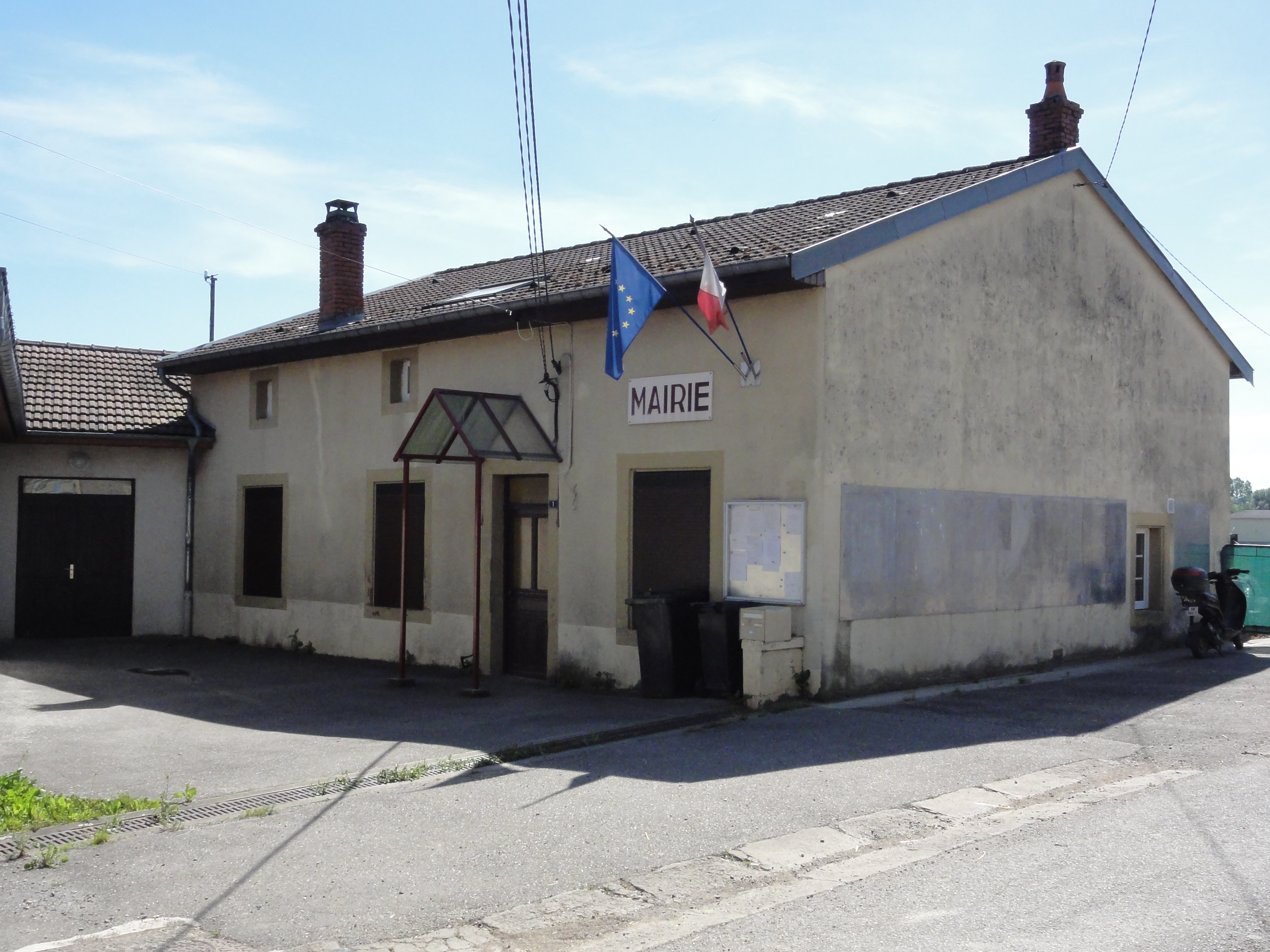
- The town hall in Vaxainville

- Coat of arms
- Location of Vaxainville
- Location within France Location within Grand Est
- Coordinates: 48°31′00″N 6°45′17″E
- Country: France
- Region: Grand Est
- Department: Meurthe-et-Moselle
- Arrondissement: Lunéville
- Canton: Baccarat
- Intercommunality: Territoire de Lunéville à Baccarat

Government
  - Mayor (2020–2026): Pascal Marchal
- Area^{1}: 3.59 km^{2} (1.39 sq mi)
- Elevation: 260 m (850 ft)
- Highest elevation: 320 m (1,050 ft)
- Lowest elevation: 252 m (827 ft)
- Population (2023): 83
  - Density: 23/km^{2} (60/sq mi)
- Time zone: UTC+01:00 (CET)
  - Summer (DST): UTC+02:00 (CEST)
- INSEE/Postal code: 54555 /54120
- ^{1} French Land Register data, which excludes lakes, ponds, glaciers > 1 km^{2} (0.386 sq mi or 247 acres) and river estuaries.

Vaxainville is a commune in the Meurthe-et-Moselle department in north-eastern France.

== See also ==
- Communes of the Meurthe-et-Moselle department
