= Amenoncourt =

- Commune
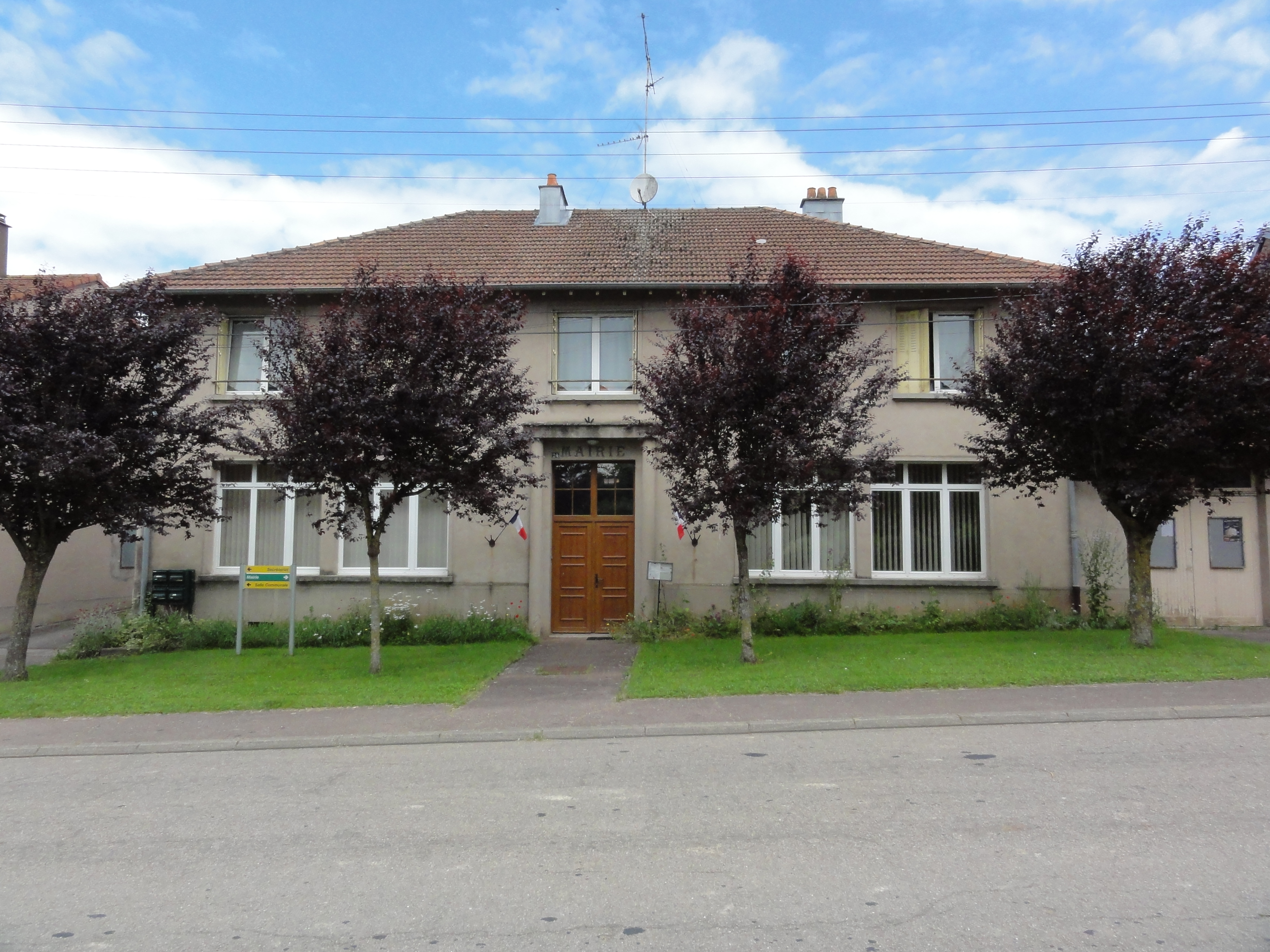
- The town hall in Amenoncourt

- Coat of arms
- Location of Amenoncourt
- Location within France Location within Grand Est
- Coordinates: 48°37′43″N 6°47′23″E
- Country: France
- Region: Grand Est
- Department: Meurthe-et-Moselle
- Arrondissement: Lunéville
- Canton: Baccarat
- Intercommunality: Vezouze en Piémont

Government
  - Mayor (2020–2026): Lucie Kippeurt
- Area^{1}: 7.23 km^{2} (2.79 sq mi)
- Elevation: 316 m (1,037 ft)
- Highest elevation: 350 m (1,150 ft)
- Lowest elevation: 259 m (850 ft)
- Population (2023): 87
  - Density: 12/km^{2} (31/sq mi)
- Time zone: UTC+01:00 (CET)
  - Summer (DST): UTC+02:00 (CEST)
- INSEE/Postal code: 54013 /54450
- ^{1} French Land Register data, which excludes lakes, ponds, glaciers > 1 km^{2} (0.386 sq mi or 247 acres) and river estuaries.

Amenoncourt (French pronunciation: [amnɔ̃kuʁ]) is a commune in the Meurthe-et-Moselle department in northeastern France.

== Population ==
Historical population
Year	Pop.	±% p.a.
1968	123	—
1975	97	−3.34%
1982	84	−2.03%
1990	91	+1.01%
1999	96	+0.60%
2007	102	+0.76%
2012	91	−2.26%
2017	77	−3.29%
2023	87	+2.06%
Source: INSEE

== See also ==
- Communes of the Meurthe-et-Moselle department
