= Bertrambois =

- Commune
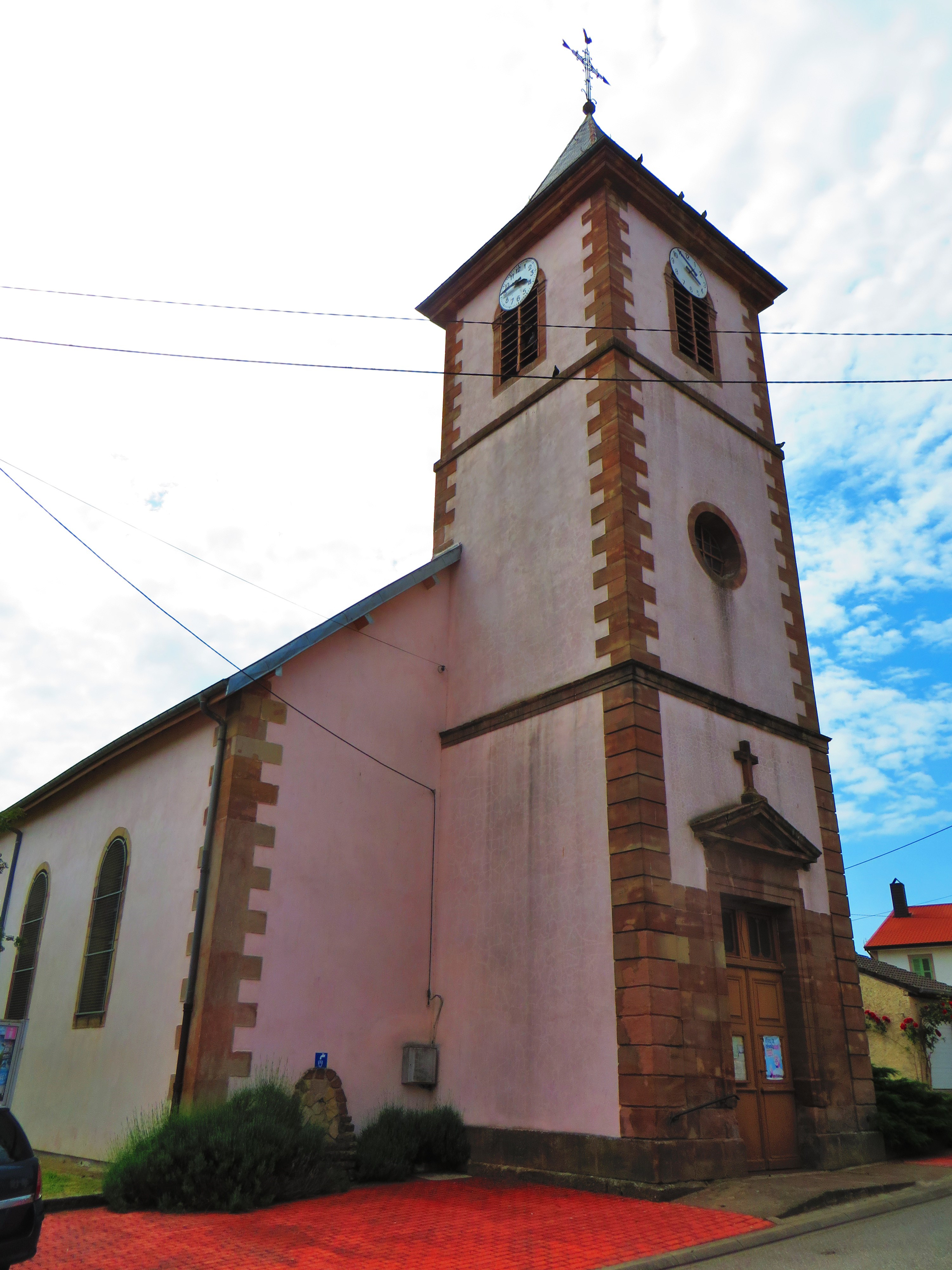
- The church in Bertrambois

- Coat of arms
- Location of Bertrambois
- Location within France Location within Grand Est
- Coordinates: 48°36′21″N 6°59′13″E
- Country: France
- Region: Grand Est
- Department: Meurthe-et-Moselle
- Arrondissement: Lunéville
- Canton: Baccarat
- Intercommunality: Vezouze en Piémont

Government
  - Mayor (2020–2026): Agnès Renck
- Area^{1}: 18.46 km^{2} (7.13 sq mi)
- Elevation: 340 m (1,120 ft)
- Highest elevation: 675 m (2,215 ft)
- Lowest elevation: 294 m (965 ft)
- Population (2023): 320
  - Density: 17/km^{2} (45/sq mi)
- Time zone: UTC+01:00 (CET)
  - Summer (DST): UTC+02:00 (CEST)
- INSEE/Postal code: 54064 /54480
- ^{1} French Land Register data, which excludes lakes, ponds, glaciers > 1 km^{2} (0.386 sq mi or 247 acres) and river estuaries.

Bertrambois (French pronunciation: [bɛʁtʁɑ̃bwa]) is a commune in the Meurthe-et-Moselle department in northeastern France.

== Population ==
Historical population
Year	Pop.	±% p.a.
1968	483	—
1975	409	−2.35%
1982	405	−0.14%
1990	342	−2.09%
1999	403	+1.84%
2007	366	−1.20%
2012	355	−0.61%
2017	308	−2.80%
2023	320	+0.64%
Source: INSEE

== See also ==
- Communes of the Meurthe-et-Moselle department
