= Veney =

- Commune
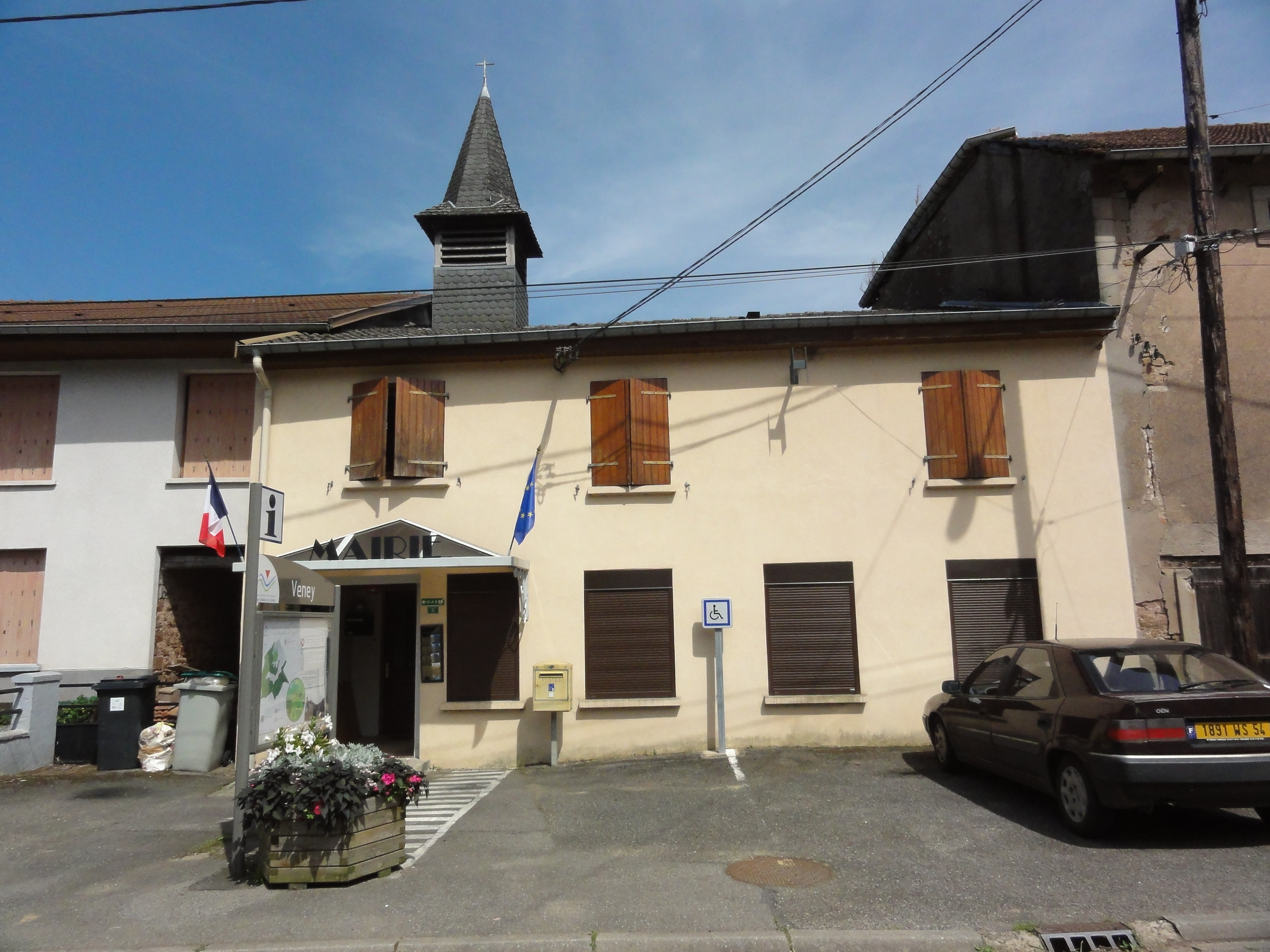
- The town hall in Veney

- Coat of arms
- Location of Veney
- Location within France Location within Grand Est
- Coordinates: 48°28′02″N 6°48′51″E
- Country: France
- Region: Grand Est
- Department: Meurthe-et-Moselle
- Arrondissement: Lunéville
- Canton: Baccarat
- Intercommunality: Territoire de Lunéville à Baccarat

Government
  - Mayor (2021–2026): Audrey Finance
- Area^{1}: 3.45 km^{2} (1.33 sq mi)
- Elevation: 302 m (991 ft)
- Highest elevation: 386 m (1,266 ft)
- Lowest elevation: 274 m (899 ft)
- Population (2023): 49
  - Density: 14/km^{2} (37/sq mi)
- Time zone: UTC+01:00 (CET)
  - Summer (DST): UTC+02:00 (CEST)
- INSEE/Postal code: 54560 /54540
- ^{1} French Land Register data, which excludes lakes, ponds, glaciers > 1 km^{2} (0.386 sq mi or 247 acres) and river estuaries.

Veney (French pronunciation: [vənɛ]) is a commune in the Meurthe-et-Moselle department in north-eastern France.

== See also ==
- Communes of the Meurthe-et-Moselle department
