= Pettonville =

- Commune
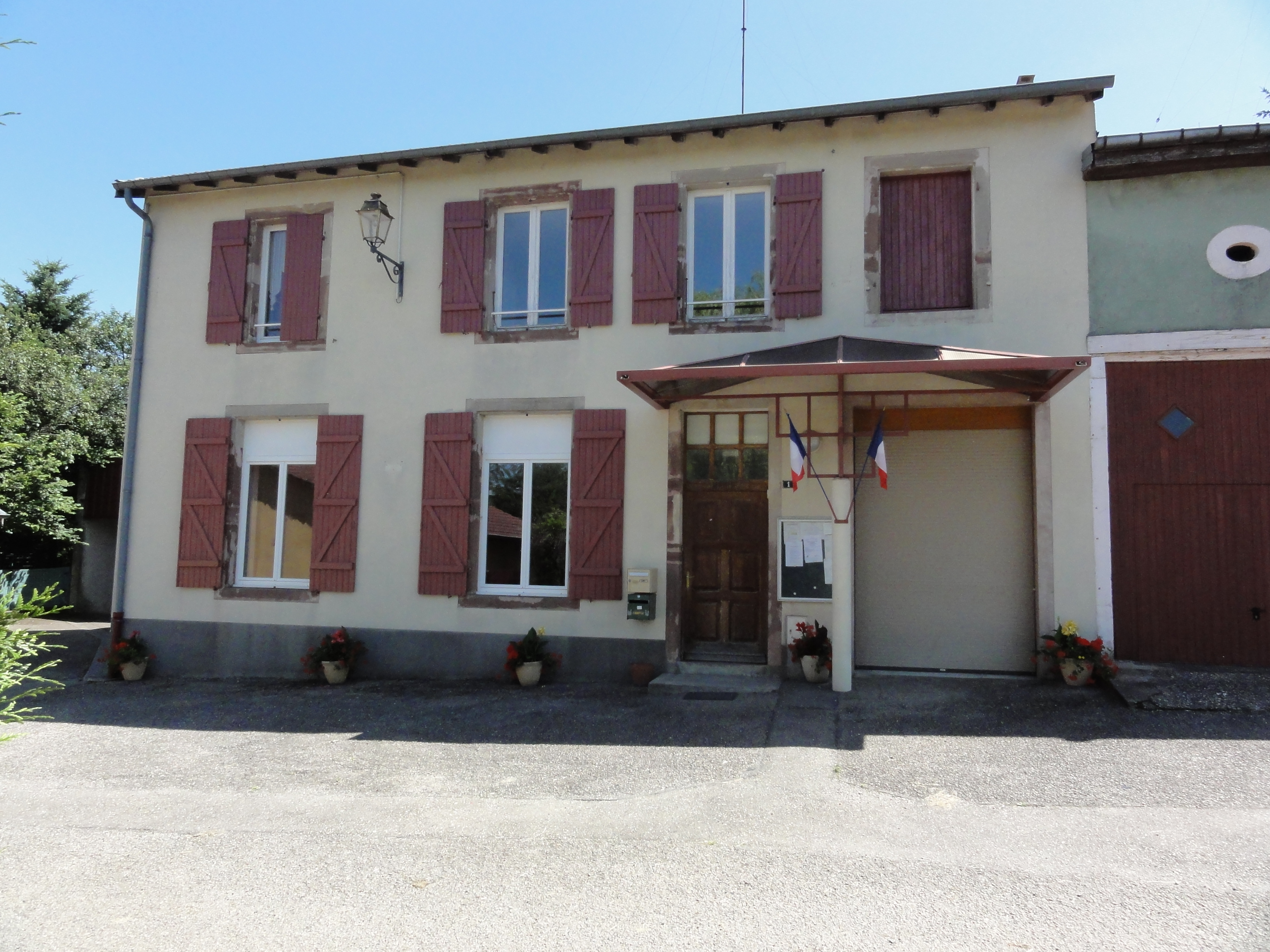
- The town hall in Pettonville

- Coat of arms
- Location of Pettonville
- Location within France Location within Grand Est
- Coordinates: 48°31′47″N 6°44′33″E
- Country: France
- Region: Grand Est
- Department: Meurthe-et-Moselle
- Arrondissement: Lunéville
- Canton: Baccarat
- Intercommunality: Territoire de Lunéville à Baccarat

Government
  - Mayor (2020–2026): Alain Fortier
- Area^{1}: 2.92 km^{2} (1.13 sq mi)
- Elevation: 254 m (833 ft)
- Highest elevation: 300 m (980 ft)
- Lowest elevation: 252 m (827 ft)
- Population (2023): 65
  - Density: 22/km^{2} (58/sq mi)
- Time zone: UTC+01:00 (CET)
  - Summer (DST): UTC+02:00 (CEST)
- INSEE/Postal code: 54422 /54120
- ^{1} French Land Register data, which excludes lakes, ponds, glaciers > 1 km^{2} (0.386 sq mi or 247 acres) and river estuaries.

Pettonville (French pronunciation: [petɔ̃vil]) is a commune in the Meurthe-et-Moselle department in north-eastern France.

== See also ==
- Communes of the Meurthe-et-Moselle department
