= Ancerviller =

- Commune
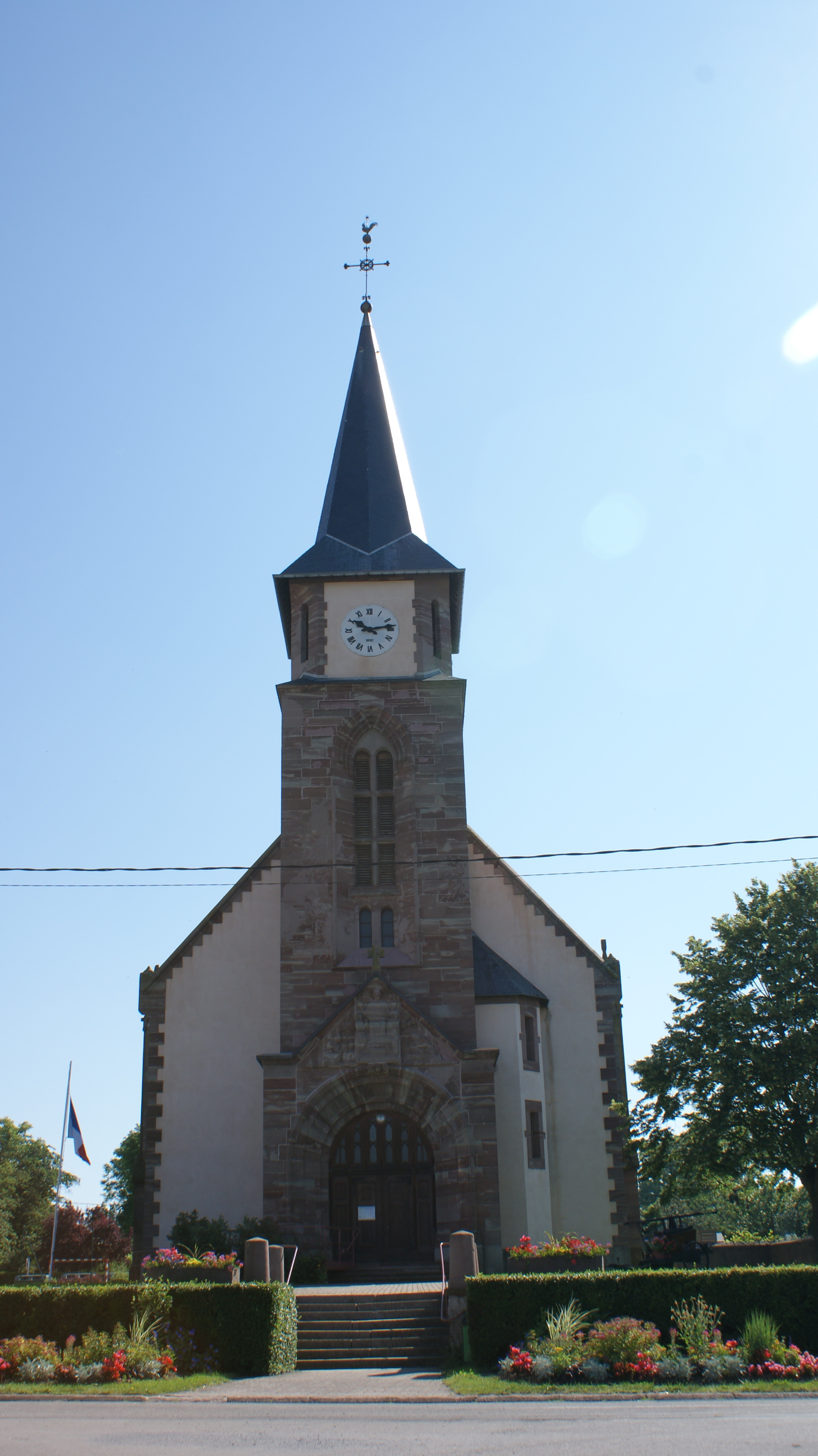
- The church in Ancerviller

- Coat of arms
- Location of Ancerviller
- Location within France Location within Grand Est
- Coordinates: 48°31′59″N 6°50′09″E
- Country: France
- Region: Grand Est
- Department: Meurthe-et-Moselle
- Arrondissement: Lunéville
- Canton: Baccarat
- Intercommunality: Vezouze en Piémont

Government
  - Mayor (2020–2026): Philippe Colin
- Area^{1}: 12.34 km^{2} (4.76 sq mi)
- Elevation: 310 m (1,020 ft)
- Highest elevation: 335 m (1,099 ft)
- Lowest elevation: 277 m (909 ft)
- Population (2023): 245
  - Density: 19.9/km^{2} (51.4/sq mi)
- Time zone: UTC+01:00 (CET)
  - Summer (DST): UTC+02:00 (CEST)
- INSEE/Postal code: 54014 /54450
- ^{1} French Land Register data, which excludes lakes, ponds, glaciers > 1 km^{2} (0.386 sq mi or 247 acres) and river estuaries.

Ancerviller (French pronunciation: [ɑ̃sɛʁvile]) is a commune in the Meurthe-et-Moselle department in northeastern France.

== Population ==
Historical population
Year	Pop.	±% p.a.
1968	309	—
1975	288	−1.00%
1982	254	−1.78%
1990	220	−1.78%
1999	241	+1.02%
2007	248	+0.36%
2012	252	+0.32%
2017	282	+2.28%
2023	245	−2.32%
Source: INSEE

== See also ==
- Communes of the Meurthe-et-Moselle department
