= Tanconville =

- Commune
- Coat of arms
- Location of Tanconville
- Location within France Location within Grand Est
- Coordinates: 48°36′21″N 6°56′04″E
- Country: France
- Region: Grand Est
- Department: Meurthe-et-Moselle
- Arrondissement: Lunéville
- Canton: Baccarat
- Intercommunality: CC de Vezouze en Piémont

Government
  - Mayor (2020–2026): Joël Mathieu
- Area^{1}: 4.09 km^{2} (1.58 sq mi)
- Elevation: 320 m (1,050 ft)
- Highest elevation: 361 m (1,184 ft)
- Lowest elevation: 288 m (945 ft)
- Population (2023): 105
  - Density: 25.7/km^{2} (66.5/sq mi)
- Time zone: UTC+01:00 (CET)
  - Summer (DST): UTC+02:00 (CEST)
- INSEE/Postal code: 54512 /54480
- ^{1} French Land Register data, which excludes lakes, ponds, glaciers > 1 km^{2} (0.386 sq mi or 247 acres) and river estuaries.

Tanconville (French pronunciation: [tɑ̃kɔ̃vil]) is a commune in the Meurthe-et-Moselle department in north-eastern France.

== Population ==
Historical population
Year	Pop.	±% p.a.
1968	160	—
1975	147	−1.20%
1982	138	−0.90%
1990	115	−2.25%
1999	102	−1.32%
2007	90	−1.55%
2012	100	+2.13%
2017	114	+2.66%
2023	105	−1.36%
Source: INSEE

== See also ==
- Communes of the Meurthe-et-Moselle department
