= Hablainville =

- Commune
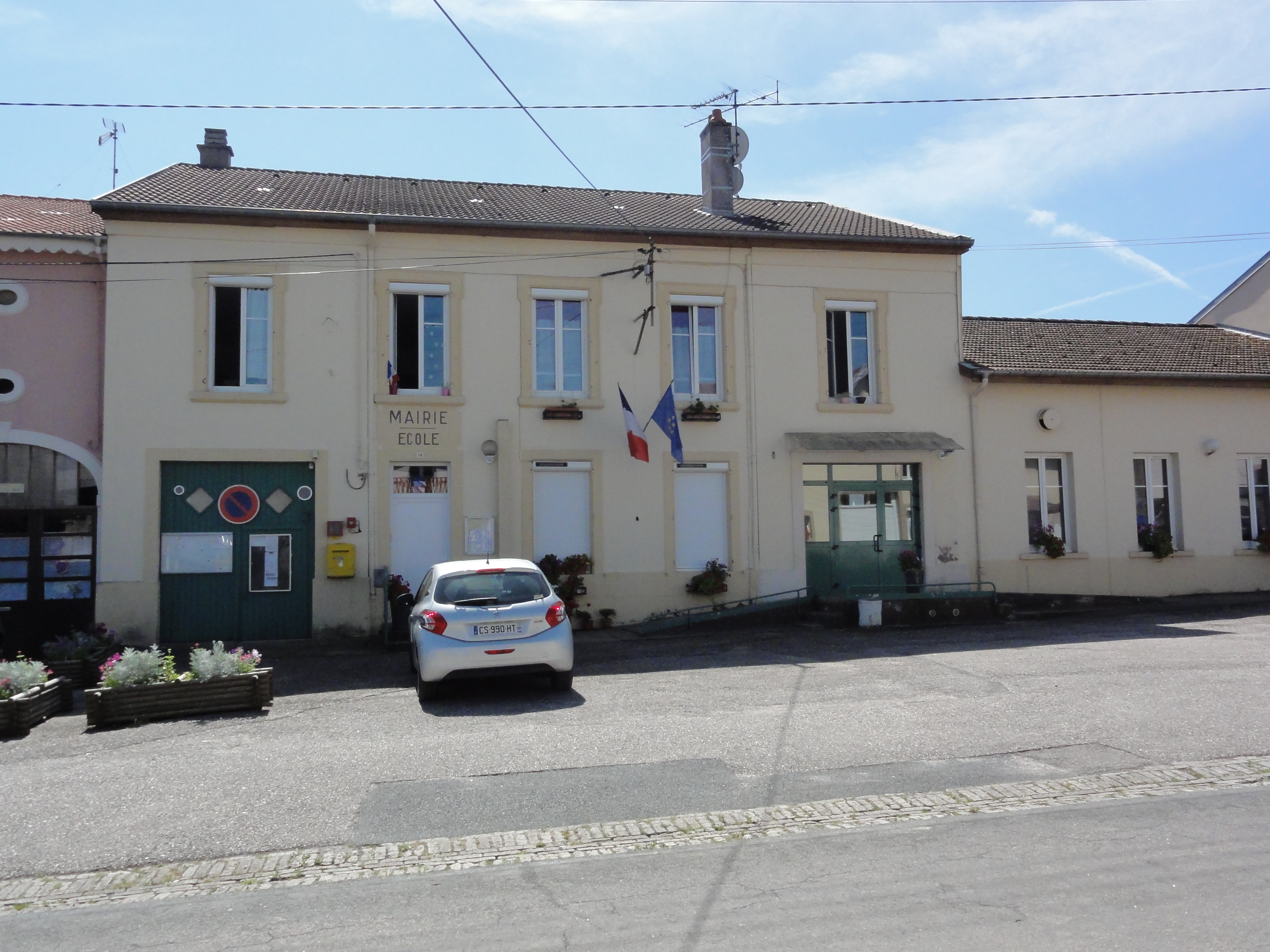
- The town hall in Hablainville

- Coat of arms
- Location of Hablainville
- Location within France Location within Grand Est
- Coordinates: 48°31′06″N 6°43′45″E
- Country: France
- Region: Grand Est
- Department: Meurthe-et-Moselle
- Arrondissement: Lunéville
- Canton: Baccarat
- Intercommunality: Territoire de Lunéville à Baccarat

Government
  - Mayor (2020–2026): Gérald François
- Area^{1}: 7.59 km^{2} (2.93 sq mi)
- Elevation: 315 m (1,033 ft)
- Highest elevation: 347 m (1,138 ft)
- Lowest elevation: 262 m (860 ft)
- Population (2023): 220
  - Density: 29/km^{2} (75/sq mi)
- Time zone: UTC+01:00 (CET)
  - Summer (DST): UTC+02:00 (CEST)
- INSEE/Postal code: 54243 /54120
- ^{1} French Land Register data, which excludes lakes, ponds, glaciers > 1 km^{2} (0.386 sq mi or 247 acres) and river estuaries.

Hablainville (French pronunciation: [ablɛ̃vil]) is a commune in the Meurthe-et-Moselle department in north-eastern France.

== Population ==
Historical population
Year	Pop.	±% p.a.
1968	209	—
1975	193	−1.13%
1982	162	−2.47%
1990	162	+0.00%
1999	191	+1.85%
2007	204	+0.83%
2012	215	+1.06%
2017	219	+0.37%
2023	220	+0.08%
Source: INSEE

== See also ==
- Communes of the Meurthe-et-Moselle department
