= Réclonville =

- Commune
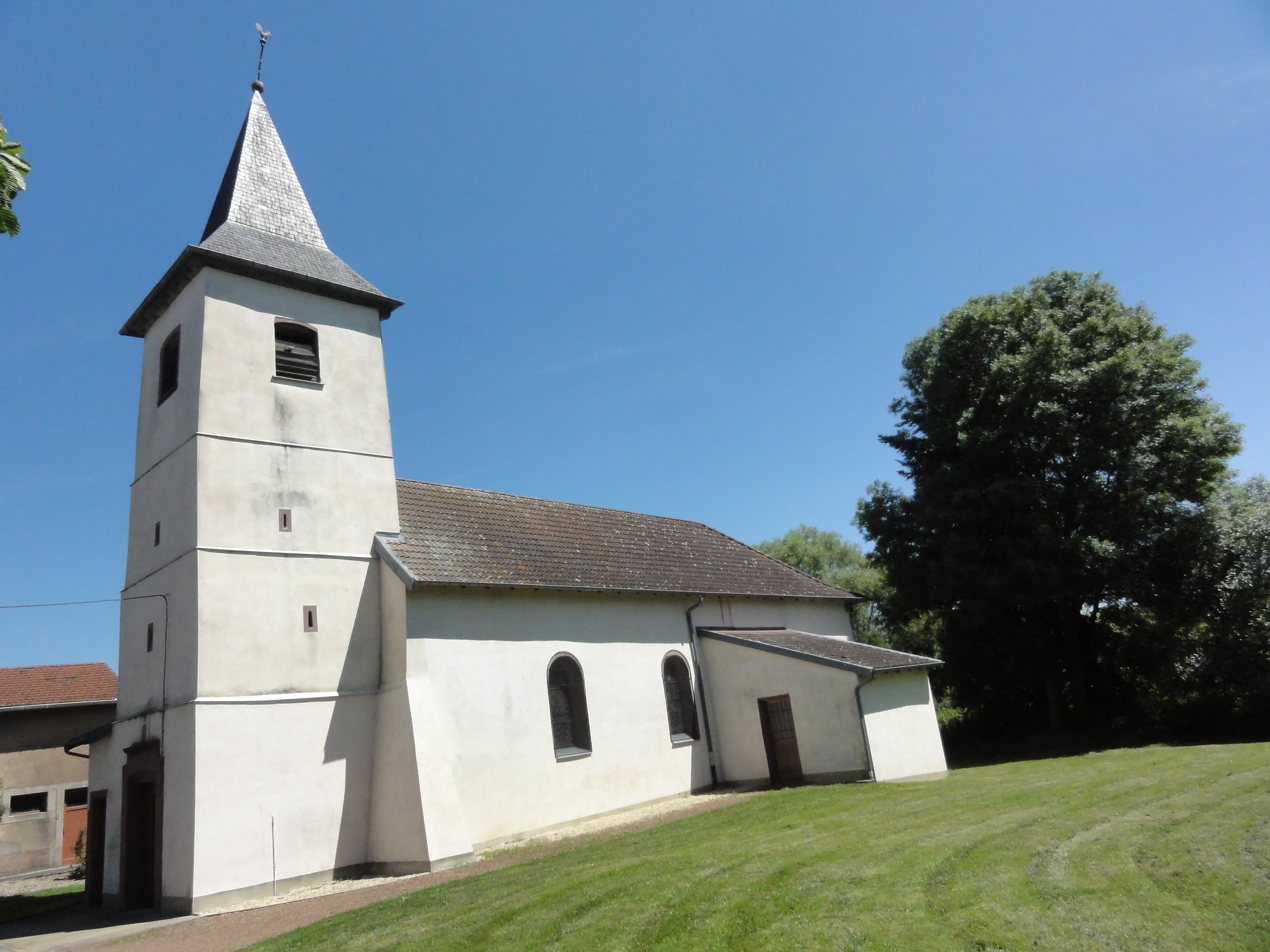
- The church in Réclonville

- Coat of arms
- Location of Réclonville
- Location within France Location within Grand Est
- Coordinates: 48°32′28″N 6°43′44″E
- Country: France
- Region: Grand Est
- Department: Meurthe-et-Moselle
- Arrondissement: Lunéville
- Canton: Baccarat

Government
  - Mayor (2020–2026): Jean-François Gustaw
- Area^{1}: 2.96 km^{2} (1.14 sq mi)
- Elevation: 250 m (820 ft)
- Highest elevation: 312 m (1,024 ft)
- Lowest elevation: 247 m (810 ft)
- Population (2023): 68
  - Density: 23/km^{2} (59/sq mi)
- Time zone: UTC+01:00 (CET)
  - Summer (DST): UTC+02:00 (CEST)
- INSEE/Postal code: 54447 /54450
- ^{1} French Land Register data, which excludes lakes, ponds, glaciers > 1 km^{2} (0.386 sq mi or 247 acres) and river estuaries.

Réclonville (French pronunciation: [ʁeklɔ̃vil]) is a commune in the Meurthe-et-Moselle department in north-eastern France.

== See also ==
- Communes of the Meurthe-et-Moselle department
