= Autrepierre =

- Commune
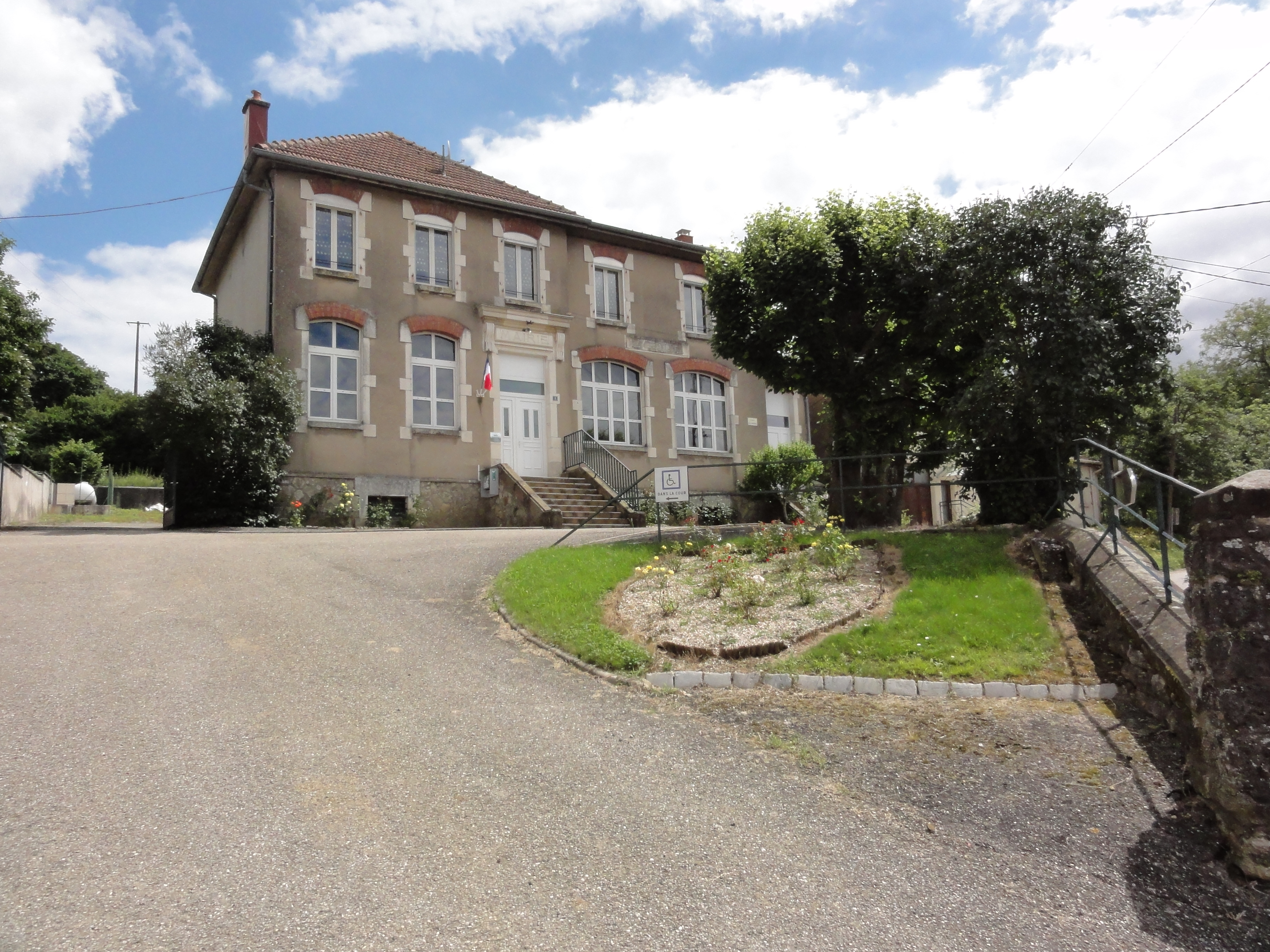
- The town hall and school in Autrepierre

- Coat of arms
- Location of Autrepierre
- Location within France Location within Grand Est
- Coordinates: 48°36′45″N 6°48′07″E
- Country: France
- Region: Grand Est
- Department: Meurthe-et-Moselle
- Arrondissement: Lunéville
- Canton: Baccarat
- Intercommunality: CC Vezouze Piémont

Government
  - Mayor (2020–2026): Yves Grelot
- Area^{1}: 7.75 km^{2} (2.99 sq mi)
- Elevation: 290 m (950 ft)
- Highest elevation: 346 m (1,135 ft)
- Lowest elevation: 254 m (833 ft)
- Population (2023): 74
  - Density: 9.5/km^{2} (25/sq mi)
- Time zone: UTC+01:00 (CET)
  - Summer (DST): UTC+02:00 (CEST)
- INSEE/Postal code: 54030 /54450
- ^{1} French Land Register data, which excludes lakes, ponds, glaciers > 1 km^{2} (0.386 sq mi or 247 acres) and river estuaries.

Autrepierre (French pronunciation: [otʁəpjɛʁ]) is a commune in the Meurthe-et-Moselle department in northeastern France.

== Population ==
Historical population
Year	Pop.	±% p.a.
1968	157	—
1975	161	+0.36%
1982	133	−2.69%
1990	113	−2.02%
1999	108	−0.50%
2007	119	+1.22%
2012	100	−3.42%
2017	82	−3.89%
2023	74	−1.70%
Source: INSEE

== See also ==
- Communes of the Meurthe-et-Moselle department
