= Gogney =

- Commune
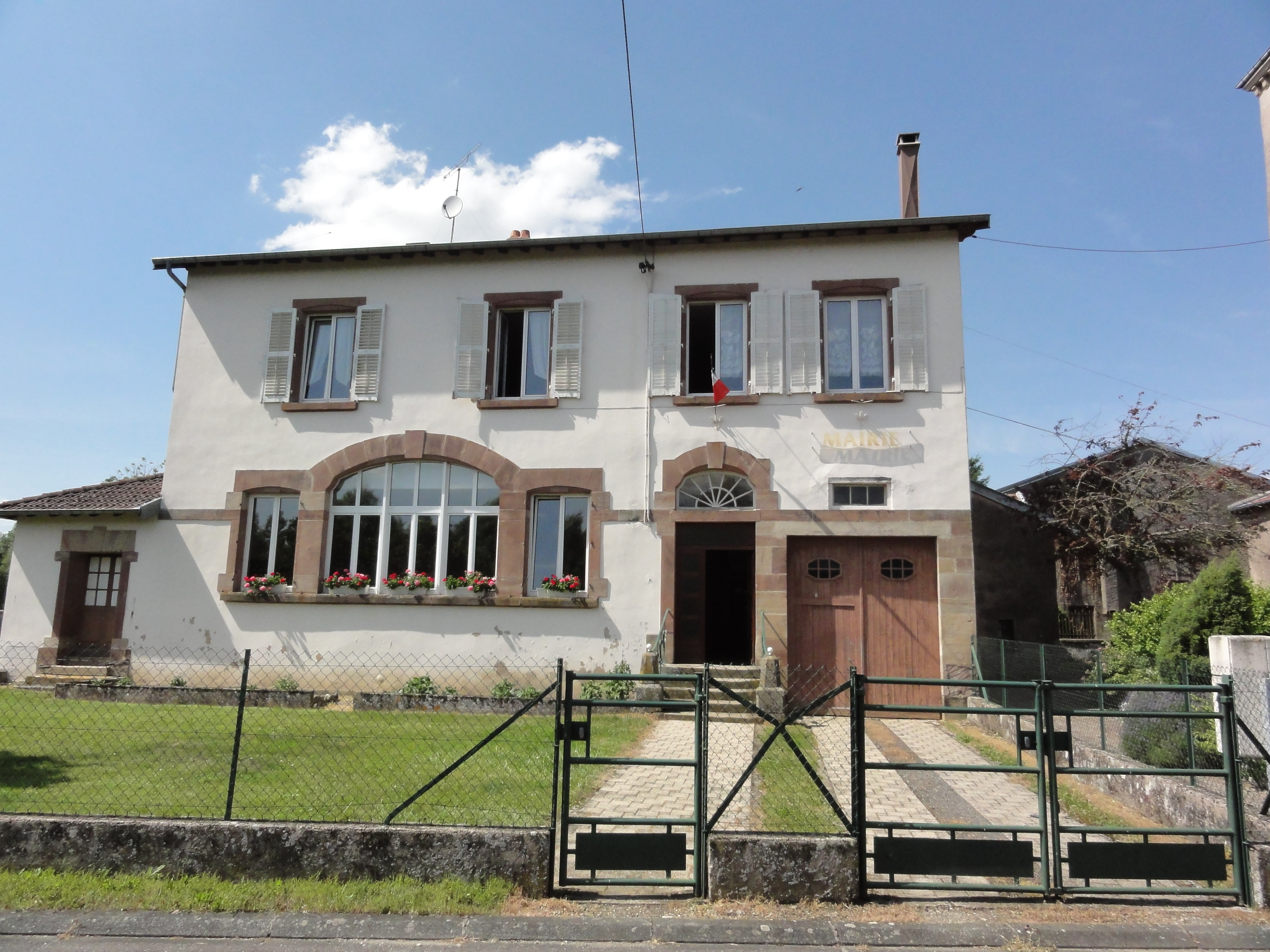
- The town hall in Gogney

- Coat of arms
- Location of Gogney
- Location within France Location within Grand Est
- Coordinates: 48°36′51″N 6°51′33″E
- Country: France
- Region: Grand Est
- Department: Meurthe-et-Moselle
- Arrondissement: Lunéville
- Canton: Baccarat

Government
  - Mayor (2020–2026): Claude Bouffier
- Area^{1}: 8.8 km^{2} (3.4 sq mi)
- Elevation: 300 m (980 ft)
- Highest elevation: 362 m (1,188 ft)
- Lowest elevation: 267 m (876 ft)
- Population (2023): 58
  - Density: 6.6/km^{2} (17/sq mi)
- Time zone: UTC+01:00 (CET)
  - Summer (DST): UTC+02:00 (CEST)
- INSEE/Postal code: 54230 /54450
- ^{1} French Land Register data, which excludes lakes, ponds, glaciers > 1 km^{2} (0.386 sq mi or 247 acres) and river estuaries.

Gogney is a commune in the Meurthe-et-Moselle department in north-eastern France.

== See also ==
- Communes of the Meurthe-et-Moselle department
