= Parux =

- Commune
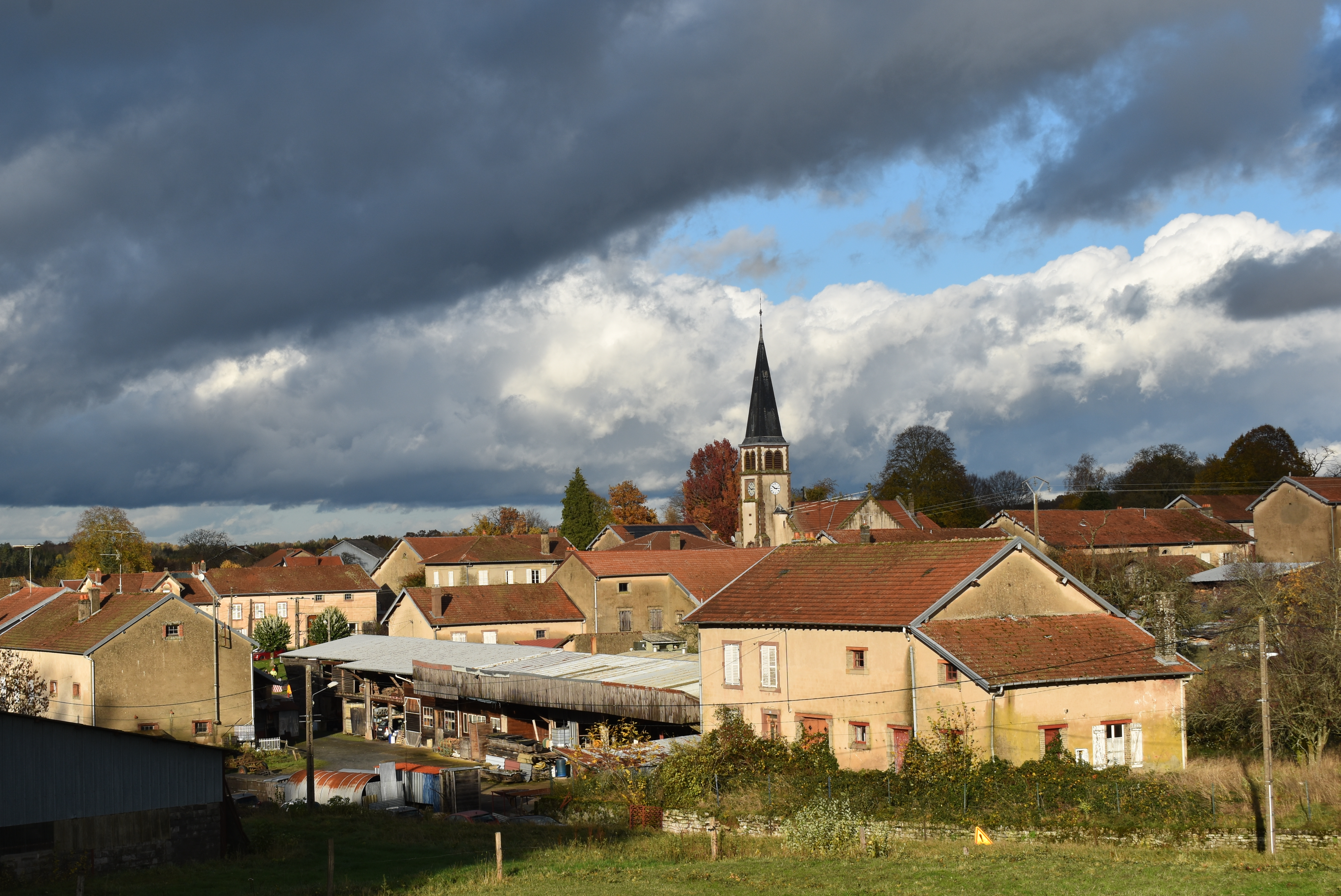
- Parux in November 2023

- Coat of arms
- Location of Parux
- Location within France Location within Grand Est
- Coordinates: 48°32′23″N 6°55′21″E
- Country: France
- Region: Grand Est
- Department: Meurthe-et-Moselle
- Arrondissement: Lunéville
- Canton: Baccarat
- Intercommunality: CC de Vezouze en Piémont

Government
  - Mayor (2020–2026): Jean-Noël Jolé
- Area^{1}: 4.38 km^{2} (1.69 sq mi)
- Elevation: 300 m (980 ft)
- Highest elevation: 403 m (1,322 ft)
- Lowest elevation: 279 m (915 ft)
- Population (2023): 69
  - Density: 16/km^{2} (41/sq mi)
- Time zone: UTC+01:00 (CET)
  - Summer (DST): UTC+02:00 (CEST)
- INSEE/Postal code: 54419 /54480
- ^{1} French Land Register data, which excludes lakes, ponds, glaciers > 1 km^{2} (0.386 sq mi or 247 acres) and river estuaries.

Parux is a commune in the Meurthe-et-Moselle department in north-eastern France.

== See also ==
- Communes of the Meurthe-et-Moselle department
