= Mouacourt =

- Commune
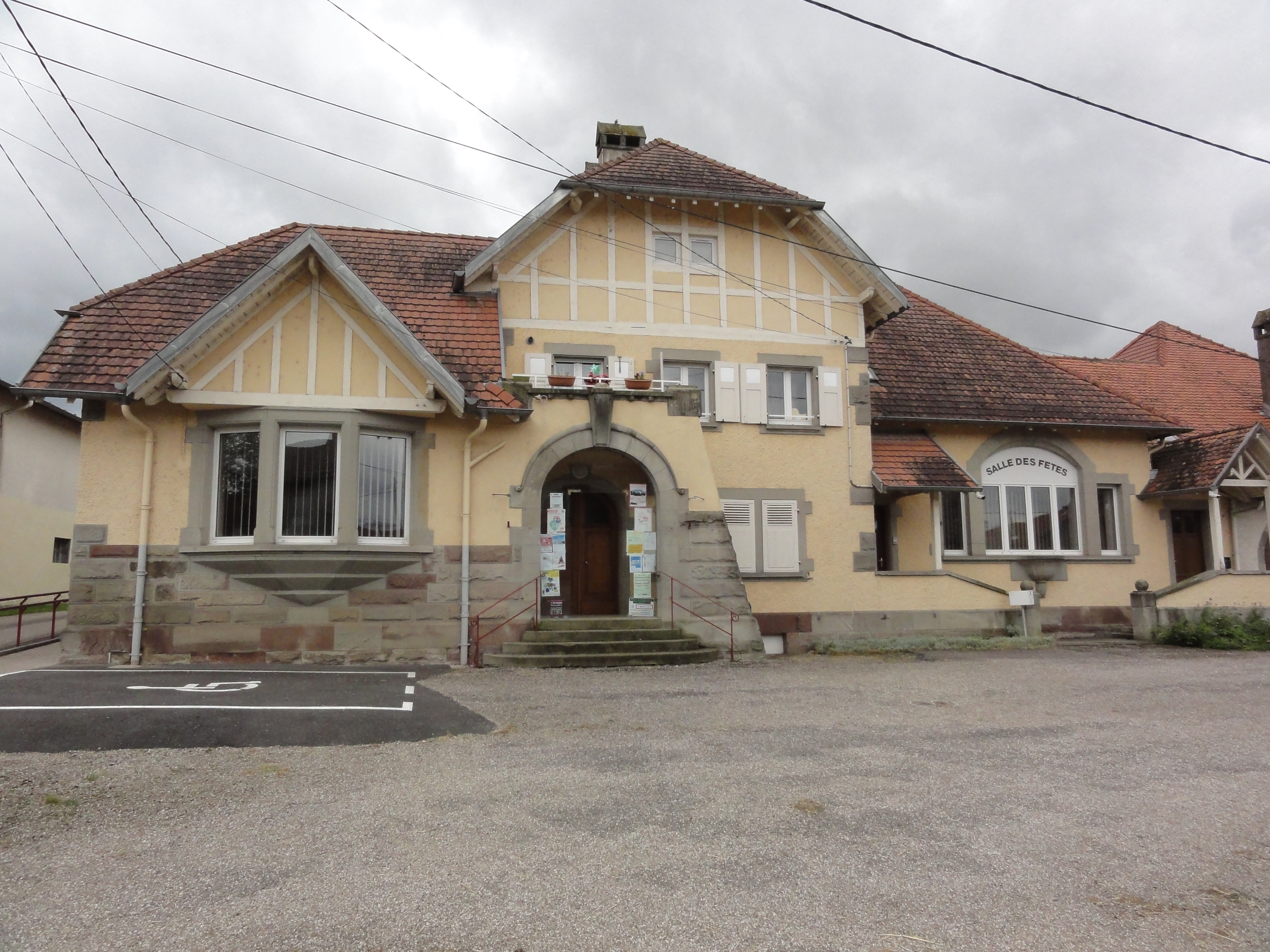
- The town hall in Mouacourt

- Coat of arms
- Location of Mouacourt
- Location within France Location within Grand Est
- Coordinates: 48°40′43″N 6°37′39″E
- Country: France
- Region: Grand Est
- Department: Meurthe-et-Moselle
- Arrondissement: Lunéville
- Canton: Baccarat
- Intercommunality: CC Pays du Sânon

Government
  - Mayor (2024–2026): Georges Edmond Sassi
- Area^{1}: 8.5 km^{2} (3.3 sq mi)
- Elevation: 250 m (820 ft)
- Highest elevation: 278 m (912 ft)
- Lowest elevation: 223 m (732 ft)
- Population (2023): 71
  - Density: 8.4/km^{2} (22/sq mi)
- Time zone: UTC+01:00 (CET)
  - Summer (DST): UTC+02:00 (CEST)
- INSEE/Postal code: 54388 /54370
- ^{1} French Land Register data, which excludes lakes, ponds, glaciers > 1 km^{2} (0.386 sq mi or 247 acres) and river estuaries.

Mouacourt (French pronunciation: [mwakuʁ]) is a commune in the Meurthe-et-Moselle department in north-eastern France.

== See also ==
- Communes of the Meurthe-et-Moselle department
