= Gondrexon =

- Commune
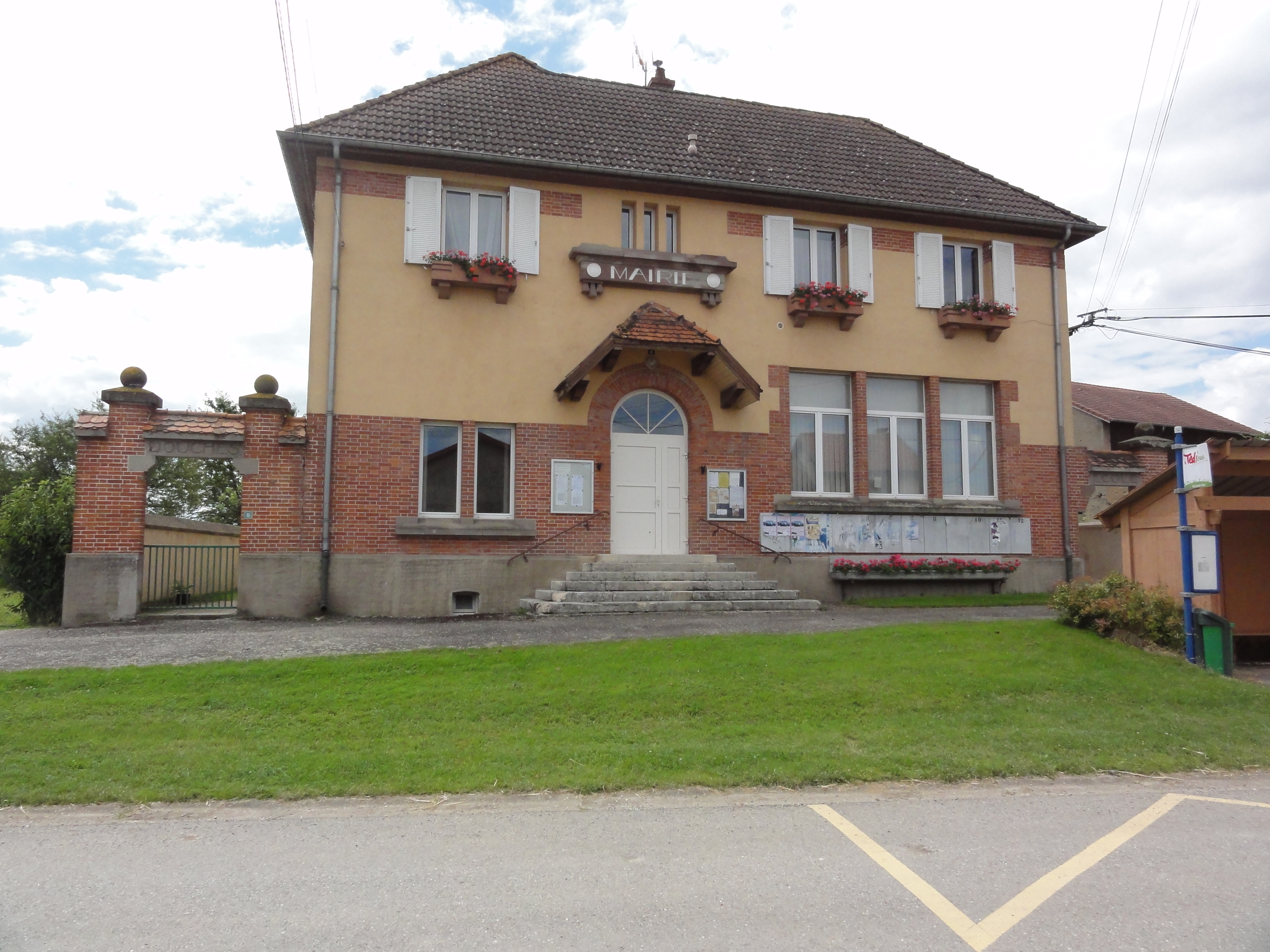
- The town hall in Gondrexon

- Coat of arms
- Location of Gondrexon
- Location within France Location within Grand Est
- Coordinates: 48°36′22″N 6°46′14″E
- Country: France
- Region: Grand Est
- Department: Meurthe-et-Moselle
- Arrondissement: Lunéville
- Canton: Baccarat

Government
  - Mayor (2020–2026): Sylvie Kippeurt
- Area^{1}: 2.49 km^{2} (0.96 sq mi)
- Elevation: 269 m (883 ft)
- Highest elevation: 290 m (950 ft)
- Lowest elevation: 255 m (837 ft)
- Population (2023): 31
  - Density: 12/km^{2} (32/sq mi)
- Time zone: UTC+01:00 (CET)
  - Summer (DST): UTC+02:00 (CEST)
- INSEE/Postal code: 54233 /54450
- ^{1} French Land Register data, which excludes lakes, ponds, glaciers > 1 km^{2} (0.386 sq mi or 247 acres) and river estuaries.

Gondrexon (French pronunciation: [ɡɔ̃dʁɛksɔ̃]) is a commune in the Meurthe-et-Moselle department in north-eastern France.

== See also ==
- Communes of the Meurthe-et-Moselle department
