= Domjevin =

- Commune
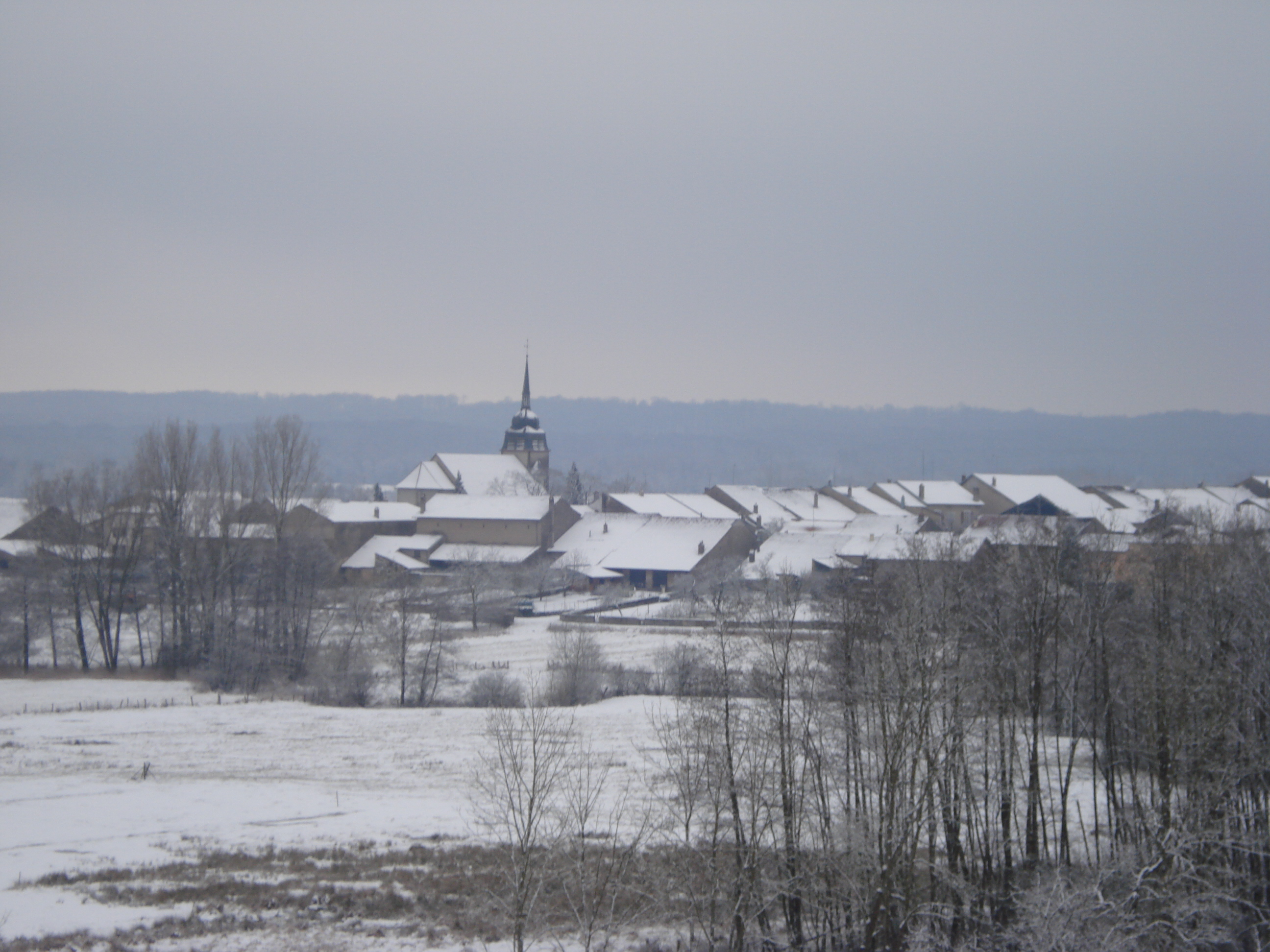
- The village of Domjevin in the snow

- Coat of arms
- Location of Domjevin
- Location within France Location within Grand Est
- Coordinates: 48°34′37″N 6°41′51″E
- Country: France
- Region: Grand Est
- Department: Meurthe-et-Moselle
- Arrondissement: Lunéville
- Canton: Baccarat
- Intercommunality: Vezouze en Piémont

Government
  - Mayor (2020–2026): Dominique Pierrat
- Area^{1}: 10.28 km^{2} (3.97 sq mi)
- Elevation: 200 m (660 ft)
- Highest elevation: 293 m (961 ft)
- Lowest elevation: 237 m (778 ft)
- Population (2023): 268
  - Density: 26.1/km^{2} (67.5/sq mi)
- Demonym(s): Domjevinois, Domjevinoise
- Time zone: UTC+01:00 (CET)
  - Summer (DST): UTC+02:00 (CEST)
- INSEE/Postal code: 54163 /54450
- ^{1} French Land Register data, which excludes lakes, ponds, glaciers > 1 km^{2} (0.386 sq mi or 247 acres) and river estuaries.

Domjevin (French pronunciation: [dɔ̃ʒ(ə)vɛ̃]) is a commune in the Meurthe-et-Moselle department in north-eastern France.

== See also ==
- Communes of the Meurthe-et-Moselle department
