= Pexonne =

- Commune
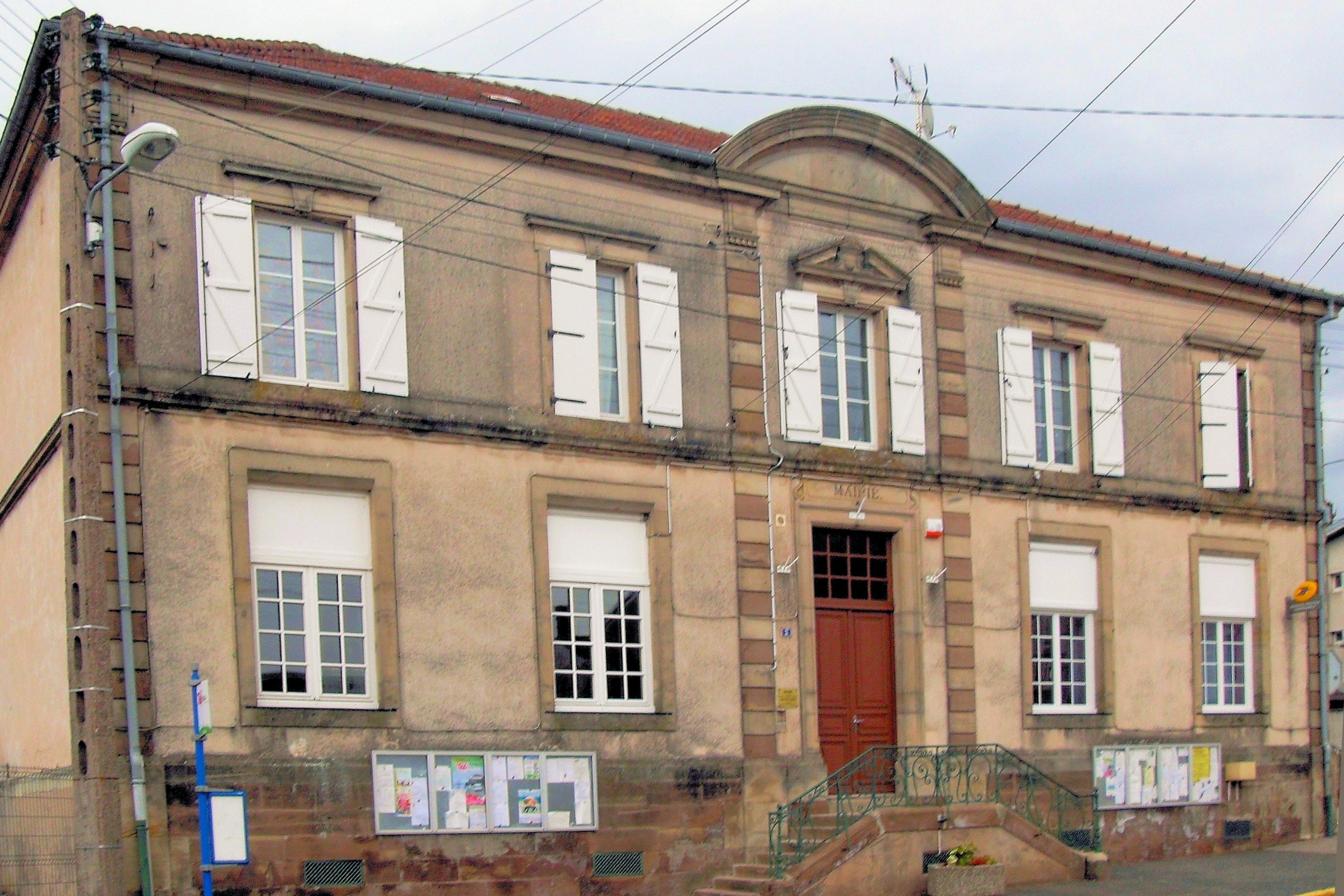
- The town hall and school in Pexonne

- Coat of arms
- Location of Pexonne
- Location within France Location within Grand Est
- Coordinates: 48°29′02″N 6°52′39″E
- Country: France
- Region: Grand Est
- Department: Meurthe-et-Moselle
- Arrondissement: Lunéville
- Canton: Baccarat
- Intercommunality: CC de Vezouze en Piémont

Government
  - Mayor (2020–2026): Dominique Foinant
- Area^{1}: 13.43 km^{2} (5.19 sq mi)
- Elevation: 296 m (971 ft)
- Highest elevation: 522 m (1,713 ft)
- Lowest elevation: 273 m (896 ft)
- Population (2023): 326
  - Density: 24.3/km^{2} (62.9/sq mi)
- Time zone: UTC+01:00 (CET)
  - Summer (DST): UTC+02:00 (CEST)
- INSEE/Postal code: 54423 /54540
- ^{1} French Land Register data, which excludes lakes, ponds, glaciers > 1 km^{2} (0.386 sq mi or 247 acres) and river estuaries.

Pexonne (French pronunciation: [pɛksɔn]) is a commune in the Meurthe-et-Moselle department in north-eastern France.

== See also ==
- Communes of the Meurthe-et-Moselle department
