= Bréménil =

- Commune
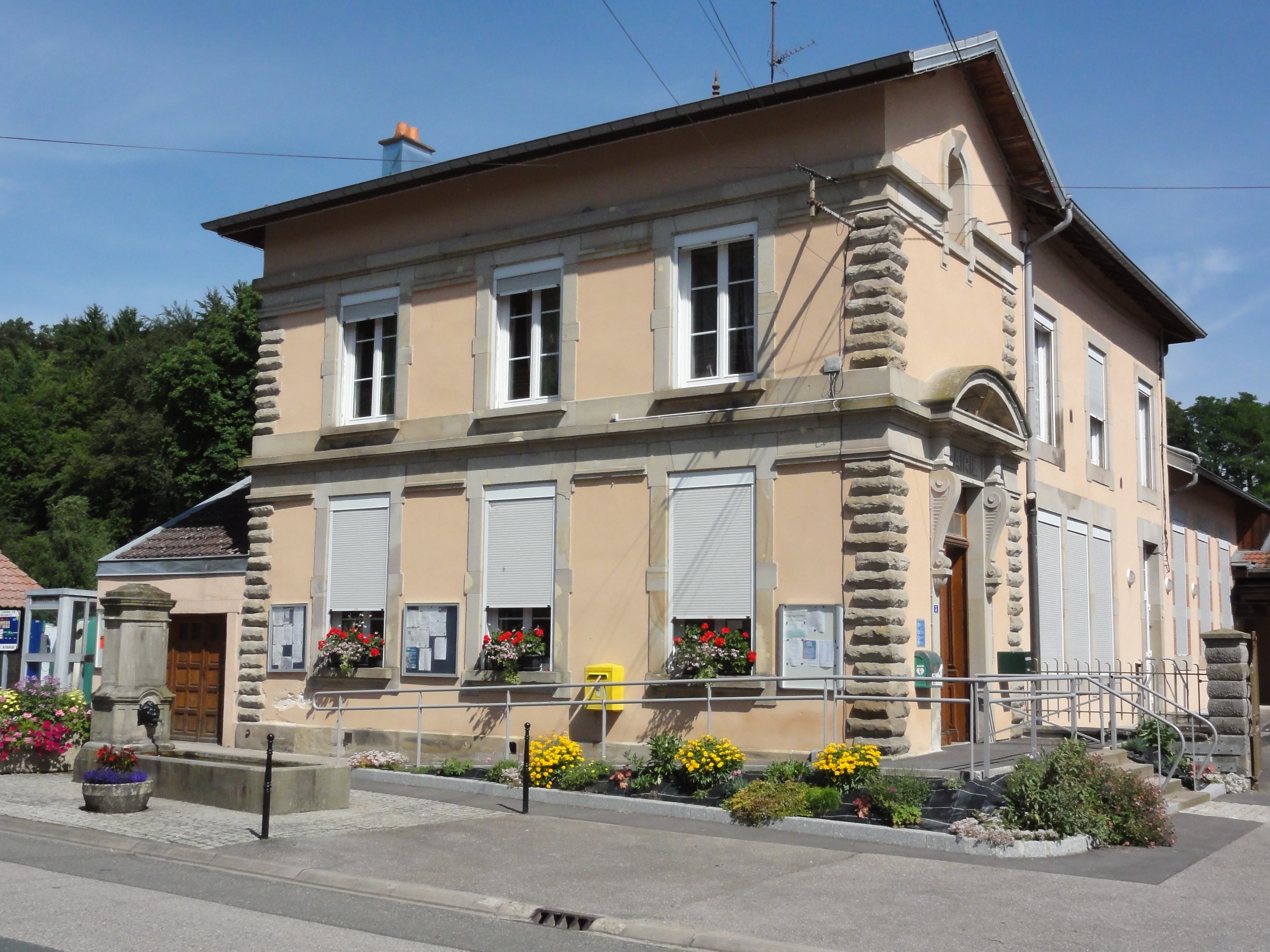
- The town hall in Bréménil

- Coat of arms
- Location of Bréménil
- Location within France Location within Grand Est
- Coordinates: 48°31′27″N 6°55′10″E
- Country: France
- Region: Grand Est
- Department: Meurthe-et-Moselle
- Arrondissement: Lunéville
- Canton: Baccarat

Government
  - Mayor (2020–2026): Christian Gallois
- Area^{1}: 5.6 km^{2} (2.2 sq mi)
- Elevation: 330 m (1,080 ft)
- Highest elevation: 425 m (1,394 ft)
- Lowest elevation: 306 m (1,004 ft)
- Population (2023): 92
  - Density: 16/km^{2} (43/sq mi)
- Time zone: UTC+01:00 (CET)
  - Summer (DST): UTC+02:00 (CEST)
- INSEE/Postal code: 54097 /54540
- ^{1} French Land Register data, which excludes lakes, ponds, glaciers > 1 km^{2} (0.386 sq mi or 247 acres) and river estuaries.

Bréménil (French pronunciation: [bʁemenil]) is a commune in the Meurthe-et-Moselle department in northeastern France.

== Population ==
Historical population
| Year | Pop. | ±% p.a. |
|---|---|---|
| 1968 | 186 | — |
| 1975 | 176 | −0.79% |
| 1982 | 155 | −1.80% |
| 1990 | 146 | −0.74% |
| 1999 | 143 | −0.23% |
| 2007 | 134 | −0.81% |
| 2012 | 121 | −2.02% |
| 2017 | 109 | −2.07% |
| 2023 | 92 | −2.79% |
Source: INSEE

== See also ==
- Communes of the Meurthe-et-Moselle department
