= Sainte-Pôle =

- Commune
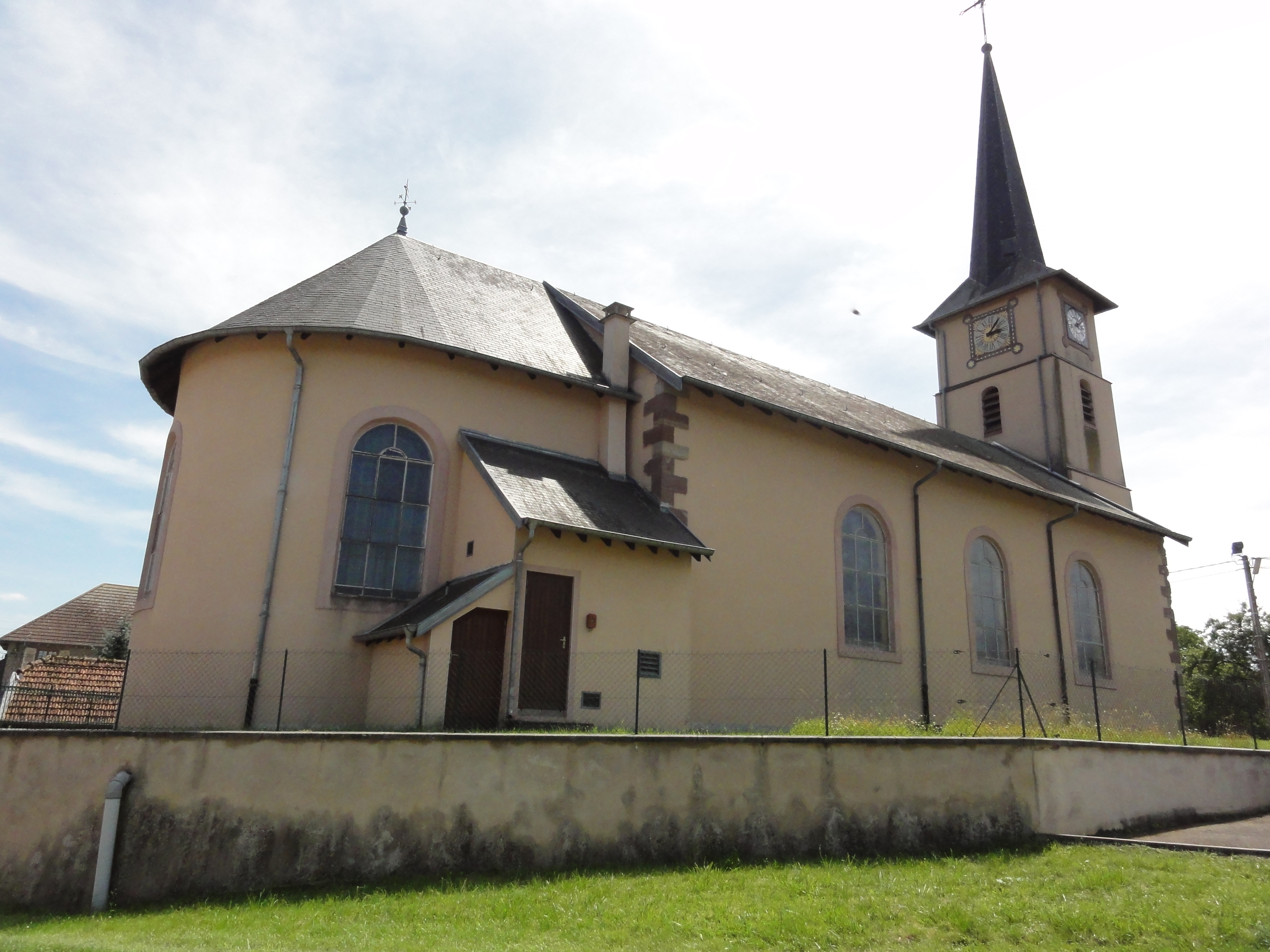
- The church in Sainte-Pôle
- Location of Sainte-Pôle
- Location within France Location within Grand Est
- Coordinates: 48°30′38″N 6°49′30″E
- Country: France
- Region: Grand Est
- Department: Meurthe-et-Moselle
- Arrondissement: Lunéville
- Canton: Baccarat
- Intercommunality: Vezouze en Piémont

Government
  - Mayor (2020–2026): François Philippe
- Area^{1}: 5.69 km^{2} (2.20 sq mi)
- Elevation: 280 m (920 ft)
- Highest elevation: 313 m (1,027 ft)
- Lowest elevation: 272 m (892 ft)
- Population (2023): 177
  - Density: 31.1/km^{2} (80.6/sq mi)
- Time zone: UTC+01:00 (CET)
  - Summer (DST): UTC+02:00 (CEST)
- INSEE/Postal code: 54484 /54540
- ^{1} French Land Register data, which excludes lakes, ponds, glaciers > 1 km^{2} (0.386 sq mi or 247 acres) and river estuaries.

Sainte-Pôle (French pronunciation: [sɛ̃t pol]) is a commune in the Meurthe-et-Moselle department in north-eastern France.

== See also ==
- Communes of the Meurthe-et-Moselle department
