= Neuviller-lès-Badonviller =

- Commune
- A view within Neuviller-lès-Badonviller

- Coat of arms
- Location of Neuviller-lès-Badonviller
- Location within France Location within Grand Est
- Coordinates: 48°31′06″N 6°52′29″E
- Country: France
- Region: Grand Est
- Department: Meurthe-et-Moselle
- Arrondissement: Lunéville
- Canton: Baccarat
- Intercommunality: CC de Vezouze en Piémont

Government
  - Mayor (2020–2026): Michel Simon
- Area^{1}: 5.75 km^{2} (2.22 sq mi)
- Elevation: 290 m (950 ft)
- Highest elevation: 341 m (1,119 ft)
- Lowest elevation: 289 m (948 ft)
- Population (2023): 89
  - Density: 15/km^{2} (40/sq mi)
- Time zone: UTC+01:00 (CET)
  - Summer (DST): UTC+02:00 (CEST)
- INSEE/Postal code: 54398 /54540
- ^{1} French Land Register data, which excludes lakes, ponds, glaciers > 1 km^{2} (0.386 sq mi or 247 acres) and river estuaries.

Neuviller-lès-Badonviller (French pronunciation: [nøvile lɛ badɔ̃vile], literally Neuviller near Badonviller) is a commune in the Meurthe-et-Moselle department in north-eastern France.

== See also ==
- Communes of the Meurthe-et-Moselle department
