= Angomont =

- Commune
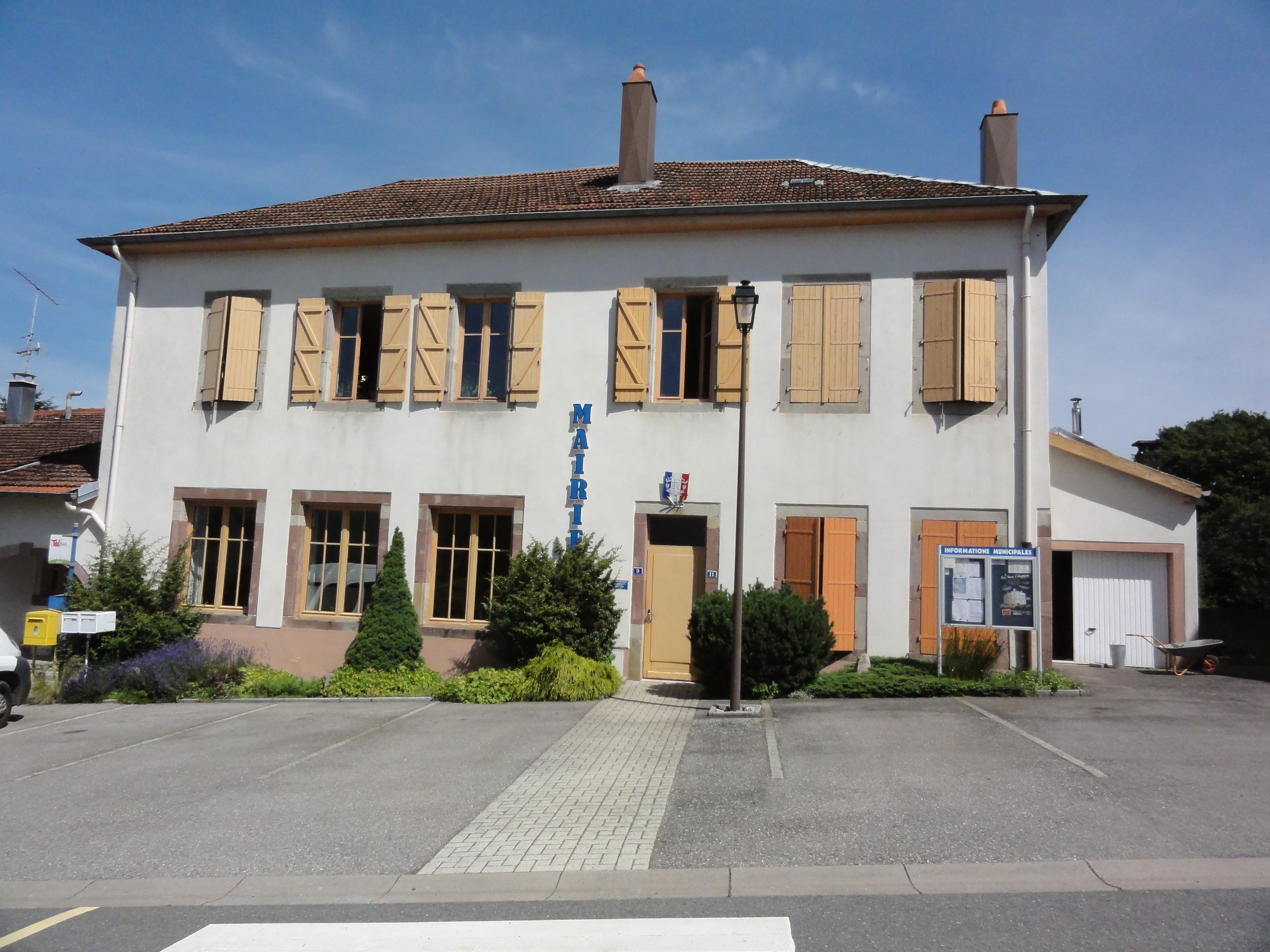
- The town hall in Angomont

- Coat of arms
- Location of Angomont
- Location within France Location within Grand Est
- Coordinates: 48°31′01″N 6°56′50″E
- Country: France
- Region: Grand Est
- Department: Meurthe-et-Moselle
- Arrondissement: Lunéville
- Canton: Baccarat
- Intercommunality: Vezouze en Piémont

Government
  - Mayor (2020–2026): Michel Cayet
- Area^{1}: 17.28 km^{2} (6.67 sq mi)
- Elevation: 420 m (1,380 ft)
- Highest elevation: 660 m (2,170 ft)
- Lowest elevation: 338 m (1,109 ft)
- Population (2023): 75
  - Density: 4.3/km^{2} (11/sq mi)
- Time zone: UTC+01:00 (CET)
  - Summer (DST): UTC+02:00 (CEST)
- INSEE/Postal code: 54017 /54540
- ^{1} French Land Register data, which excludes lakes, ponds, glaciers > 1 km^{2} (0.386 sq mi or 247 acres) and river estuaries.

Angomont (French pronunciation: [ɑ̃ɡɔmɔ̃]) is a commune in the Meurthe-et-Moselle department in northeastern France.

== Population ==
Historical population
Year	Pop.	±% p.a.
1968	118	—
1975	112	−0.74%
1982	88	−3.39%
1990	87	−0.14%
1999	90	+0.38%
2007	100	+1.33%
2012	90	−2.09%
2017	78	−2.82%
2023	75	−0.65%
Source: INSEE

== See also ==
- Communes of the Meurthe-et-Moselle department
