= Neufmaisons =

- Commune
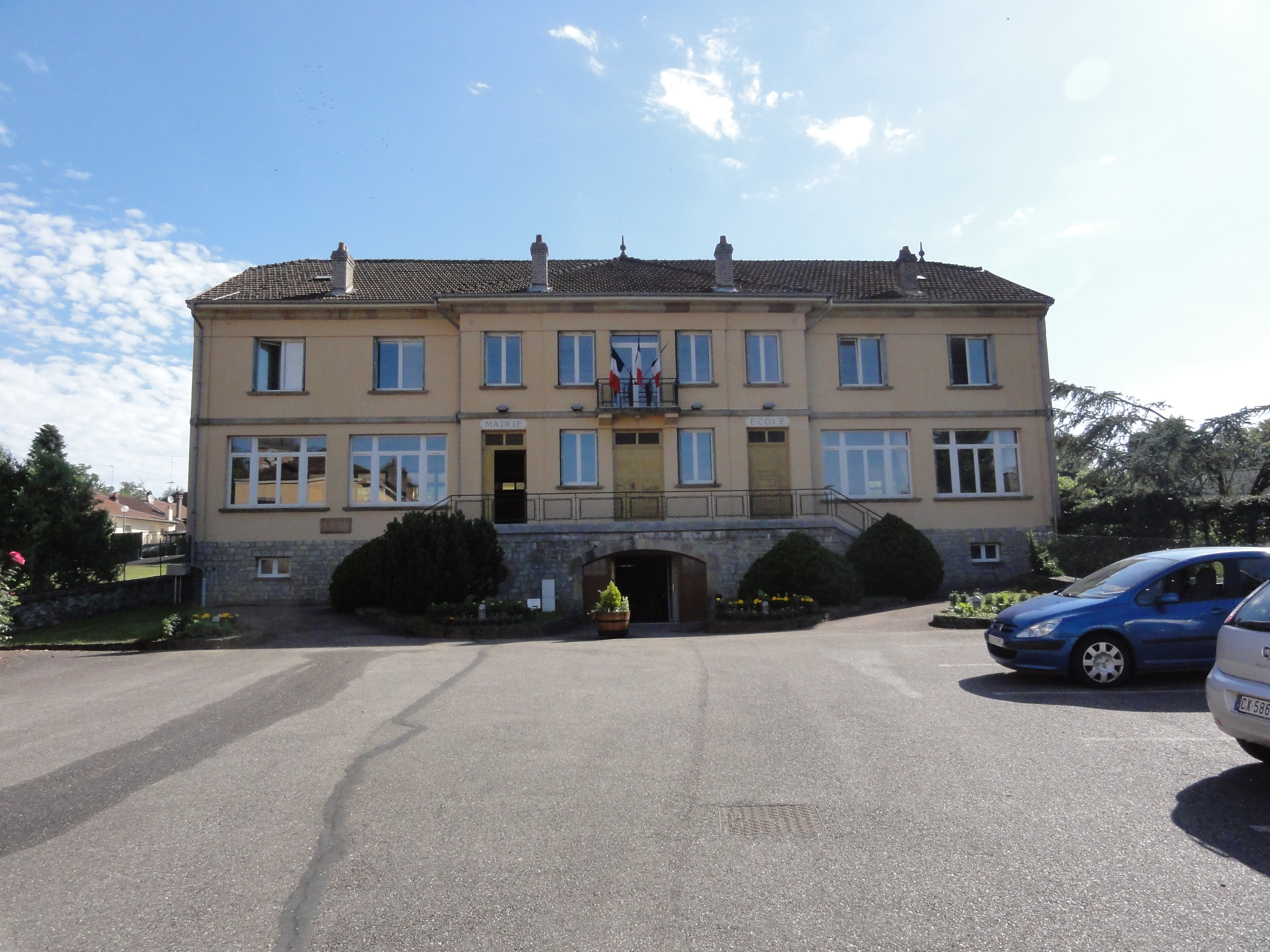
- The town hall and school in Neufmaisons

- Coat of arms
- Location of Neufmaisons
- Location within France Location within Grand Est
- Coordinates: 48°27′33″N 6°50′56″E
- Country: France
- Region: Grand Est
- Department: Meurthe-et-Moselle
- Arrondissement: Lunéville
- Canton: Baccarat
- Intercommunality: CC de Vezouze en Piémont

Government
  - Mayor (2022–2026): Henry Louis Breton
- Area^{1}: 21.63 km^{2} (8.35 sq mi)
- Elevation: 295 m (968 ft)
- Highest elevation: 534 m (1,752 ft)
- Lowest elevation: 271 m (889 ft)
- Population (2023): 208
  - Density: 9.62/km^{2} (24.9/sq mi)
- Time zone: UTC+01:00 (CET)
  - Summer (DST): UTC+02:00 (CEST)
- INSEE/Postal code: 54396 /54540
- ^{1} French Land Register data, which excludes lakes, ponds, glaciers > 1 km^{2} (0.386 sq mi or 247 acres) and river estuaries.

Neufmaisons (French pronunciation: [nœfmɛzɔ̃]) is a commune in the Meurthe-et-Moselle department in north-eastern France.

== See also ==
- Communes of the Meurthe-et-Moselle department
