= Canton of Baccarat =

Canton in Grand Est, France

Coordinates: 48.45°N 6.74°E

The canton of Baccarat is an administrative division of the Meurthe-et-Moselle department, northeastern France. Its borders were modified at the French canton reorganisation which came into effect in March 2015. Its seat is in Baccarat.

It consists of the following communes:

1. Amenoncourt
2. Ancerviller
3. Angomont
4. Arracourt
5. Athienville
6. Autrepierre
7. Avricourt
8. Azerailles
9. Baccarat
10. Badonviller
11. Barbas
12. Bathelémont
13. Bénaménil
14. Bertrambois
15. Bertrichamps
16. Bezange-la-Grande
17. Bionville
18. Blâmont
19. Blémerey
20. Bréménil
21. Brouville
22. Bures
23. Buriville
24. Chazelles-sur-Albe
25. Chenevières
26. Cirey-sur-Vezouze
27. Coincourt
28. Deneuvre
29. Domèvre-sur-Vezouze
30. Domjevin
31. Emberménil
32. Fenneviller
33. Flin
34. Fontenoy-la-Joûte
35. Fréménil
36. Frémonville
37. Gélacourt
38. Glonville
39. Gogney
40. Gondrexon
41. Hablainville
42. Halloville
43. Harbouey
44. Herbéviller
45. Igney
46. Juvrecourt
47. Lachapelle
48. Laneuveville-aux-Bois
49. Laronxe
50. Leintrey
51. Manonviller
52. Marainviller
53. Merviller
54. Mignéville
55. Montigny
56. Montreux
57. Mouacourt
58. Neufmaisons
59. Neuviller-lès-Badonviller
60. Nonhigny
61. Ogéviller
62. Parroy
63. Parux
64. Petitmont
65. Pettonville
66. Pexonne
67. Pierre-Percée
68. Raon-lès-Leau
69. Réchicourt-la-Petite
70. Réclonville
71. Reherrey
72. Reillon
73. Remoncourt
74. Repaix
75. Saint-Clément
76. Sainte-Pôle
77. Saint-Martin
78. Saint-Maurice-aux-Forges
79. Saint-Sauveur
80. Tanconville
81. Thiaville-sur-Meurthe
82. Thiébauménil
83. Vacqueville
84. Val-et-Châtillon
85. Vaucourt
86. Vaxainville
87. Vého
88. Veney
89. Verdenal
90. Xousse
91. Xures
