= Canton of Bayon =

Former canton in Meurthe-et-Moselle, France

Coordinates: 48°28′55″N 6°18′00″E

- Former canton
- Location of the canton in the arrondissement of Lunéville
- Country: France
- Region: Grand Est
- Department: Meurthe-et-Moselle
- No. of communes: {{{nbcomm}}}
- Disbanded: 2015

Government
  - Representatives: Christophe Sonrel
- Area: 188.53 km^{2} (72.79 sq mi)
- Population (2012): 13,397
  - Density: 71.060/km^{2} (184.05/sq mi)

The canton of Bayon (French: Canton de Bayon) is a former French canton located in the department of Meurthe-et-Moselle in the Lorraine region (now part of Grand Est). This canton was organized around Bayon in the arrondissement of Lunéville. It is now part of the canton of Lunéville-2.

The last general councillor from this canton was Christophe Sonrel (PCF), elected in 2011.

== Composition ==
The canton of Bayon grouped together 27 municipalities and had 13,397 inhabitants (2012 census without double counts).

1. Barbonville
2. Bayon
3. Blainville-sur-l'Eau
4. Borville
5. Brémoncourt
6. Charmois
7. Clayeures
8. Damelevières
9. Domptail-en-l'Air
10. Einvaux
11. Froville
12. Haigneville
13. Haussonville
14. Landécourt
15. Lorey
16. Loromontzey
17. Méhoncourt
18. Romain
19. Rozelieures
20. Saint-Boingt
21. Saint-Germain
22. Saint-Mard
23. Saint-Rémy-aux-Bois
24. Velle-sur-Moselle
25. Vigneulles
26. Villacourt
27. Virecourt
