= Canton of Gerbéviller =

Former canton in Meurthe-et-Moselle, France

Coordinates: 48°29′32″N 6°28′09″E

- Former canton
- Location of the canton in the arrondissement of Lunéville
- Country: France
- Region: Grand Est
- Department: Meurthe-et-Moselle
- No. of communes: {{{nbcomm}}}
- Disbanded: 2015

Government
  - Representatives: Yves Willer
- Area: 181.07 km^{2} (69.91 sq mi)
- Population (2012): 6,797
  - Density: 37.54/km^{2} (97.22/sq mi)

The canton of Gerbéviller (French: Canton de Gerbéviller) is a former French canton located in the department of Meurthe-et-Moselle in the Lorraine region (now part of Grand Est). This canton was organized around Gerbéviller in the arrondissement of Lunéville. It is now part of the canton of Baccarat.

The last general councillor from this canton was Yves Willer (DVG), elected in 1994.

== Composition ==
The canton of Gerbéviller grouped together 19 municipalities and had 6,797 inhabitants (2012 census without double counts).

1. Essey-la-Côte
2. Fraimbois
3. Franconville
4. Gerbéviller
5. Giriviller
6. Haudonville
7. Lamath
8. Magnières
9. Mattexey
10. Mont-sur-Meurthe
11. Moriviller
12. Moyen
13. Rehainviller
14. Remenoville
15. Seranville
16. Vallois
17. Vathiménil
18. Vennezey
19. Xermaménil
