= Tonnoy =

- Commune
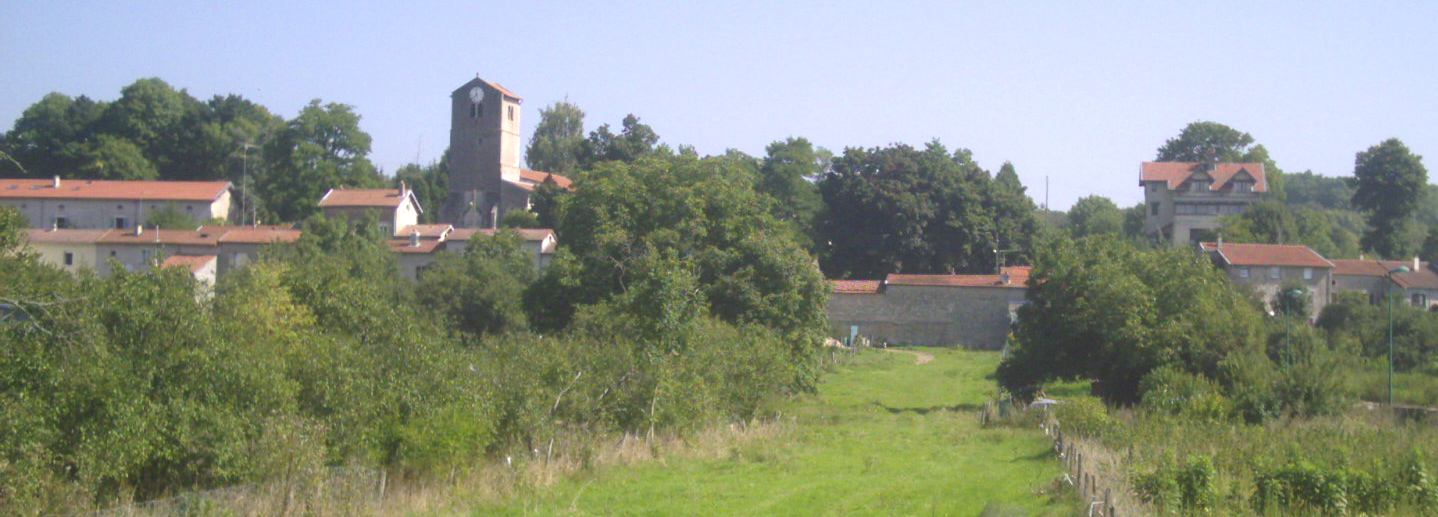
- A general view of Tonnoy

- Coat of arms
- Location of Tonnoy
- Location within France Location within Grand Est
- Coordinates: 48°33′07″N 6°15′02″E
- Country: France
- Region: Grand Est
- Department: Meurthe-et-Moselle
- Arrondissement: Nancy
- Canton: Lunéville-2
- Intercommunality: Pays du Sel et du Vermois

Government
  - Mayor (2020–2026): Yvon Valette
- Area^{1}: 12.35 km^{2} (4.77 sq mi)
- Elevation: 260 m (850 ft)
- Highest elevation: 369 m (1,211 ft)
- Lowest elevation: 229 m (751 ft)
- Population (2023): 645
  - Density: 52.2/km^{2} (135/sq mi)
- Time zone: UTC+01:00 (CET)
  - Summer (DST): UTC+02:00 (CEST)
- INSEE/Postal code: 54527 /54210
- Website: mairietonnoy.fr
- ^{1} French Land Register data, which excludes lakes, ponds, glaciers > 1 km^{2} (0.386 sq mi or 247 acres) and river estuaries.

Tonnoy (French pronunciation: [tɔnwa]) is a commune in the Meurthe-et-Moselle department in north-eastern France.

== See also ==
- Communes of the Meurthe-et-Moselle department
