= Ferrières, Meurthe-et-Moselle =

Ferrières
- Commune
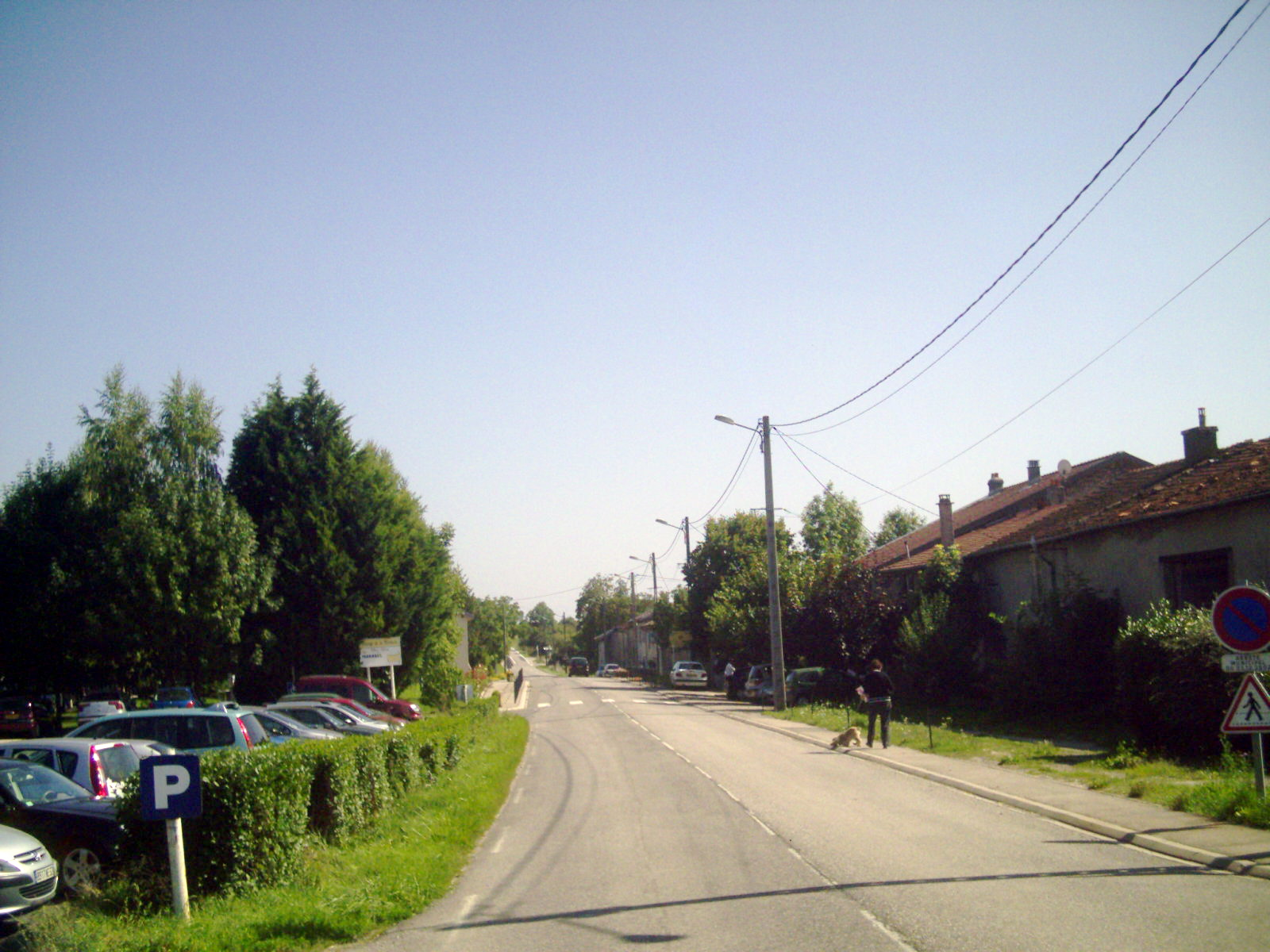
- A view within Ferrières

- Coat of arms
- Location of Ferrières
- Location within France Location within Grand Est
- Coordinates: 48°33′19″N 6°17′40″E
- Country: France
- Region: Grand Est
- Department: Meurthe-et-Moselle
- Arrondissement: Nancy
- Canton: Lunéville-2
- Intercommunality: Pays du Sel et du Vermois

Government
  - Mayor (2020–2026): Bernard Leheux
- Area^{1}: 6.25 km^{2} (2.41 sq mi)
- Elevation: 300 m (980 ft)
- Highest elevation: 361 m (1,184 ft)
- Lowest elevation: 254 m (833 ft)
- Population (2023): 361
  - Density: 57.8/km^{2} (150/sq mi)
- Time zone: UTC+01:00 (CET)
  - Summer (DST): UTC+02:00 (CEST)
- INSEE/Postal code: 54192 /54210
- ^{1} French Land Register data, which excludes lakes, ponds, glaciers > 1 km^{2} (0.386 sq mi or 247 acres) and river estuaries.

Ferrières is a commune in the Meurthe-et-Moselle department in north-eastern France.

== See also ==
- Communes of the Meurthe-et-Moselle department
