= Haigneville =

- Commune
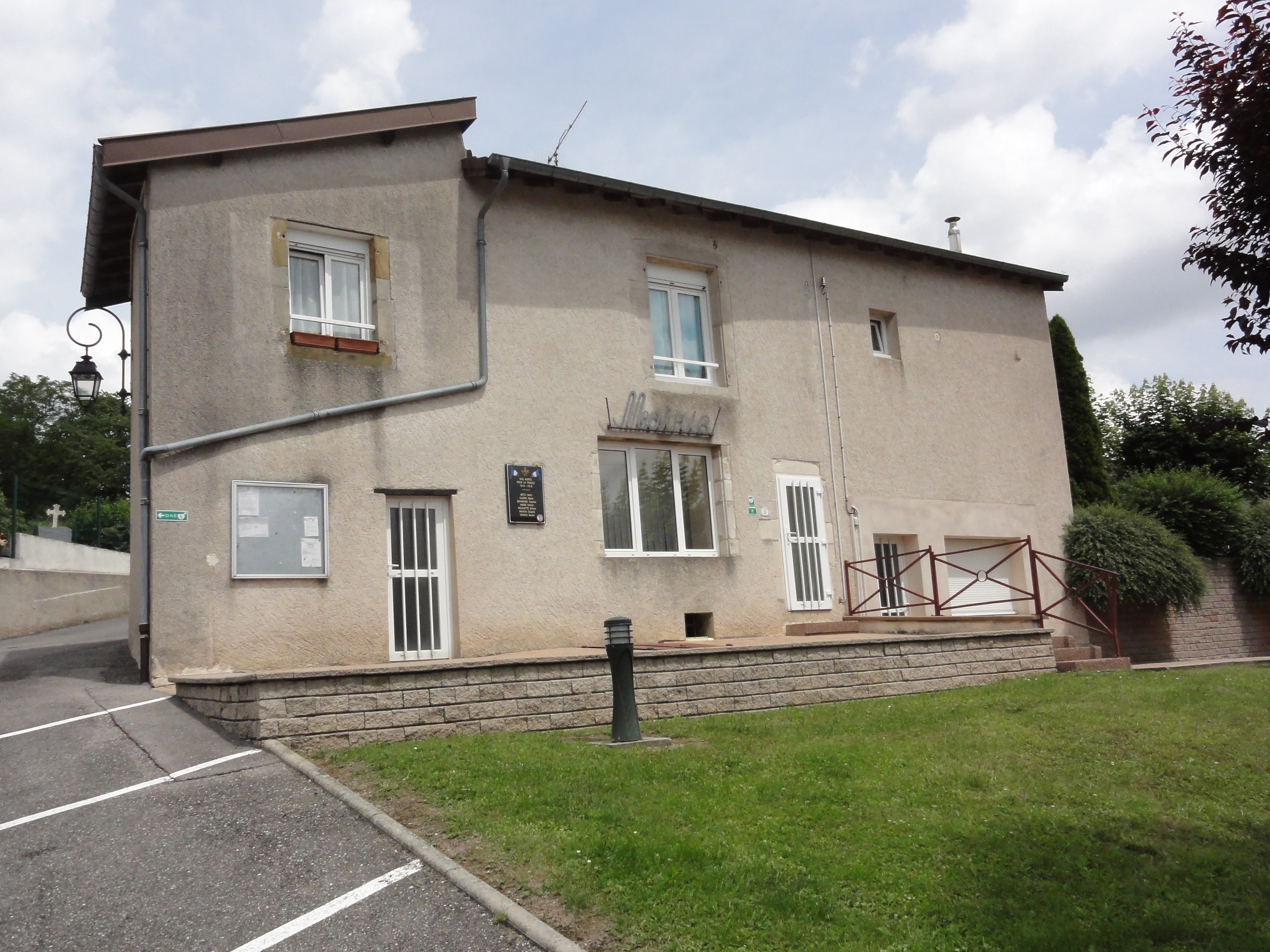
- The town hall in Haigneville

- Coat of arms
- Location of Haigneville
- Location within France Location within Grand Est
- Coordinates: 48°29′14″N 6°20′38″E
- Country: France
- Region: Grand Est
- Department: Meurthe-et-Moselle
- Arrondissement: Lunéville
- Canton: Lunéville-2
- Intercommunality: CC Meurthe, Mortagne, Moselle

Government
  - Mayor (2020–2026): Jacques Lentretien
- Area^{1}: 2.85 km^{2} (1.10 sq mi)
- Highest elevation: 406 m (1,332 ft)
- Lowest elevation: 249 m (817 ft)
- Population (2023): 53
  - Density: 19/km^{2} (48/sq mi)
- Time zone: UTC+01:00 (CET)
  - Summer (DST): UTC+02:00 (CEST)
- INSEE/Postal code: 54245 /54290
- ^{1} French Land Register data, which excludes lakes, ponds, glaciers > 1 km^{2} (0.386 sq mi or 247 acres) and river estuaries.

Haigneville (French pronunciation: [ɛɲvil]) is a commune in the Meurthe-et-Moselle department in north-eastern France.

== See also ==
- Communes of the Meurthe-et-Moselle department
