= Clayeures =

- Commune
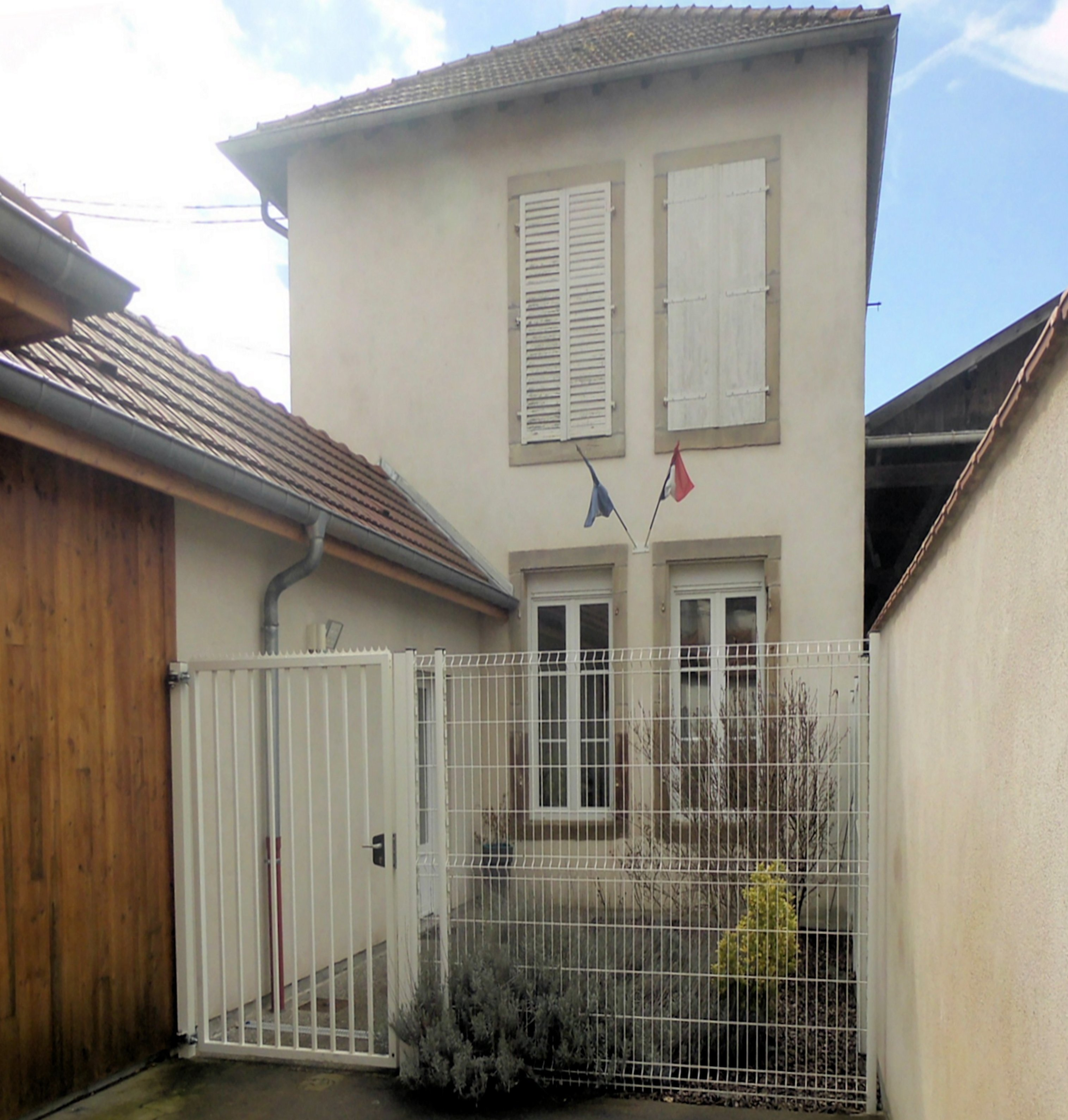
- The town hall in Clayeures

- Coat of arms
- Location of Clayeures
- Location within France Location within Grand Est
- Coordinates: 48°28′22″N 6°24′24″E
- Country: France
- Region: Grand Est
- Department: Meurthe-et-Moselle
- Arrondissement: Lunéville
- Canton: Lunéville-2
- Intercommunality: CC Meurthe, Mortagne, Moselle

Government
  - Mayor (2020–2026): Christian Cendre
- Area^{1}: 9.21 km^{2} (3.56 sq mi)
- Elevation: 240 m (790 ft)
- Highest elevation: 351 m (1,152 ft)
- Lowest elevation: 252 m (827 ft)
- Population (2023): 175
  - Density: 19.0/km^{2} (49.2/sq mi)
- Time zone: UTC+01:00 (CET)
  - Summer (DST): UTC+02:00 (CEST)
- INSEE/Postal code: 54130 /54290
- ^{1} French Land Register data, which excludes lakes, ponds, glaciers > 1 km^{2} (0.386 sq mi or 247 acres) and river estuaries.

Clayeures (French pronunciation: [klɛjœʁ]) is a commune in the Meurthe-et-Moselle department in north-eastern France.

== See also ==
- Communes of the Meurthe-et-Moselle department
