= Vathiménil =

- Commune
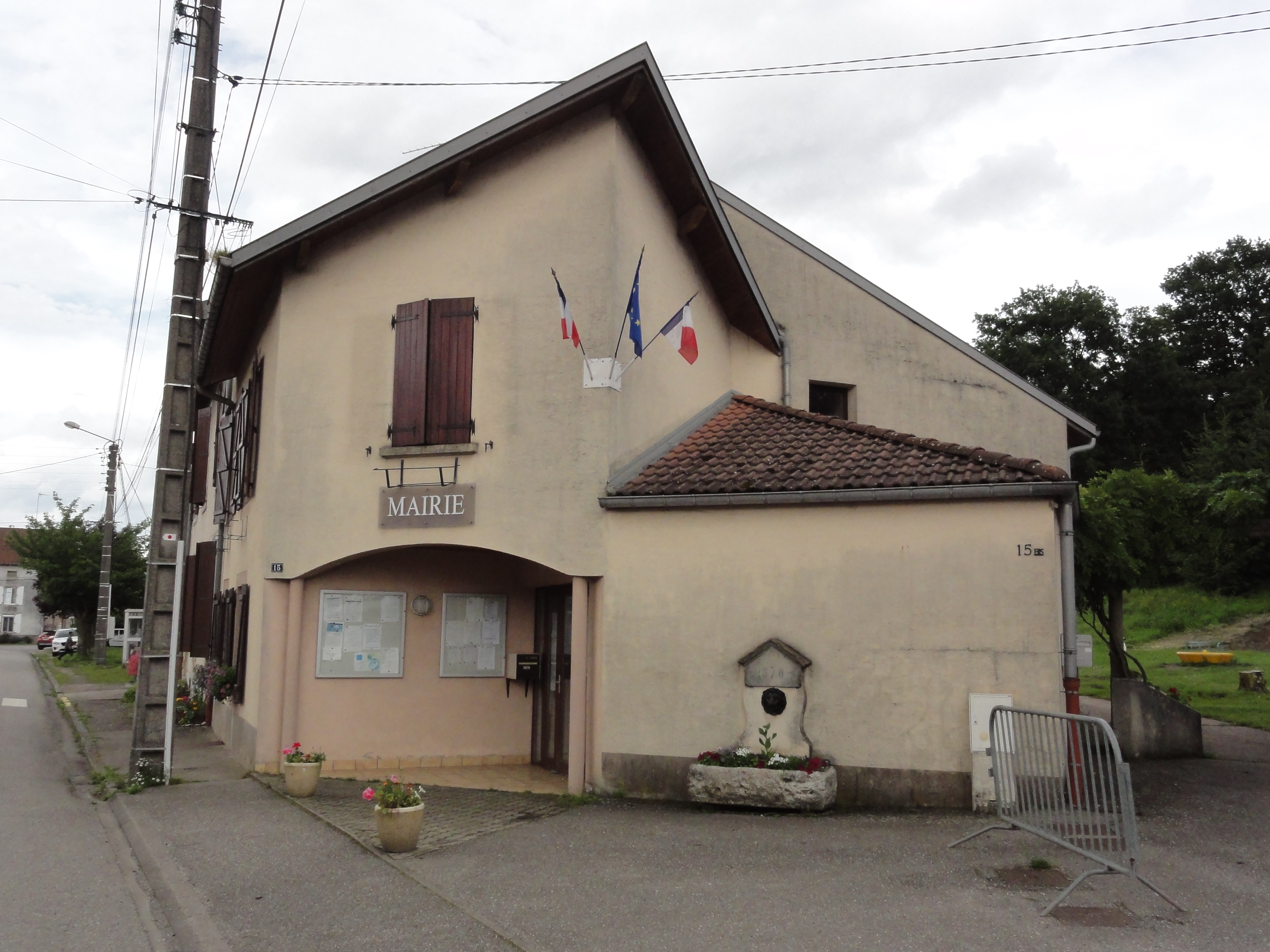
- The town hall in Vathiménil

- Coat of arms
- Location of Vathiménil
- Location within France Location within Grand Est
- Coordinates: 48°30′31″N 6°37′28″E
- Country: France
- Region: Grand Est
- Department: Meurthe-et-Moselle
- Arrondissement: Lunéville
- Canton: Lunéville-2
- Intercommunality: Territoire de Lunéville à Baccarat

Government
  - Mayor (2020–2026): Ludwig Mischler
- Area^{1}: 12.3 km^{2} (4.7 sq mi)
- Elevation: 262 m (860 ft)
- Highest elevation: 311 m (1,020 ft)
- Lowest elevation: 237 m (778 ft)
- Population (2023): 317
  - Density: 25.8/km^{2} (66.8/sq mi)
- Time zone: UTC+01:00 (CET)
  - Summer (DST): UTC+02:00 (CEST)
- INSEE/Postal code: 54550 /54122
- ^{1} French Land Register data, which excludes lakes, ponds, glaciers > 1 km^{2} (0.386 sq mi or 247 acres) and river estuaries.

Vathiménil (French pronunciation: [vatimenil]) is a commune in the Meurthe-et-Moselle department in north-eastern France.

== See also ==
- Communes of the Meurthe-et-Moselle department
