= Barbonville =

- Commune
- Coat of arms
- Location of Barbonville
- Location within France Location within Grand Est
- Coordinates: 48°33′18″N 6°20′41″E
- Country: France
- Region: Grand Est
- Department: Meurthe-et-Moselle
- Arrondissement: Lunéville
- Canton: Lunéville-2
- Intercommunality: CC Meurthe Mortagne Moselle

Government
  - Mayor (2021–2026): Sylvie Hongniat
- Area^{1}: 10.81 km^{2} (4.17 sq mi)
- Elevation: 225 m (738 ft)
- Highest elevation: 335 m (1,099 ft)
- Lowest elevation: 209 m (686 ft)
- Population (2023): 434
  - Density: 40.1/km^{2} (104/sq mi)
- Time zone: UTC+01:00 (CET)
  - Summer (DST): UTC+02:00 (CEST)
- INSEE/Postal code: 54045 /54360
- ^{1} French Land Register data, which excludes lakes, ponds, glaciers > 1 km^{2} (0.386 sq mi or 247 acres) and river estuaries.

Barbonville (French pronunciation: [baʁbɔ̃vil]) is a commune in the Meurthe-et-Moselle department in northeastern France. It is part of the community of communes of Meurthe Mortagne Moselle.

The parish church is dedicated to Saint-Remy.

The main local business is the tree nursery Pepinieres Koenig, founded in 1929.

== Population ==
Historical population
Year	Pop.	±% p.a.
1968	207	—
1975	241	+2.20%
1982	312	+3.76%
1990	359	+1.77%
1999	335	−0.77%
2007	384	+1.72%
2012	428	+2.19%
2017	437	+0.42%
2023	434	−0.11%
Source: INSEE

== See also ==
- Communes of the Meurthe-et-Moselle department
