= Villacourt =

- Commune
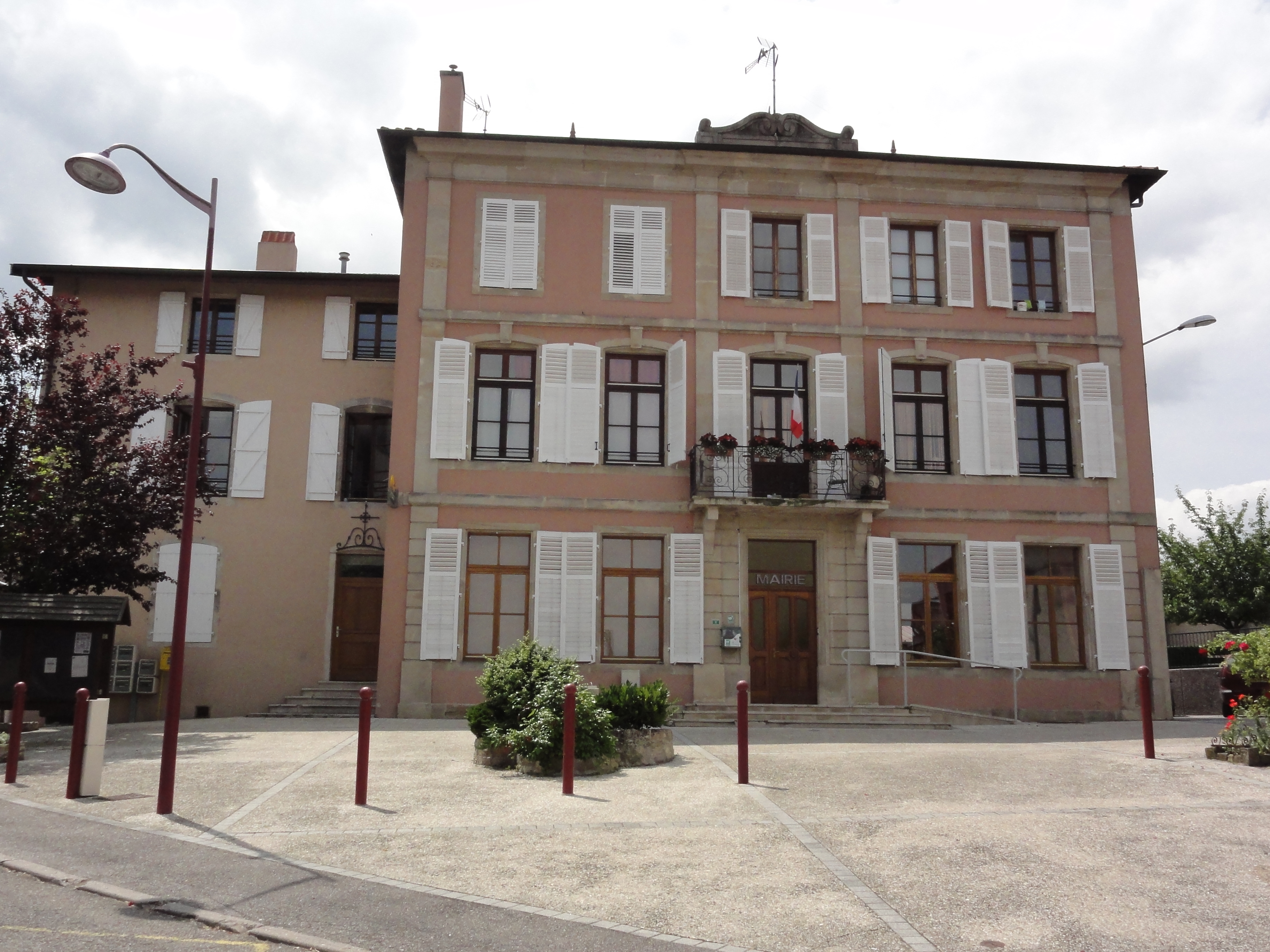
- The town hall in Villacourt

- Coat of arms
- Location of Villacourt
- Location within France Location within Grand Est
- Coordinates: 48°27′24″N 6°21′00″E
- Country: France
- Region: Grand Est
- Department: Meurthe-et-Moselle
- Arrondissement: Lunéville
- Canton: Lunéville-2
- Intercommunality: CC Meurthe, Mortagne, Moselle

Government
  - Mayor (2020–2026): Hervé Poirot
- Area^{1}: 14.1 km^{2} (5.4 sq mi)
- Elevation: 360 m (1,180 ft)
- Highest elevation: 359 m (1,178 ft)
- Lowest elevation: 254 m (833 ft)
- Population (2023): 360
  - Density: 26/km^{2} (66/sq mi)
- Time zone: UTC+01:00 (CET)
  - Summer (DST): UTC+02:00 (CEST)
- INSEE/Postal code: 54567 /54290
- ^{1} French Land Register data, which excludes lakes, ponds, glaciers > 1 km^{2} (0.386 sq mi or 247 acres) and river estuaries.

Villacourt (French pronunciation: [vilakuʁ]) is a commune in the Meurthe-et-Moselle department in north-eastern France.

== See also ==
- Communes of the Meurthe-et-Moselle department
