= Virecourt =

- Commune
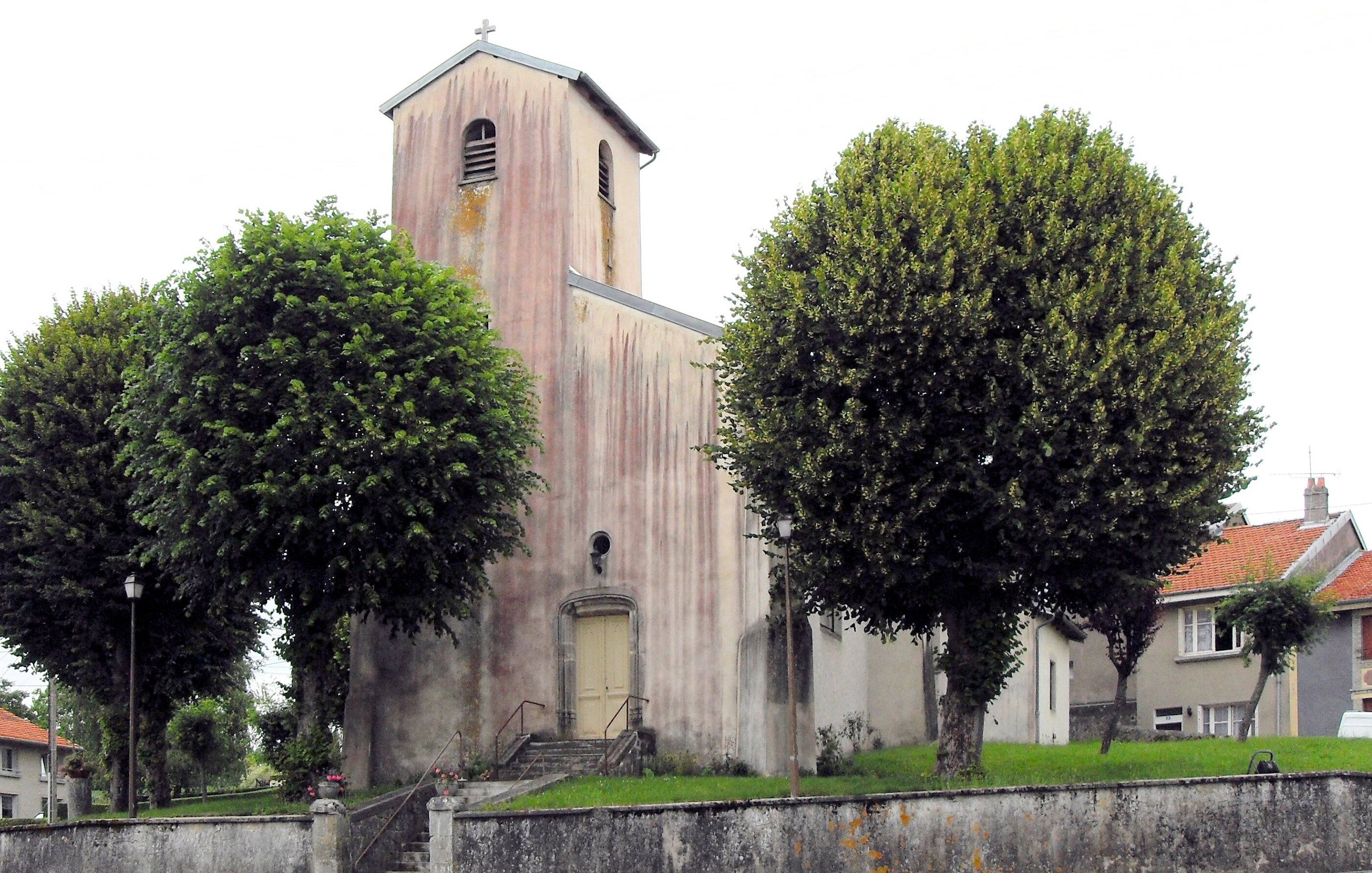
- The church in Virecourt

- Coat of arms
- Location of Virecourt
- Location within France Location within Grand Est
- Coordinates: 48°27′46″N 6°19′14″E
- Country: France
- Region: Grand Est
- Department: Meurthe-et-Moselle
- Arrondissement: Lunéville
- Canton: Lunéville-2
- Intercommunality: CC Meurthe, Mortagne, Moselle

Government
  - Mayor (2020–2026): Yves Thiébaut
- Area^{1}: 5.06 km^{2} (1.95 sq mi)
- Elevation: 267 m (876 ft)
- Highest elevation: 336 m (1,102 ft)
- Lowest elevation: 244 m (801 ft)
- Population (2023): 487
  - Density: 96.2/km^{2} (249/sq mi)
- Time zone: UTC+01:00 (CET)
  - Summer (DST): UTC+02:00 (CEST)
- INSEE/Postal code: 54585 /54290
- ^{1} French Land Register data, which excludes lakes, ponds, glaciers > 1 km^{2} (0.386 sq mi or 247 acres) and river estuaries.

Virecourt (French pronunciation: [viʁkuʁ]) is a commune on the river Moselle in the Meurthe-et-Moselle department in north-eastern France.

== See also ==
- Communes of the Meurthe-et-Moselle department
