= Landécourt =

- Commune
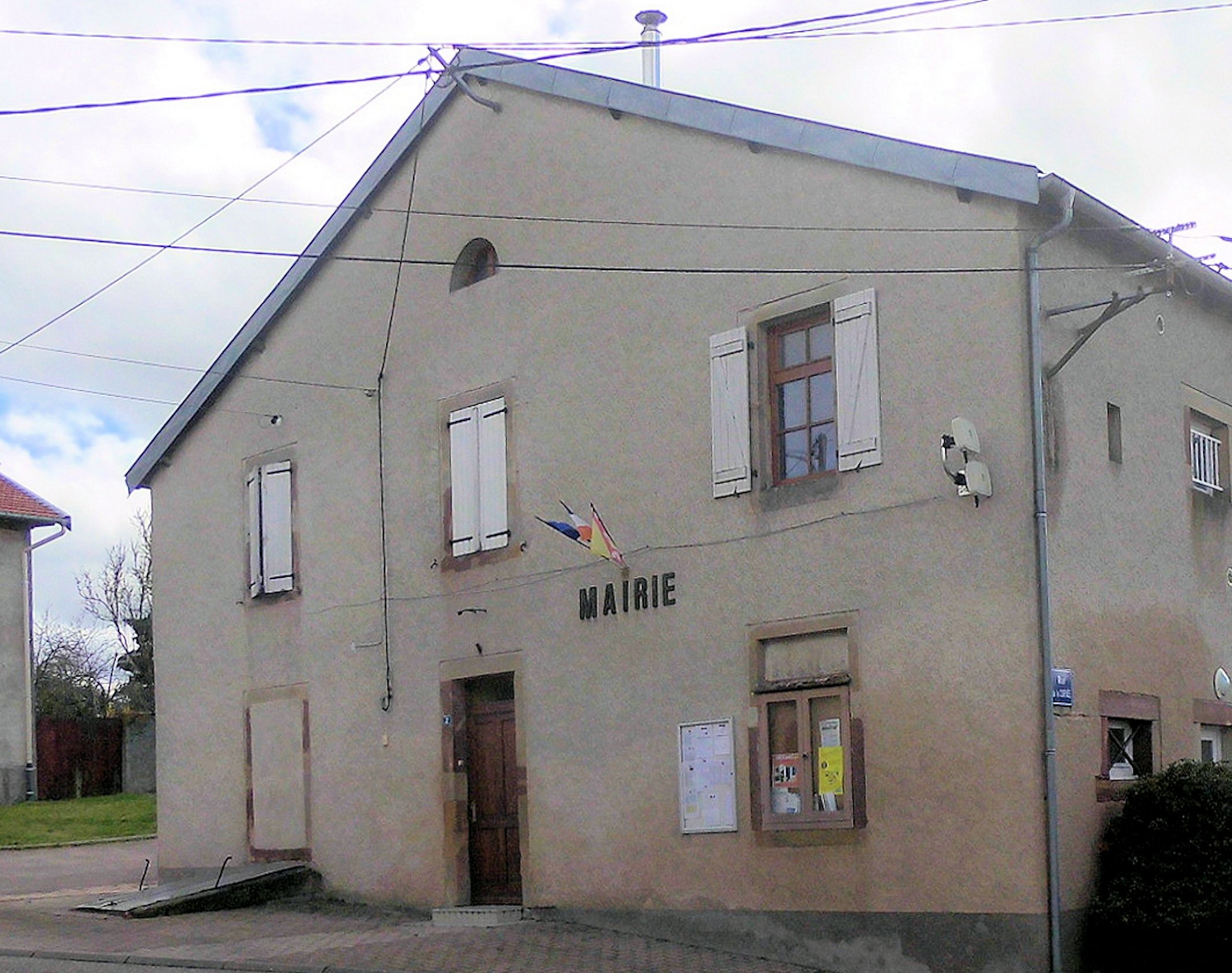
- The town hall in Landécourt

- Coat of arms
- Location of Landécourt
- Location within France Location within Grand Est
- Coordinates: 48°30′01″N 6°25′02″E
- Country: France
- Region: Grand Est
- Department: Meurthe-et-Moselle
- Arrondissement: Lunéville
- Canton: Lunéville-2
- Intercommunality: CC Meurthe, Mortagne, Moselle

Government
  - Mayor (2020–2026): Jean-Marie Babel
- Area^{1}: 5.82 km^{2} (2.25 sq mi)
- Elevation: 270 m (890 ft)
- Highest elevation: 344 m (1,129 ft)
- Lowest elevation: 235 m (771 ft)
- Population (2023): 86
  - Density: 15/km^{2} (38/sq mi)
- Time zone: UTC+01:00 (CET)
  - Summer (DST): UTC+02:00 (CEST)
- INSEE/Postal code: 54293 /54360
- ^{1} French Land Register data, which excludes lakes, ponds, glaciers > 1 km^{2} (0.386 sq mi or 247 acres) and river estuaries.

Landécourt (French pronunciation: [lɑ̃dekuʁ]) is a commune in the Meurthe-et-Moselle department in north-eastern France.

== See also ==
- Communes of the Meurthe-et-Moselle department
