= Saint-Boingt =

- Commune
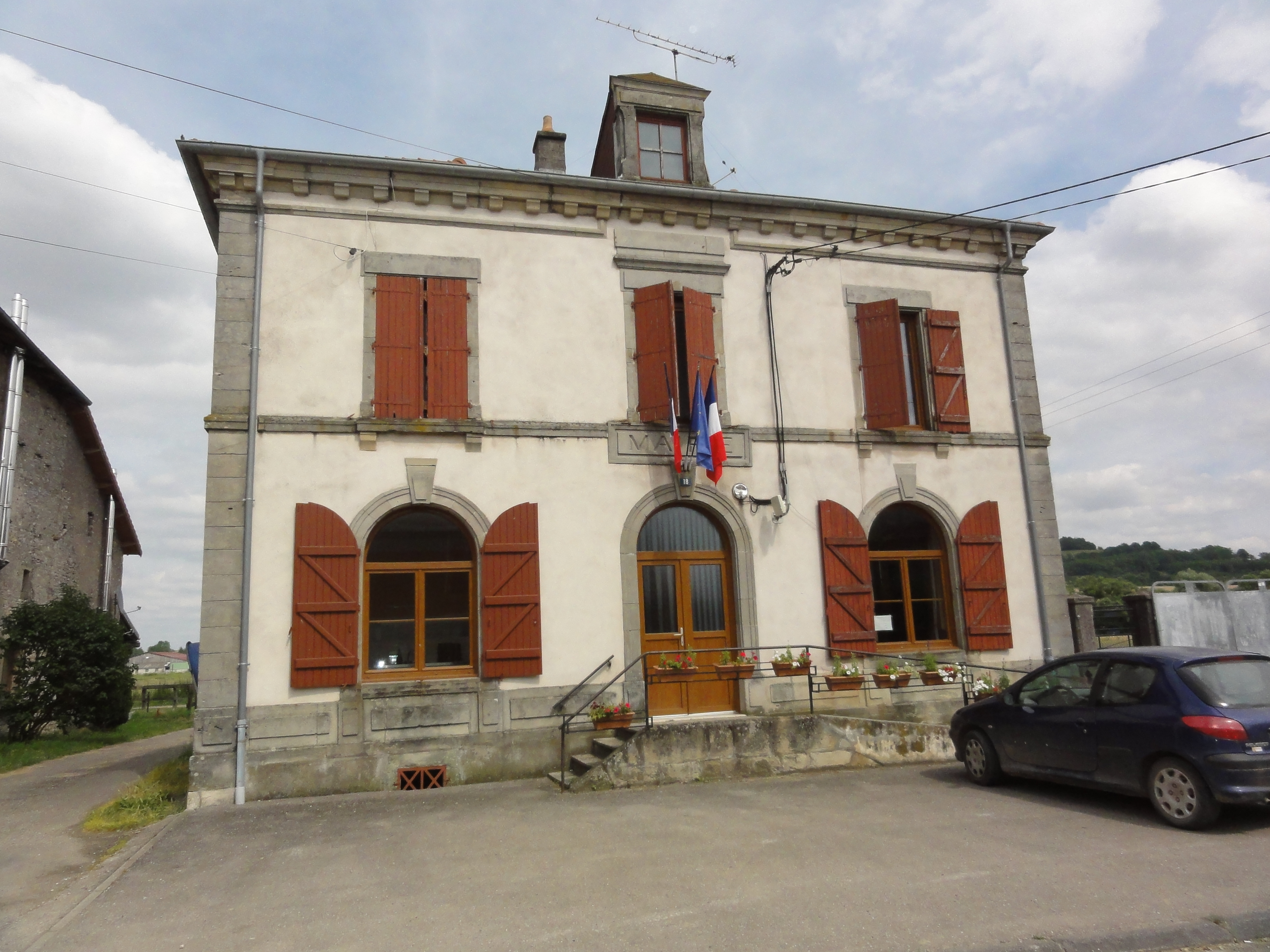
- The town hall in Saint-Boingt

- Coat of arms
- Location of Saint-Boingt
- Location within France Location within Grand Est
- Coordinates: 48°25′52″N 6°26′18″E
- Country: France
- Region: Grand Est
- Department: Meurthe-et-Moselle
- Arrondissement: Lunéville
- Canton: Lunéville-2
- Intercommunality: Meurthe, Mortagne, Moselle

Government
  - Mayor (2020–2026): Aurélie Thomas
- Area^{1}: 8.14 km^{2} (3.14 sq mi)
- Elevation: 275 m (902 ft)
- Highest elevation: 345 m (1,132 ft)
- Lowest elevation: 267 m (876 ft)
- Population (2023): 76
  - Density: 9.3/km^{2} (24/sq mi)
- Time zone: UTC+01:00 (CET)
  - Summer (DST): UTC+02:00 (CEST)
- INSEE/Postal code: 54471 /54290
- ^{1} French Land Register data, which excludes lakes, ponds, glaciers > 1 km^{2} (0.386 sq mi or 247 acres) and river estuaries.

Saint-Boingt (French pronunciation: [sɛ̃ bwɛ̃]) is a commune in the Meurthe-et-Moselle department in north-eastern France.

== See also ==
- Communes of the Meurthe-et-Moselle department
