= Seranville =

- Commune
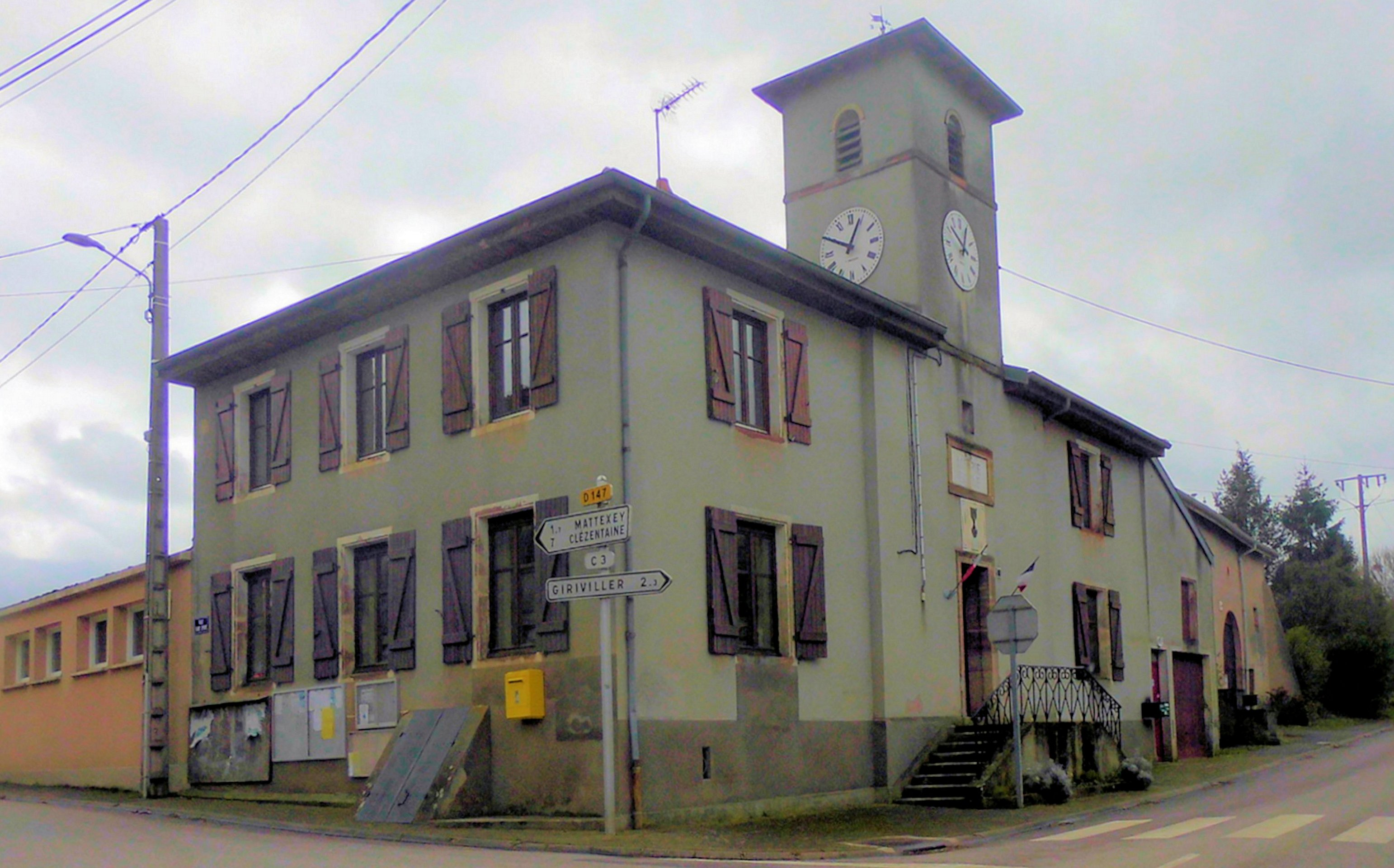
- The town hall and school in Seranville

- Coat of arms
- Location of Seranville
- Location within France Location within Grand Est
- Coordinates: 48°27′30″N 6°31′03″E
- Country: France
- Region: Grand Est
- Department: Meurthe-et-Moselle
- Arrondissement: Lunéville
- Canton: Lunéville-2
- Intercommunality: Meurthe, Mortagne, Moselle

Government
  - Mayor (2022–2026): Bertrand Simonin
- Area^{1}: 5.37 km^{2} (2.07 sq mi)
- Elevation: 300 m (980 ft)
- Highest elevation: 338 m (1,109 ft)
- Lowest elevation: 270 m (890 ft)
- Population (2023): 102
  - Density: 19.0/km^{2} (49.2/sq mi)
- Time zone: UTC+01:00 (CET)
  - Summer (DST): UTC+02:00 (CEST)
- INSEE/Postal code: 54501 /54830
- ^{1} French Land Register data, which excludes lakes, ponds, glaciers > 1 km^{2} (0.386 sq mi or 247 acres) and river estuaries.

Seranville (French pronunciation: [səʁɑ̃vil]) is a commune in the Meurthe-et-Moselle department in north-eastern France.

== Population ==
Historical population
| Year | Pop. | ±% p.a. |
|---|---|---|
| 1968 | 79 | — |
| 1975 | 74 | −0.93% |
| 1982 | 77 | +0.57% |
| 1990 | 75 | −0.33% |
| 1999 | 91 | +2.17% |
| 2007 | 99 | +1.06% |
| 2012 | 96 | −0.61% |
| 2017 | 100 | +0.82% |
| 2023 | 102 | +0.33% |
Source: INSEE

== See also ==
- Communes of the Meurthe-et-Moselle department
