= Canton of Lunéville-2 =

Canton in Grand Est, France

Coordinates: 48.58°N 6.50°E

The canton of Lunéville-2 is an administrative division of the Meurthe-et-Moselle department, northeastern France. It was created at the French canton reorganisation which came into effect in March 2015. Its seat is in Lunéville.

It consists of the following communes:

1. Barbonville
2. Bayon
3. Blainville-sur-l'Eau
4. Borville
5. Brémoncourt
6. Chanteheux
7. Charmois
8. Clayeures
9. Damelevières
10. Domptail-en-l'Air
11. Einvaux
12. Essey-la-Côte
13. Ferrières
14. Fraimbois
15. Franconville
16. Froville
17. Gerbéviller
18. Giriviller
19. Haigneville
20. Haudonville
21. Haussonville
22. Hériménil
23. Lamath
24. Landécourt
25. Lorey
26. Loromontzey
27. Lunéville (partly)
28. Magnières
29. Mattexey
30. Méhoncourt
31. Moncel-lès-Lunéville
32. Mont-sur-Meurthe
33. Moriviller
34. Moyen
35. Rehainviller
36. Remenoville
37. Romain
38. Rosières-aux-Salines
39. Rozelieures
40. Saffais
41. Saint-Boingt
42. Saint-Germain
43. Saint-Mard
44. Saint-Rémy-aux-Bois
45. Seranville
46. Tonnoy
47. Vallois
48. Vathiménil
49. Velle-sur-Moselle
50. Vennezey
51. Vigneulles
52. Villacourt
53. Virecourt
54. Xermaménil
