= Lorey =

- Commune
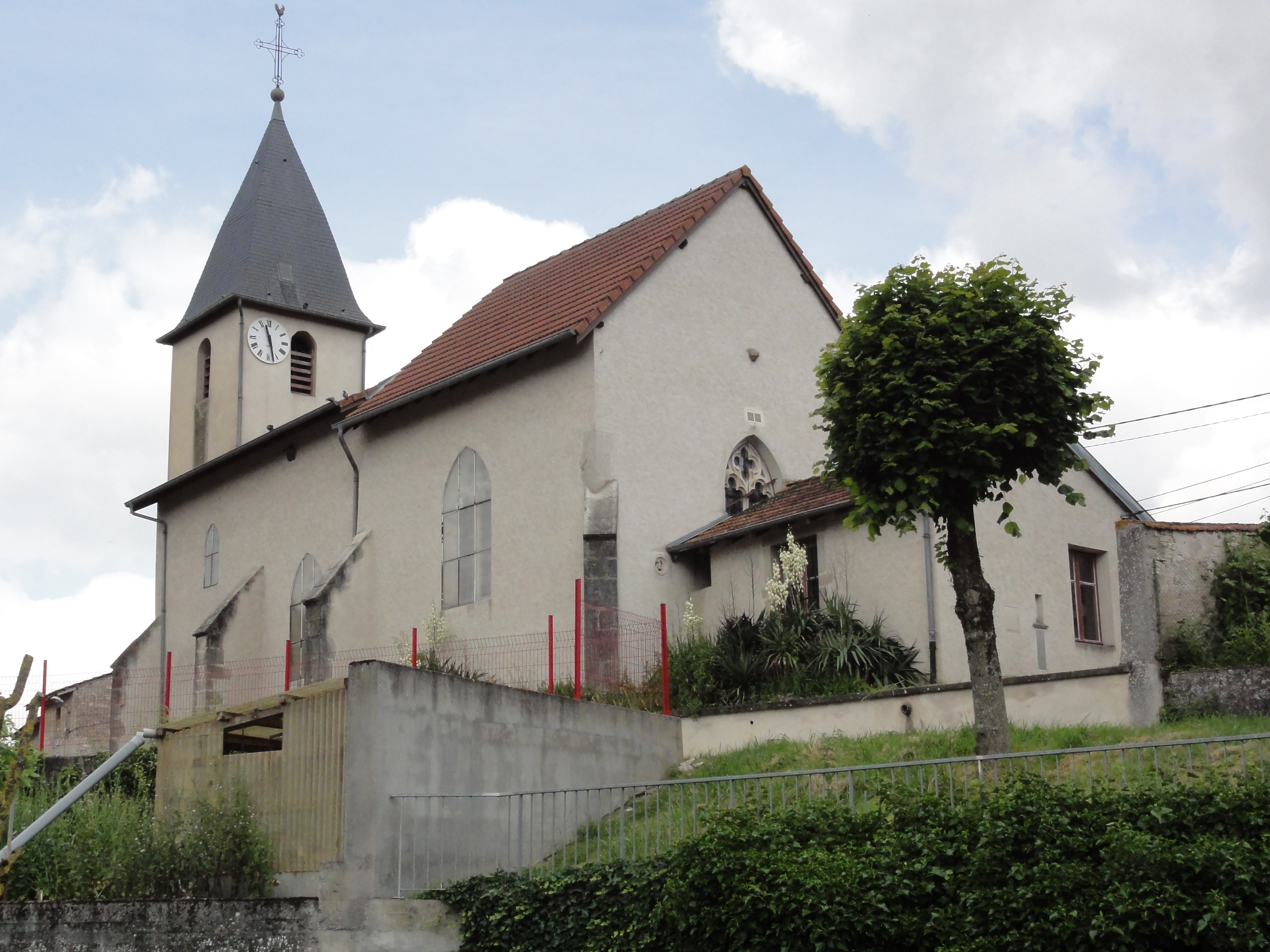
- The church in Lorey

- Coat of arms
- Location of Lorey
- Location within France Location within Grand Est
- Coordinates: 48°29′56″N 6°18′24″E
- Country: France
- Region: Grand Est
- Department: Meurthe-et-Moselle
- Arrondissement: Lunéville
- Canton: Lunéville-2
- Intercommunality: CC Meurthe, Mortagne, Moselle

Government
  - Mayor (2020–2026): Xavier Trevillot
- Area^{1}: 5.18 km^{2} (2.00 sq mi)
- Elevation: 220 m (720 ft)
- Highest elevation: 385 m (1,263 ft)
- Lowest elevation: 239 m (784 ft)
- Population (2023): 91
  - Density: 18/km^{2} (45/sq mi)
- Time zone: UTC+01:00 (CET)
  - Summer (DST): UTC+02:00 (CEST)
- INSEE/Postal code: 54324 /54290
- ^{1} French Land Register data, which excludes lakes, ponds, glaciers > 1 km^{2} (0.386 sq mi or 247 acres) and river estuaries.

Lorey (French pronunciation: [lɔʁɛ]) is a commune in the Meurthe-et-Moselle department in north-eastern France.

== See also ==
- Communes of the Meurthe-et-Moselle department
