= Loromontzey =

- Commune
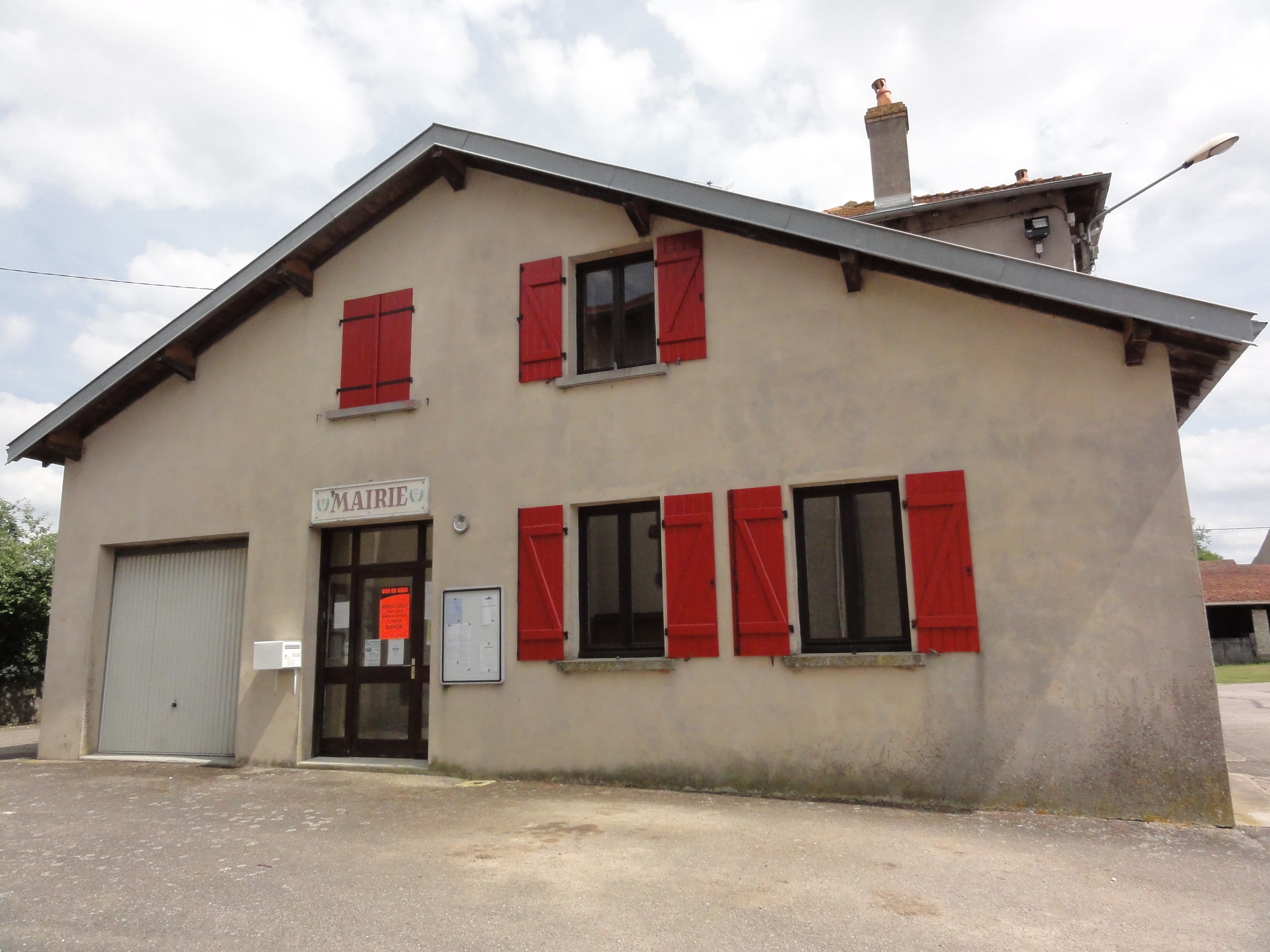
- The town hall in Loromontzey

- Coat of arms
- Location of Loromontzey
- Location within France Location within Grand Est
- Coordinates: 48°26′10″N 6°22′42″E
- Country: France
- Region: Grand Est
- Department: Meurthe-et-Moselle
- Arrondissement: Lunéville
- Canton: Lunéville-2
- Intercommunality: CC Meurthe, Mortagne, Moselle

Government
  - Mayor (2020–2026): Pascal Didier
- Area^{1}: 7.68 km^{2} (2.97 sq mi)
- Elevation: 260 m (850 ft)
- Highest elevation: 341 m (1,119 ft)
- Lowest elevation: 262 m (860 ft)
- Population (2023): 77
  - Density: 10/km^{2} (26/sq mi)
- Time zone: UTC+01:00 (CET)
  - Summer (DST): UTC+02:00 (CEST)
- INSEE/Postal code: 54325 /54290
- ^{1} French Land Register data, which excludes lakes, ponds, glaciers > 1 km^{2} (0.386 sq mi or 247 acres) and river estuaries.

Loromontzey is a commune in the Meurthe-et-Moselle department in north-eastern France.

== See also ==
- Communes of the Meurthe-et-Moselle department
