= Saint-Germain, Meurthe-et-Moselle =

Saint-Germain
- Commune
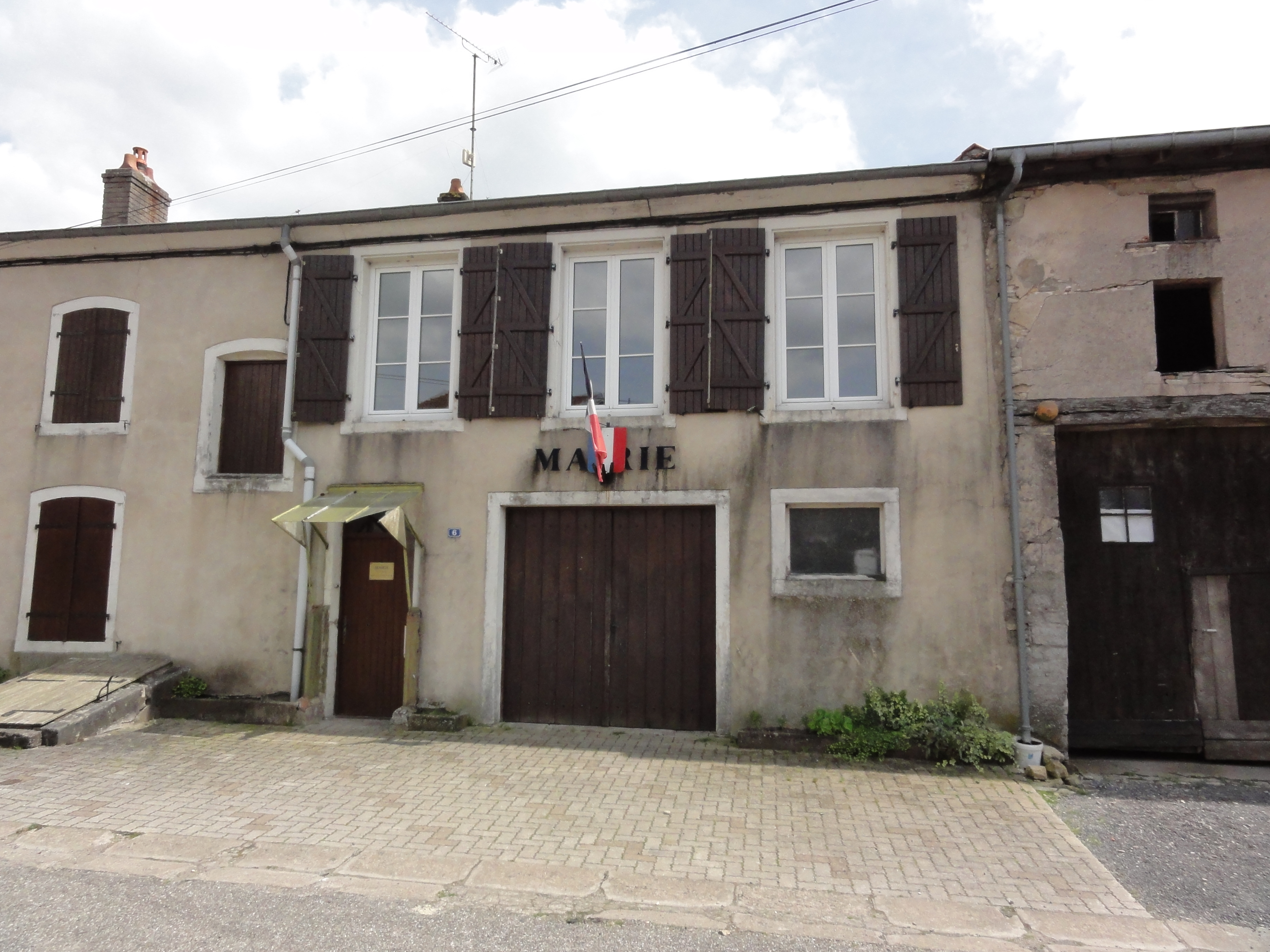
- The town hall in Saint-Germain

- Coat of arms
- Location of Saint-Germain
- Location within France Location within Grand Est
- Coordinates: 48°25′55″N 6°20′23″E
- Country: France
- Region: Grand Est
- Department: Meurthe-et-Moselle
- Arrondissement: Lunéville
- Canton: Lunéville-2

Government
  - Mayor (2020–2026): Christophe Mercier
- Area^{1}: 7.68 km^{2} (2.97 sq mi)
- Elevation: 360 m (1,180 ft)
- Highest elevation: 362 m (1,188 ft)
- Lowest elevation: 268 m (879 ft)
- Population (2023): 156
  - Density: 20.3/km^{2} (52.6/sq mi)
- Time zone: UTC+01:00 (CET)
  - Summer (DST): UTC+02:00 (CEST)
- INSEE/Postal code: 54475 /54290
- ^{1} French Land Register data, which excludes lakes, ponds, glaciers > 1 km^{2} (0.386 sq mi or 247 acres) and river estuaries.

Saint-Germain (French pronunciation: [sɛ̃ ʒɛʁmɛ̃]) is a commune in the Meurthe-et-Moselle department in north-eastern France.

== Population ==
Historical population
| Year | Pop. | ±% p.a. |
|---|---|---|
| 1968 | 124 | — |
| 1975 | 115 | −1.07% |
| 1982 | 116 | +0.12% |
| 1990 | 141 | +2.47% |
| 1999 | 146 | +0.39% |
| 2007 | 148 | +0.17% |
| 2012 | 155 | +0.93% |
| 2017 | 158 | +0.38% |
| 2023 | 156 | −0.21% |
Source: INSEE

== See also ==
- Communes of the Meurthe-et-Moselle department
