= Velle-sur-Moselle =

- Commune
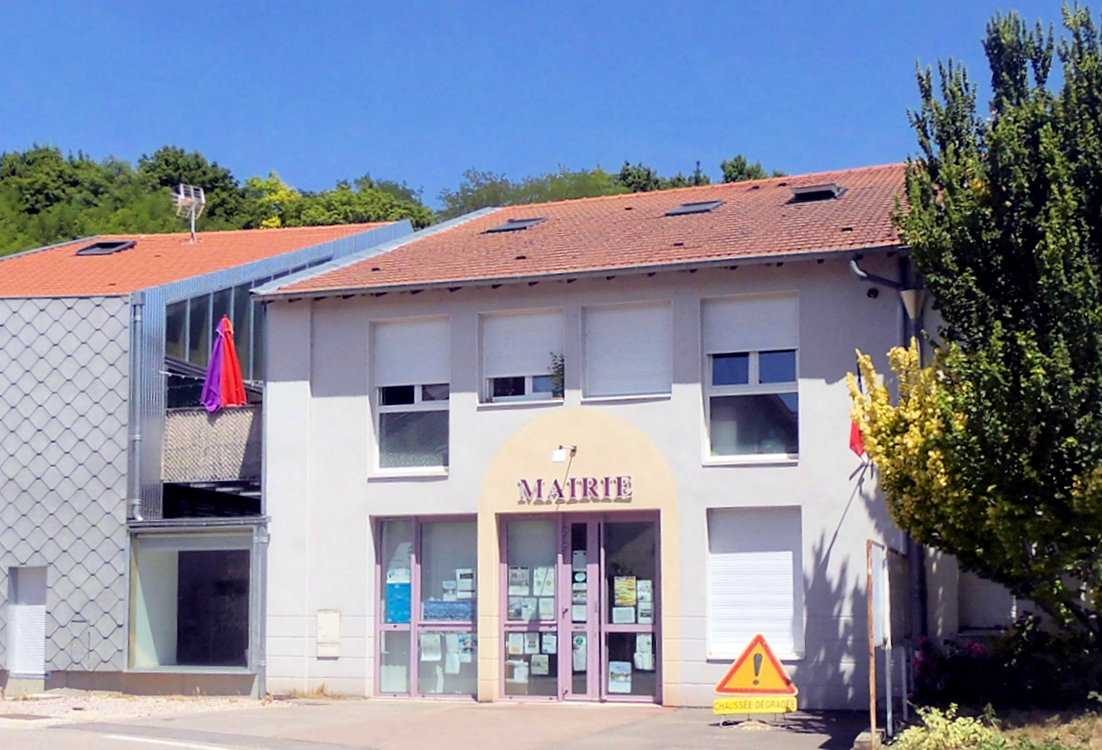
- The town hall in Velle-sur-Moselle

- Coat of arms
- Location of Velle-sur-Moselle
- Location within France Location within Grand Est
- Coordinates: 48°31′51″N 6°16′38″E
- Country: France
- Region: Grand Est
- Department: Meurthe-et-Moselle
- Arrondissement: Lunéville
- Canton: Lunéville-2
- Intercommunality: CC Meurthe, Mortagne, Moselle

Government
  - Mayor (2020–2026): Évelyne Mathis
- Area^{1}: 4.47 km^{2} (1.73 sq mi)
- Elevation: 235 m (771 ft)
- Highest elevation: 336 m (1,102 ft)
- Lowest elevation: 234 m (768 ft)
- Population (2023): 327
  - Density: 73.2/km^{2} (189/sq mi)
- Time zone: UTC+01:00 (CET)
  - Summer (DST): UTC+02:00 (CEST)
- INSEE/Postal code: 54559 /54290
- ^{1} French Land Register data, which excludes lakes, ponds, glaciers > 1 km^{2} (0.386 sq mi or 247 acres) and river estuaries.

Velle-sur-Moselle (French pronunciation: [vɛl syʁ mɔzɛl], literally Velle on Moselle) is a commune in the Meurthe-et-Moselle department in north-eastern France.

== See also ==
- Communes of the Meurthe-et-Moselle department
