= Saint-Rémy-aux-Bois =

- Commune
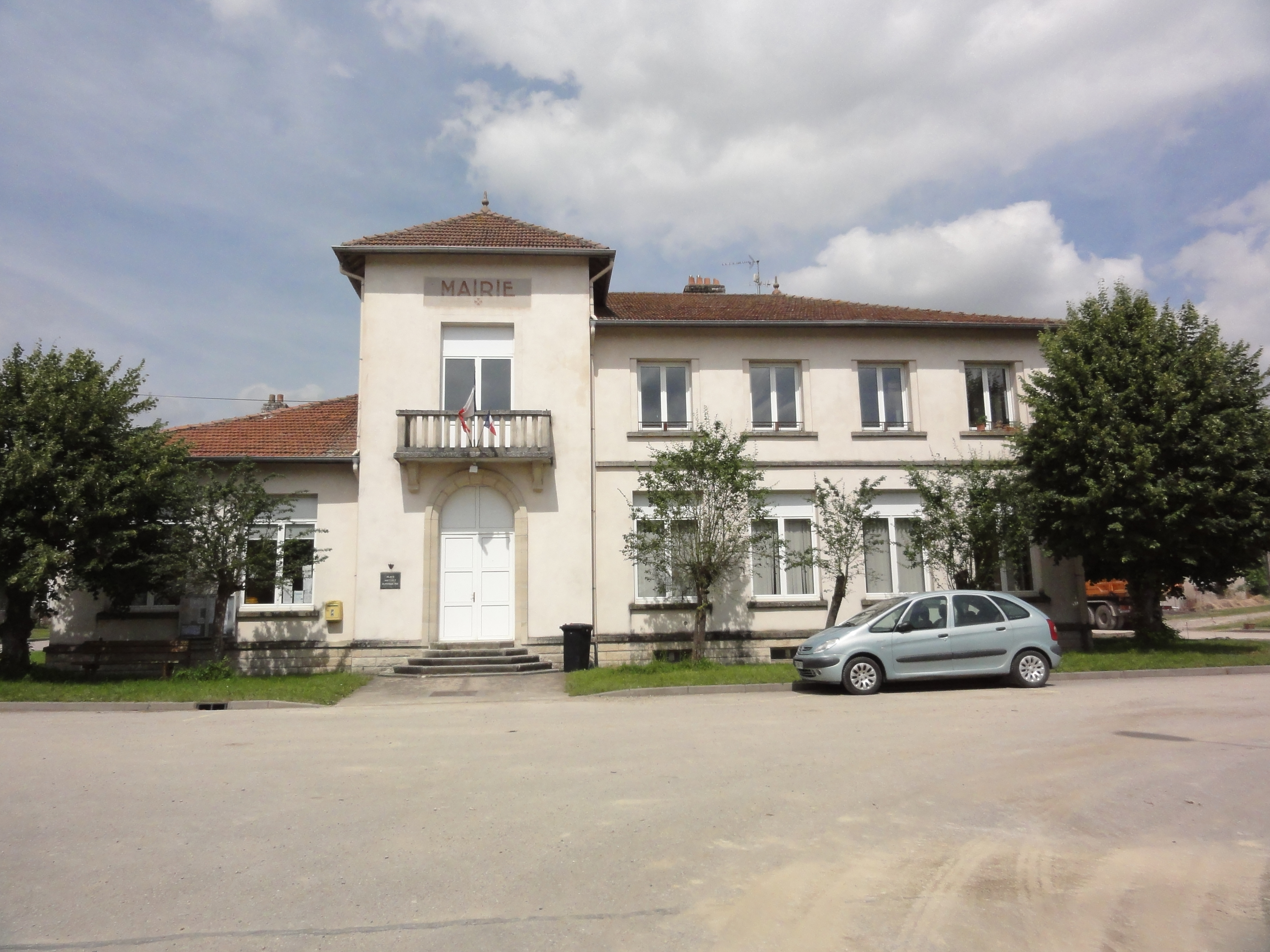
- The town hall in Saint-Rémy-aux-Bois

- Coat of arms
- Location of Saint-Rémy-aux-Bois
- Location within France Location within Grand Est
- Coordinates: 48°25′00″N 6°23′37″E
- Country: France
- Region: Grand Est
- Department: Meurthe-et-Moselle
- Arrondissement: Lunéville
- Canton: Lunéville-2

Government
  - Mayor (2020–2026): André Vigneron
- Area^{1}: 9.76 km^{2} (3.77 sq mi)
- Elevation: 280 m (920 ft)
- Highest elevation: 341 m (1,119 ft)
- Lowest elevation: 263 m (863 ft)
- Population (2023): 66
  - Density: 6.8/km^{2} (18/sq mi)
- Time zone: UTC+01:00 (CET)
  - Summer (DST): UTC+02:00 (CEST)
- INSEE/Postal code: 54487 /54290
- ^{1} French Land Register data, which excludes lakes, ponds, glaciers > 1 km^{2} (0.386 sq mi or 247 acres) and river estuaries.

Saint-Rémy-aux-Bois (French pronunciation: [sɛ̃ ʁemi o bwa]) is a commune in the Meurthe-et-Moselle department in north-eastern France.

== See also ==
- Communes of the Meurthe-et-Moselle department
