= Saint-Mard, Meurthe-et-Moselle =

Saint-Mard
- Commune
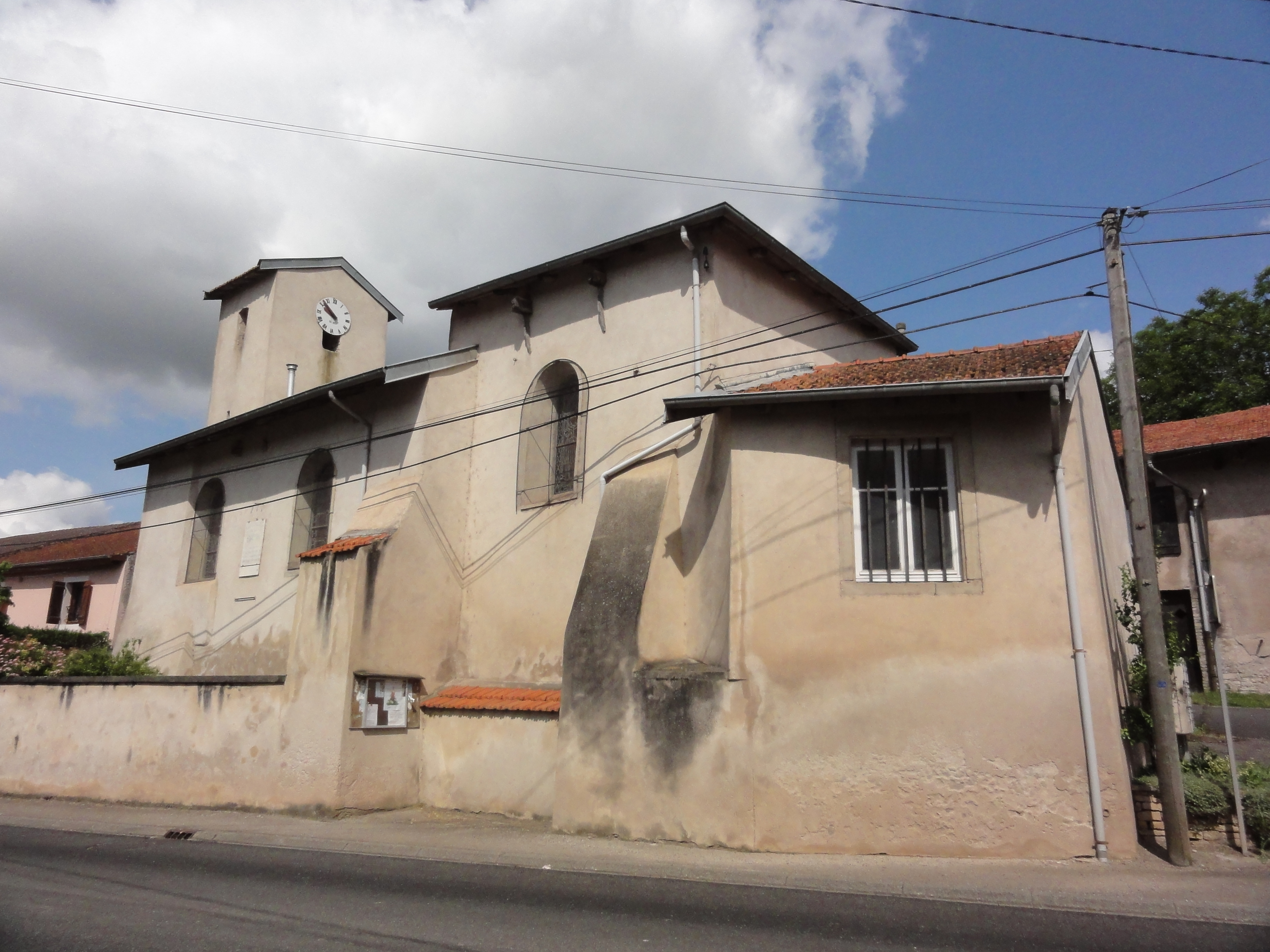
- The church in Saint-Mard

- Coat of arms
- Location of Saint-Mard
- Location within France Location within Grand Est
- Coordinates: 48°30′23″N 6°18′23″E
- Country: France
- Region: Grand Est
- Department: Meurthe-et-Moselle
- Arrondissement: Lunéville
- Canton: Lunéville-2
- Intercommunality: Meurthe, Mortagne, Moselle

Government
  - Mayor (2020–2026): Daniel Barthélémy
- Area^{1}: 2.95 km^{2} (1.14 sq mi)
- Elevation: 250 m (820 ft)
- Highest elevation: 346 m (1,135 ft)
- Lowest elevation: 237 m (778 ft)
- Population (2023): 104
  - Density: 35.3/km^{2} (91.3/sq mi)
- Time zone: UTC+01:00 (CET)
  - Summer (DST): UTC+02:00 (CEST)
- INSEE/Postal code: 54479 /54290
- ^{1} French Land Register data, which excludes lakes, ponds, glaciers > 1 km^{2} (0.386 sq mi or 247 acres) and river estuaries.

Saint-Mard (French pronunciation: [sɛ̃ maʁ]) is a commune in the Meurthe-et-Moselle department in north-eastern France.

== See also ==
- Communes of the Meurthe-et-Moselle department
