= Rehainviller =

- Commune
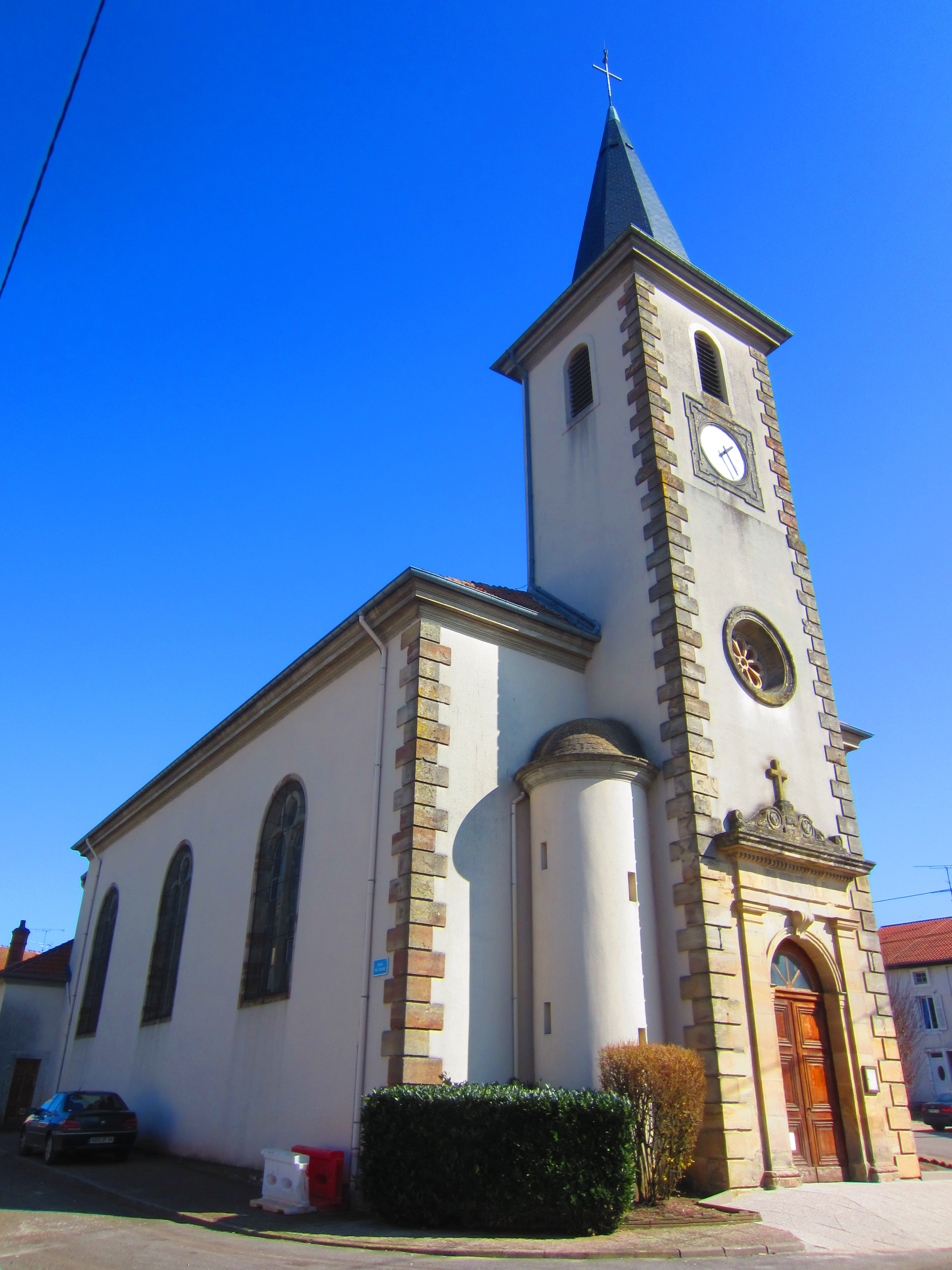
- The church in Rehainviller

- Coat of arms
- Location of Rehainviller
- Location within France Location within Grand Est
- Coordinates: 48°33′42″N 6°28′11″E
- Country: France
- Region: Grand Est
- Department: Meurthe-et-Moselle
- Arrondissement: Lunéville
- Canton: Lunéville-2
- Intercommunality: CC Territoire de Lunéville à Baccarat

Government
  - Mayor (2024–2026): Malik Boulefrakh
- Area^{1}: 5.64 km^{2} (2.18 sq mi)
- Elevation: 230 m (750 ft)
- Highest elevation: 273 m (896 ft)
- Lowest elevation: 217 m (712 ft)
- Population (2023): 1,057
  - Density: 187/km^{2} (485/sq mi)
- Time zone: UTC+01:00 (CET)
  - Summer (DST): UTC+02:00 (CEST)
- INSEE/Postal code: 54449 /54300
- ^{1} French Land Register data, which excludes lakes, ponds, glaciers > 1 km^{2} (0.386 sq mi or 247 acres) and river estuaries.

Rehainviller is a commune in the Meurthe-et-Moselle department in north-eastern France.

== See also ==
- Communes of the Meurthe-et-Moselle department
