= Essey-la-Côte =

- Commune
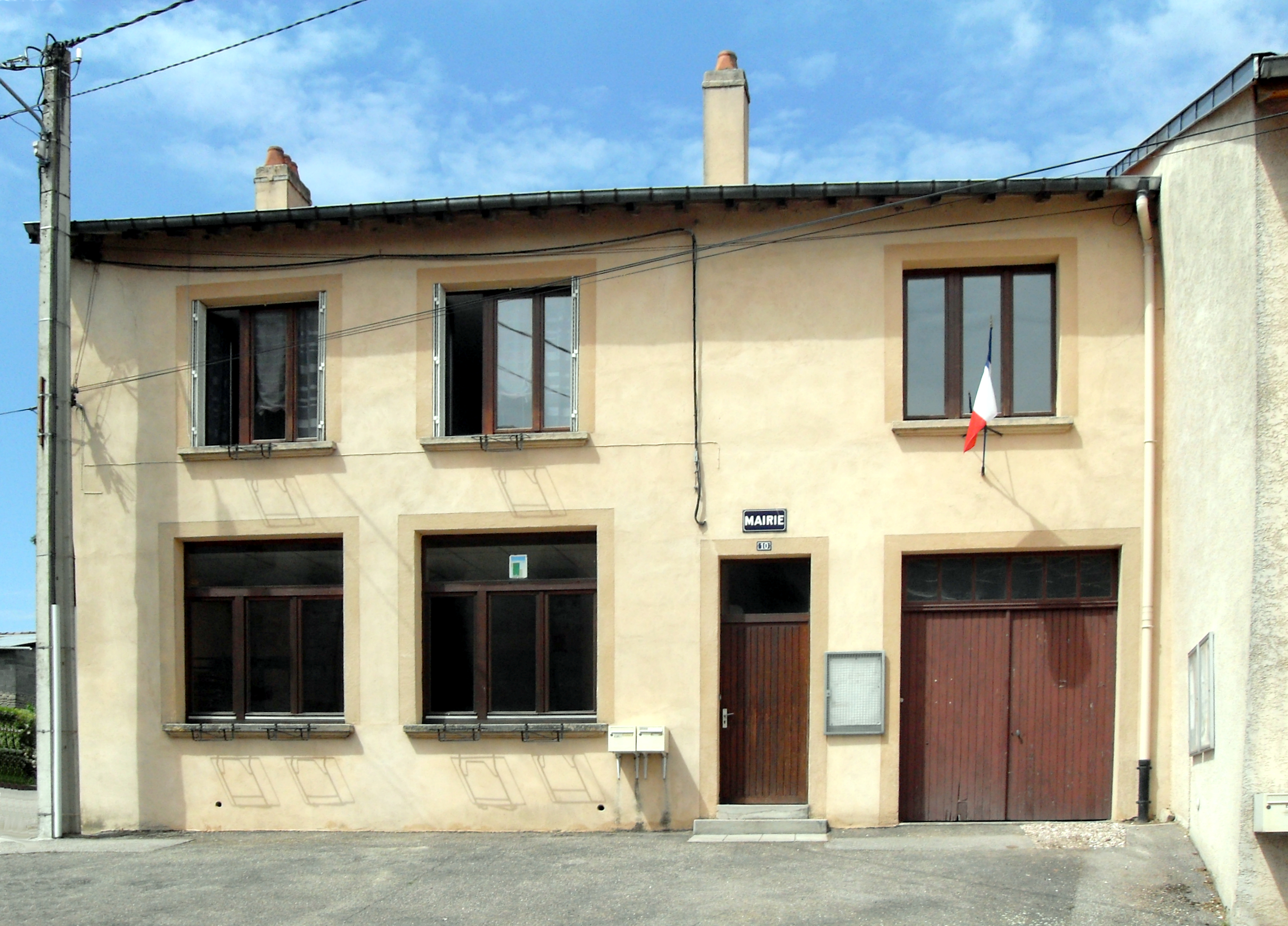
- The town hall in Essey-la-Côte

- Coat of arms
- Location of Essey-la-Côte
- Location within France Location within Grand Est
- Coordinates: 48°25′30″N 6°28′07″E
- Country: France
- Region: Grand Est
- Department: Meurthe-et-Moselle
- Arrondissement: Lunéville
- Canton: Lunéville-2
- Intercommunality: Meurthe, Mortagne, Moselle

Government
  - Mayor (2020–2026): Denis Ferry
- Area^{1}: 6.6 km^{2} (2.5 sq mi)
- Elevation: 330 m (1,080 ft)
- Highest elevation: 415 m (1,362 ft)
- Lowest elevation: 280 m (920 ft)
- Population (2023): 76
  - Density: 12/km^{2} (30/sq mi)
- Time zone: UTC+01:00 (CET)
  - Summer (DST): UTC+02:00 (CEST)
- INSEE/Postal code: 54183 /54830
- ^{1} French Land Register data, which excludes lakes, ponds, glaciers > 1 km^{2} (0.386 sq mi or 247 acres) and river estuaries.

Essey-la-Côte (French pronunciation: [esɛ la kot]) is a commune in the Meurthe-et-Moselle department in north-eastern France.

== See also ==
- Communes of the Meurthe-et-Moselle department
