= Domptail-en-l'Air =

- Commune
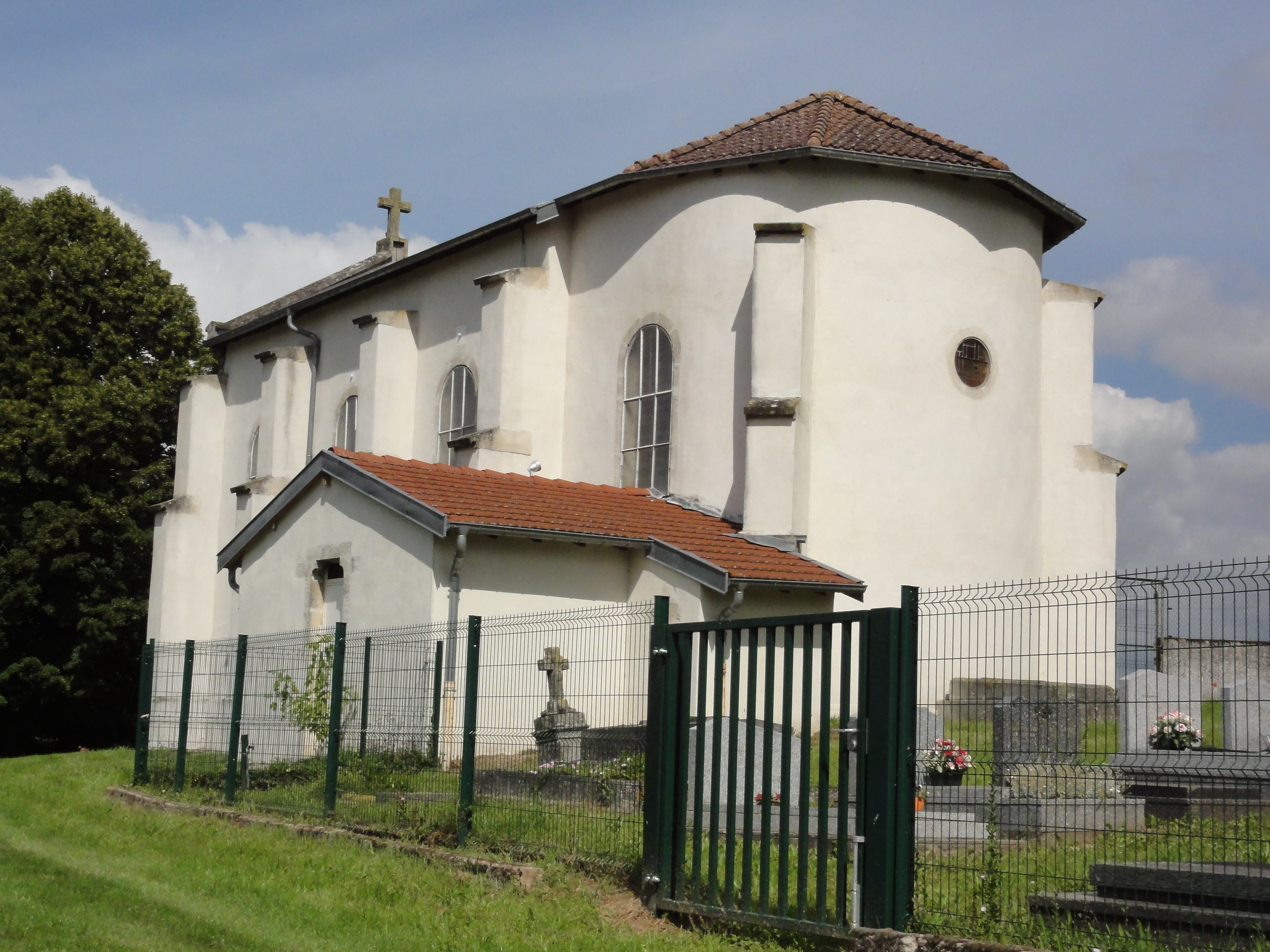
- The church in Domptail-en-l'Air

- Coat of arms
- Location of Domptail-en-l'Air
- Location within France Location within Grand Est
- Coordinates: 48°30′54″N 6°19′41″E
- Country: France
- Region: Grand Est
- Department: Meurthe-et-Moselle
- Arrondissement: Lunéville
- Canton: Lunéville-2
- Intercommunality: CC Meurthe, Mortagne, Moselle

Government
  - Mayor (2020–2026): Marie-Christine Albrecht
- Area^{1}: 3.13 km^{2} (1.21 sq mi)
- Elevation: 300 m (980 ft)
- Highest elevation: 401 m (1,316 ft)
- Lowest elevation: 249 m (817 ft)
- Population (2023): 69
  - Density: 22/km^{2} (57/sq mi)
- Time zone: UTC+01:00 (CET)
  - Summer (DST): UTC+02:00 (CEST)
- INSEE/Postal code: 54170 /54290
- ^{1} French Land Register data, which excludes lakes, ponds, glaciers > 1 km^{2} (0.386 sq mi or 247 acres) and river estuaries.

Domptail-en-l'Air is a commune in the Meurthe-et-Moselle department in north-eastern France.

== See also ==
- Communes of the Meurthe-et-Moselle department
