= Mattexey =

- Commune
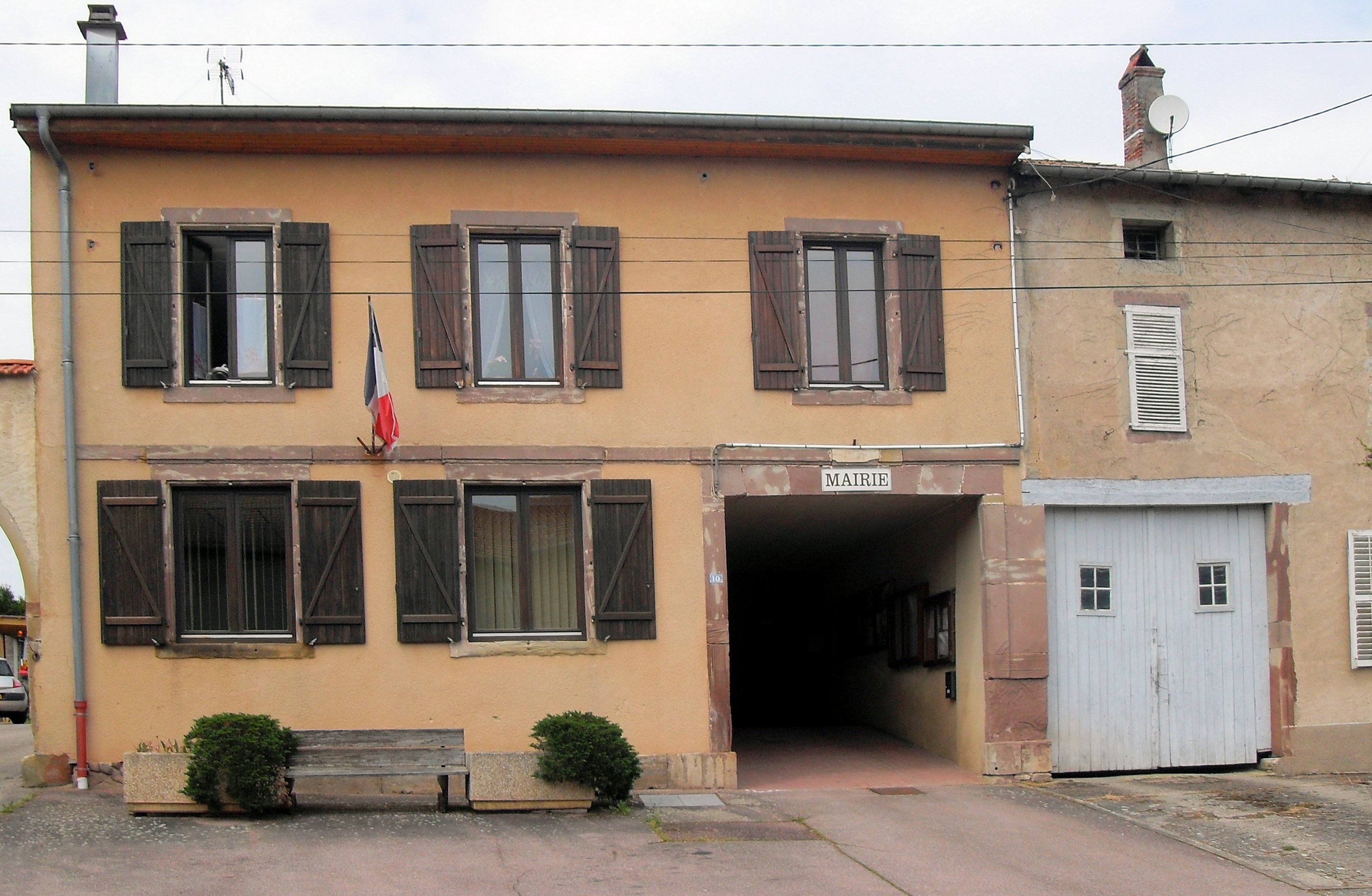
- The town hall in Mattexey

- Coat of arms
- Location of Mattexey
- Location within France Location within Grand Est
- Coordinates: 48°26′40″N 6°31′01″E
- Country: France
- Region: Grand Est
- Department: Meurthe-et-Moselle
- Arrondissement: Lunéville
- Canton: Lunéville-2
- Intercommunality: Meurthe, Mortagne, Moselle

Government
  - Mayor (2020–2026): Remi Vuillaume
- Area^{1}: 4.97 km^{2} (1.92 sq mi)
- Elevation: 290 m (950 ft)
- Highest elevation: 337 m (1,106 ft)
- Lowest elevation: 270 m (890 ft)
- Population (2023): 62
  - Density: 12/km^{2} (32/sq mi)
- Time zone: UTC+01:00 (CET)
  - Summer (DST): UTC+02:00 (CEST)
- INSEE/Postal code: 54356 /54830
- ^{1} French Land Register data, which excludes lakes, ponds, glaciers > 1 km^{2} (0.386 sq mi or 247 acres) and river estuaries.

Mattexey is a commune in the Meurthe-et-Moselle département in north-eastern France.

== See also ==
- Communes of the Meurthe-et-Moselle department
