= Romain, Meurthe-et-Moselle =

Romain
- Commune
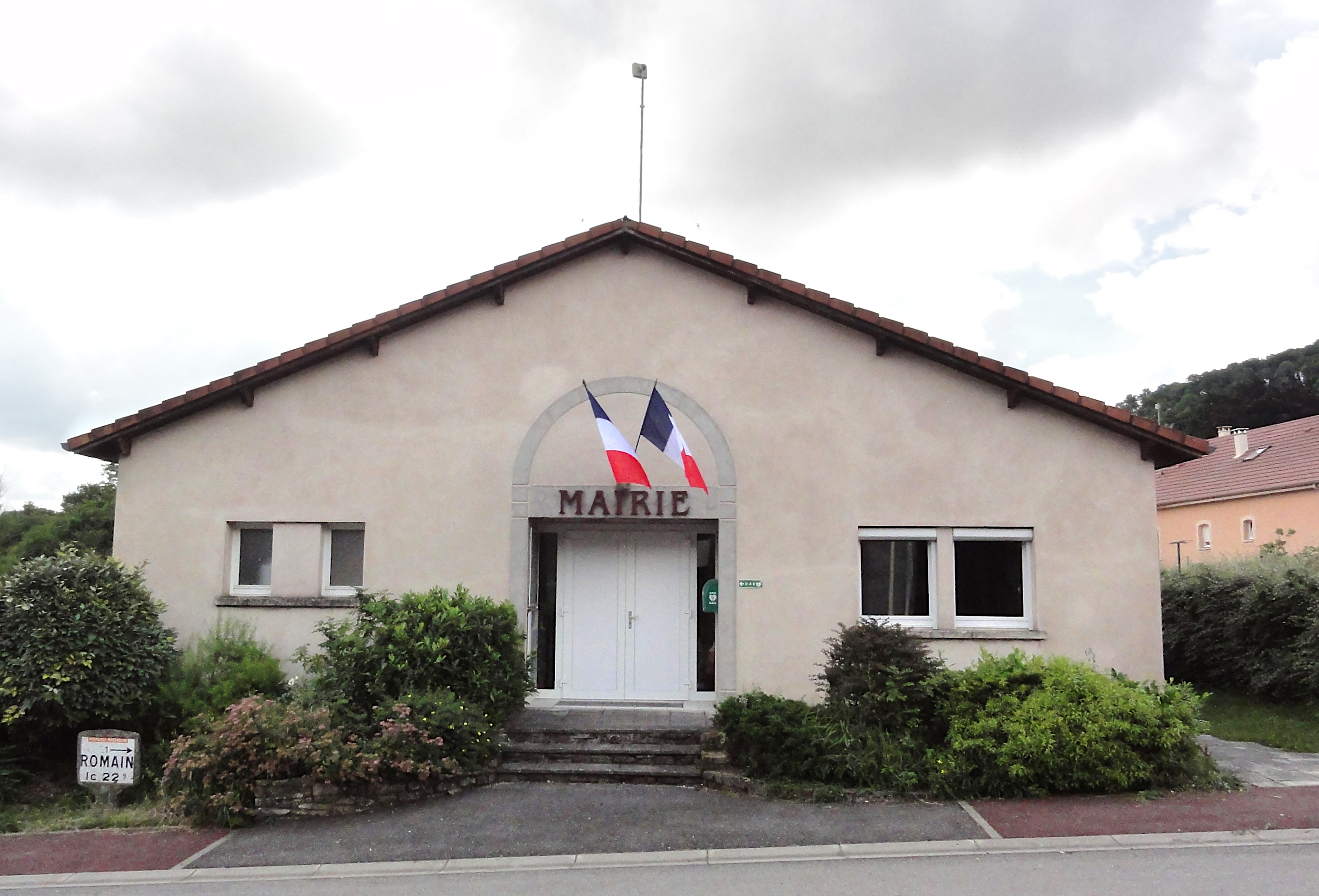
- The town hall in Romain

- Coat of arms
- Location of Romain
- Location within France Location within Grand Est
- Coordinates: 48°31′01″N 6°21′35″E
- Country: France
- Region: Grand Est
- Department: Meurthe-et-Moselle
- Arrondissement: Lunéville
- Canton: Lunéville-2
- Intercommunality: CC Meurthe, Mortagne, Moselle

Government
  - Mayor (2020–2026): Linda Kwiecien
- Area^{1}: 3.15 km^{2} (1.22 sq mi)
- Elevation: 300 m (980 ft)
- Highest elevation: 355 m (1,165 ft)
- Lowest elevation: 260 m (850 ft)
- Population (2023): 69
  - Density: 22/km^{2} (57/sq mi)
- Time zone: UTC+01:00 (CET)
  - Summer (DST): UTC+02:00 (CEST)
- INSEE/Postal code: 54461 /54360
- ^{1} French Land Register data, which excludes lakes, ponds, glaciers > 1 km^{2} (0.386 sq mi or 247 acres) and river estuaries.

Romain (French pronunciation: [ʁɔmɛ̃]) is a commune in the Meurthe-et-Moselle department in north-eastern France.

== See also ==
- Communes of the Meurthe-et-Moselle department
