= Einvaux =

- Commune
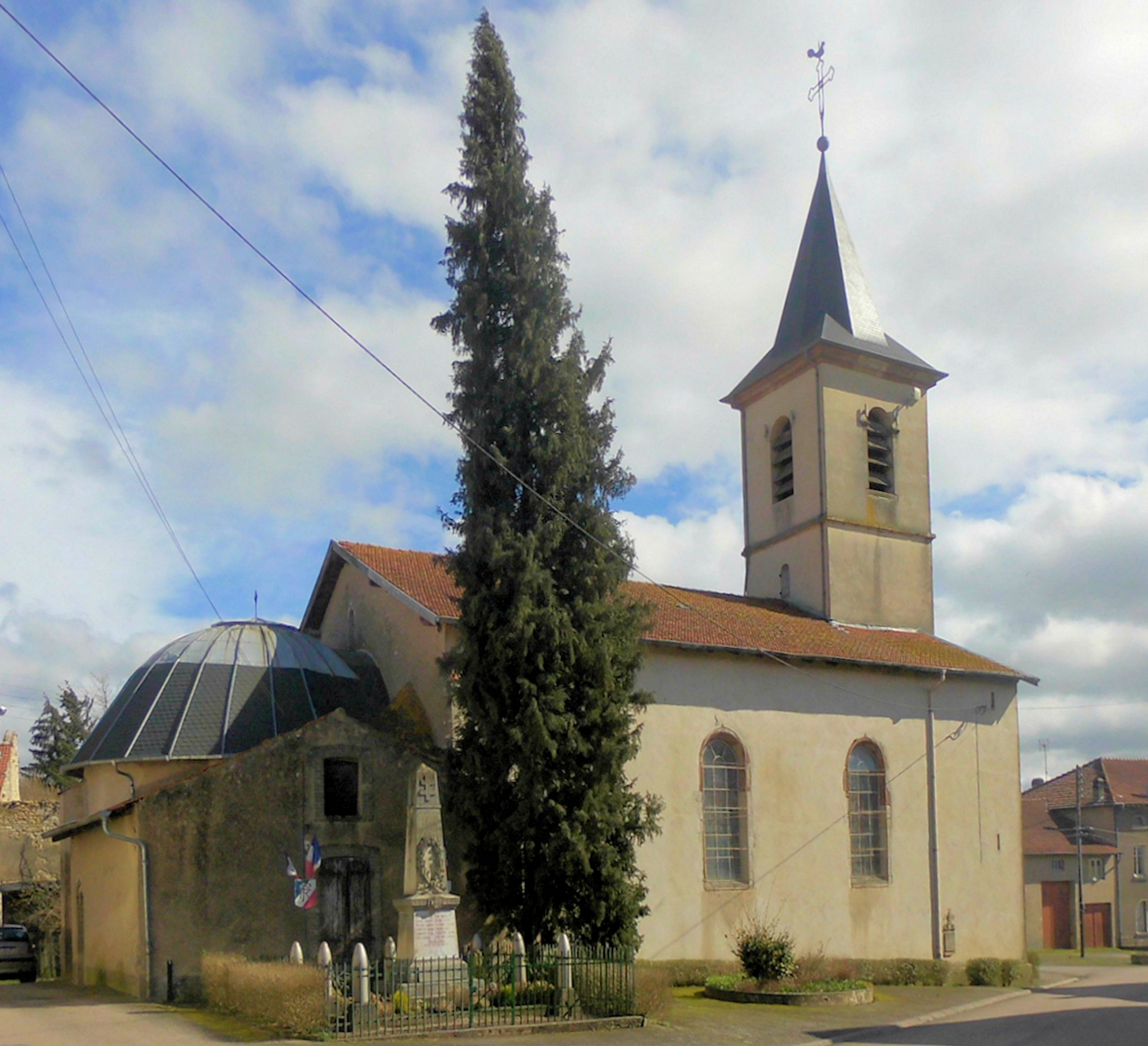
- The church in Einvaux

- Coat of arms
- Location of Einvaux
- Location within France Location within Grand Est
- Coordinates: 48°29′26″N 6°23′50″E
- Country: France
- Region: Grand Est
- Department: Meurthe-et-Moselle
- Arrondissement: Lunéville
- Canton: Lunéville-2
- Intercommunality: CC Meurthe, Mortagne, Moselle

Government
  - Mayor (2020–2026): Renaud Noël
- Area^{1}: 7.38 km^{2} (2.85 sq mi)
- Elevation: 288 m (945 ft)
- Highest elevation: 348 m (1,142 ft)
- Lowest elevation: 255 m (837 ft)
- Population (2023): 338
  - Density: 45.8/km^{2} (119/sq mi)
- Time zone: UTC+01:00 (CET)
  - Summer (DST): UTC+02:00 (CEST)
- INSEE/Postal code: 54175 /54360
- ^{1} French Land Register data, which excludes lakes, ponds, glaciers > 1 km^{2} (0.386 sq mi or 247 acres) and river estuaries.

Einvaux (French pronunciation: [ɛ̃vo]) is a commune in the Meurthe-et-Moselle department in north-eastern France.

== See also ==
- Communes of the Meurthe-et-Moselle department
