= Remenoville =

- Commune
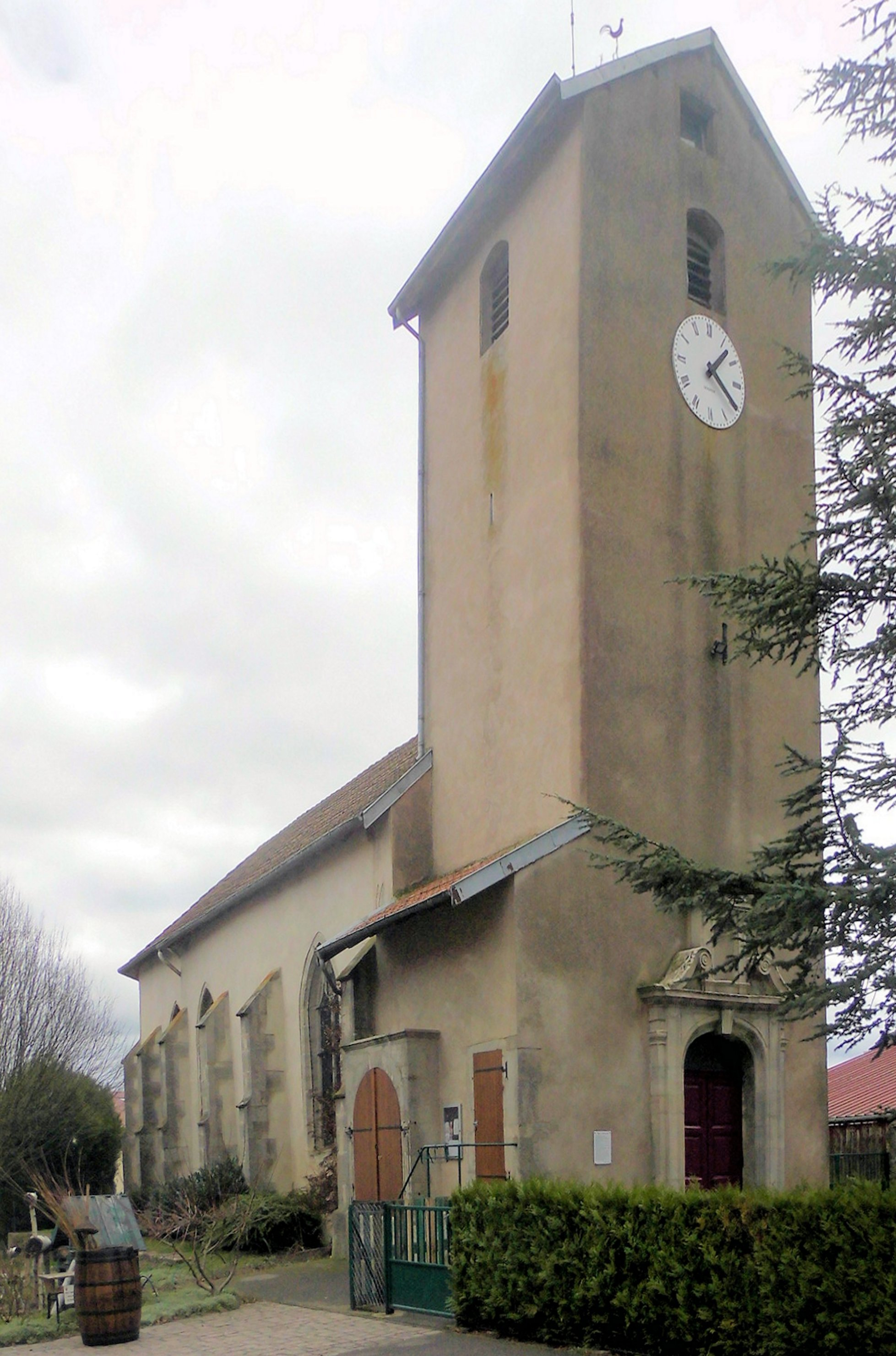
- The church in Remenoville
- Location of Remenoville
- Location within France Location within Grand Est
- Coordinates: 48°27′50″N 6°28′29″E
- Country: France
- Region: Grand Est
- Department: Meurthe-et-Moselle
- Arrondissement: Lunéville
- Canton: Lunéville-2
- Intercommunality: Meurthe, Mortagne, Moselle

Government
  - Mayor (2020–2026): Alain Bally
- Area^{1}: 8.46 km^{2} (3.27 sq mi)
- Elevation: 265 m (869 ft)
- Highest elevation: 363 m (1,191 ft)
- Lowest elevation: 249 m (817 ft)
- Population (2023): 157
  - Density: 18.6/km^{2} (48.1/sq mi)
- Time zone: UTC+01:00 (CET)
  - Summer (DST): UTC+02:00 (CEST)
- INSEE/Postal code: 54455 /54830
- ^{1} French Land Register data, which excludes lakes, ponds, glaciers > 1 km^{2} (0.386 sq mi or 247 acres) and river estuaries.

Remenoville (French pronunciation: [ʁəmnɔvil]) is a commune in the Meurthe-et-Moselle department in north-eastern France.

== See also ==
- Communes of the Meurthe-et-Moselle department
