= Fraimbois =

- Commune
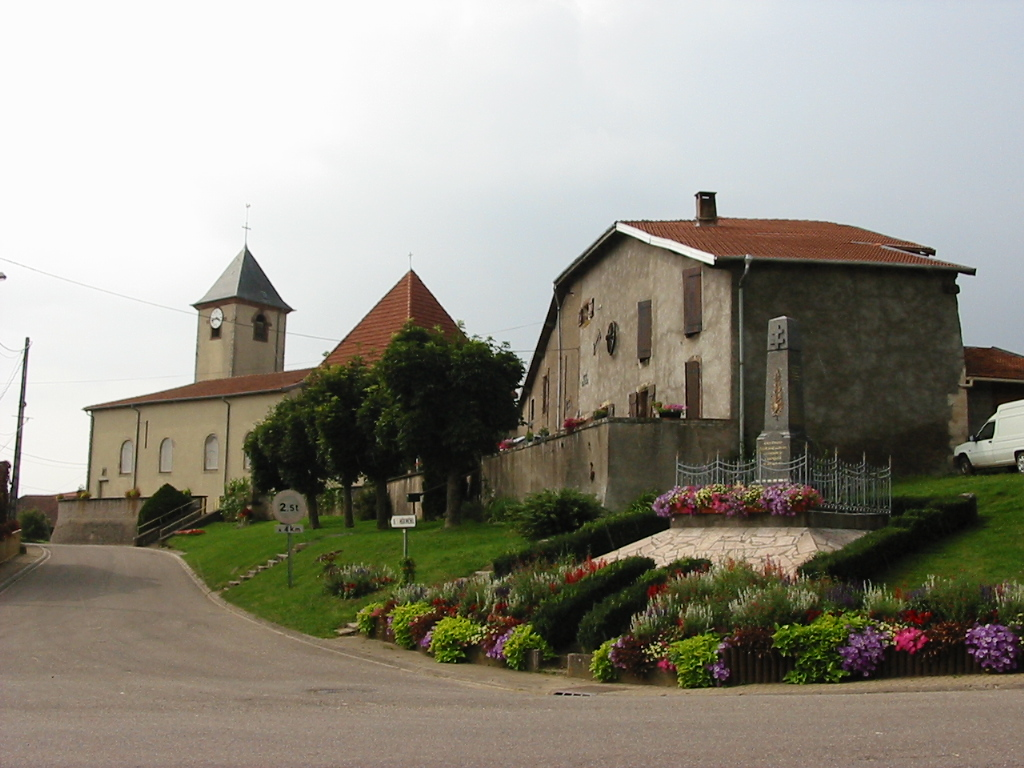
- The church in Fraimbois

- Coat of arms
- Location of Fraimbois
- Location within France Location within Grand Est
- Coordinates: 48°31′48″N 6°32′33″E
- Country: France
- Region: Grand Est
- Department: Meurthe-et-Moselle
- Arrondissement: Lunéville
- Canton: Lunéville-2
- Intercommunality: Territoire de Lunéville à Baccarat

Government
  - Mayor (2020–2026): François Genay
- Area^{1}: 15.02 km^{2} (5.80 sq mi)
- Elevation: 266 m (873 ft)
- Highest elevation: 293 m (961 ft)
- Lowest elevation: 231 m (758 ft)
- Population (2023): 348
  - Density: 23.2/km^{2} (60.0/sq mi)
- Time zone: UTC+01:00 (CET)
  - Summer (DST): UTC+02:00 (CEST)
- INSEE/Postal code: 54206 /54300
- ^{1} French Land Register data, which excludes lakes, ponds, glaciers > 1 km^{2} (0.386 sq mi or 247 acres) and river estuaries.

Fraimbois (French pronunciation: [fʁɛ̃bwa]) is a commune in the Meurthe-et-Moselle department in north-eastern France.

== See also ==
- Communes of the Meurthe-et-Moselle department
