= Borville =

- Commune
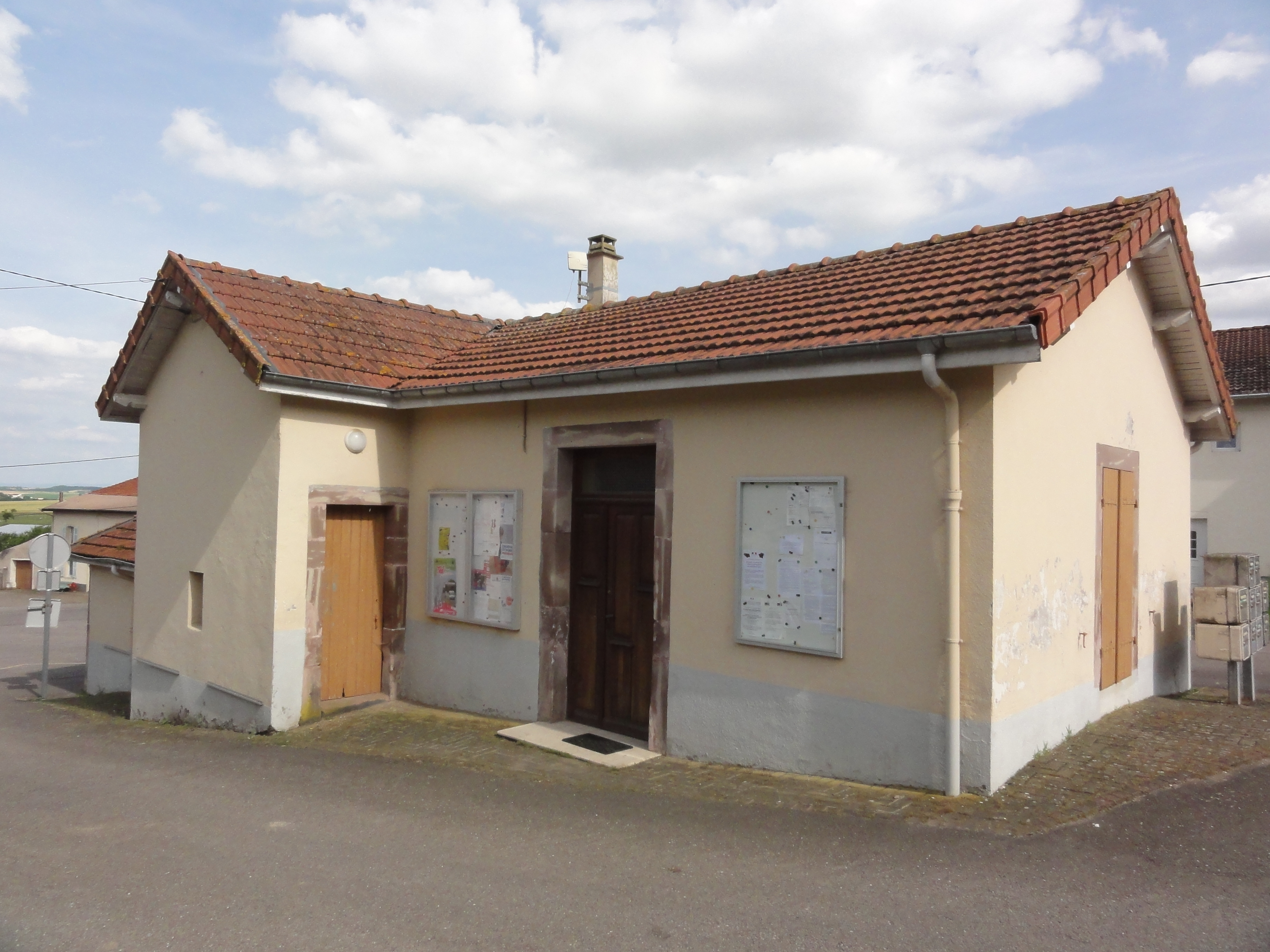
- The town hall in Borville

- Coat of arms
- Location of Borville
- Location within France Location within Grand Est
- Coordinates: 48°26′57″N 6°23′37″E
- Country: France
- Region: Grand Est
- Department: Meurthe-et-Moselle
- Arrondissement: Lunéville
- Canton: Lunéville-2
- Intercommunality: Meurthe, Mortagne, Moselle

Government
  - Mayor (2020–2026): Gérard Euriat
- Area^{1}: 4.71 km^{2} (1.82 sq mi)
- Elevation: 311 m (1,020 ft)
- Highest elevation: 342 m (1,122 ft)
- Lowest elevation: 262 m (860 ft)
- Population (2023): 83
  - Density: 18/km^{2} (46/sq mi)
- Time zone: UTC+01:00 (CET)
  - Summer (DST): UTC+02:00 (CEST)
- INSEE/Postal code: 54085 /54290
- ^{1} French Land Register data, which excludes lakes, ponds, glaciers > 1 km^{2} (0.386 sq mi or 247 acres) and river estuaries.

Borville is a commune in the Meurthe-et-Moselle department in northeastern France.

== Population ==
Historical population
Year	Pop.	±% p.a.
1968	99	—
1975	87	−1.83%
1982	75	−2.10%
1990	82	+1.12%
1999	75	−0.99%
2007	98	+3.40%
2012	94	−0.83%
2017	97	+0.63%
2023	83	−2.56%
Source: INSEE

== See also ==
- Communes of the Meurthe-et-Moselle department
