= Franconville, Meurthe-et-Moselle =

Franconville
- Commune
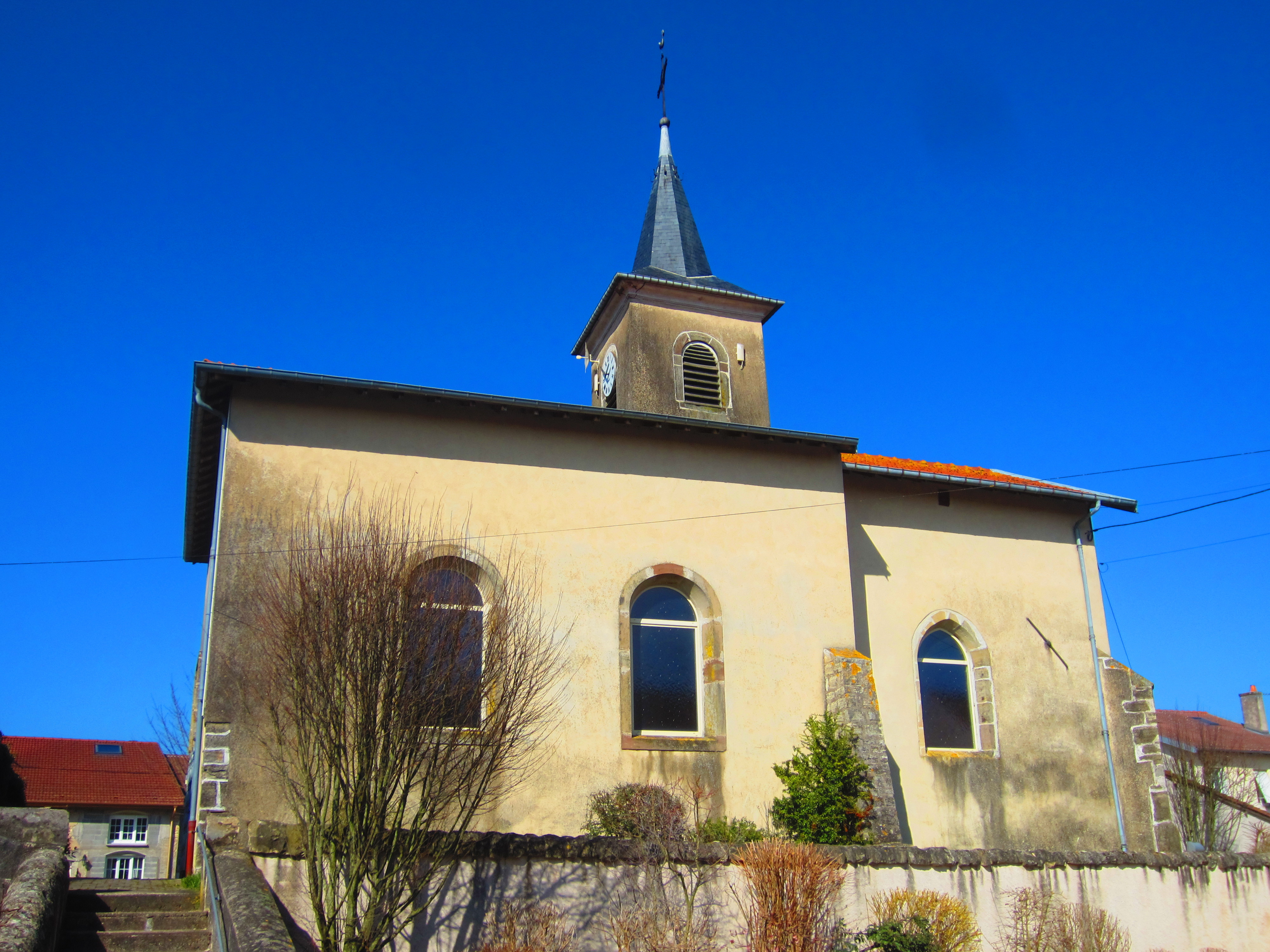
- The church in Franconville

- Coat of arms
- Location of Franconville
- Location within France Location within Grand Est
- Coordinates: 48°30′01″N 6°27′10″E
- Country: France
- Region: Grand Est
- Department: Meurthe-et-Moselle
- Arrondissement: Lunéville
- Canton: Lunéville-2
- Intercommunality: Territoire de Lunéville à Baccarat

Government
  - Mayor (2020–2026): Philippe Schaeffer
- Area^{1}: 4.56 km^{2} (1.76 sq mi)
- Elevation: 245 m (804 ft)
- Highest elevation: 282 m (925 ft)
- Lowest elevation: 234 m (768 ft)
- Population (2023): 63
  - Density: 14/km^{2} (36/sq mi)
- Time zone: UTC+01:00 (CET)
  - Summer (DST): UTC+02:00 (CEST)
- INSEE/Postal code: 54209 /54830
- ^{1} French Land Register data, which excludes lakes, ponds, glaciers > 1 km^{2} (0.386 sq mi or 247 acres) and river estuaries.

Franconville (French pronunciation: [fʁɑ̃kɔ̃vil]) is a commune in the Meurthe-et-Moselle department in north-eastern France.

== See also ==
- Communes of the Meurthe-et-Moselle department
