= Haussonville =

- Commune
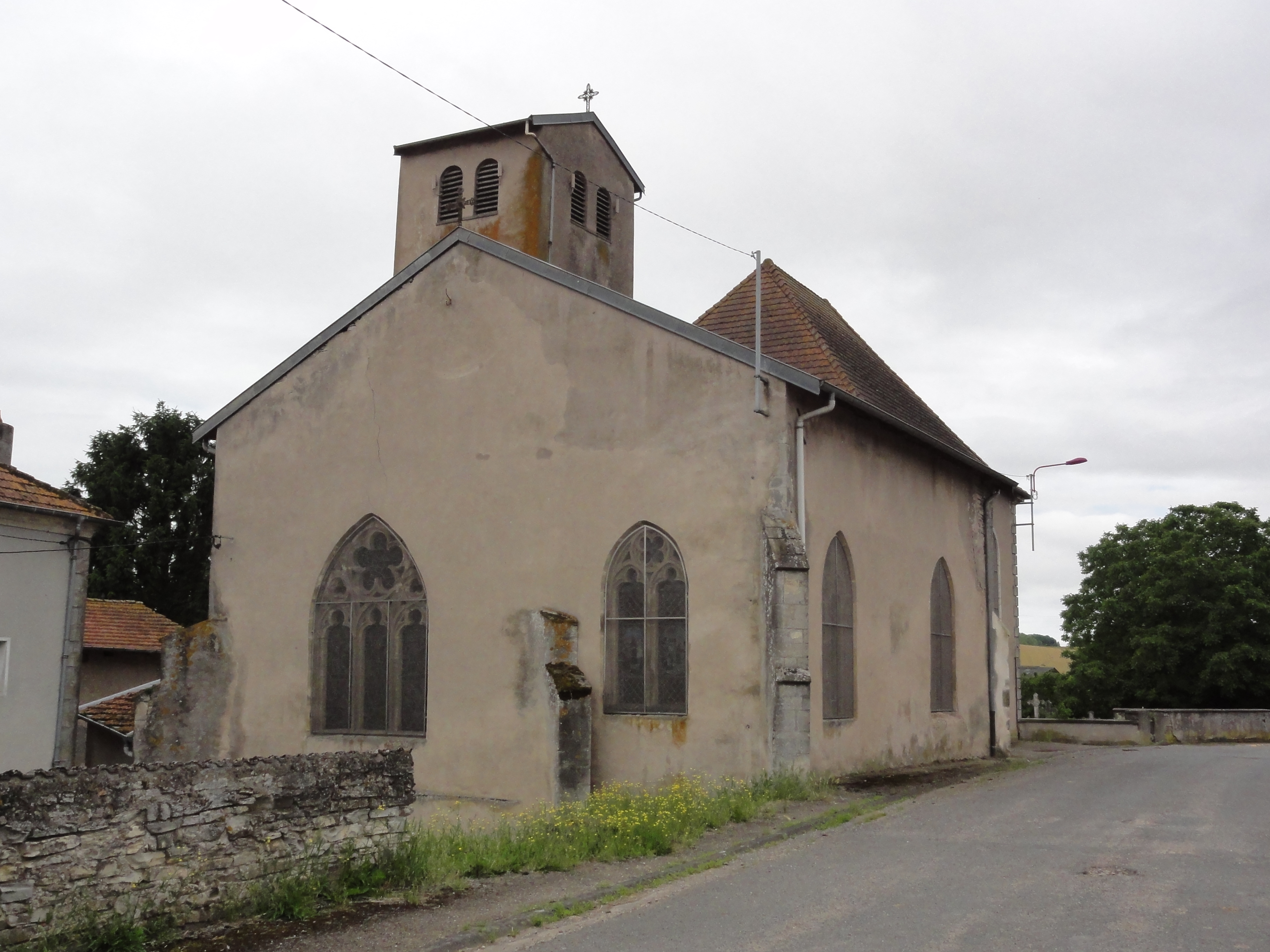
- The church in Haussonville

- Coat of arms
- Location of Haussonville
- Location within France Location within Grand Est
- Coordinates: 48°31′47″N 6°19′36″E
- Country: France
- Region: Grand Est
- Department: Meurthe-et-Moselle
- Arrondissement: Lunéville
- Canton: Lunéville-2
- Intercommunality: CC Meurthe, Mortagne, Moselle

Government
  - Mayor (2020–2026): Christian Boucaud
- Area^{1}: 11.18 km^{2} (4.32 sq mi)
- Elevation: 310 m (1,020 ft)
- Highest elevation: 356 m (1,168 ft)
- Lowest elevation: 237 m (778 ft)
- Population (2023): 324
  - Density: 29.0/km^{2} (75.1/sq mi)
- Time zone: UTC+01:00 (CET)
  - Summer (DST): UTC+02:00 (CEST)
- INSEE/Postal code: 54256 /54290
- ^{1} French Land Register data, which excludes lakes, ponds, glaciers > 1 km^{2} (0.386 sq mi or 247 acres) and river estuaries.

Haussonville (French pronunciation: [osɔ̃vil]) is a commune in the Meurthe-et-Moselle department in north-eastern France.

== See also ==
- Communes of the Meurthe-et-Moselle department
