= Vennezey =

- Commune
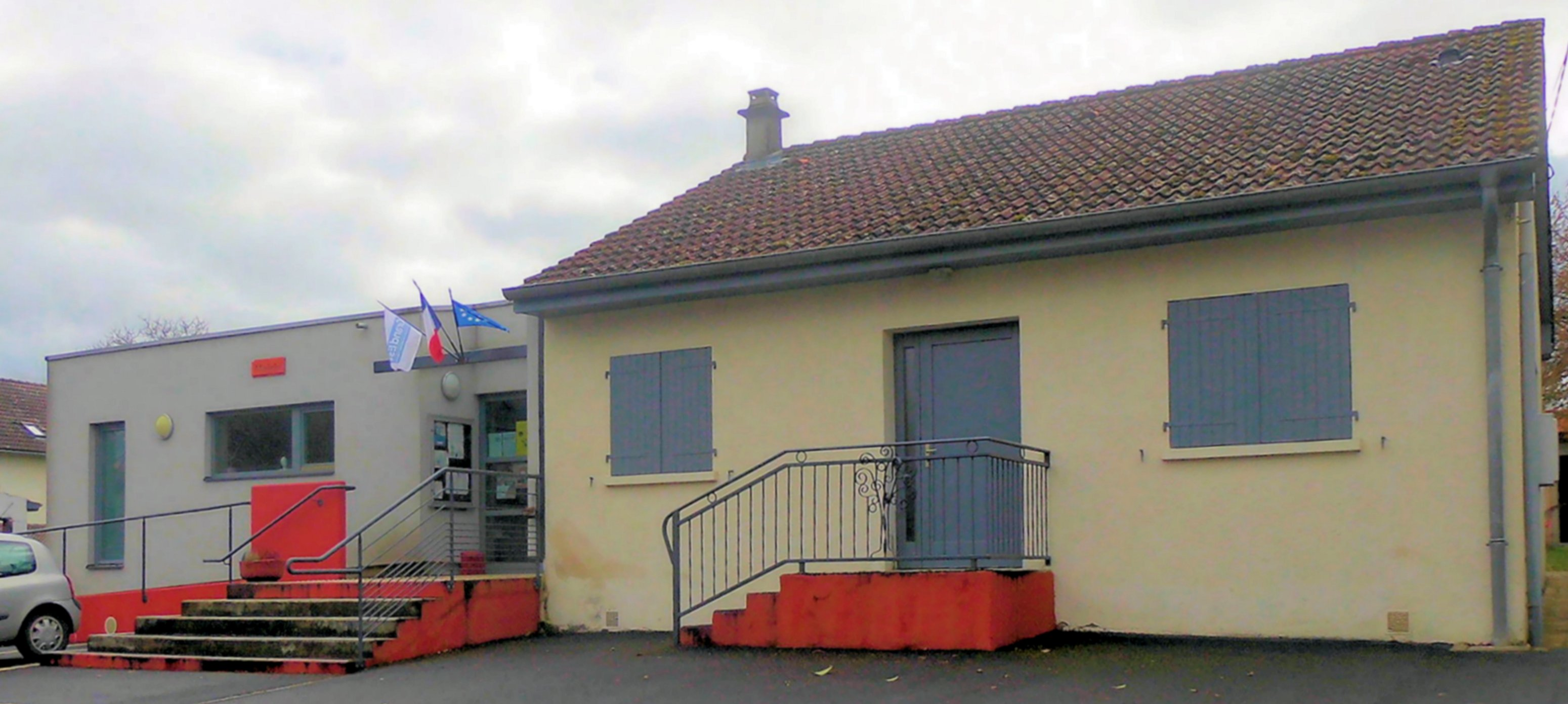
- The town hall in Vennezey

- Coat of arms
- Location of Vennezey
- Location within France Location within Grand Est
- Coordinates: 48°26′43″N 6°28′09″E
- Country: France
- Region: Grand Est
- Department: Meurthe-et-Moselle
- Arrondissement: Lunéville
- Canton: Lunéville-2
- Intercommunality: Meurthe, Mortagne, Moselle

Government
  - Mayor (2022–2026): Nicolas Balland
- Area^{1}: 3.43 km^{2} (1.32 sq mi)
- Elevation: 260 m (850 ft)
- Highest elevation: 303 m (994 ft)
- Lowest elevation: 267 m (876 ft)
- Population (2023): 37
  - Density: 11/km^{2} (28/sq mi)
- Time zone: UTC+01:00 (CET)
  - Summer (DST): UTC+02:00 (CEST)
- INSEE/Postal code: 54561 /54830
- ^{1} French Land Register data, which excludes lakes, ponds, glaciers > 1 km^{2} (0.386 sq mi or 247 acres) and river estuaries.

Vennezey (French pronunciation: [vɛnzɛ]) is a commune in the Meurthe-et-Moselle department in north-eastern France.

== See also ==
- Communes of the Meurthe-et-Moselle department
