= Giriviller =

- Commune
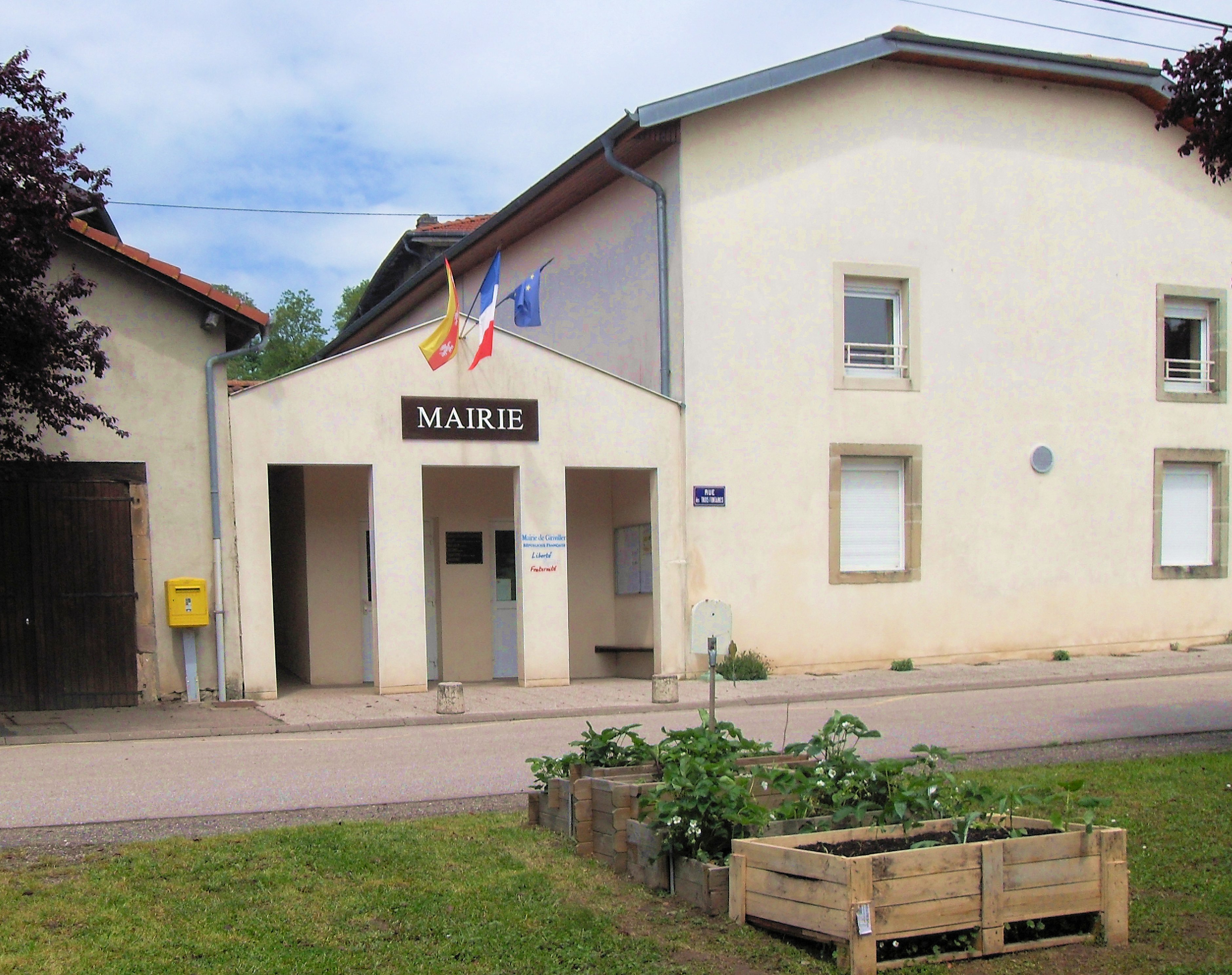
- The town hall in Giriviller

- Coat of arms
- Location of Giriviller
- Location within France Location within Grand Est
- Coordinates: 48°26′40″N 6°29′20″E
- Country: France
- Region: Grand Est
- Department: Meurthe-et-Moselle
- Arrondissement: Lunéville
- Canton: Lunéville-2
- Intercommunality: Meurthe, Mortagne, Moselle

Government
  - Mayor (2020–2026): Francis Roch
- Area^{1}: 7.71 km^{2} (2.98 sq mi)
- Elevation: 310 m (1,020 ft)
- Highest elevation: 347 m (1,138 ft)
- Lowest elevation: 274 m (899 ft)
- Population (2023): 71
  - Density: 9.2/km^{2} (24/sq mi)
- Time zone: UTC+01:00 (CET)
  - Summer (DST): UTC+02:00 (CEST)
- INSEE/Postal code: 54228 /54830
- ^{1} French Land Register data, which excludes lakes, ponds, glaciers > 1 km^{2} (0.386 sq mi or 247 acres) and river estuaries.

Giriviller is a commune in the Meurthe-et-Moselle department in north-eastern France.

== See also ==
- Communes of the Meurthe-et-Moselle department
