= Jean-Baptiste Claudot =

French painter (1733–1805)

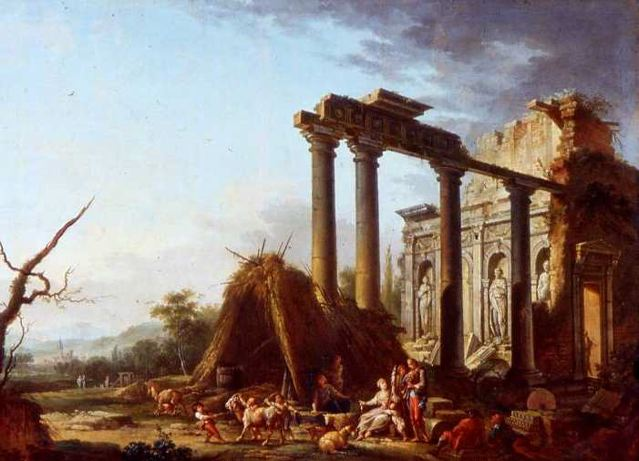
The colonnade in ruins, 1764

Jean-Baptiste Charles Claudot (French: [ʒɑ̃ batist ʃaʁl klodo]; 19 September 1733 – 27 December 1805) was a French painter and decorator. He specialized in landscapes, many of which featured ruins.

== Life and work ==
He was born in Badonviller and was descended from Nobles of the Robe. His father was a lawyer who later became a member of the Parlement de Nancy. Jean Girardet and André Joly were his art teachers.

Despite numerous commissions for paintings, mostly of a religious nature, he went to Paris in 1767 to complete his studies. There he became an associate and friend of Claude-Joseph Vernet. Although encouraged to remain in Paris, he returned home in 1769.

His landscapes were inspired by the vedute from 17th-century Venice, and by the works of his contemporary, Hubert Robert. He painted in several locations; including Nancy, Lunéville, Bayon, Metz and Pont-à-Mousson. He was one of the first French artists to make "portraits" of castles at their owner's request. Until then, that was almost entirely an English tradition.

His students included Jean Baptiste Isabey and Jean-Baptiste Jacques Augustin.

Claudot died in 1805 in Nancy. Several of his works are in that city's Museum of Fine Arts.

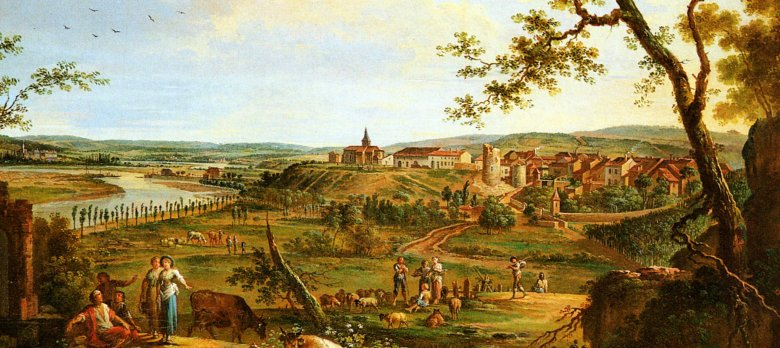
Bayon and the Moselle, ca. 1800
