= Jean-Baptiste Jacques Augustin =

French painter (1759–1832)

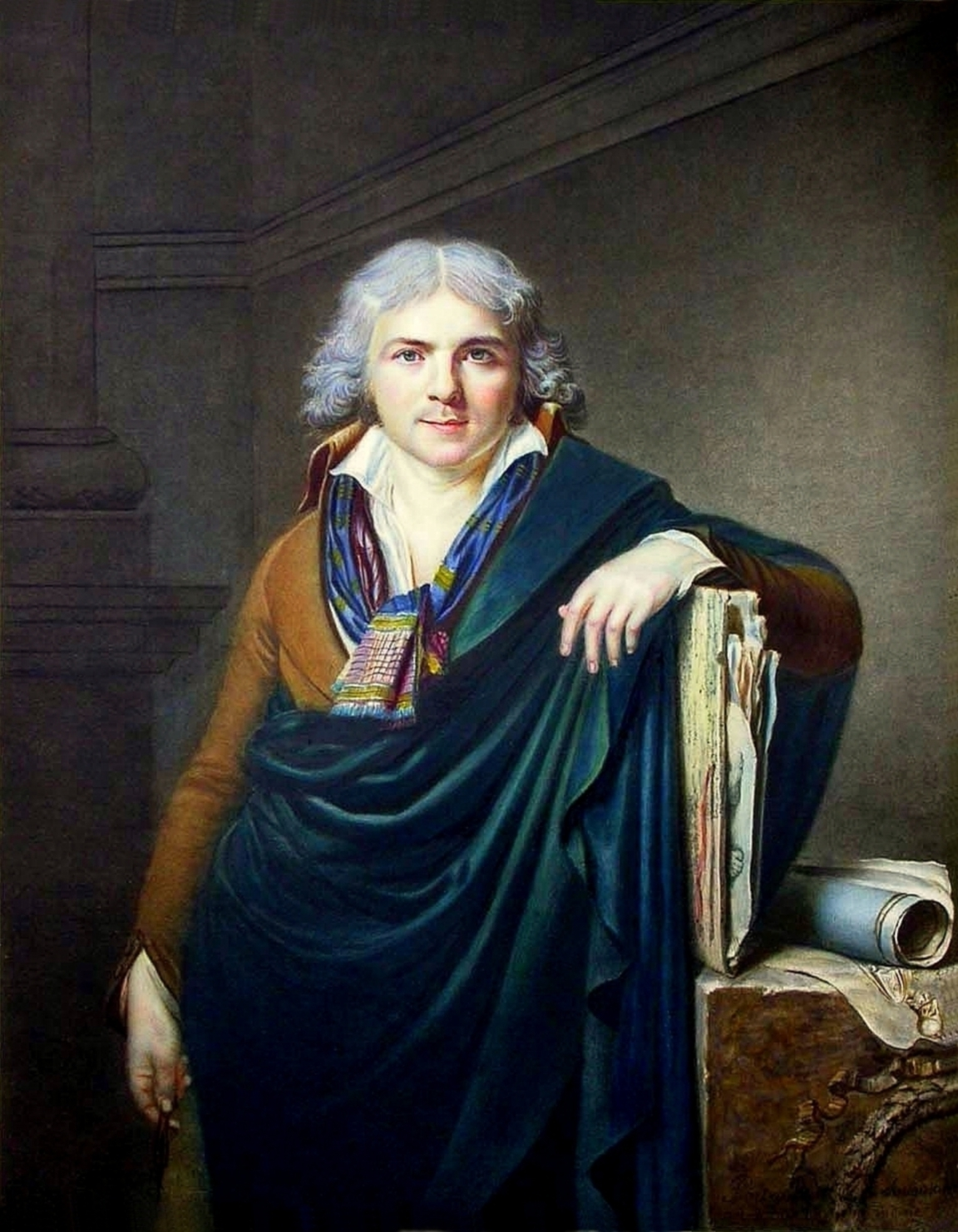
Self-portrait (1796)

Jean-Baptiste Jacques Augustin (August 15, 1759 – April 13, 1832) was a French miniature painter.

== Biography ==
Augustin was born in Saint-Dié-des-Vosges. His father was a master glazier. He displayed an aptitude for drawing from an early age, and his talent drew the attention of the steward of the local bishop. As a result, he was sent to Nancy for formal lessons. He probably studied with Jean-Baptiste Claudot, and possibly Jean Girardet as well.

In 1781, after a short stay in Dijon with his older brother Georges-Nicolas (1758–1800), a portrait miniaturist, he moved to Paris. At first, he worked in the studios of Pierre Gatien Philipon (1724–1787), but soon focused on miniatures and developed his own large clientele. He also became a popular teacher. His notable students included Lizinska de Mirbel, Alexandre de Latour and Fanny Charrin.

During the height of the French Revolution, he lived in his hometown. His first exhibition at the Paris Salon came in 1791, where he displayed portraits of the nobility, as well as revolutionaries. He would continue to exhibit there until 1831. In 1800, he married his pupil Pauline du Cruet, who was 22 years his junior. She produced numerous portraits in a style similar to his.

Later, he worked for Napoleon and his entourage. In 1806, he was awarded a gold medal and 250 Francs in recognition of his skills. His career survived the regime change and, in 1814, King Louis XVIII appointed him peintre ordinaire du Cabinet du roi (court painter). To this was added peintre des Affaires étrangères (painter of foreign affairs) and, in 1819, peintre en miniature de la Chambre et du Cabinet du roi (miniature painter of the royal court).

He was awarded the Legion of Honor in 1821. Not long after, he fell out of favor with the King and was replaced by his former student, Lizinska de Mirbel.

In his later years, he suffered from gout, and became increasingly incapacitated. His death came in 1832, from cholera, during the Second Pandemic. He was interred at the Père Lachaise Cemetery.

== Famous people painted by Augustin ==
- Louis Hector Chalot de Saint-Mart
- Louis Joseph, Prince of Condé
- Napoleon I and his family
- Louis XVIII, king of France
- Louis-Philippe d'Orléans, duke of Orléans (1773–1850)
- Marquise de Ségonzac
- Madame Récamier (1777–1849)
- Laurence Geneviève Vanhee, née Devinck, wife of the banker
- General Laconpérie
- Charles Antoine Callamard (1776–1821) Paris, Louvre
- Charles Ferdinand, Duke of Berry (1778–1820)
- Antoine Denis Chaudet (1763–1810), sculptor
- Madame de Kercado
- Louis Joseph Auguste Coutan (1779–1830)
- Marie Joseph Georges Rousse, the former president of the Chambre des notaires de Paris
- Anne de Dorat, countess Coiffier de Moret
- Anne Josephe Theroigne de Mericourt (1762–1817), singer and revolutionary.

== See also ==
- Portrait miniature

== Bibliography ==
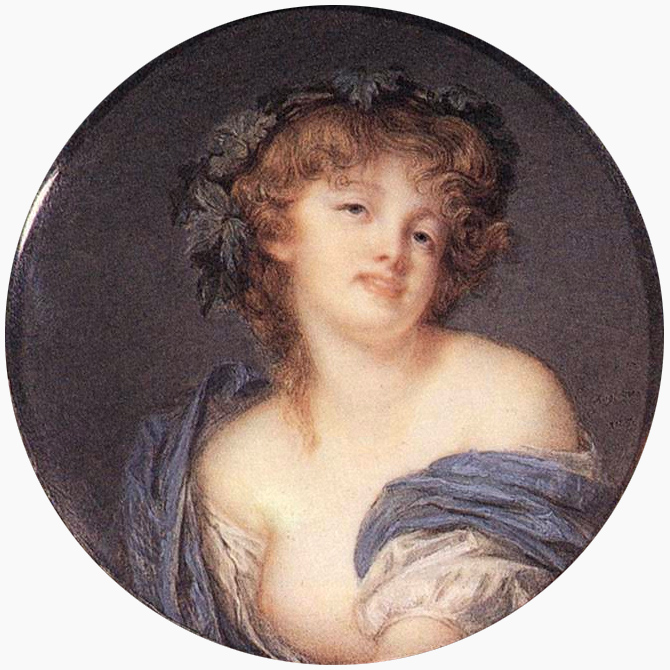
Bacchante (ivory miniature of 1799)

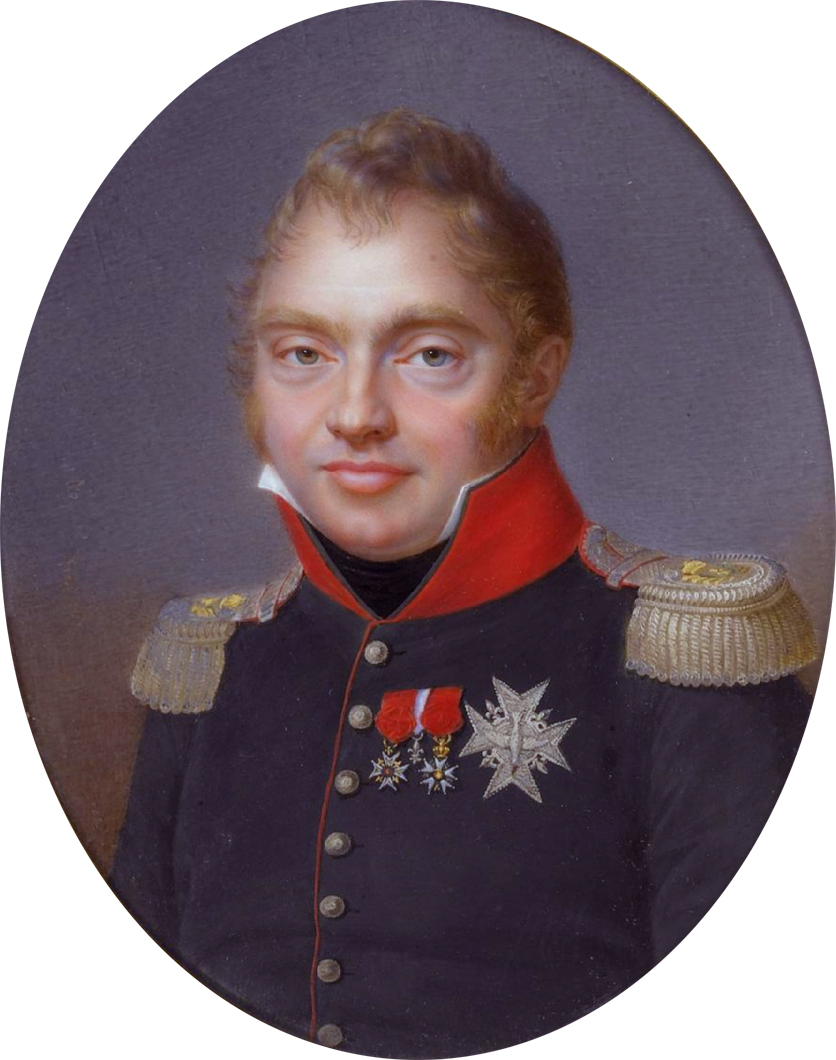
Charles Ferdinand, Duke of Berry

- Henri Bouchot, La Miniature française de 1750 à 1825, Goupil, 1907.
- Maria Carmen Espinosa Martín, Iluminaciones, pequeños retratos y miniaturas, Madrid, Fundación Lázaro Galdiano, 1999, 362 p.
- Fleuriot de Langle et Schlumberger, "Les miniatures de Jacques Augustin", Connaissance des Arts, n° 69, November 1957
- Camille Mauclair, Les Miniatures de l'Empire et de la Restauration, portraits de femmes, Paris, H. Piazza, 1913, 137 p.
- Bernd Pappe, „Jean-Baptiste Jacques Augustin et son atelier à Paris“, in: Nicole Garnier-Pelle (Hrsg.), La miniature en Europe. Actes du colloque organisé par la fondation pour la sauvegarde et le développement du domaine de Chantilly, Maison de Sylvie, 10 et 11 octobre 2007, Paris 2008, p. 100-105.
- Bernd Pappe, „Augustin Dubourg, Augustin fils/neveu et Joseph-Ange Augustin: trois artistes d’une même famille dans l’ombre de leur célèbre parent“, in: Nathalie Lemoine-Bouchard (ed.), La miniature en Europe. Des portraits de propagande aux oeuvres éléphantesques, Paris 2013, S. 58–62.
- Bernd Pappe, „Jean-Baptiste Jacques Augustin et Louis Febvrel, une amitié à distance mais de longue durée“, in: Nathalie Lemoine-Bouchard (ed.), Lettre de la miniature, Nr. 18, 2013, S. 3–5.
- Bernd Pappe, „Le carnet d’esquisses de Pauline Augustin : quatre miniatures capitales et leurs dessins préparatoires“, in: Nathalie Lemoine-Bouchard (ed.), Lettre de la miniature, Nr. 31, 2015, S. 3–8.
- Bernd Pappe (ed.): Jean-Baptiste Jacques Augustin. Peintre en miniature. Saint-Dié des Vosges, 2010, ISBN 978-2-9532029-6-0 (exhibition catalogue, Musée Pierre-Noël, Saint-Dié-des-Vosges, 17 April - 20 June 2010).
- Bernd Pappe: Jean-Baptiste Jacques Augustin 1759–1832. Une nouvelle excellence dans l'art du portrait en miniature. Scripta, Verona 2015, ISBN 978-88-98877-23-2.
- Charles Peccatte, "Jean Baptiste Jacques Augustin", Bulletin de la Société philomatique vosgienne, t. XXXIX, p. 61-88
- J. L. Propert, History of Miniature Art, London, 1887.
- Albert Ronsin (under the direction of), Les Vosgiens célèbres. Dictionnaire biographique illustré, Vagney (88120), Éditions Gérard Louis, 1990, 394 p.
- H. Roujon, "La Miniature", Illustration, Christmas 1912
- Gaston Save, „Jacques Augustin“, Bulletin de la société philomatique vosgienne, 1880–81, Nr. 6, S. 91-102.
- Gaston Save, „Jacques Augustin“, Bulletin de la société philomatique vosgienne, 1881–82, Nr. 7, S. 103–111.
- Gaston Save, Augustin, miniaturiste lorrain, Nancy 1888.
- G. C. Williamson, History of Portrait Miniatures, 1904.
