= Stipple engraving =

Technique in an intaglio print

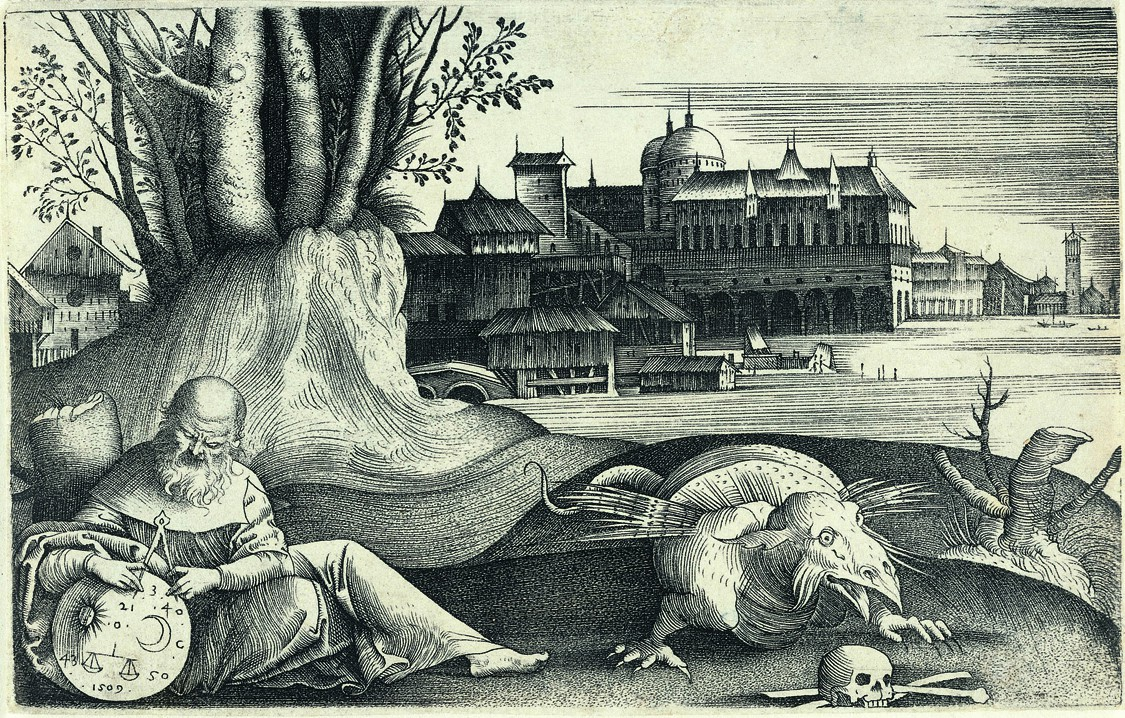
Giulio Campagnola, The Astrologer, c. 1509, with areas such as the dark foreground, the man's bald head, and the tree trunks created by a burin stippling technique.

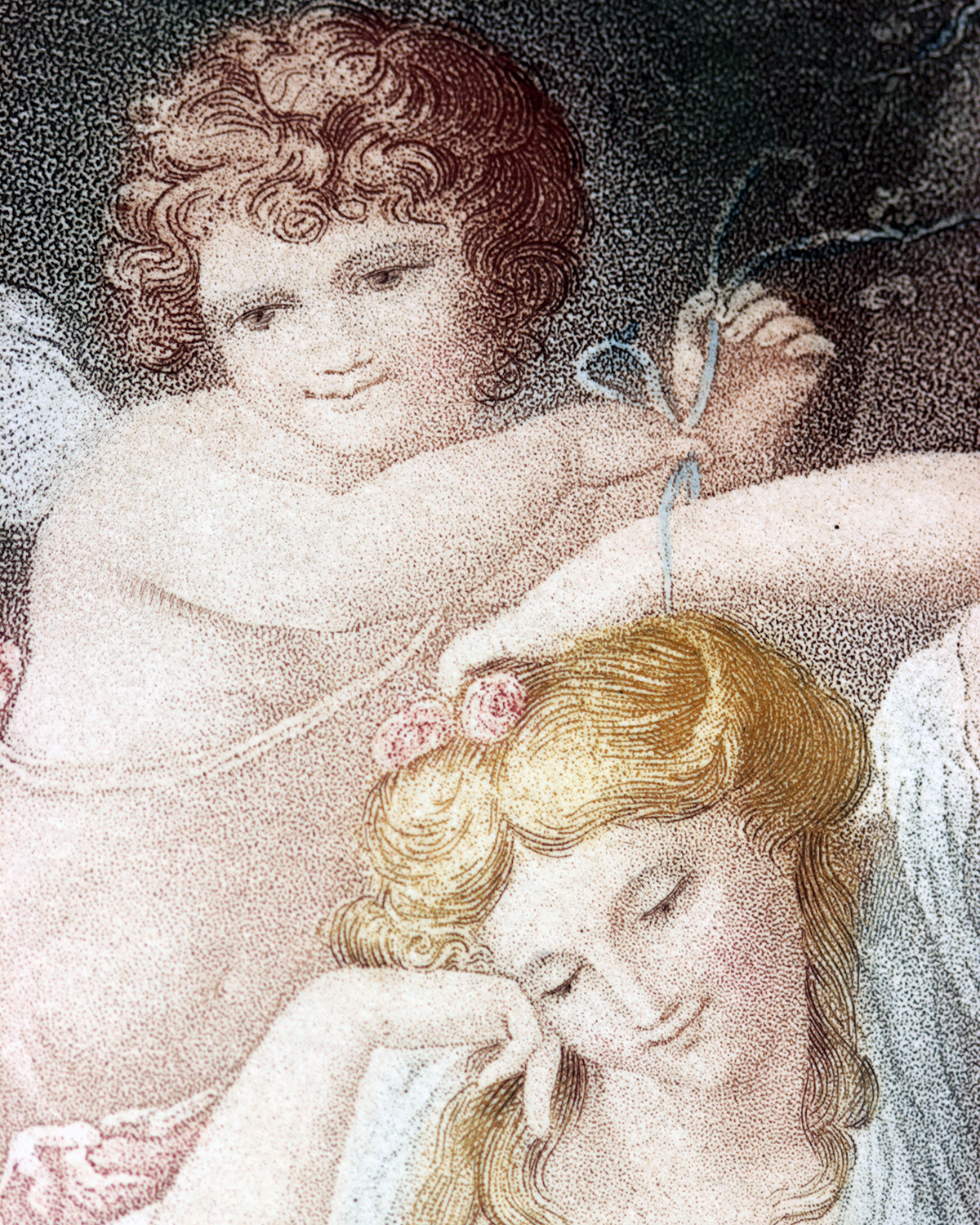
An example of the mastery of coloured stipple engraving by Francesco Bartolozzi (1727–1815) Cupid Binding Aglaia to a Laurel, detail, after Angelica Kauffmann (1741–1807)

Stipple engraving is a technique used to create tone in an intaglio print by distributing a pattern of dots of various sizes and densities across the image. The pattern is created on the printing plate either in engraving by gouging out the dots with a burin, or through an etching process. Stippling was used as an adjunct to conventional line engraving and etching for over two centuries, before being developed as a distinct technique in the mid-18th century.

The technique allows for subtle tonal variations and is especially suitable for reproducing chalk drawings.

== Early history ==
Stipple effects were used in conjunction with other engraving techniques by artists as early as Giulio Campagnola (c. 1482 – c. 1515) and Ottavio Leoni (1578–1630), although some of Campagnola's small prints were almost entirely in stipple. In Holland in the seventeenth century, the printmaker and goldsmith Jan Lutma developed an engraving technique, known as opus mallei, in which the dots are punched into the plate by an awl struck with a hammer, while in England the faces of portraits were engraved with stippled dots by William Rogers in the sixteenth century and Lucas Vorsterman in the seventeenth.

== Eighteenth century ==
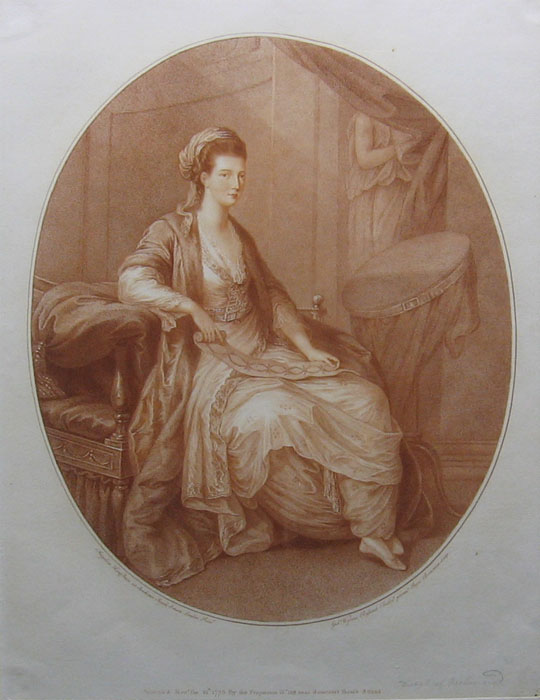
The Duchess of Richmond, a stipple engraving portrait by William Wynne Ryland after Angelica Kauffman (1775)

An etched stipple technique known as the crayon manner, suitable for producing imitations of chalk drawings, was pioneered in France. Gilles Demarteau used in 1756 goldsmith's chasing tools and marking-wheels to shade the lines in a series of Trophies designed by Antoine Watteau. Jean-Charles François who was a partner of Demarteau further developed the technique and used it to engrave the whole plate. François engraved in 1757 three etchings directly on copper in crayon manner. He then used the technique to etch three plates using different-size needles bound together. Other people who contributed to this new engraving technique included Alexis Magny and Jean-Baptiste Delafosse. William Wynne Ryland, who had worked with Jean-Charles François, took the crayon manner to Britain, using it in his contributions to Charles Roger’s publication A Collection of Prints in imitation of Drawings, and developing it further under the name of "stipple engraving".

The process of stipple engraving is described in T.H. Fielding's Art of Engraving (1841). To begin with an etching "ground" is laid on the plate, which is a waxy coating that makes the plate resistant to acid. The outline is drawn out in small dots with an etching needle, and the darker areas of the image shaded with a pattern of close dots. As in mezzotint use was made of roulettes, and a mattoir to produce large numbers of dots relatively quickly. Then the plate is bitten with acid, and the etching ground removed. The lighter areas of shade are then laid in with a drypoint or a stipple graver; Fielding describes the latter as "resembling the common kind, except that the blade bends down instead of up, thereby allowing the engraver greater facility in forming the small holes or dots in the copper". The etched middle and dark tones would also be deepened where appropriate with the graver.

In France the technique fed a fashion for reproductions of red chalk drawings by artists such as Antoine Watteau and François Boucher. Gilles Demarteau etched 266 drawings of Boucher in stipple, for printing in an appropriate sanguine-coloured ink and framing. These prints so resembled red chalk drawings that they could be framed as little pictures. They could then be hung in the small blank spaces of the elaborately decorated paneling of residences.

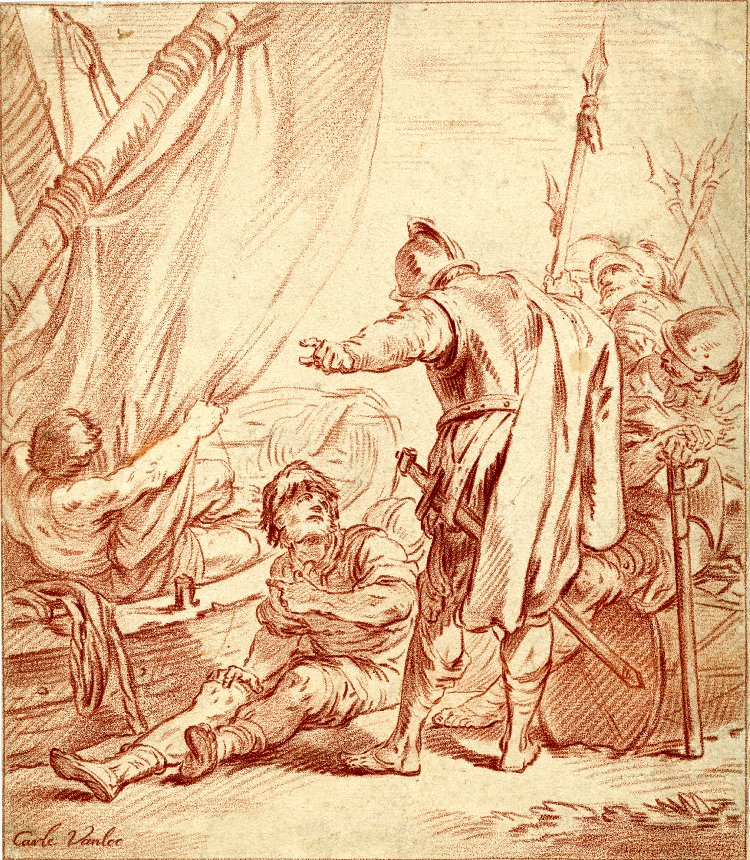
A group of soldiers, in crayon manner technique by Gilles Demarteau after Charles André van Loo

In England, the technique was used for "furniture prints" with a similar purpose and became very popular, though regarded with disdain by producers of the portrait mezzotints that dominated the English portrait print market. Stipple competed with mezzotint as a tonal method of printmaking, and while it lacked the rich depth of tone of mezzotint, it had the great advantage that far more impressions could be taken from a plate.

During the late eighteenth century, some printmakers, including Francesco Bartolozzi, began to use colour in stipple engraving. Rather than using separate plates for each colour, as in most colour printing processes of the time, such as Jacob Christoph Le Blon's three-colour mezzotint method, the different colours were carefully applied with a brush to a single plate for each impression, a highly skilled operation which soon proved economically unviable. This method is also known as à la poupée after the French term for the small cotton pads used for the inking.

== See also ==
- Halftoning
- Dither
