= Claude Charles =

French painter

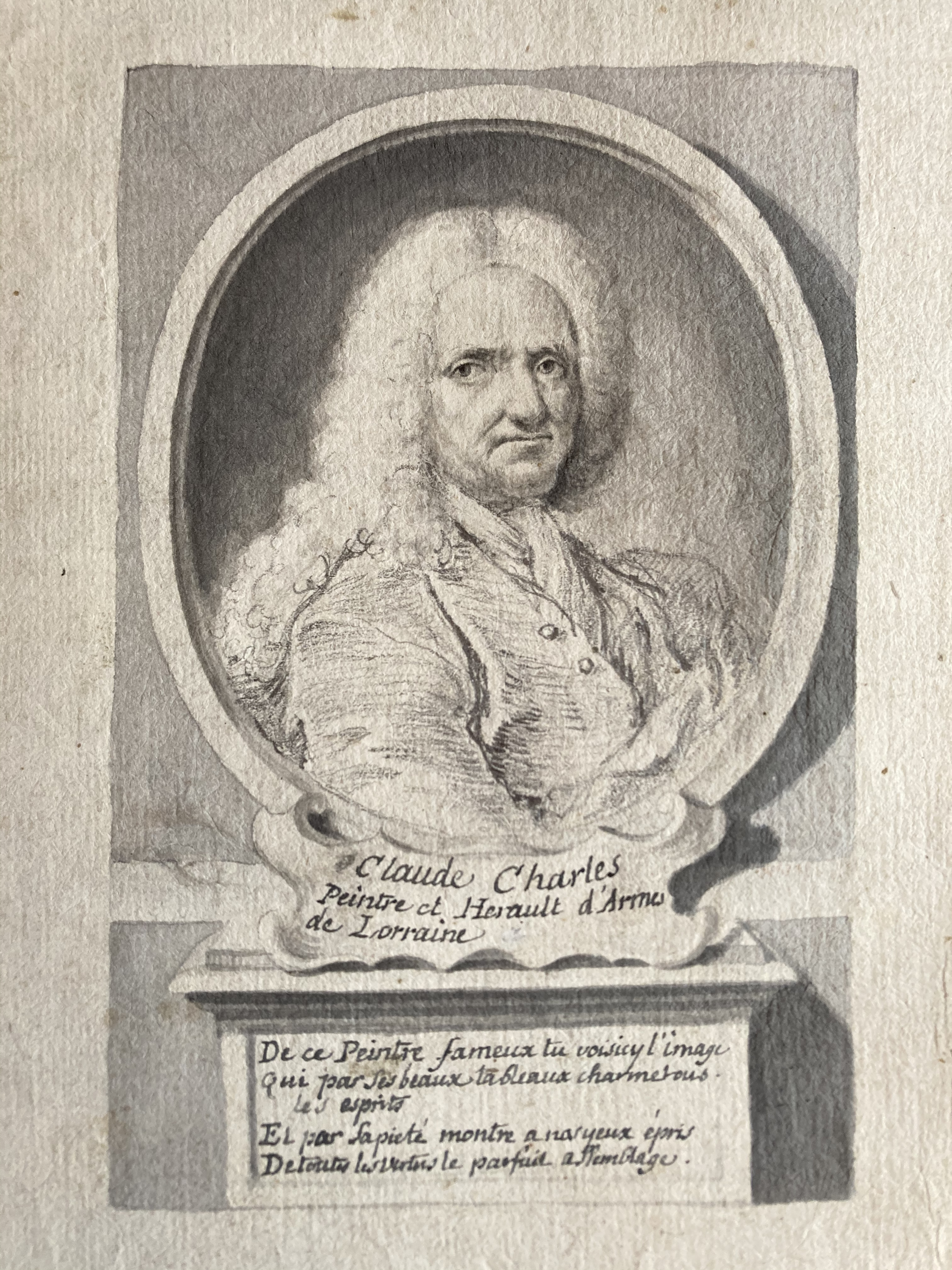
Claude Charles (artist unknown)

Claude Charles (6 January 1661, Nancy, Duchy of Lorraine – 4 June 1747, Nancy) was a historical and decorative painter from the Duchy of Lorraine. He also served as a Herald-at-Arms.

== Life and work ==
He was the son of Jean Charles, an attorney for the local bailiwick and a notary. His first art lessons were in Épinal with Jean-George Gérard (1642–1690); a painter of religious scenes.

At the age of only sixteen, he went to Rome. There, he spent nine years working with Giovanni Maria Morandi and Carlo Maratta, as well as several other artists. Later, he spent a short time in Paris, copying the works of Poussin at the gallery owned by Paul Fréart de Chantelou.

He returned to Nancy in 1688. Two years later, he married Anne Racle, from a family of goldsmiths and engravers.

In 1702, he was named the first Director of the Académie royale de peinture et de sculpture in Nancy. The following year, he became the Herald and court painter to Leopold, Duke of Lorraine. His notable students included Jean-Charles François, Jean Girardet; Claude Jacquart and Joseph Gilles.

He practiced a mixture of Baroque and traditional art and often collaborated on the designs of his larger works. Several theatrical sets, for example, were designed with the Galli da Bibiena family; acquaintances from his time in Rome. Twenty-seven of his works are classified as historical monuments.

== Selected works ==
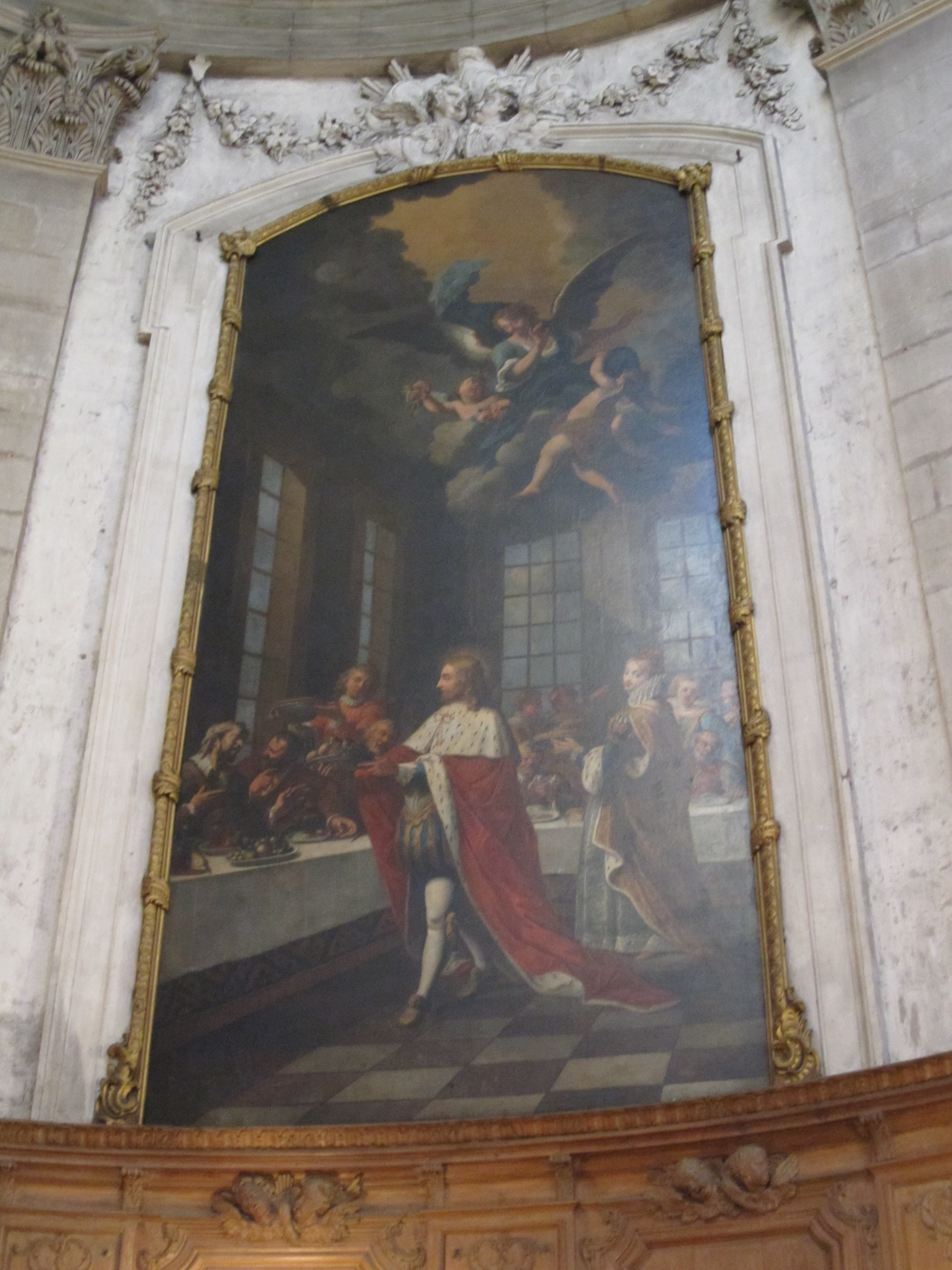
Saint Sigebert
Serving the Poor,
Nancy Cathedral

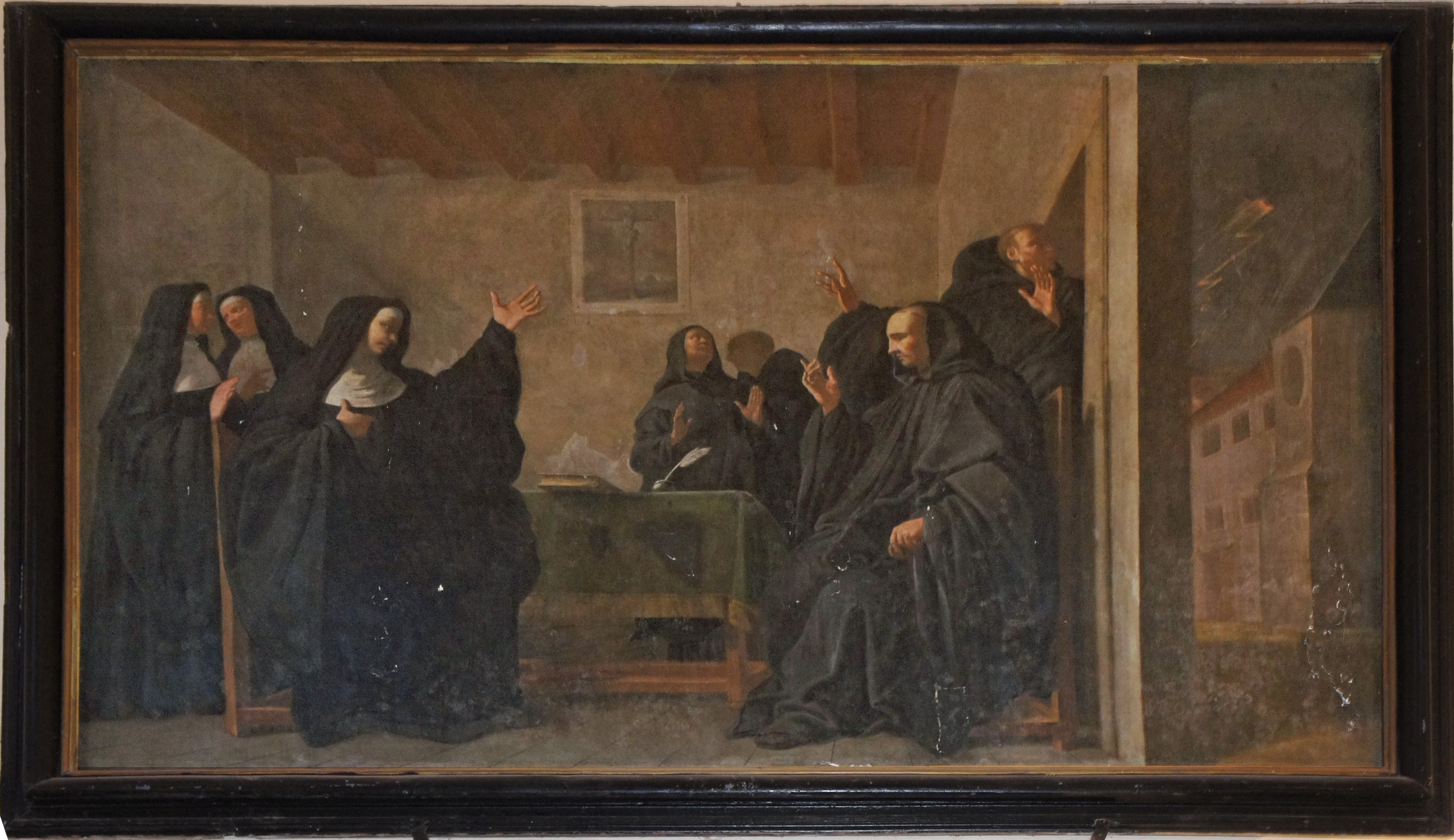
Saint Benedict Conversing with His Sister, Saint Scholastica,
Abbaye Saint-Pierre d'Hautvillers

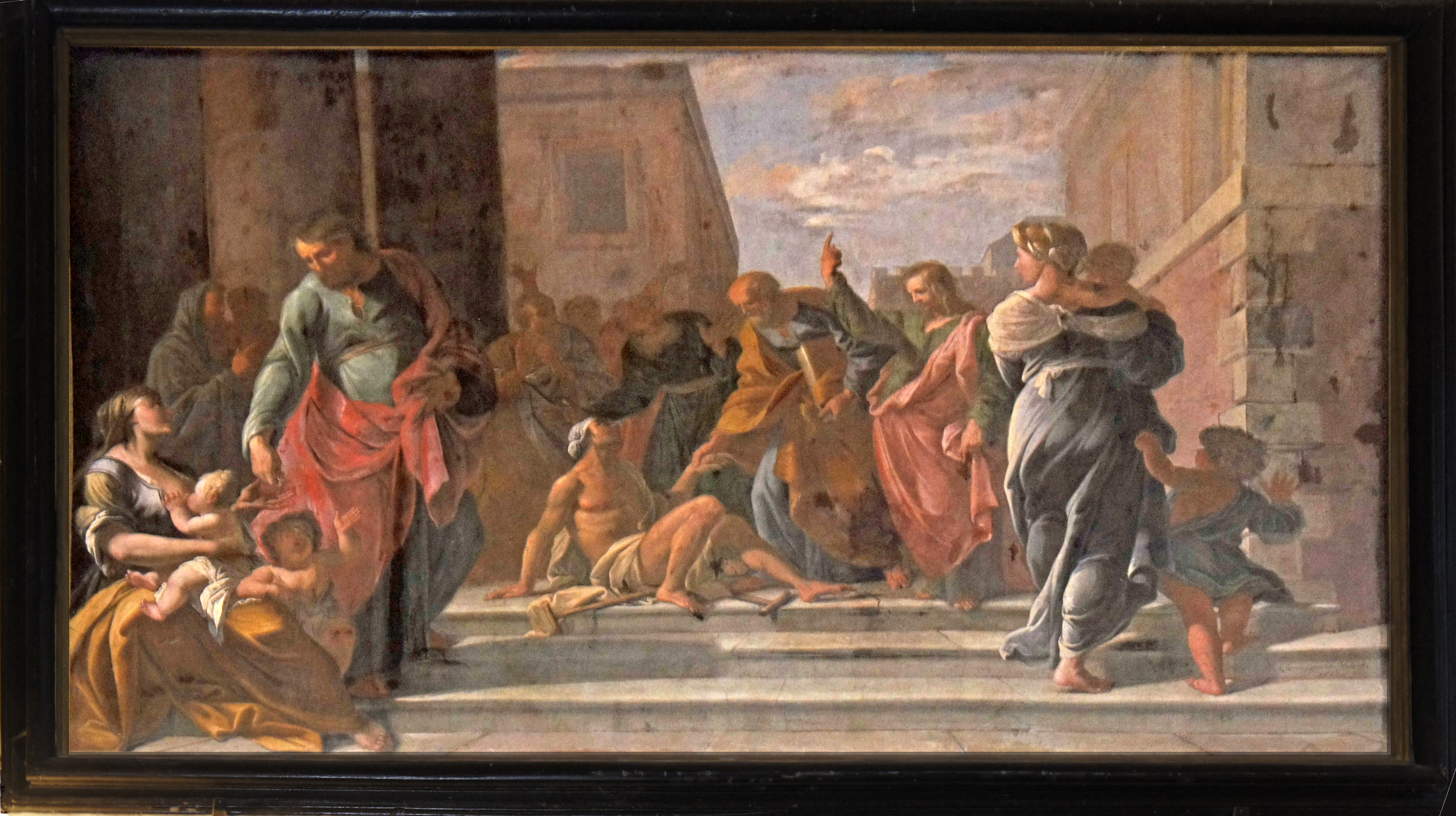
Saint Peter Healing the Paralytic,
Abbaye Saint-Pierre d'Hautvillers,

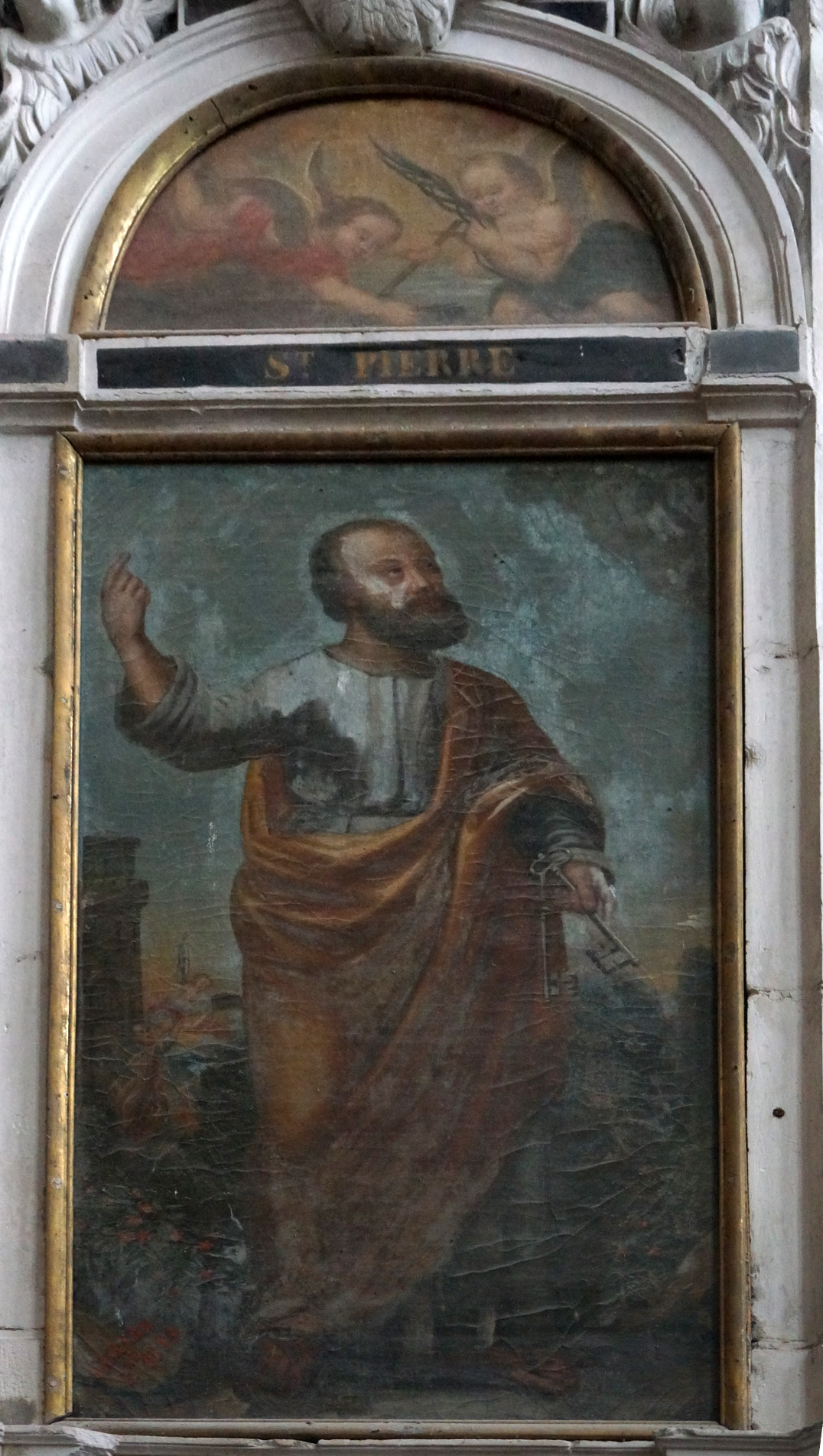
Saint Peter,
Toul Cathedral
