= Gilles Demarteau =

French etcher, engraver and publisher (1722–1776)

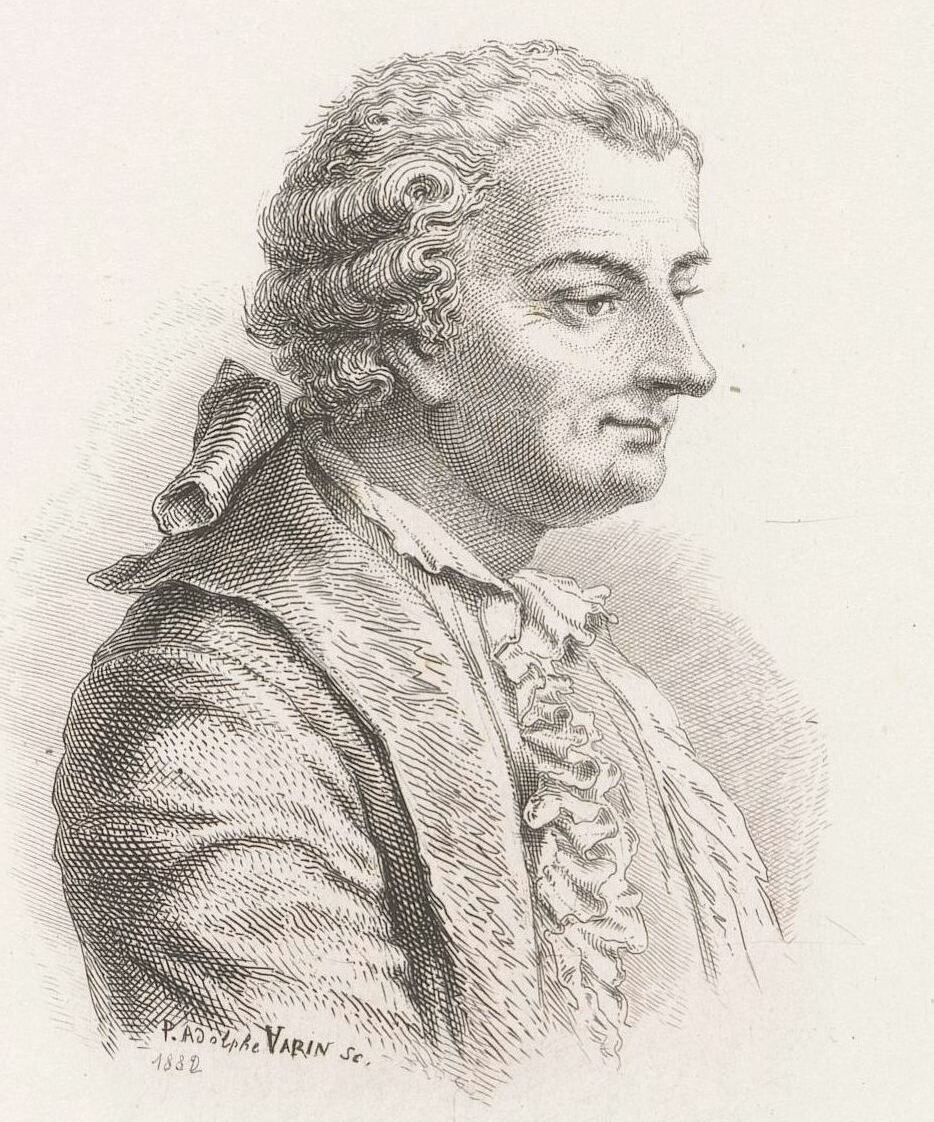
Portrait of Gilles Demarteau, by Adolphe Varin

Gilles Demarteau or Gilles Demarteau the Elder (19 January 1722, in Liège – 31 July 1776, in Paris) was an etcher, engraver and publisher who was active in Paris for his entire career. He is one of the persons to whom has been attributed the invention of the crayon manner of engraving. He is recognized as playing an important role in the development of this engraving technique. He was one of the key reproductive engravers and publishers of the work of François Boucher.

== Life ==
Gilles Demarteau was born in Liège, at the time in the Prince-Bishopric of Liège (now Belgium). His father was a gunsmith, from whom Demarteau learned metal engraving and the goldsmith's trade. He likely also studied drawing as he became one of the best draftsmen of his time. Still young, he joined in Paris his brother who worked there as a goldsmith. This was probably around 1748–1750. His brother worked for the Parisian engraver De Lacollombe, who is known chiefly for his designs and engravings of firearms ornaments. Gilles also joined the workshop of De Lacollombe as a 'graveur-ciseleur'. In this capacity he not simply worked as an engraver of prints but also trained to decorate metal objects, in particular goldsmiths' work.

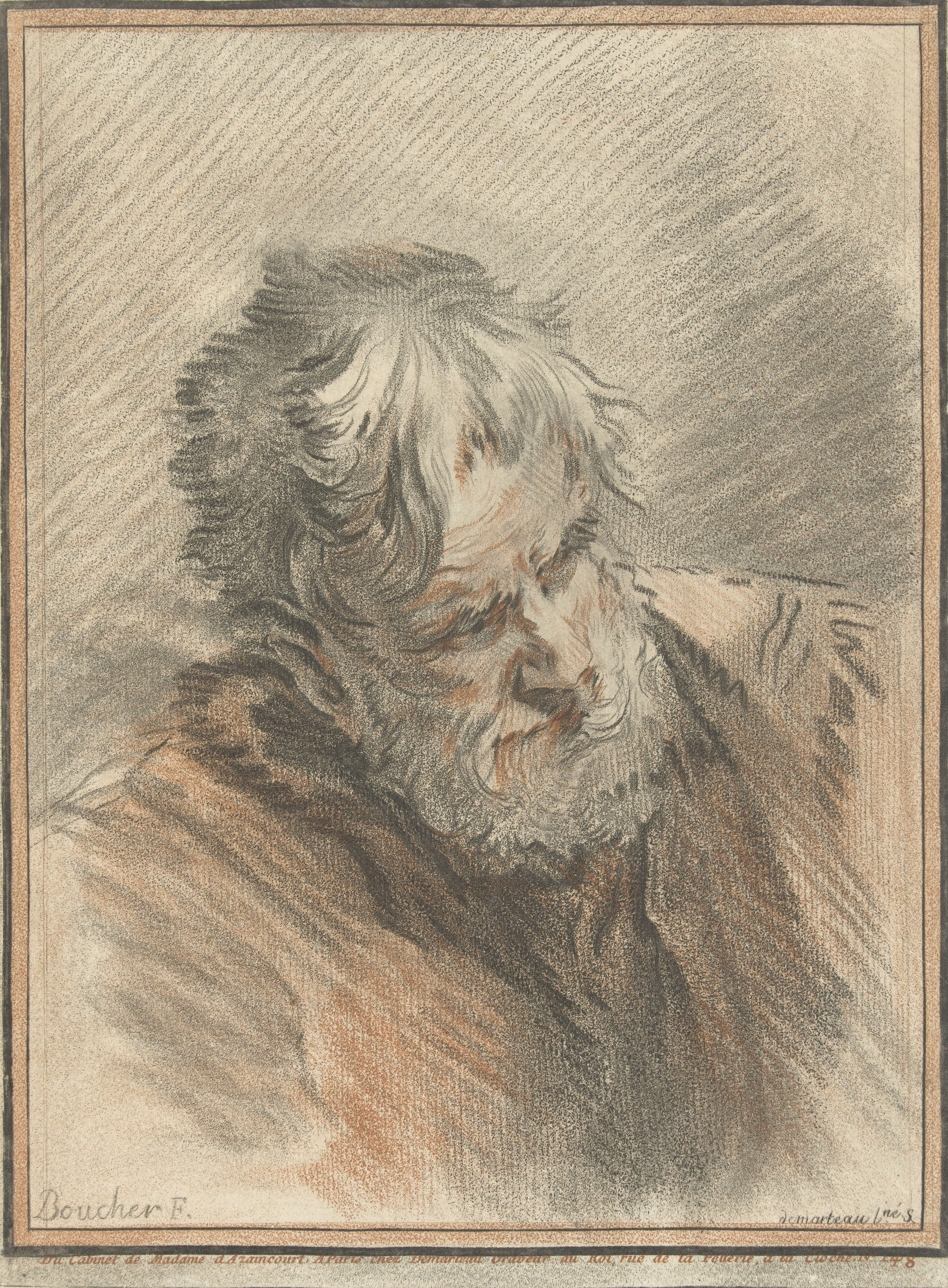
Head of an old man, after François Boucher

In 1746 at the age of 24, he was admitted as a master engraver-carver on all metals. His first known works date to the mid 1740s and consist of sheets of ornaments engraved with chisels for decoration rifles, pistols or snuff.

In 1755 he settled permanently in the rue de la Pelleterie, near the Royal Palace. Here he lived until his death. He also set up his own engraving workshop in the Rue de la Pelleterie, which operated under the shop sign 'à la Cloche'. The salon of the shop was decorated with paintings by François Boucher, Jean-Baptiste Huet and Jean-Honoré Fragonard and comprised a chimney piece, a fire screen with singeries, a now lost over-mantle including a large mirror surmounted by a floral painting and a second mirror hanging between two windows.

Gilles Demarteau used in 1756 goldsmith's chasing tools and marking-wheels to shade the lines in a series of Trophies designed by Antoine Watteau. Jean-Charles François who was a partner of Demarteau further developed the technique and used it to engrave the whole plate. François engraved in 1757 three etchings directly on copper in crayon manner. He then used the technique to etch three plates using different-size needles bound together. Other people who contributed to this new engraving technique included Alexis Magny and Jean-Baptiste Delafosse. François and Demarteau separated ways in 1757 over conflicts relating to who was entitled to call himself the inventor of the new technique. In 1759 Demarteau was joined in his studio by Louis-Marin Bonnet, a former pupil and collaborator of François. Bonnet engraved in that same year his first plate for Demarteau.

Demarteau cut in 1759 his first plate in the crayon manner, which would be the first of about 300 plates after François Boucher's drawings. Thanks to his superior drawing and engraving skills Demarteau was able to become the primary exponent of the crayon manner process in France. Demarteau's prints were very popular because of their technical brilliance and low price. Denis Diderot mentions his work on several occasions in his reports on the Parisian Salons.

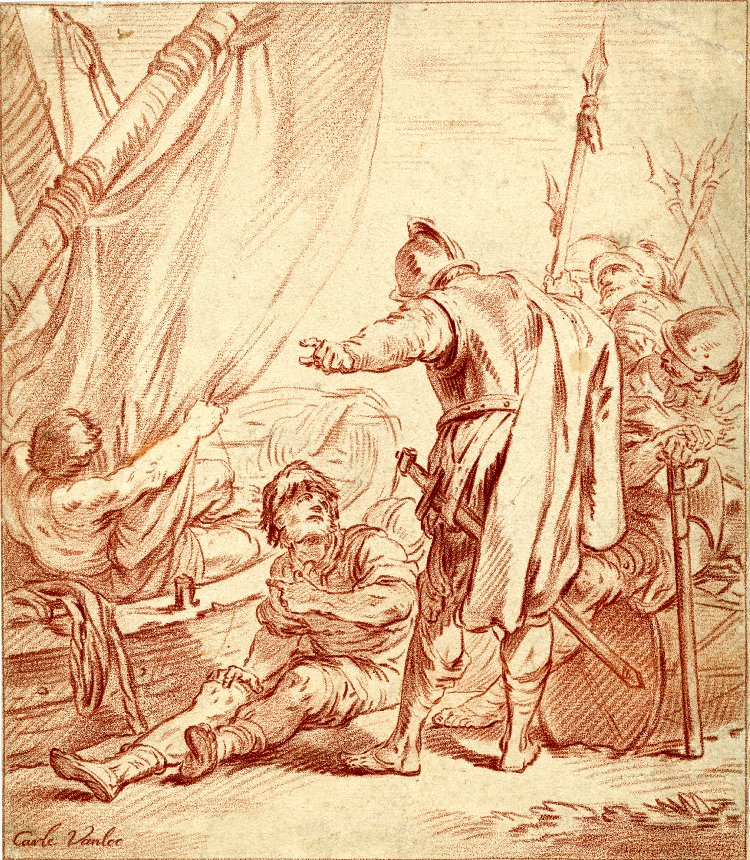
Group of soldiers, after Charles André van Loo

In 4 April 1767, Demarteau presented his first two-colour plates to the Académie française which gave him its approval. On 2 September 1769 he was admitted as a member of the Académie for his engraving of a print under the title Lycurgus. In this session, the designer Charles-Nicolas Cochin was also admitted for his design of that print.

The following year Demarteau was appointed engraver to the King ('Graveur des Dessins du Cabinet du Roi') and received a pension of six hundred livres (pounds). He replaced the engraver Jean-Charles François in this position.

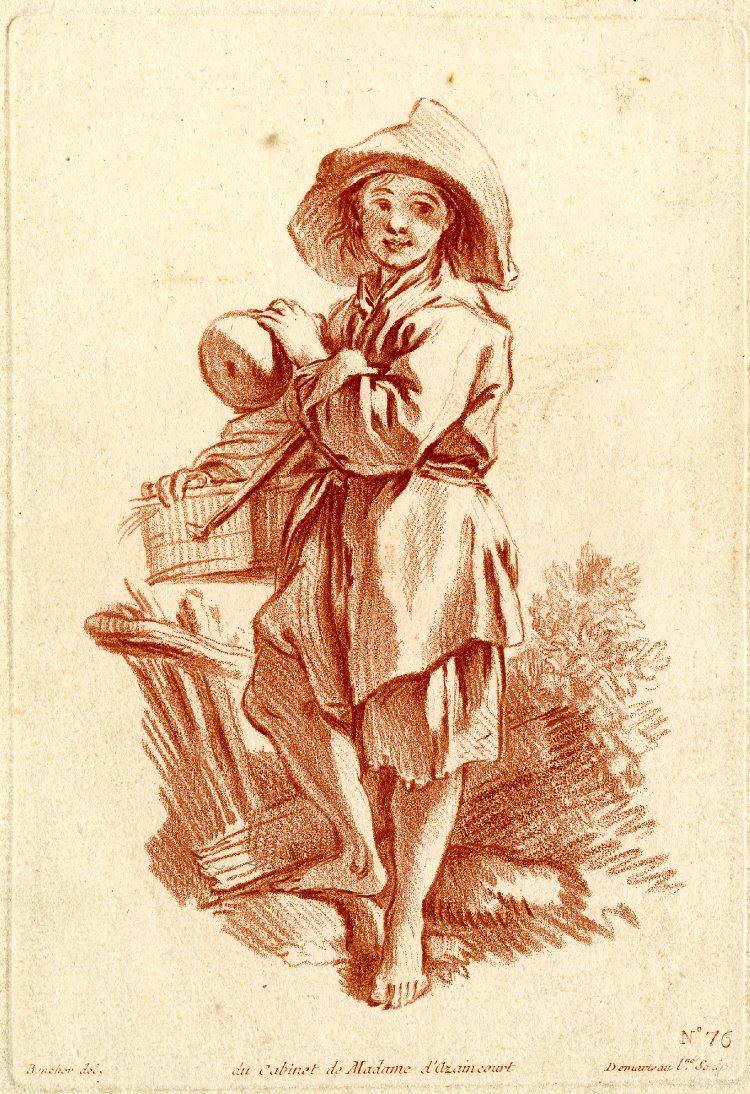
A peasant boy, after François Boucher

The artists Jean-Honoré Fragonard, François Boucher and Jean-Baptiste Huet painted decorative murals in the salon of Gilles Antoine Demarteau's house in the rue de la Pelleterie. The panels are now in the Carnavalet Museum in Paris.

His nephew Gilles Antoine Demarteau (also referred to as 'Gilles Antoine Demarteau the Younger') (1756-1802) became an engraver and took over his uncle's workshop. Demarteau collected a large number of drawings of prominent draughtsmen of his generation, the majority of which were inherited by his nephew and sold at auction on the death of his nephew in 1802.

== Work ==
Gilles Demarteau was mainly a reproductive artist who worked in the new crayon manner style which he had helped to invent. His oeuvre comprises about 560 numbered plates.

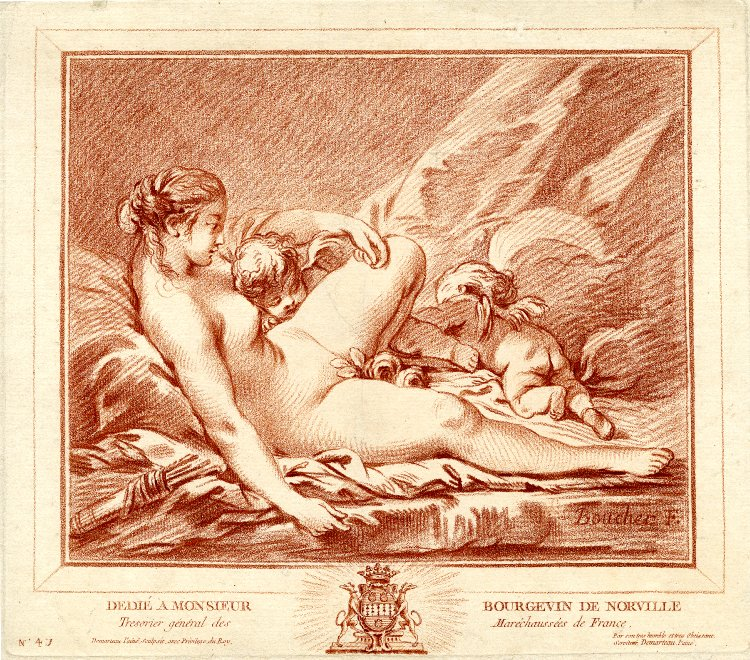
Nude female figure with putti, after François Boucher

His first known works were made using the etching technique and the burin and were made for book and music publishers. He also made illustrations of La Fontaine's Fables.

His reproductive works were mainly made after the works of Charles-André van Loo, Jean-Baptiste Huet, Charles-Nicolas Cochin, Antoine Watteau and most frequently François Boucher. Half of his works were made after drawings by François Boucher or after drawings owned by collectors such as the family Blondel d’Azincourt. Painters of the 18th century were accustomed, before beginning a painting, to make sketches in sanguine. They regularly executed these sketches with pencils of different colors. The crayon manner of engraving allowed engravers like Gilles Demarteau to produce faithful reproductions of these designs. These prints in red ink so much resembled red chalk drawings that they could be framed as little pictures. They could then be hung in the small blank spaces of the elaborately decorated paneling of homes.

Demarteau also engraved about 40 drawing manuals, which included plates after designs by Jean-Pierre Houël, Jean-Baptiste Huet and the sculptor Edmé Bouchardon.

Around 1750-55 Demarteau published a pattern book with 19 plates devoted solely to firearms decorations. At the end of his career Demarteau commenced reproductions of the works of Raphael or Michelangelo.
