= Jean-Baptiste Huet =

French painter (1745–1811)

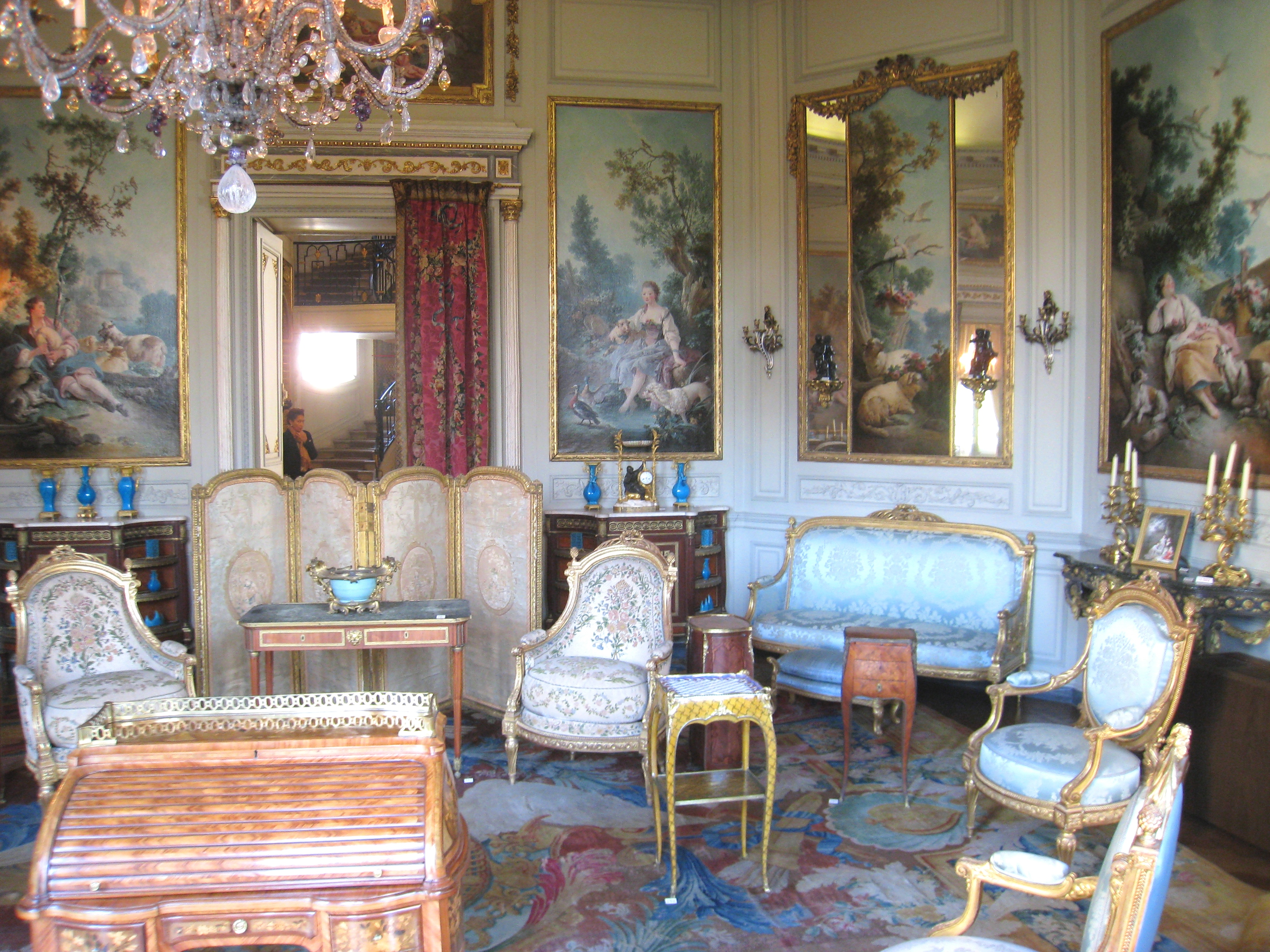
Paintings by Jean-Baptiste Huet in the Musée Nissim de Camondo, Paris.

Jean-Baptiste Marie Huet (French pronunciation: [ʒɑ̃ batist maʁi ɥɛ]; Paris, 15 October 1745 – Paris, 27 January 1811) was a French painter, engraver and designer associated with pastoral and genre scenes of animals in the Rococo manner, influenced by François Boucher.

Born into a family of artists— his uncle was Christophe Huet, his father Nicolas Huet—he apprenticed with the animal painter Charles Dagomer, a member of the painters' guild, the Académie de Saint-Luc, Paris, who was working in the 1760s. Huet's interest in printmaking and his acquaintance with Gilles Demarteau, who later engraved many of his compositions, both date from this period. About 1764 Huet entered the studio of Jean-Baptiste Le Prince, where he further developed his printmaking skills, largely reproducing his own paintings, a method of publishing them with some profit.

In 1768 he was approved (agréé) by the Académie Royale, and 29 July 1769 he was received (reçu) in the minor category (petite manière) of painter of animals and was well received in the public reviews when he began to exhibit at the Paris Salon that same year, with a Dog Attacking Geese, now at the Louvre. He continued to exhibit annually until 1789, though his attempts at the grand manner of history painting, considered the noblest genre, were not met with approval.

The most important of his paintings were his morceaux de réception, the Fox among the Chickens (San Francisco, California Palace of the Legion of Honor), The Dairymaid (Paris, Musée Cognacq-Jay).

Huet is equally known for his designs for the decorative arts. He provided scenic vignettes to be printed by copperplate on cottons at the manufacture of toiles de Jouy directed by Oberkampf. Lengths of these may be seen at The Detroit Institute of Arts, the Musée des Arts Décoratifs, the Victoria and Albert Museum, the Metropolitan Museum of Art and many other institutions. His ink-and-wash drawings and studies of animals and children are also admired.

In the 1780s he provided tapestry cartoons for the manufacture at Beauvais. A suite of thirteen hangings of pastorals was in the Isaac de Camondo bequest to the Louvre. In 1790 he remained attached to the reorganized and combined tapestry manufacture of Gobelins and Beauvais.
