= Fanny Charrin =

French painter (1784–1854)

- Born: 1781; Lyon, France
- Died: 5 July 1854 (aged 72–73); Paris
- Occupation: Portrait painter

Fanny Charrin (1781 – 1854) was a French portrait painter specializing in miniatures and painting on porcelain. Her work was exhibited and awarded in 19th-century Paris Salons.

== Biography ==
Charrin was born in Lyon, France, around 1781. Her older sister, Sophie Charrin was also a portrait painter and according to Sophie's baptismal certificate, their parents were François Charrin and Marie Ville.

Active in Paris, her work was exhibited at the Art Salons of 1806, 1808, 1810, 1812, 1814, 1822 and 1824. Fanny's studio was located at 20 Rue Neuve d'Orléans, Porte Saint-Denis during this time. She exhibited again in 1831 at the Fine Arts exhibition in Valenciennes, where she won a bronze medal and where a critic announced: "These miniatures are small paintings, pretty colors, perfect finish, well-drawn figures: it is not too much to award a bronze medal to their amiable author."

Charrin studied with two miniaturists: Étienne-Charles Le Guay and Jean-Baptiste Jacques Augustin, with whom she became a friend and one of his favorite pupils. She became famous for her painted figures on porcelain, which she made for the Sèvres porcelain manufactory in France from 1814 to 1826. Her work was notable for imparting an emotional charge to her sitters' gaze. She also gave private lessons. According to Doy, she earned 1,020 francs in 1817; 2,440 in 1818; 1,100 in 1819; 270 in 1820; 120 in 1822; and 1,380 francs in 1823.

She died at 70 in Paris on 5 July 1854, a single woman living at her home on Rue du Faubourg-Poissonnière.

== Iconography ==
J.-B. Augustin made several portraits of Fanny Charrin, including at least one held at the Louvre. (Portrait of Mademoiselle Fanny Charrin, Miniature on ivory, H. 15.7 cm, W. 11.1 cm, with inscriptions on the miniature, on the architrave of the temple: TEMPLE OF FRIENDSHIP/ FANNI KNOWS ALL THE WAYS OUT, at the foot of the model, on the path leading to the temple: Gratitude leads me there, Paris, Louvre Museum (Inv. No.: RF 3345, recto).

== Gallery ==
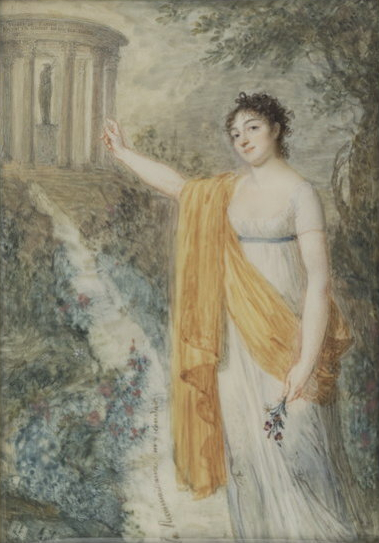
Portrait of Mademoiselle Fanny Charrin by Augustin

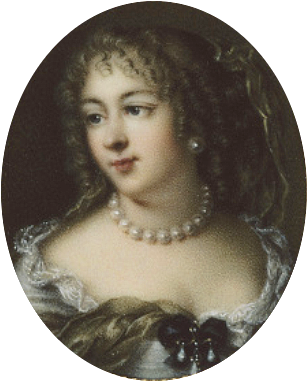
Miniature by Charrin

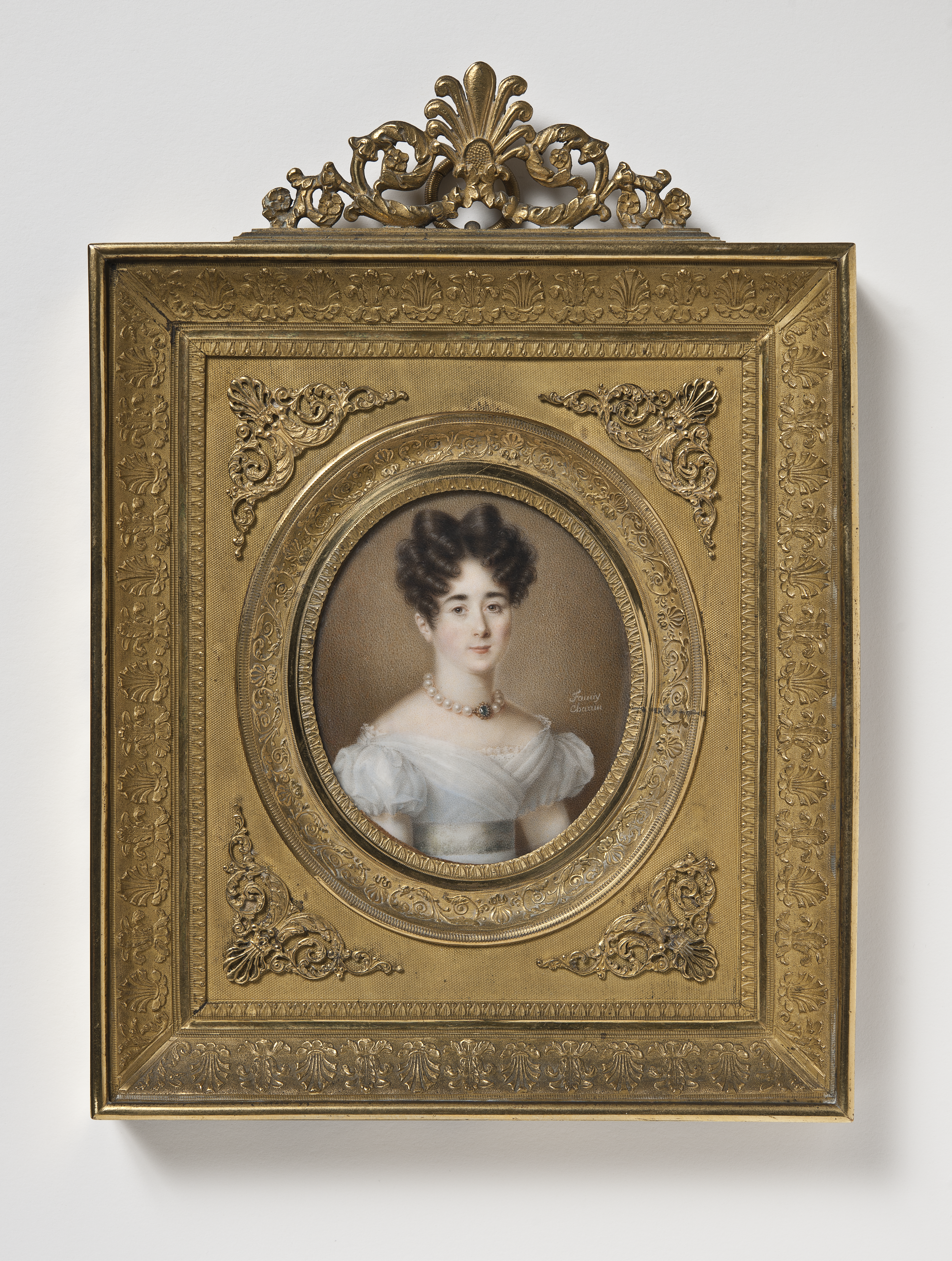
Portrait of a Woman with a Pearl Necklace. Stockholm, National Museum. By Charrin

== Selected works ==
- Horse artillery officer of the Guard, half-length, three-quarters view to the right, on a grey background, undated, signed, H. 7.7 cm, W. 6.5 cm. Formerly in the Bernard Franck collection. Formerly in the M. Courtois collection, no. 112. Exhibition: Montélimar Museum, From Warfare in Lace to Heroic Charges. 15 May – 15 September 2006, cat. no. 46 repr. Bibl.: Lemoine-Bouchard , Les Peintres en Miniature, 2008, p.154 repr. Sale at Drouot-Richelieu Chochon-Barré & Allardi, 16 June 2009 (Lot 249).
- A lady wearing a pink dress with voluminous sleeves and a gold scarf with refined pearl decoration, pearls also adorning her neck and ears, and a veil worn over her wavy blond hair, undated work, copy after Jean Petitot (1607–1691), enamel on ivory, H. 4.9 cm Sotheby's - Bonhams sale, London. 22 November 2006 (Lot no. 57).
- Madame de Sévigné wearing a white dress with an ochre shawl, a black bow, and teardrop-shaped pearls on her bodice, and other pearls on her neck and ears, undated work, enamel on ivory, H. 3.9 cm. Bonhams sale, London. 22 May 2003 (Lot 27).
- Young woman, bust-length; white dress and yellowish veil, miniature on ivory, H. 4.2 cm, W. 3.5 cm, Paris, Louvre Museum (Inv. No.: RF 153, recto).
- Portrait of a lady in a black sheath dress with a gold cord around her waist. Undated work. Christie's sale, London.
- Marshal Lannes. Undated, signed work on ivory, oval, H. 11 cm, W. 8.5 cm. Sale by Fraysse & Associates. 22 October 2008 (Lot 16).
