= William Wynne Ryland =

English engraver (died 1783)

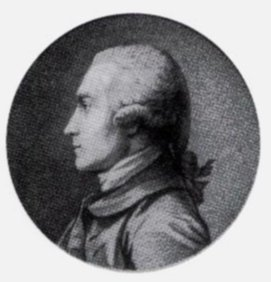
William Wynne Ryland, the portrait engraved in 1768 by D. P. Parset after P. Falconet

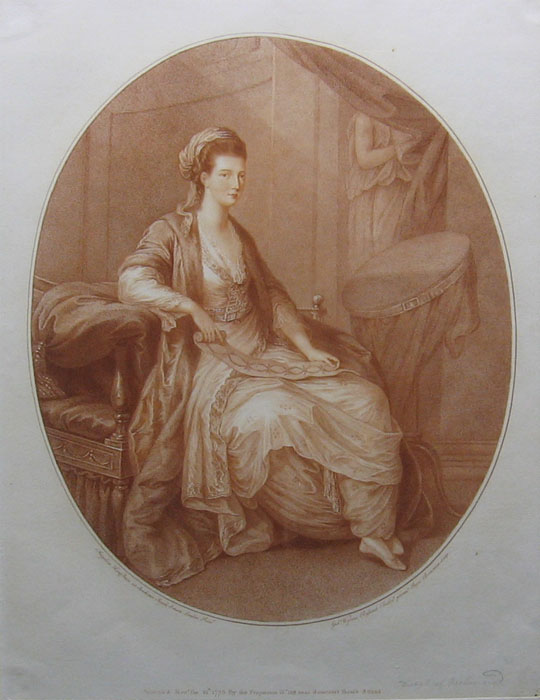
Duchess of Richmond (1775 stipple engraving)

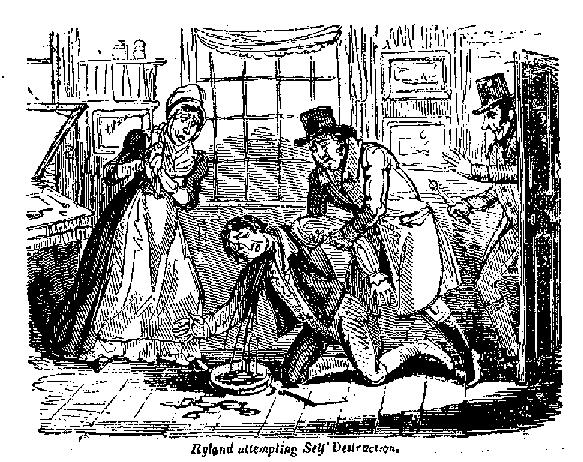
William Wynne Ryland attempting suicide.

William Wynne Ryland (1732 or July 1738 – 29 August 1783) was an English engraver, who pioneered stipple engraving and was executed for forgery.

== Life and work ==
Ryland was born in London, the eldest of seven sons of Edward Ryland (died 1771), an engraver and copper-plate printer. He studied engraving under Ravenet in London, and, in Paris, drawing under François Boucher and engraving under Jacques-Philippe Le Bas. After spending five years on the continent he returned to England, and having engraved portraits of George III and Lord Bute (after Ramsay), and a portrait of Queen Charlotte and the Princess Royal after Francis Cotes RA, he was appointed engraver to the king, a position that carried a salary of £200 per annum.

In 1766 he became a member of the Incorporated Society of Artists, and he exhibited with them and in the Royal Academy. In his later life Ryland abandoned line engraving, and introduced chalk-engraving, in which the line is composed of stippled dots, and in which he transcribed Mortimer's "King John Signing Magna Carta", and copied the drawings of the Old Masters and the works of Angelica Kauffman.

Ryland became prosperous, and seeking an investment, went into partnership with a pupil, Henry Bryer, putting his money into a print shop in Cornhill, London; the business went bankrupt in December 1771. After an interval, he resumed business as a print-seller in the Strand, but before long retired to a private residence at Knightsbridge.

== Arrest and execution ==
By 1783 Ryland was suspected of involvement in forgery. He disappeared from his home on 1 April 1783. An advertisement was issued offering a reward for his apprehension, on a charge of forging and uttering two bills of exchange for £714 with intent to defraud the East India Company. On the arrival of officers to arrest him in a small house near Stepney, he made a desperate suicide attempt by cutting his own throat. On 27 July he was tried at the Old Bailey before Sir Francis Buller.

Suspicion had been raised when two bills had been found with the same number, however there was no evidence from the engravings as to which was the real bill and which the forgery. Only the evidence of the paper manufacturer, that the paper upon which Ryland's bill was printed had not been sold until after the date of the bill resulted in his being convicted, and sentenced to death. He was hanged at Tyburn on 29 August 1783, and buried at St Dunstan's Church in Feltham Middlesex. According to Walford, " It is worthy of record that the last criminal executed here was one Ryland, who was hanged for forgery in 1783; after which the gallows were taken down about London in order to concentrate the executions at Newgate and Horsemonger Lane".

An aged William Blake recounted an anecdote in which he supposedly predicted, twelve years before the fact, that Ryland would be hanged. Blake was set to be apprenticed to Ryland, but opted for James Basire instead. According to the story, he justified his dislike of Ryland by declaring: "I do not like the man's face: it looks as if he will live to be hanged!"

He left a widow and six children. His widow kept a print-shop for many years in Oxford Road, and his daughter became a teacher of drawing, and instructed the Princess Elizabeth and others of the royal family. One of Ryland's brothers was, in 1762, convicted of highway robbery, committed in a drunken frolic, and was reprieved only on the morning of the day of execution through his brother's personal influence with the king.
