= Lizinska de Mirbel =

French miniaturist (1796–1849)

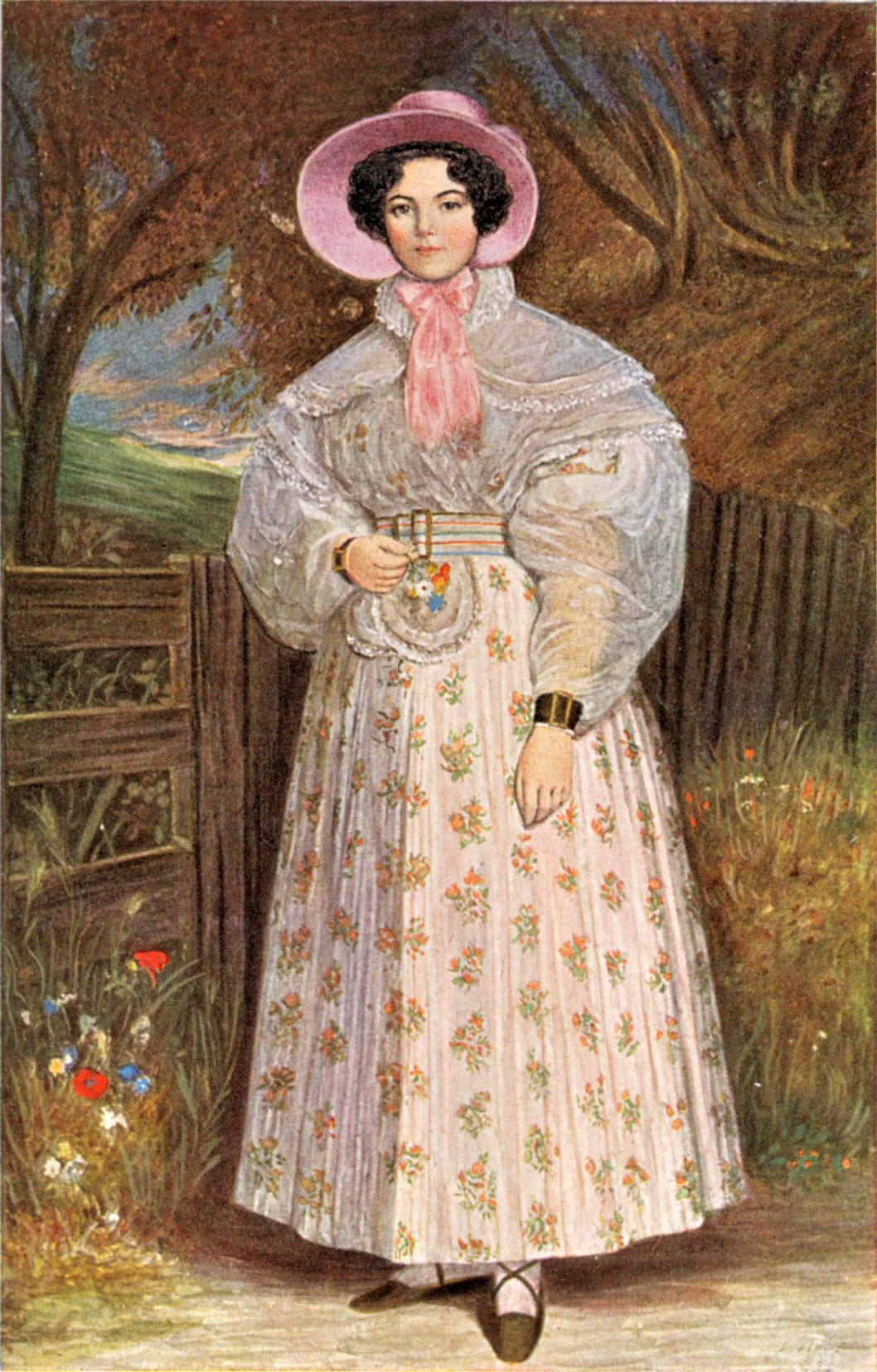
- Madame de Mirbel, by Charles-Émile-Callande de Champmartin
- Born: Lizinska Aimée Zoé de Rue; 26 July 1796; Cherbourg, France
- Died: 29 August 1849 (aged 53); Paris, France
- Occupation: Miniaturist

Lizinska de Mirbel (26 July 1796 – 29 August 1849) was a French painter of miniature portraits. She was very fashionable among the aristocracy of Paris during the Bourbon Restoration and the July Monarchy.

== Early years ==
Lizinca-Aimée-Zoé Rue was born in Cherbourg on 8 Thermidor year IV (26 July 1796). Her father was Gilles-Marie-Georges Rue, controller of the navy. Her mother was Eulalie-Zoé Bailly de Monthion, sister of General François Gédéon Bailly de Monthion (1776–1850). Her relatives were all wealthy, apart from her father. She spent her early childhood in Cherbourg, then moved to Sas van Gent during the Consulate when her father was reduced in rank to deputy commissioner of registration there. Around 1806, after her father had been dismissed from the navy, Lizinca moved to Paris to stay with her uncle, General de Monthion. Her father suffered from a disease of the brain, and ended his life in a hospital. General de Monthion tried to give Lizinca an excellent education.

== Studies ==
Lizinca chose painting as a way to earn a living. She decided to specialise in miniatures, which were less messy than larger oil paintings. At the age of 18 she enrolled as a pupil of Jean-Baptiste Jacques Augustin. Augustin taught her the technical skills of miniature painting, and she then followed the advice of a family friend, M. Belloc, and left the studio to devote herself to learning to draw by copying the masters. Her first commercial effort was a miniature of a niece of M. Rousseau, then one of the mayors of Paris and later a Peer of France. She made a number of other practice miniatures before making her first portraits. These included President Amy, King Louis XVIII, the Duke of Fitz-James, and Perronet, the king's valet. The portraits of President Amy and Perronet are among her masterpieces.

== Success ==
Lizinca made her studies of the king during several breakfasts, where she had to stand at all times, close enough to study the face but not so close as to disturb him. The painting was a success, and the king took an interest in her as a sensible and witty but modest woman. Lizinca became one of the nominal mistresses of Louis XVIII, who had been widowed since 1810 and followed convention by always having an official mistress. As with the other women, the relationship was not sexual. The king's true interest was in a few men whose fortunes he had made.

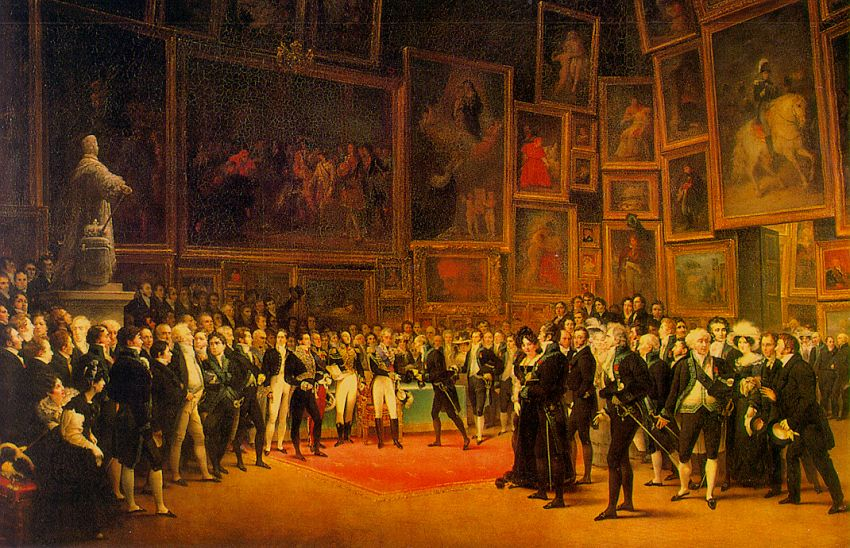
Charles X Distributing Awards to Artists at the Salon of 1824. Lizinska de Mirbel is in the foreground, at the edge of the red carpet, facing the viewer.

The king helped to find a husband for Lizinca, and she accepted his choice. She married Charles François Brisseau de Mirbel on 18 May 1824. He was born on 27 March 1776, was 48 years old when they married and had been a widower for 13 years. He was a member of the Académie des Sciences and a knight of the Legion of Honour. He was a professor of botany at the Jardin des plantes. The government gave the Mirbels a small apartment on the third floor of a house near the Carrousel. James Fenimore Cooper visited Lizinca there in 1827. He noted that he had to climb up a narrow, steep and winding set of stairs, and observed that "M. de [Mirbel] is a man of talents and great respectability, and his wife is exceedingly clever, but they are not rich. He is a professor, and she is an artist." Cooper wrote,

The door opens, and I enter. The little drawing-room is crowded; chiefly with men. Two card tables are set, and at one I recognize a party, in which are three dukes of the vieille cour, with M. de Duras at their head! The rest of the company was a little more mixed, but, on the whole, it savoured strongly of Coblentz and the émigration. This was more truly French than any thing I had yet stumbled on. One or two of the grandees looked at me as if, better informed than Scott, they knew that General La Fayette had not gone to America to live. Some of these gentlemen certainly do not love us; but I had cut out too much work for the night to stay and return the big looks of even dukes, and, watching an opportunity, when the eyes of Madame de [Mirbel] were another way, I stole out of the room.

From this time Lizinca de Mirbel became much in demand by the Paris élite due to the king's favour. She was house painter to Louis XVIII and his successor Charles X. She won a second class medal at the 1822 Exposition. She was awarded the first class gold medal at the Paris Salon of 1827 for her miniatures and watercolors. Her work won awards in all the subsequent exhibitions apart from those of 1836, 1838 and 1843. She competed at the 1849 exhibition, where she won a second class medal. Some of her portraits exhibited at different shows included those of King Charles X, the Duke of Fitz-James (1827), Élie, duc Decazes, the Princess of Chalais, Count Demidoff (1834), Louis-Philippe, Louise of Orléans, the Duke of Orleans, the Count of Paris, Fanny Elssler (1839), General Gourgaud (1841), François Guizot (1844), the Duchess of Treviso (1845), the Marshal de Reggio (1847) and Émile de Girardin (1848).

Lizinca de Mirbel was particularly known for her portraits of elderly men and women. Pierre Paul Emmanuel de Pommayrac was one of her pupils. She died of cholera on 30 August 1849 during an epidemic.

== Sources ==
- Augustin, Jal A (1872), "MIRBEL (Lizinka -Aimée – Zoé RUE, Mad de). 1796-1849", Dictionnaire critique de biographie et d'histoire (in French)
- Cooper, James Fenimore (1983), Gleanings in Europe: France, SUNY Press, ISBN 978-0-87395-368-9
- Dag'Naud, Alain (2012-11-21), Le grand bêtisier de l'Histoire de France (in French), Larousse, ISBN 978-2-03-589355-0
- "Lizinska de Mirbel (1796-1849) French artist", LiveAuctioneers
- "Necrology", The American Art Review, Dana Estes and C.E. Lauriat, 1880
- Véru'smor (1850), "Mme DE MIRBEL", Annuaire du Département de la Manche (in French), 22
