= Bayon, Meurthe-et-Moselle =

Bayon
- Commune
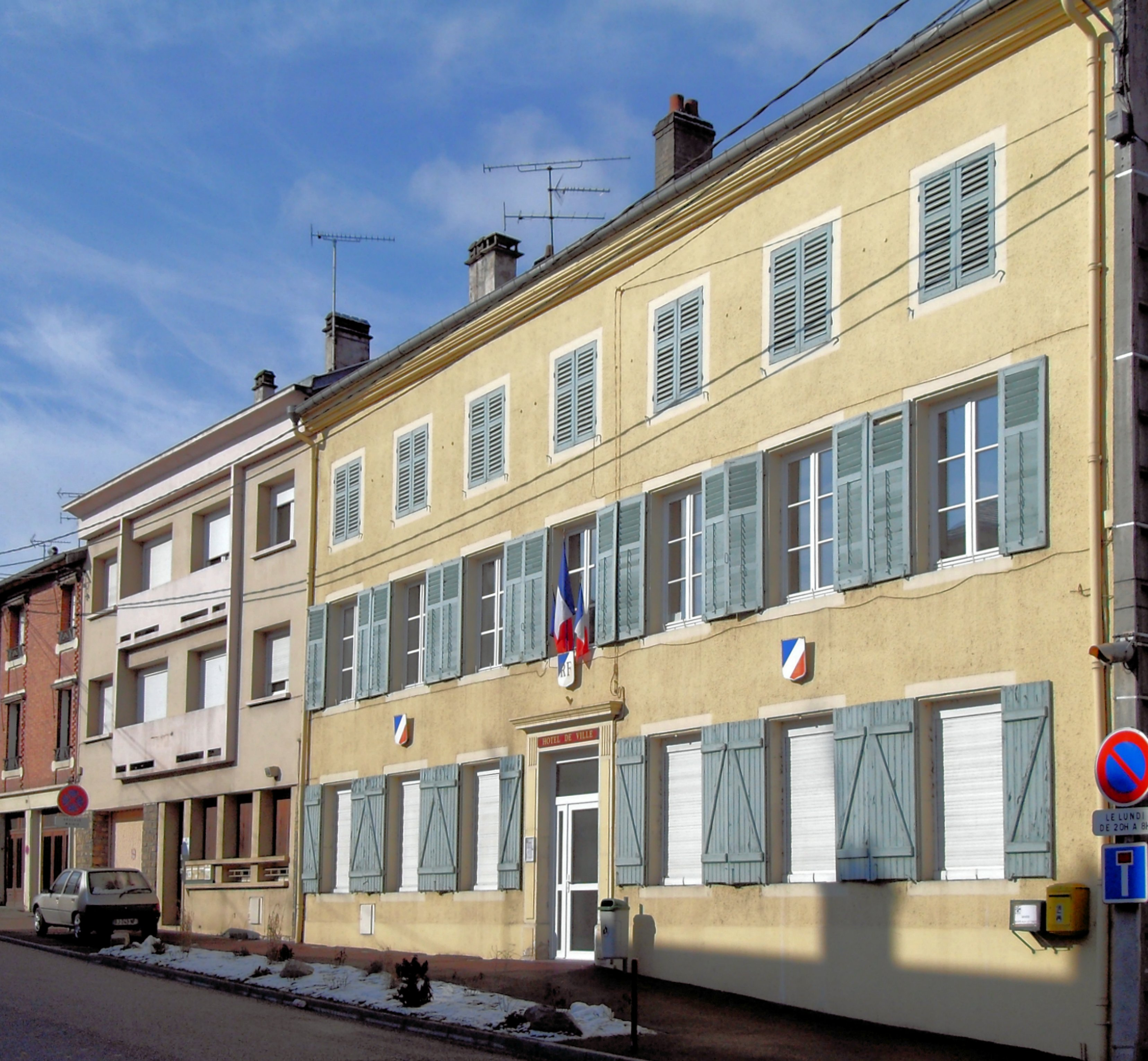
- The town hall in Bayon

- Coat of arms
- Location of Bayon
- Location within France Location within Grand Est
- Coordinates: 48°28′32″N 6°18′57″E
- Country: France
- Region: Grand Est
- Department: Meurthe-et-Moselle
- Arrondissement: Lunéville
- Canton: Lunéville-2
- Intercommunality: Meurthe, Mortagne, Moselle

Government
  - Mayor (2020–2026): Nicole Charrois-Tarillon
- Area^{1}: 6.05 km^{2} (2.34 sq mi)
- Elevation: 267 m (876 ft)
- Highest elevation: 397 m (1,302 ft)
- Lowest elevation: 242 m (794 ft)
- Population (2023): 1,561
  - Density: 258/km^{2} (668/sq mi)
- Time zone: UTC+01:00 (CET)
  - Summer (DST): UTC+02:00 (CEST)
- INSEE/Postal code: 54054 /54290
- ^{1} French Land Register data, which excludes lakes, ponds, glaciers > 1 km^{2} (0.386 sq mi or 247 acres) and river estuaries.

Bayon (French pronunciation: [bajɔ̃]) is a commune in the Meurthe-et-Moselle department in northeastern France. Bayon has been twinned with Straelen in Germany, since 7 July 1963.

== Population ==
Historical population
Year	Pop.	±% p.a.
1968	1,421	—
1975	1,515	+0.92%
1982	1,530	+0.14%
1990	1,464	−0.55%
1999	1,404	−0.46%
2007	1,444	+0.35%
2012	1,637	+2.54%
2017	1,610	−0.33%
2023	1,561	−0.51%
Source: INSEE

== See also ==
- Communes of the Meurthe-et-Moselle department
