= Jean Girardet =

French painter (1709–1778)

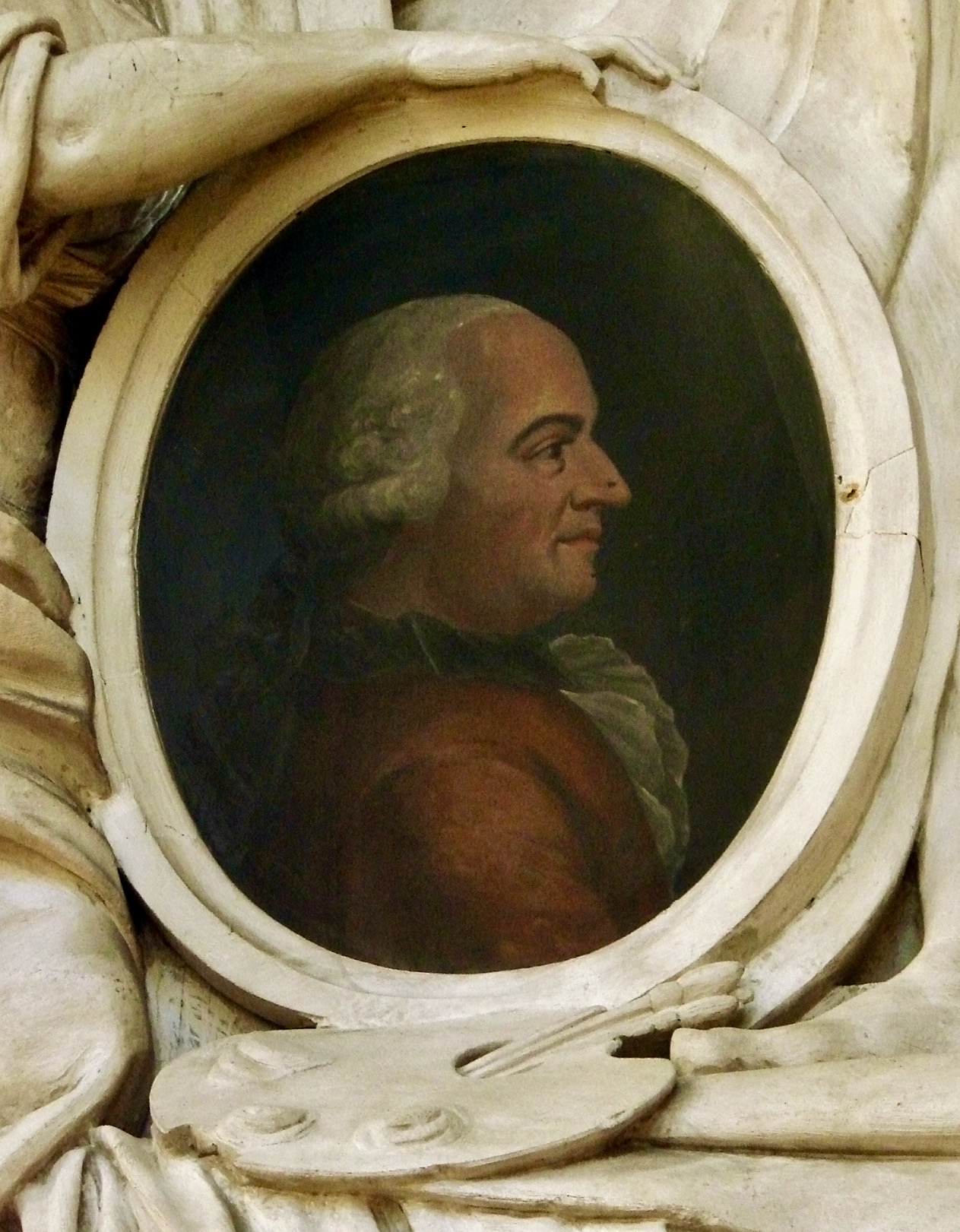
Portrait of Jean Girardet on his tomb at Saint Sebastien Church

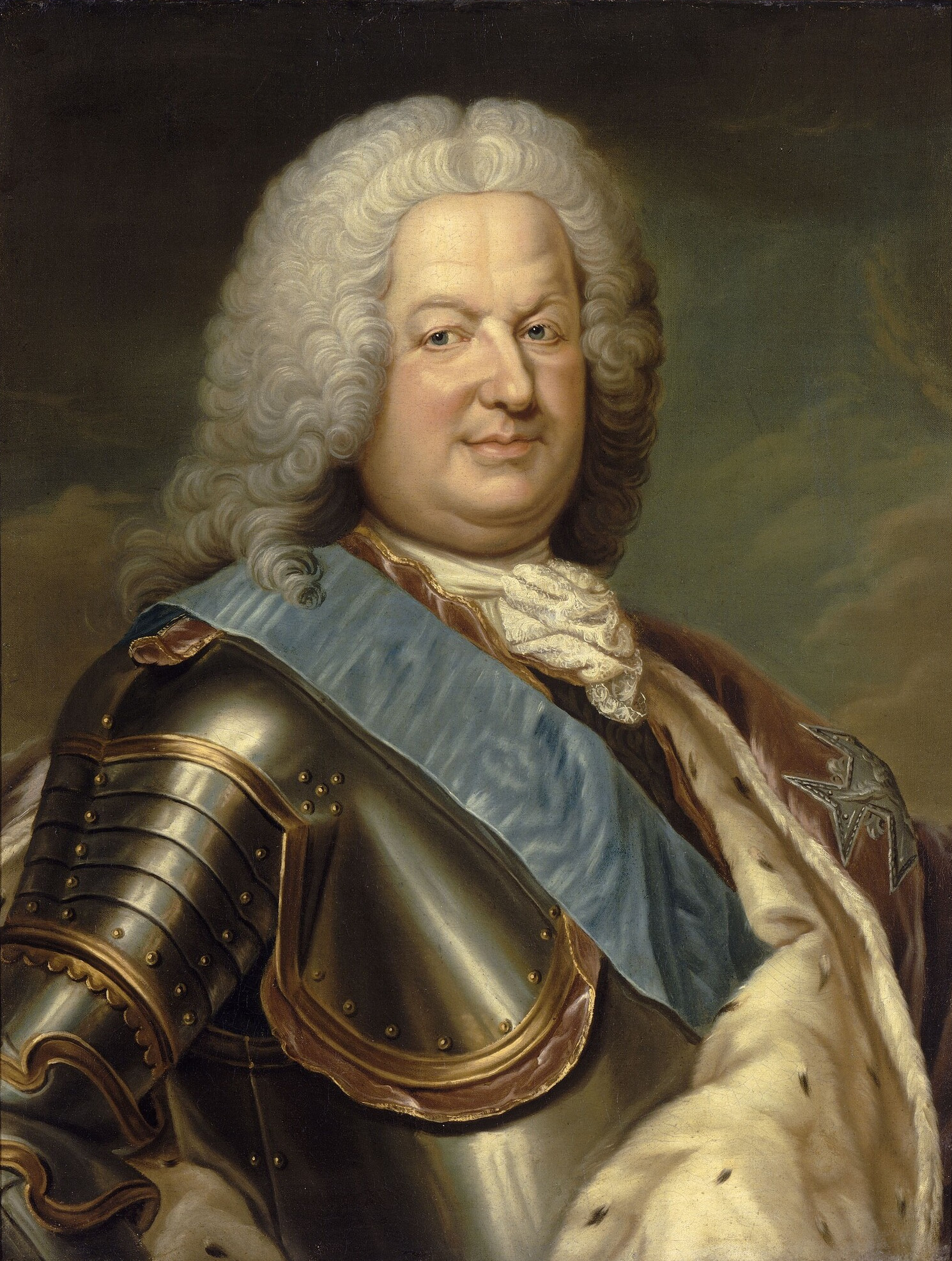
Portrait of Stanislas Leszczynski (date unknown)

Jean Girardet (1709 – 28 September 1778) was a French portrait and mural painter.

== Biography ==
Girardet was born at Lunéville. Before becoming a painter he was, successively, a seminarian, a law student, and a cavalry officer. After settling on art, he enrolled at the Nancy-Université, where he studied under the direction of Claude Charles. He created several large decorative works before leaving in 1738, to join the entourage of the new Duke of Tuscany, Francis II, and travelled with him as far as Florence, where he completed his studies.

He worked for Duchess Élisabeth Charlotte d'Orléans in Commercy, until her death in 1744. After another stay in Florence, he returned home in 1748, to enter the service of Stanisław Leszczyński, Duke of Lorraine and former King of Poland, as a court painter. His talent for portrait painting earned him the title of "Ordinary Painter to the King of Poland" in 1758. He would create portraits of all the nobility of Lorraine, including several of Leszczyński.

He also excelled in large decorative and religious murals; working at several churches in Lunéville, Chanteheux, Commercy, Verdun and Metz, as well as at Toul Cathedral, where he created a mural dedicated to the Sacred Heart. Many of his smaller works have since disappeared. He also provided decorations for the Nancy City Hall, which was built from 1752 to 1755. These include a large ceiling mural, depicting Leszczyński as Phoebus, the god of light.

In the absence of a local art academy, he took students at his studio and workshops. Eventually, over 140 local artists would study with him.

After the death of Leszczyński in 1766, he was taken into service by the Duke's only surviving daughter, Marie Leszczyńska, the Queen of France. He remained at Versailles for a short time after her death in 1768, then returned to Nancy, where he died, ten years later.

He was interred at Saint Sebastien Church. His original tomb was adorned with a stele and a portrait, created by Johann Joseph Söntgen. In 1792, it was destroyed by Federated troops passing through Nancy. In 1801 a group of local artists built a new memorial, with sculptures by Joseph Labroise. A street has been named after him in Lunéville.
