= Jean-Charles François =

French engraver

Jean-Charles Francois
- Born: 4 May 1717; Nancy, Duchy of Lorraine
- Died: 22 March 1769 (aged 51); Paris, France

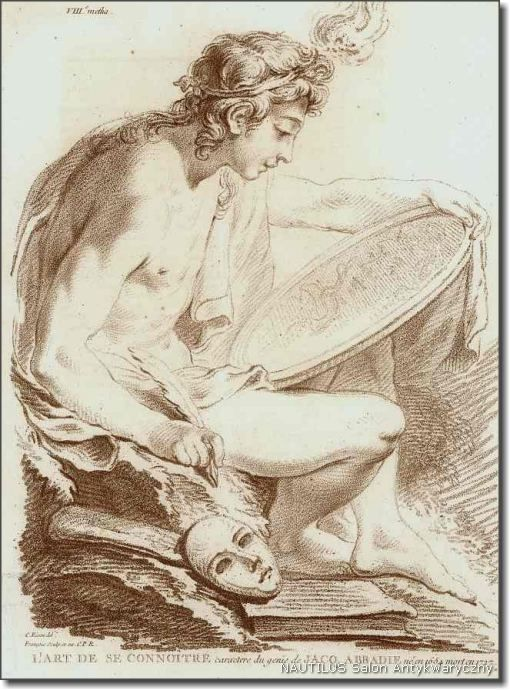
The personification of self-discovery by Jean-Charles François, 1760

Jean-Charles François (4 May 1717 – 22 March 1769) was a French engraver.

François was born in Nancy then in the Duchy of Lorraine. He was among the pioneers of the so-called "manière de crayon" ("crayon manner") of printmaking, which simulated the appearance of crayon and chalk drawings. He was pensioned by King Louis XV, who employed him extensively. His most noted works represent Louis XV, Marie Leszczyńska, Pierre Bayle, Erasmus, John Locke, and Nicolas Malebranche.

He died in 1769 in Paris, aged 51.
