= Remoncourt =

Remoncourt may refer to the following places in France:

- Remoncourt, Meurthe-et-Moselle, a commune in the Meurthe-et-Moselle department
- Remoncourt, Vosges, a commune in the Vosges department
