= Remoncourt, Meurthe-et-Moselle =

Remoncourt
- Commune
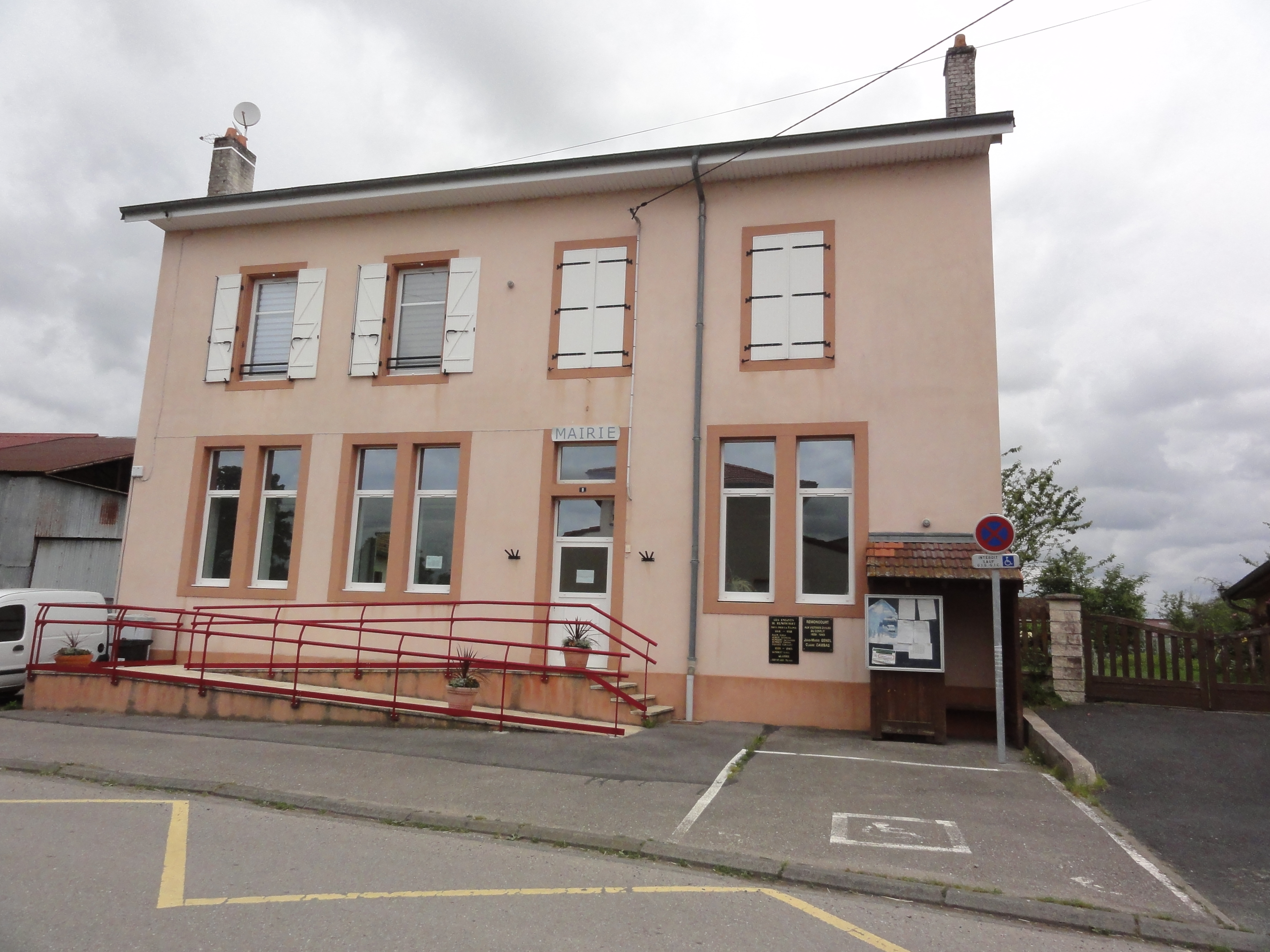
- The town hall in Remoncourt

- Coat of arms
- Location of Remoncourt
- Location within France Location within Grand Est
- Coordinates: 48°39′36″N 6°44′14″E
- Country: France
- Region: Grand Est
- Department: Meurthe-et-Moselle
- Arrondissement: Lunéville
- Canton: Baccarat
- Intercommunality: Vezouze en Piémont

Government
  - Mayor (2020–2026): Stève Jouquelet
- Area^{1}: 6.68 km^{2} (2.58 sq mi)
- Elevation: 250 m (820 ft)
- Highest elevation: 283 m (928 ft)
- Lowest elevation: 237 m (778 ft)
- Population (2023): 39
  - Density: 5.8/km^{2} (15/sq mi)
- Time zone: UTC+01:00 (CET)
  - Summer (DST): UTC+02:00 (CEST)
- INSEE/Postal code: 54457 /54370
- ^{1} French Land Register data, which excludes lakes, ponds, glaciers > 1 km^{2} (0.386 sq mi or 247 acres) and river estuaries.

Remoncourt (French pronunciation: [ʁəmɔ̃kuʁ]) is a commune in the Meurthe-et-Moselle department in northeastern France.

The village population is 36. Its elevation is 250 metres; its area is 6.7 km^{2}.

The nearest village is Xousse, located 2.3 km to the west. Remoncourt is administered from Nancy, 62 km to the west.

== See also ==
- Communes of the Meurthe-et-Moselle department
