= Xousse =

- Commune
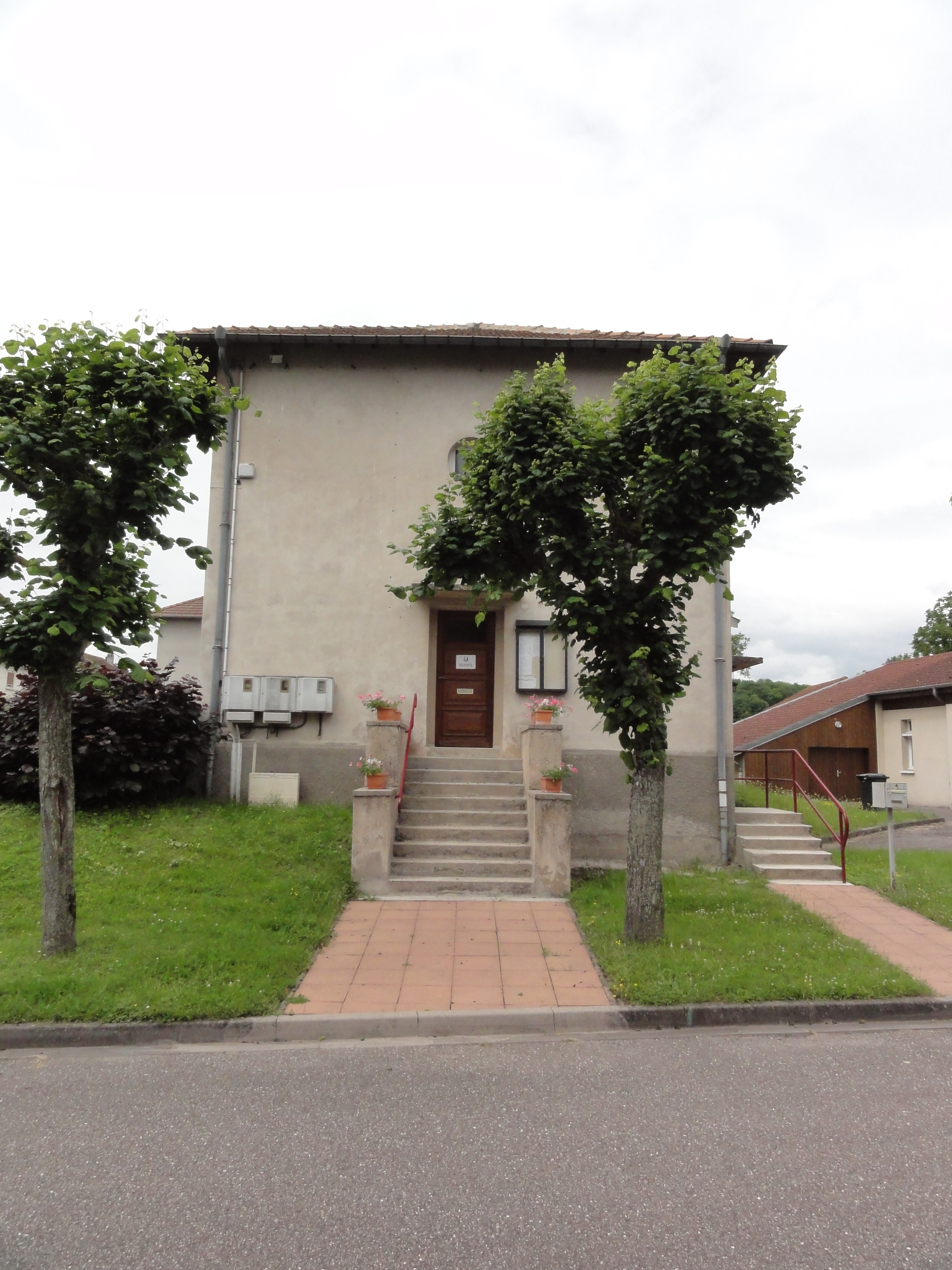
- The town hall in Xousse

- Coat of arms
- Location of Xousse
- Location within France Location within Grand Est
- Coordinates: 48°39′28″N 6°42′37″E
- Country: France
- Region: Grand Est
- Department: Meurthe-et-Moselle
- Arrondissement: Lunéville
- Canton: Baccarat
- Intercommunality: Vezouze en Piémont

Government
  - Mayor (2020–2026): Gérard Doyen
- Area^{1}: 6.13 km^{2} (2.37 sq mi)
- Elevation: 252 m (827 ft)
- Highest elevation: 306 m (1,004 ft)
- Lowest elevation: 236 m (774 ft)
- Population (2023): 115
  - Density: 18.8/km^{2} (48.6/sq mi)
- Time zone: UTC+01:00 (CET)
  - Summer (DST): UTC+02:00 (CEST)
- INSEE/Postal code: 54600 /54370
- ^{1} French Land Register data, which excludes lakes, ponds, glaciers > 1 km^{2} (0.386 sq mi or 247 acres) and river estuaries.

Xousse is a commune in the Meurthe-et-Moselle department in north-eastern France.

== Population ==
Historical population
Year	Pop.	±% p.a.
1968	166	—
1975	164	−0.17%
1982	140	−2.23%
1990	130	−0.92%
1999	113	−1.55%
2007	113	+0.00%
2012	122	+1.54%
2017	127	+0.81%
2023	115	−1.64%
Source: INSEE

== See also ==
- Communes of the Meurthe-et-Moselle department
