= Canton of Colombey-les-Belles =

Former canton in Meurthe-et-Moselle, France

Coordinates: 48°31′09″N 5°51′31″E

- Former canton
- Location of the canton in the arrondissement of Toul
- Country: France
- Region: Grand Est
- Department: Meurthe-et-Moselle
- No. of communes: {{{nbcomm}}}
- Disbanded: 2015

Government
  - Representatives: Agnès Marchand
- Area: 298.89 km^{2} (115.40 sq mi)
- Population (2012): 8,035
  - Density: 26.88/km^{2} (69.63/sq mi)

The canton of Colombey-les-Belles (French: Canton de Colombey-les-Belles) is a former French canton located in the department of Meurthe-et-Moselle in the Lorraine region (now part of Grand Est). This canton was organized around Colombey-les-Belles in the arrondissement of Toul. It is now part of the canton of Meine au Saintois.

The last general councillor from this canton was Agnès Marchand (PS), elected in 2014.

== Composition ==
The canton of Colombey-les-Belles grouped together 31 municipalities and had 8,035 inhabitants (2012 census without double counts).

1. Aboncourt
2. Allain
3. Allamps
4. Bagneux
5. Barisey-au-Plain
6. Barisey-la-Côte
7. Battigny
8. Beuvezin
9. Colombey-les-Belles
10. Courcelles
11. Crépey
12. Dolcourt
13. Favières
14. Fécocourt
15. Gélaucourt
16. Gémonville
17. Germiny
18. Gibeaumeix
19. Grimonviller
20. Mont-l'Étroit
21. Pulney
22. Saulxerotte
23. Saulxures-lès-Vannes
24. Selaincourt
25. Thuilley-aux-Groseilles
26. Tramont-Émy
27. Tramont-Lassus
28. Tramont-Saint-André
29. Uruffe
30. Vandeléville
31. Vannes-le-Châtel
