= Blénod =

Blénod may refer to the following places in France:

- Blénod-lès-Pont-à-Mousson, Meurthe-et-Moselle
- Blénod-lès-Toul, Meurthe-et-Moselle
