= Favières =

Favières is the name of four communes in France:

- Favières, Eure-et-Loir
- Favières, Meurthe-et-Moselle
- Favières, Seine-et-Marne
- Favières, Somme
