= Vicherey =

- Commune
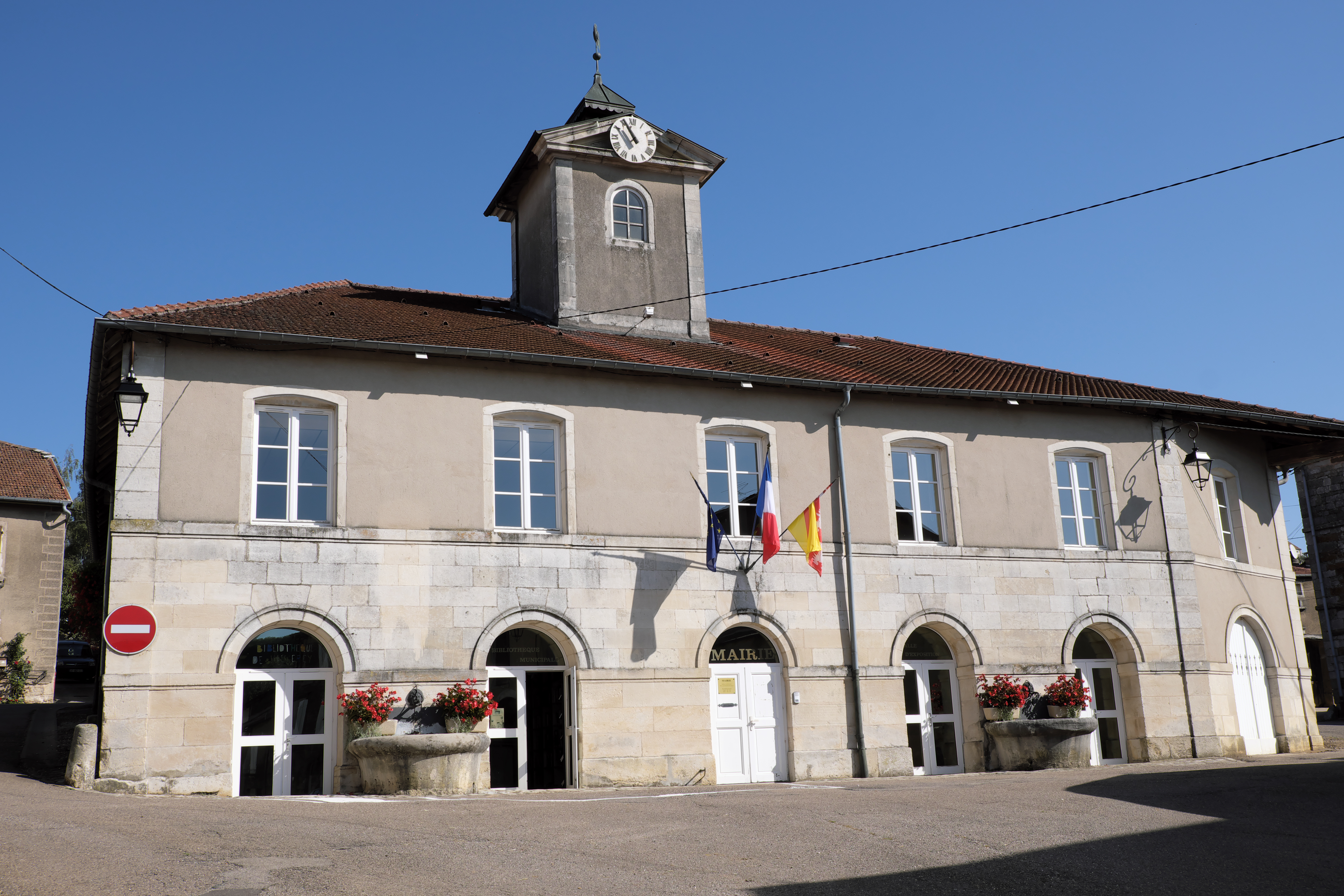
- The town hall in Vicherey

- Coat of arms
- Location of Vicherey
- Location within France Location within Grand Est
- Coordinates: 48°23′02″N 5°56′15″E
- Country: France
- Region: Grand Est
- Department: Vosges
- Arrondissement: Neufchâteau
- Canton: Mirecourt
- Intercommunality: CC Pays de Colombey et Sud Toulois

Government
  - Mayor (2020–2026): Alain Abscheidt
- Area^{1}: 5.88 km^{2} (2.27 sq mi)
- Elevation: 390 m (1,280 ft)
- Highest elevation: 463 m (1,519 ft)
- Lowest elevation: 356 m (1,168 ft)
- Population (2023): 154
  - Density: 26.2/km^{2} (67.8/sq mi)
- Time zone: UTC+01:00 (CET)
  - Summer (DST): UTC+02:00 (CEST)
- INSEE/Postal code: 88504 /88170
- ^{1} French Land Register data, which excludes lakes, ponds, glaciers > 1 km^{2} (0.386 sq mi or 247 acres) and river estuaries.

Vicherey (French pronunciation: [viʃʁɛ]) is a commune in the Vosges department in Grand Est in northeastern France.

== See also ==
- Communes of the Vosges department
