= Crézilles =

- Commune
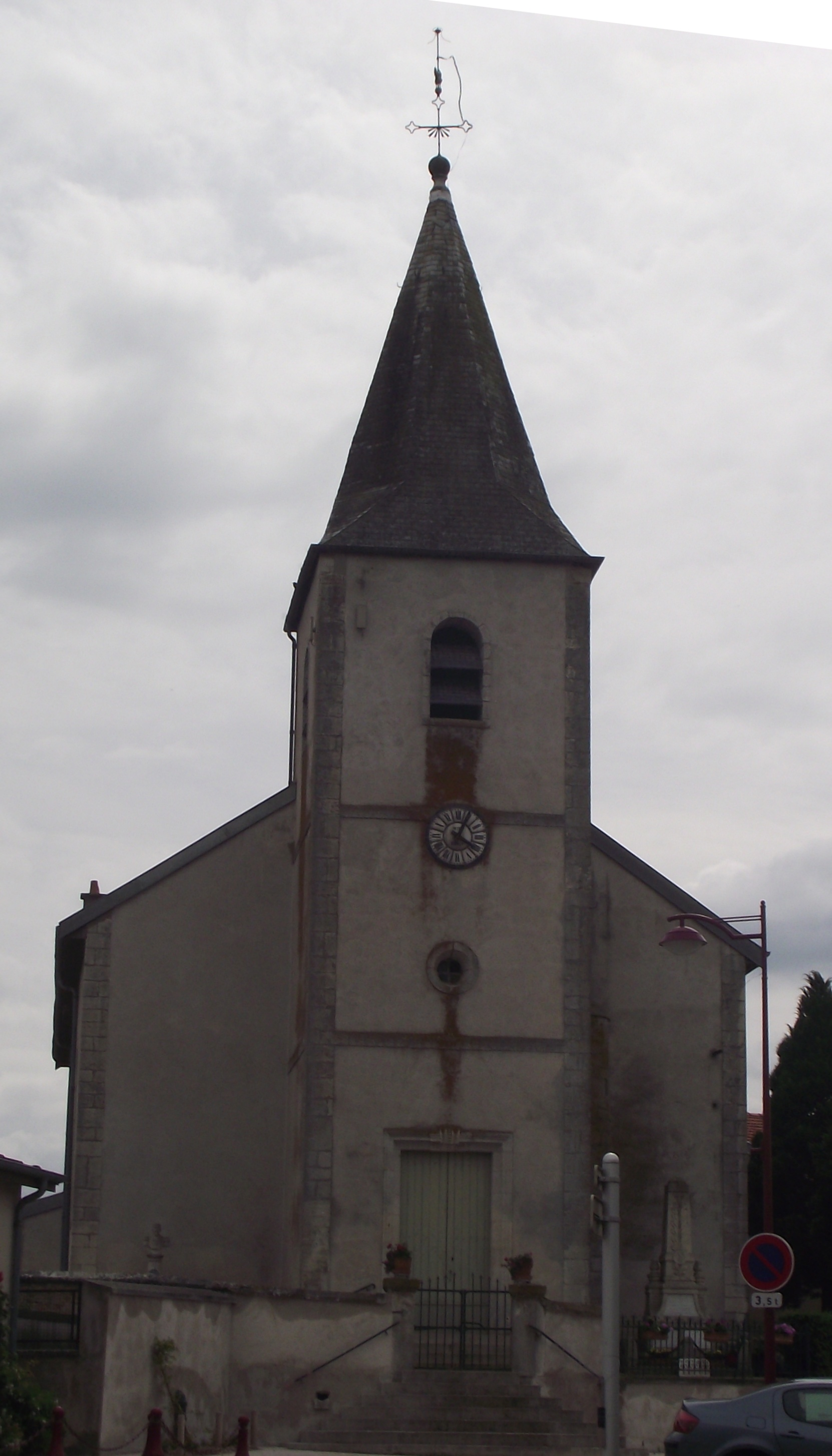
- The church in Crézilles

- Coat of arms
- Location of Crézilles
- Location within France Location within Grand Est
- Coordinates: 48°35′08″N 5°52′50″E
- Country: France
- Region: Grand Est
- Department: Meurthe-et-Moselle
- Arrondissement: Toul
- Canton: Meine au Saintois
- Intercommunality: CC Pays de Colombey et Sud Toulois

Government
  - Mayor (2020–2026): Patrick Aubry
- Area^{1}: 9.53 km^{2} (3.68 sq mi)
- Elevation: 270 m (890 ft)
- Highest elevation: 288 m (945 ft)
- Lowest elevation: 230 m (750 ft)
- Population (2023): 291
  - Density: 30.5/km^{2} (79.1/sq mi)
- Time zone: UTC+01:00 (CET)
  - Summer (DST): UTC+02:00 (CEST)
- INSEE/Postal code: 54146 /54113
- ^{1} French Land Register data, which excludes lakes, ponds, glaciers > 1 km^{2} (0.386 sq mi or 247 acres) and river estuaries.

Crézilles (French pronunciation: [kʁezij]) is a commune in the Meurthe-et-Moselle department in north-eastern France.

== See also ==
- Communes of the Meurthe-et-Moselle department
