= Moutrot =

- Commune
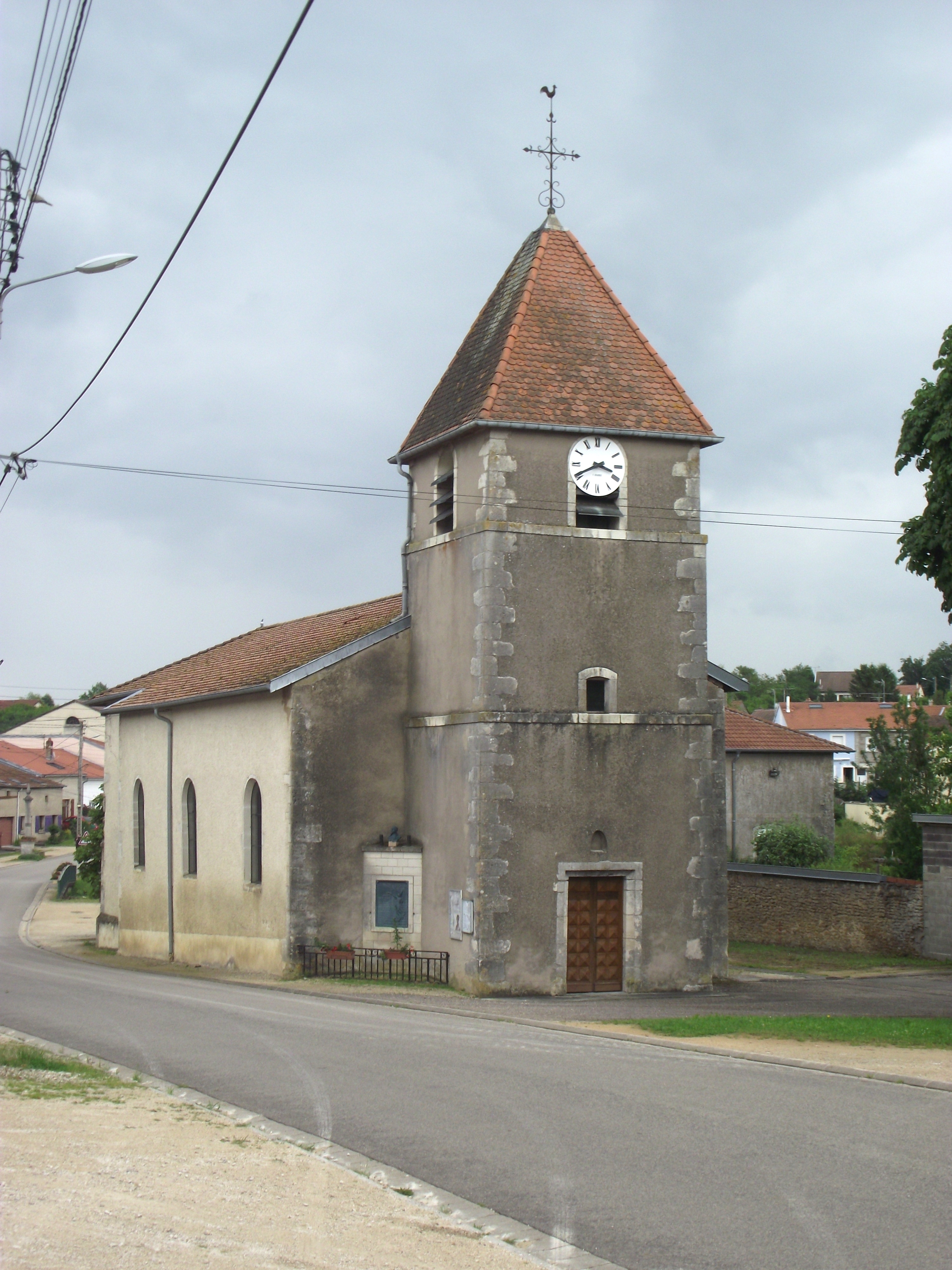
- The church in Moutrot

- Coat of arms
- Location of Moutrot
- Location within France Location within Grand Est
- Coordinates: 48°36′14″N 5°53′38″E
- Country: France
- Region: Grand Est
- Department: Meurthe-et-Moselle
- Arrondissement: Toul
- Canton: Meine au Saintois
- Intercommunality: CC Pays de Colombey et Sud Toulois

Government
  - Mayor (2020–2026): Charles Matos
- Area^{1}: 7.26 km^{2} (2.80 sq mi)
- Elevation: 225 m (738 ft)
- Highest elevation: 272 m (892 ft)
- Lowest elevation: 220 m (720 ft)
- Population (2023): 327
  - Density: 45.0/km^{2} (117/sq mi)
- Time zone: UTC+01:00 (CET)
  - Summer (DST): UTC+02:00 (CEST)
- INSEE/Postal code: 54392 /54113
- ^{1} French Land Register data, which excludes lakes, ponds, glaciers > 1 km^{2} (0.386 sq mi or 247 acres) and river estuaries.

Moutrot (French pronunciation: [mutʁo]) is a commune in the Meurthe-et-Moselle department in north-eastern France.

== See also ==
- Communes of the Meurthe-et-Moselle department
