= Communauté de communes du Pays de Colombey et du Sud Toulois =

Federation of municipalities in France

Pays de Colombey et Sud Toulois
- Communauté de communes
- Interactive map of Pays de Colombey et Sud Toulois
- Coordinates: 48°31′N 05°54′E
- Country: France
- Region: Grand Est
- Department: Meurthe-et-Moselle, Vosges
- No. of communes: {{{nbcomm}}}
- Established: 2000
- Area: 371.8 km^{2} (143.6 sq mi)
- Population (2019): 11,336
  - Density: 30.49/km^{2} (78.97/sq mi)
- Website: www.pays-colombey-sudtoulois.fr

The Communauté de communes du Pays de Colombey et du Sud Toulois is a French administrative association of communes in the Meurthe-et-Moselle and Vosges departments and in the region of Grand Est, northeastern France. Its seat is in Colombey-les-Belles. Its area is 371.8 km^{2}, and its population was 11,336 in 2019.

== Composition ==
The association comprises 38 communes, of which 37 are in Meurthe-et-Moselle and one (Vicherey) in Vosges:

- Aboncourt
- Allain
- Allamps
- Bagneux
- Barisey-au-Plain
- Barisey-la-Côte
- Battigny
- Beuvezin
- Blénod-lès-Toul
- Bulligny
- Colombey-les-Belles
- Courcelles
- Crépey
- Crézilles
- Dolcourt
- Favières
- Fécocourt
- Gélaucourt
- Gémonville
- Germiny
- Gibeaumeix
- Grimonviller
- Mont-l'Étroit
- Mont-le-Vignoble
- Moutrot
- Ochey
- Pulney
- Saulxerotte
- Saulxures-lès-Vannes
- Selaincourt
- Thuilley-aux-Groseilles
- Tramont-Émy
- Tramont-Lassus
- Tramont-Saint-André
- Uruffe
- Vandeléville
- Vannes-le-Châtel
- Vicherey
