= Barisey-au-Plain =

- Commune
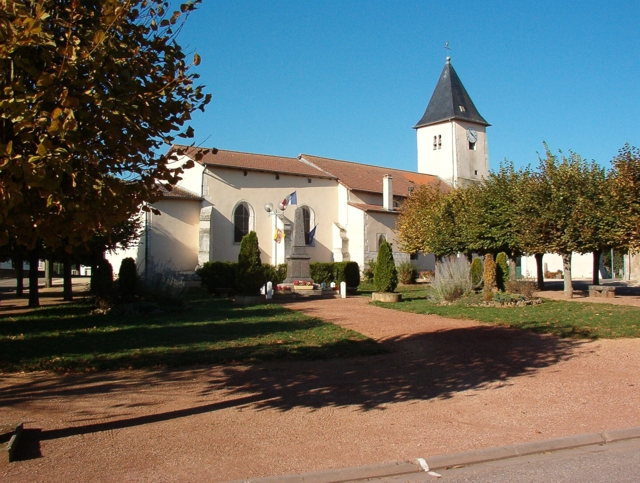
- The church in Barisey-au-Plain

- Coat of arms
- Location of Barisey-au-Plain
- Location within France Location within Grand Est
- Coordinates: 48°31′33″N 5°50′41″E
- Country: France
- Region: Grand Est
- Department: Meurthe-et-Moselle
- Arrondissement: Toul
- Canton: Meine au Saintois
- Intercommunality: CC Pays de Colombey et Sud Toulois

Government
  - Mayor (2020–2026): Jean-Marie Gerondi
- Area^{1}: 10.85 km^{2} (4.19 sq mi)
- Elevation: 279 m (915 ft)
- Highest elevation: 332 m (1,089 ft)
- Lowest elevation: 274 m (899 ft)
- Population (2023): 393
  - Density: 36.2/km^{2} (93.8/sq mi)
- Time zone: UTC+01:00 (CET)
  - Summer (DST): UTC+02:00 (CEST)
- INSEE/Postal code: 54046 /54170
- ^{1} French Land Register data, which excludes lakes, ponds, glaciers > 1 km^{2} (0.386 sq mi or 247 acres) and river estuaries.

Barisey-au-Plain (French pronunciation: [baʁizɛ o plɛ̃]) is a commune in the Meurthe-et-Moselle department in northeastern France.

== Population ==
Historical population
Year	Pop.	±% p.a.
1968	274	—
1975	256	−0.97%
1982	317	+3.10%
1990	304	−0.52%
1999	329	+0.88%
2007	307	−0.86%
2012	410	+5.96%
2017	399	−0.54%
2023	393	−0.25%
Source: INSEE

== See also ==
- Communes of the Meurthe-et-Moselle department
