= Allamps =

- Commune
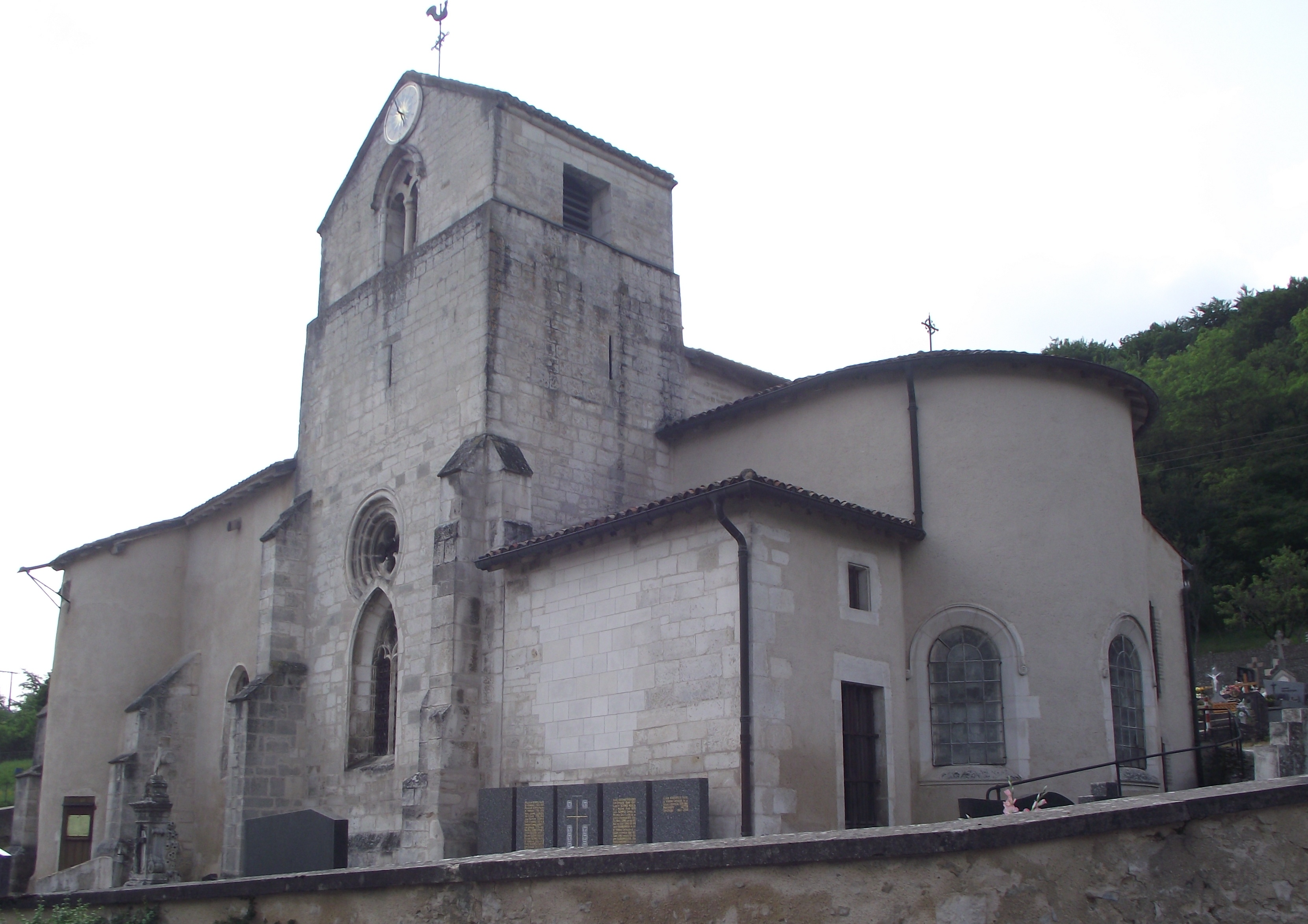
- The church in Allamps

- Coat of arms
- Location of Allamps
- Location within France Location within Grand Est
- Coordinates: 48°32′53″N 5°48′37″E
- Country: France
- Region: Grand Est
- Department: Meurthe-et-Moselle
- Arrondissement: Toul
- Canton: Meine au Saintois
- Intercommunality: Pays de Colombey et Sud Toulois

Government
  - Mayor (2023–2026): Denis Vallance
- Area^{1}: 7.21 km^{2} (2.78 sq mi)
- Elevation: 325 m (1,066 ft)
- Highest elevation: 422 m (1,385 ft)
- Lowest elevation: 270 m (890 ft)
- Population (2023): 505
  - Density: 70.0/km^{2} (181/sq mi)
- Time zone: UTC+01:00 (CET)
  - Summer (DST): UTC+02:00 (CEST)
- INSEE/Postal code: 54010 /54112
- ^{1} French Land Register data, which excludes lakes, ponds, glaciers > 1 km^{2} (0.386 sq mi or 247 acres) and river estuaries.

Allamps (French pronunciation: [alɑ̃]) is a commune in the Meurthe-et-Moselle department in northeastern France.

== Population ==
Historical population
Year	Pop.	±% p.a.
1968	506	—
1975	434	−2.17%
1982	438	+0.13%
1990	515	+2.04%
1999	511	−0.09%
2007	518	+0.17%
2012	524	+0.23%
2017	510	−0.54%
2023	505	−0.16%
Source: INSEE

== See also ==
- Communes of the Meurthe-et-Moselle department
