= Vannes-le-Châtel =

- Commune
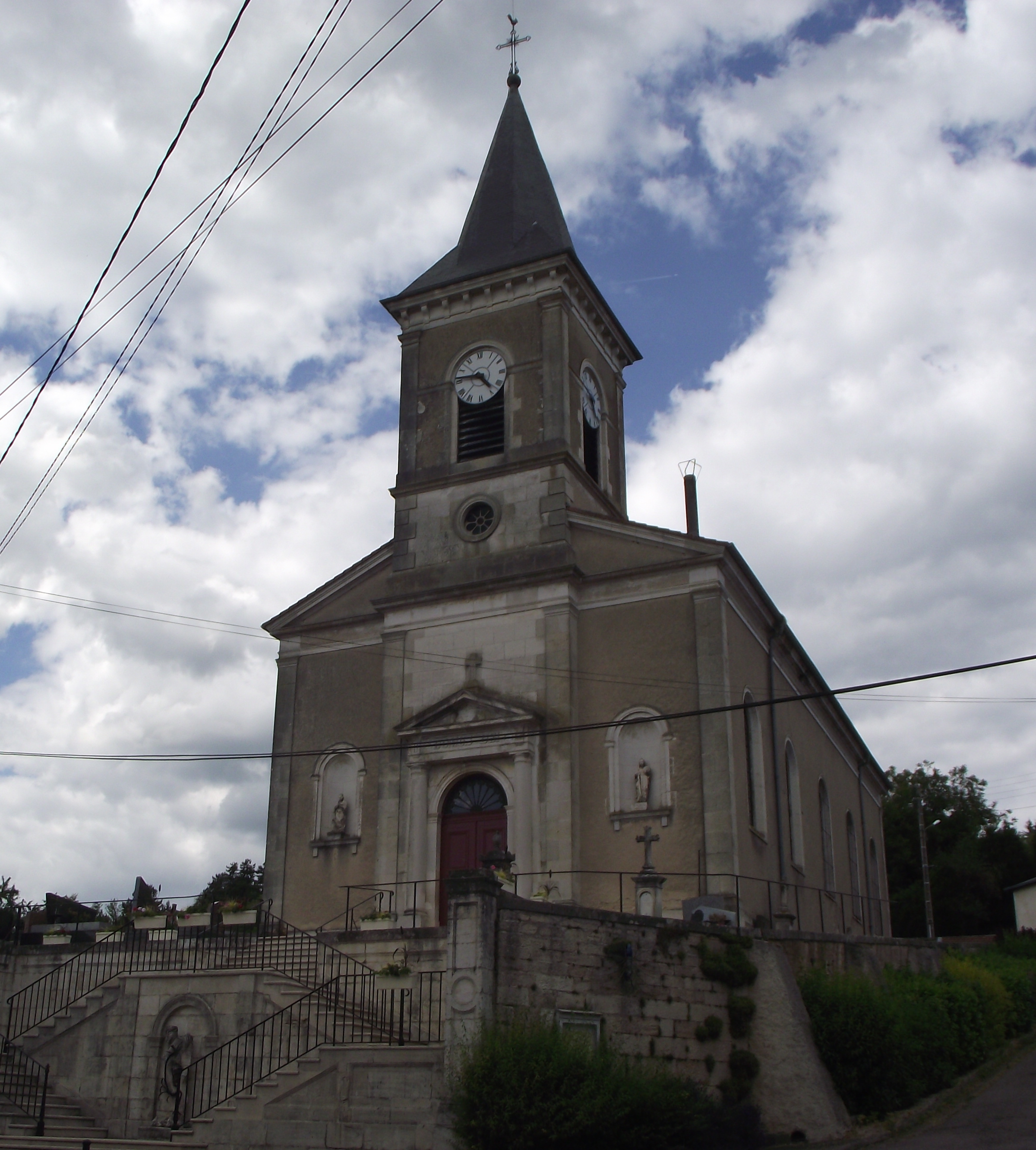
- The church in Vannes-le-Châtel

- Coat of arms
- Location of Vannes-le-Châtel
- Location within France Location within Grand Est
- Coordinates: 48°32′48″N 5°46′49″E
- Country: France
- Region: Grand Est
- Department: Meurthe-et-Moselle
- Arrondissement: Toul
- Canton: Meine au Saintois
- Intercommunality: CC Pays de Colombey et Sud Toulois

Government
  - Mayor (2020–2026): Nathalie Aufrere
- Area^{1}: 17.3 km^{2} (6.7 sq mi)
- Elevation: 290 m (950 ft)
- Highest elevation: 432 m (1,417 ft)
- Lowest elevation: 267 m (876 ft)
- Population (2023): 506
  - Density: 29.2/km^{2} (75.8/sq mi)
- Time zone: UTC+01:00 (CET)
  - Summer (DST): UTC+02:00 (CEST)
- INSEE/Postal code: 54548 /54112
- ^{1} French Land Register data, which excludes lakes, ponds, glaciers > 1 km^{2} (0.386 sq mi or 247 acres) and river estuaries.

Vannes-le-Châtel (French pronunciation: [van lə ʃatɛl]) is a commune in the Meurthe-et-Moselle department in north-eastern France.

== Population ==
Historical population
Year	Pop.	±% p.a.
1968	582	—
1975	512	−1.81%
1982	563	+1.37%
1990	519	−1.01%
1999	515	−0.09%
2007	564	+1.14%
2012	581	+0.60%
2017	569	−0.42%
2023	506	−1.94%
Source: INSEE

== See also ==
- Communes of the Meurthe-et-Moselle department
