= Pulney =

- Commune
- Coat of arms
- Location of Pulney
- Location within France Location within Grand Est
- Coordinates: 48°23′57″N 6°02′04″E
- Country: France
- Region: Grand Est
- Department: Meurthe-et-Moselle
- Arrondissement: Toul
- Canton: Meine au Saintois
- Intercommunality: CC Pays de Colombey et Sud Toulois

Government
  - Mayor (2020–2026): Jean-François Dezavelle
- Area^{1}: 4.4 km^{2} (1.7 sq mi)
- Elevation: 364 m (1,194 ft)
- Highest elevation: 510 m (1,670 ft)
- Lowest elevation: 319 m (1,047 ft)
- Population (2023): 54
  - Density: 12/km^{2} (32/sq mi)
- Time zone: UTC+01:00 (CET)
  - Summer (DST): UTC+02:00 (CEST)
- INSEE/Postal code: 54438 /54115
- ^{1} French Land Register data, which excludes lakes, ponds, glaciers > 1 km^{2} (0.386 sq mi or 247 acres) and river estuaries.

Pulney (French pronunciation: [pylnɛ]) is a commune in the Meurthe-et-Moselle department in north-eastern France.

== See also ==
- Communes of the Meurthe-et-Moselle department
