= Tramont-Saint-André =

- Commune
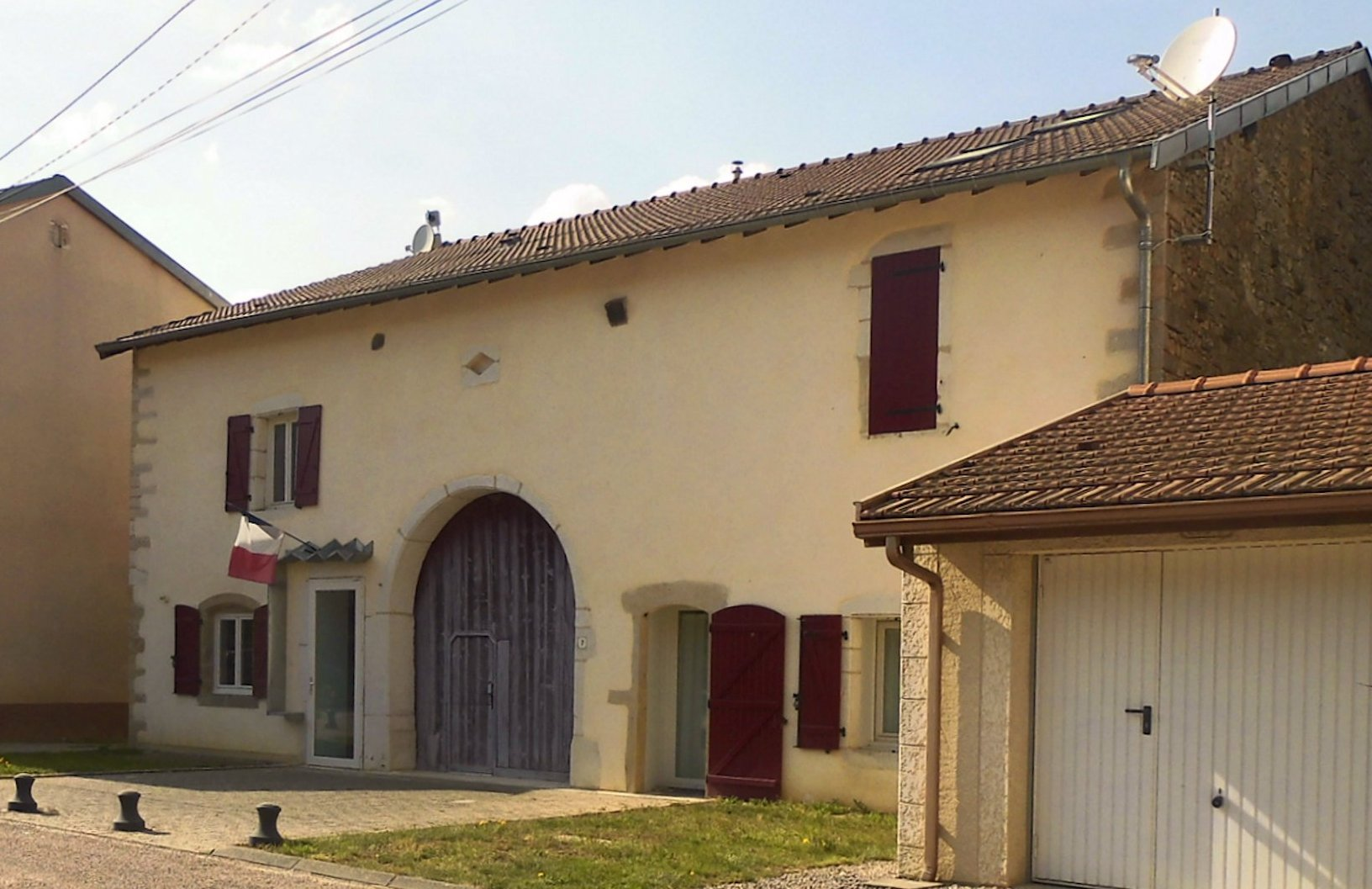
- The town hall in Tramont-Saint-André

- Coat of arms
- Location of Tramont-Saint-André
- Location within France Location within Grand Est
- Coordinates: 48°24′29″N 5°55′33″E
- Country: France
- Region: Grand Est
- Department: Meurthe-et-Moselle
- Arrondissement: Toul
- Canton: Meine au Saintois
- Intercommunality: CC Pays de Colombey et Sud Toulois

Government
  - Mayor (2020–2026): Cyril Sanders
- Area^{1}: 6.88 km^{2} (2.66 sq mi)
- Elevation: 360 m (1,180 ft)
- Highest elevation: 466 m (1,529 ft)
- Lowest elevation: 352 m (1,155 ft)
- Population (2023): 62
  - Density: 9.0/km^{2} (23/sq mi)
- Time zone: UTC+01:00 (CET)
  - Summer (DST): UTC+02:00 (CEST)
- INSEE/Postal code: 54531 /54115
- ^{1} French Land Register data, which excludes lakes, ponds, glaciers > 1 km^{2} (0.386 sq mi or 247 acres) and river estuaries.

Tramont-Saint-André (French pronunciation: [tʁamɔ̃ sɛ̃.t‿ɑ̃dʁe]) is a commune in the Meurthe-et-Moselle department in north-eastern France.

== Population ==
Historical population
Year	Pop.	±% p.a.
1968	76	—
1975	68	−1.58%
1982	53	−3.50%
1990	50	−0.73%
1999	42	−1.92%
2007	53	+2.95%
2012	56	+1.11%
2017	57	+0.35%
2023	62	+1.41%
Source: INSEE

== See also ==
- Communes of the Meurthe-et-Moselle department
