= Selaincourt =

- Commune
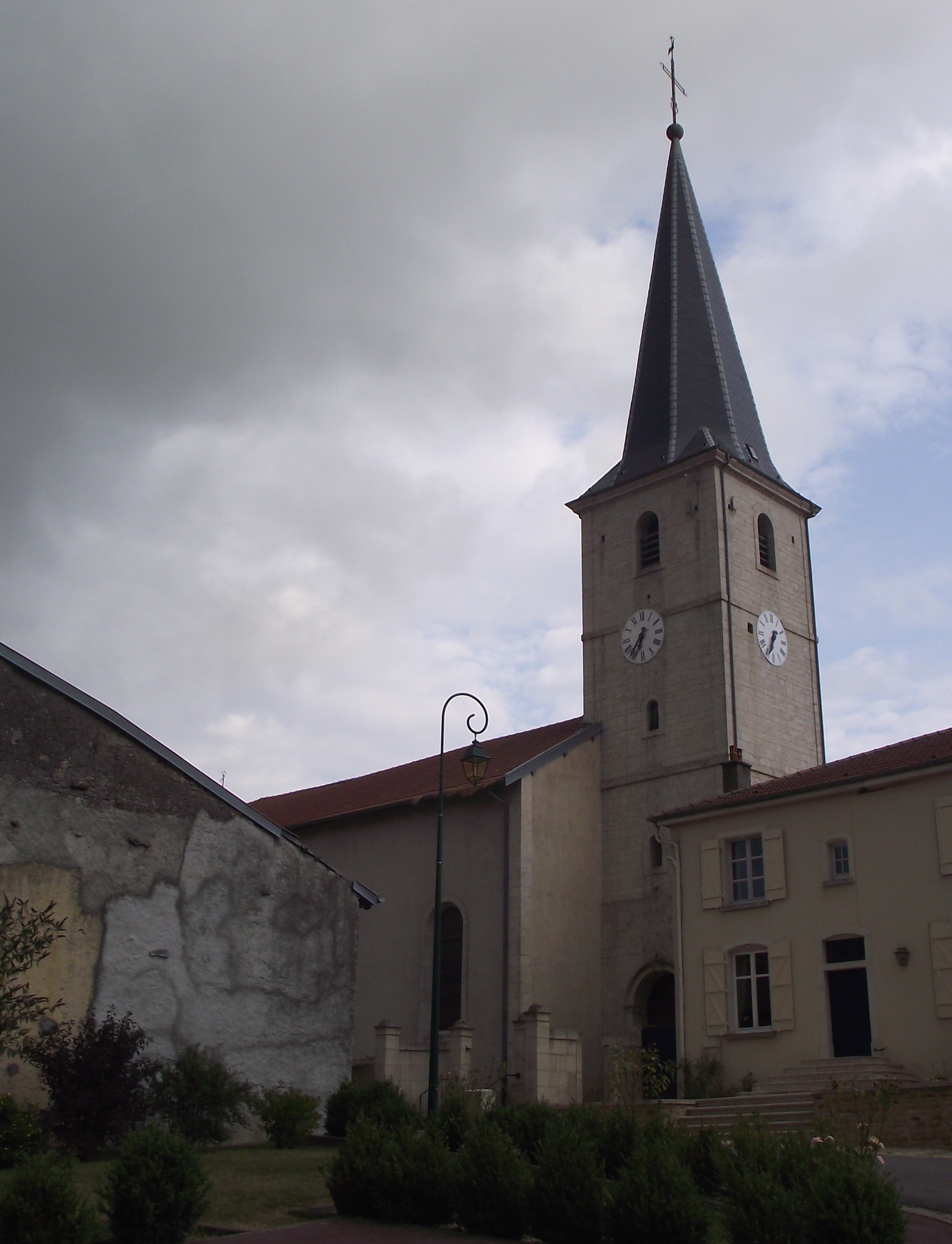
- The church in Selaincourt

- Coat of arms
- Location of Selaincourt
- Location within France Location within Grand Est
- Coordinates: 48°30′01″N 5°58′05″E
- Country: France
- Region: Grand Est
- Department: Meurthe-et-Moselle
- Arrondissement: Toul
- Canton: Meine au Saintois
- Intercommunality: CC Pays de Colombey et Sud Toulois

Government
  - Mayor (2021–2026): Françoise Vallance
- Area^{1}: 10.86 km^{2} (4.19 sq mi)
- Elevation: 340 m (1,120 ft)
- Highest elevation: 436 m (1,430 ft)
- Lowest elevation: 292 m (958 ft)
- Population (2023): 193
  - Density: 17.8/km^{2} (46.0/sq mi)
- Time zone: UTC+01:00 (CET)
  - Summer (DST): UTC+02:00 (CEST)
- INSEE/Postal code: 54500 /54170
- ^{1} French Land Register data, which excludes lakes, ponds, glaciers > 1 km^{2} (0.386 sq mi or 247 acres) and river estuaries.

Selaincourt (French pronunciation: [səlɛ̃kuʁ]) is a commune in the Meurthe-et-Moselle department in north-eastern France.

== Population ==
Historical population
Year	Pop.	±% p.a.
1968	132	—
1975	111	−2.44%
1982	123	+1.48%
1990	143	+1.90%
1999	182	+2.72%
2007	188	+0.41%
2012	183	−0.54%
2017	180	−0.33%
2023	193	+1.17%
Source: INSEE

== See also ==
- Communes of the Meurthe-et-Moselle department
