= Uruffe =

- Commune
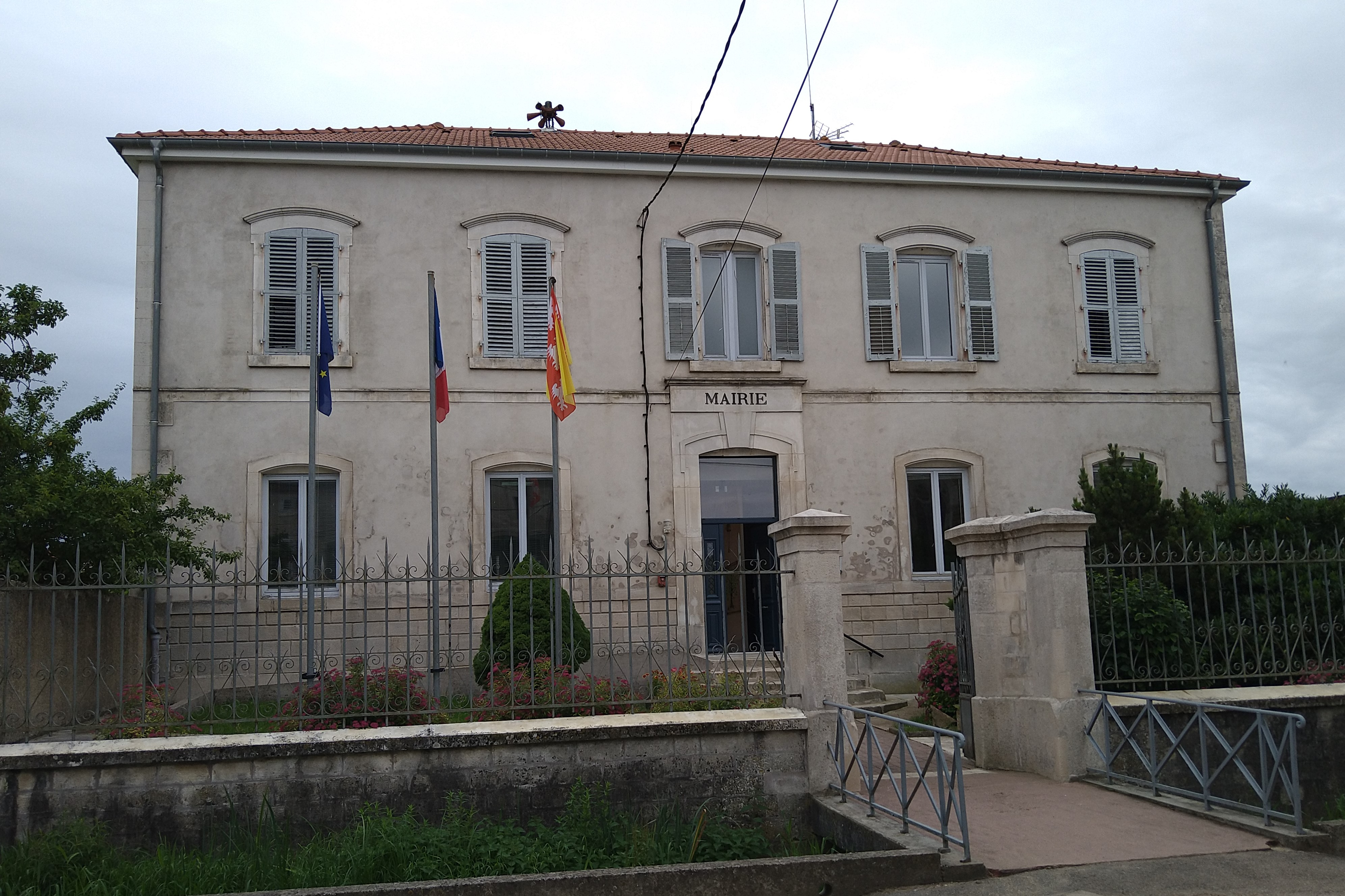
- Uruffe Town Hall

- Coat of arms
- Location of Uruffe
- Location within France Location within Grand Est
- Coordinates: 48°34′12″N 5°44′41″E
- Country: France
- Region: Grand Est
- Department: Meurthe-et-Moselle
- Arrondissement: Toul
- Canton: Meine au Saintois
- Intercommunality: CC Pays de Colombey et Sud Toulois

Government
  - Mayor (2020–2026): Elisabeth Delcroix
- Area^{1}: 13.05 km^{2} (5.04 sq mi)
- Elevation: 270 m (890 ft)
- Highest elevation: 401 m (1,316 ft)
- Lowest elevation: 257 m (843 ft)
- Population (2023): 365
  - Density: 28.0/km^{2} (72.4/sq mi)
- Time zone: UTC+01:00 (CET)
  - Summer (DST): UTC+02:00 (CEST)
- INSEE/Postal code: 54538 /54112
- ^{1} French Land Register data, which excludes lakes, ponds, glaciers > 1 km^{2} (0.386 sq mi or 247 acres) and river estuaries.

Uruffe (French pronunciation: [yʁyf]) is a commune in the Meurthe-et-Moselle department in north-eastern France.

== The scandal of the priest of Uruffe ==
The scandal of the priest of Uruffe was a newsworthy event in the 1950s. It concerns the crime committed by the Catholic priest Guy Desnoyers.

A peasant's son, Guy Desnoyers was ordained a priest in 1946. In July 1950, he was appointed parish priest in Uruffe. He was a very active priest who was rather appreciated by his parishioners, and won fame for organizing young boys of the area into a soccer team. However, at the same time, Desnoyers had relationships with several women. In 1953, he conceived a child with a fifteen-year-old girl, Michèle L. He persuaded her to give birth secretly and to abandon her child. In 1956, he had another relationship with Régine Fays, a nineteen-year-old girl from Uruffe, whom he seduced in the theater activities he had created; she also became pregnant. Desnoyers was able to persuade Régine's father that her lover was a young man from the village who went to fight in the Algerian War. Régine promised to keep the secret about the father but she refused to give birth secretly.

On 3 December 1956, a short time before the expected delivery date, a frightened Desnoyers shot his mistress in the head on a road. He then performed a Caesarean to extract the female child she bore. He then baptized and killed the baby, slashing its face to prevent recognition. The day after, he helped to search for the bodies, claiming that he knew the murderer but was unable to expose the murderer because of the obligations imposed by receiving confessions. On 5 December he confessed his crime. On 26 January 1958 he was condemned, by the Court of assizes of Nancy, to forced labor for life. He was released in August 1978 and retired in a monastery in Brittany, where he died in 2010.

== See also ==
- Communes of the Meurthe-et-Moselle department
