= Dolcourt =

- Commune
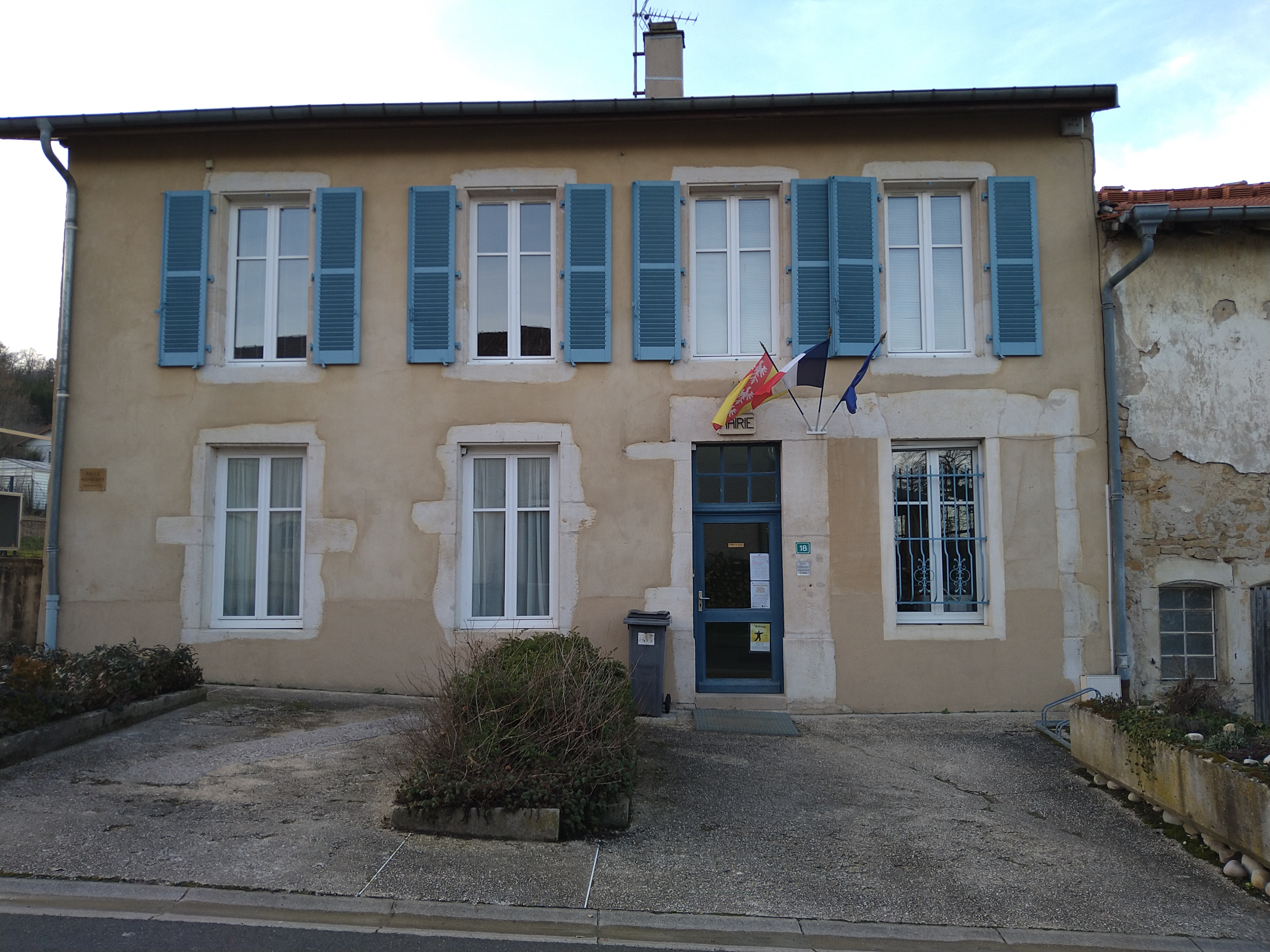
- Town hall

- Coat of arms
- Location of Dolcourt
- Location within France Location within Grand Est
- Coordinates: 48°29′28″N 5°58′42″E
- Country: France
- Region: Grand Est
- Department: Meurthe-et-Moselle
- Arrondissement: Toul
- Canton: Meine au Saintois
- Intercommunality: CC Pays de Colombey et Sud Toulois

Government
  - Mayor (2020–2026): Damien Bonal
- Area^{1}: 6.19 km^{2} (2.39 sq mi)
- Elevation: 400 m (1,300 ft)
- Highest elevation: 432 m (1,417 ft)
- Lowest elevation: 283 m (928 ft)
- Population (2023): 150
  - Density: 24/km^{2} (63/sq mi)
- Time zone: UTC+01:00 (CET)
  - Summer (DST): UTC+02:00 (CEST)
- INSEE/Postal code: 54158 /54170
- ^{1} French Land Register data, which excludes lakes, ponds, glaciers > 1 km^{2} (0.386 sq mi or 247 acres) and river estuaries.

Dolcourt (French pronunciation: [dɔlkuʁ]) is a commune in the Meurthe-et-Moselle department in north-eastern France.

== See also ==
- Communes of the Meurthe-et-Moselle department
