= Crépey =

- Commune
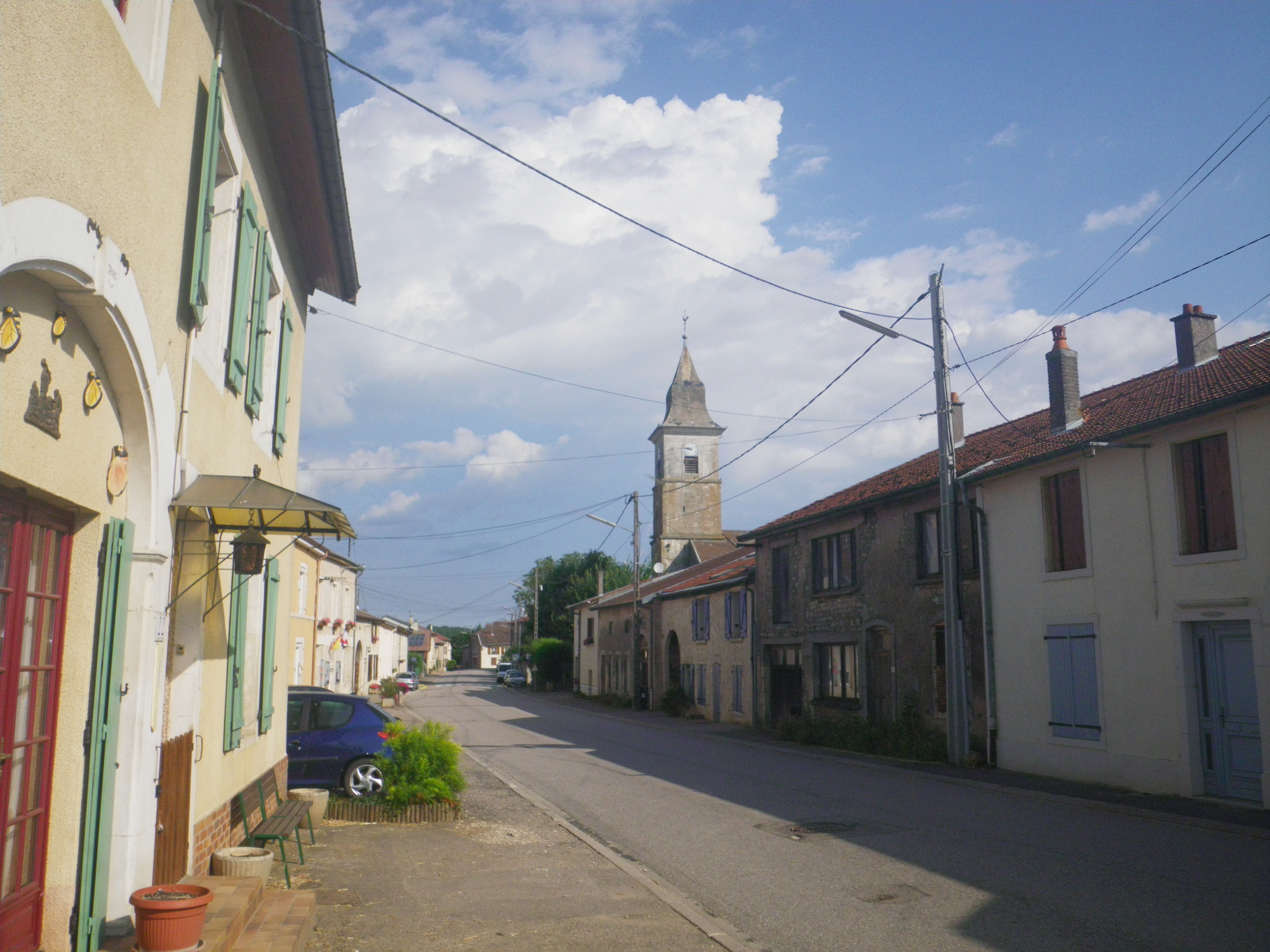
- A view within Crépey

- Coat of arms
- Location of Crépey
- Location within France Location within Grand Est
- Coordinates: 48°31′43″N 5°58′20″E
- Country: France
- Region: Grand Est
- Department: Meurthe-et-Moselle
- Arrondissement: Toul
- Canton: Meine au Saintois
- Intercommunality: CC Pays de Colombey et Sud Toulois

Government
  - Mayor (2020–2026): Daniel Thomassin
- Area^{1}: 20.9 km^{2} (8.1 sq mi)
- Highest elevation: 434 m (1,424 ft)
- Lowest elevation: 297 m (974 ft)
- Population (2023): 388
  - Density: 18.6/km^{2} (48.1/sq mi)
- Time zone: UTC+01:00 (CET)
  - Summer (DST): UTC+02:00 (CEST)
- INSEE/Postal code: 54143 /54170
- ^{1} French Land Register data, which excludes lakes, ponds, glaciers > 1 km^{2} (0.386 sq mi or 247 acres) and river estuaries.

Crépey (French pronunciation: [kʁepɛ]) is a commune in the Meurthe-et-Moselle department in north-eastern France.

The altitude of the commune of Crépey ranges between 297 and 434 meters. The area of the commune is 20.90 km^{2}.

== Population and Housing ==
As of 2023, the population of the commune was 388. As of 2019, there are 176 dwellings in the commune, of which 157 primary residences.

== See also ==
- Communes of the Meurthe-et-Moselle department
