= Courcelles, Meurthe-et-Moselle =

Courcelles
- Commune
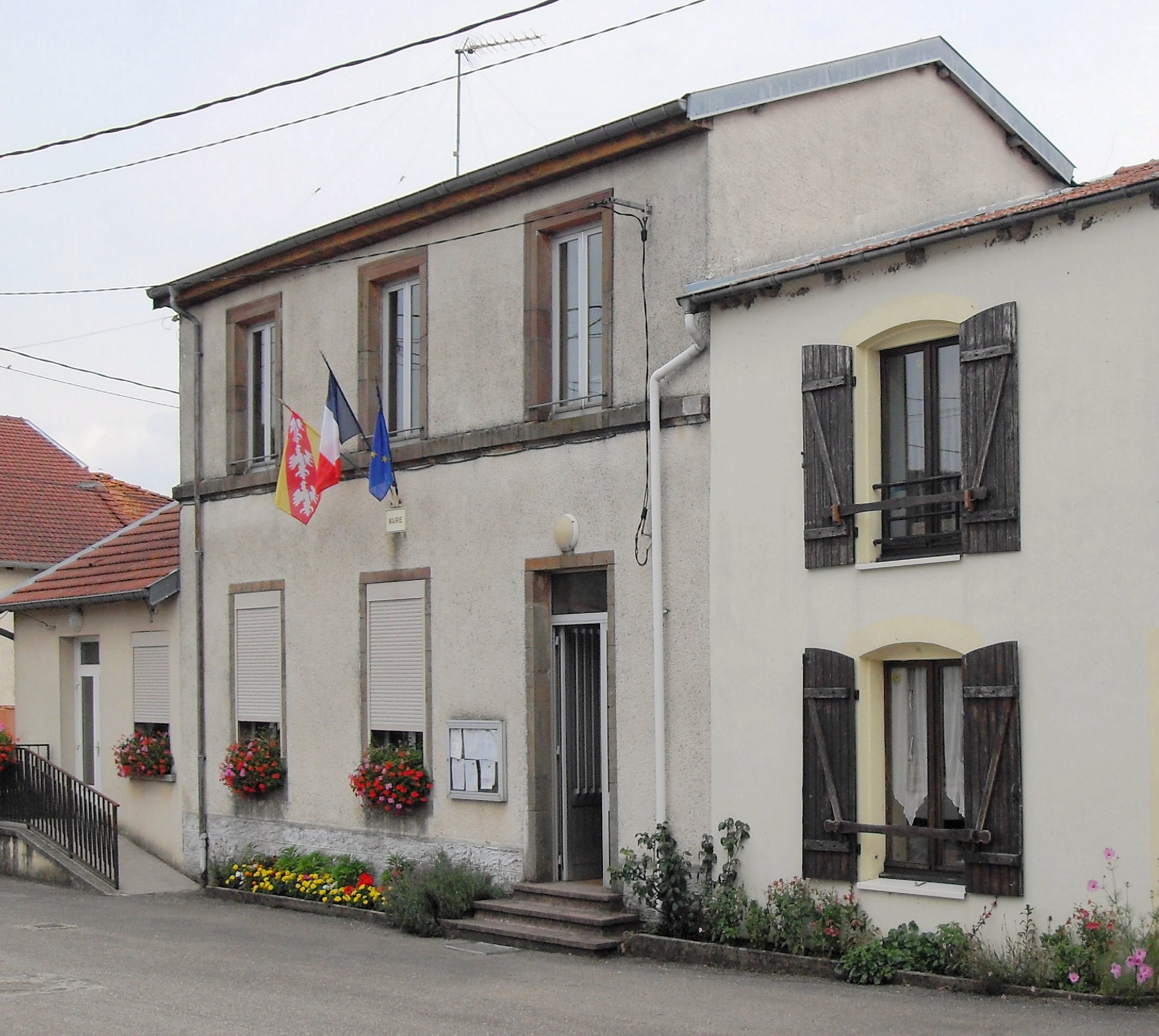
- Courcelles Town hall

- Coat of arms
- Location of Courcelles
- Location within France Location within Grand Est
- Coordinates: 48°22′27″N 6°02′18″E
- Country: France
- Region: Grand Est
- Department: Meurthe-et-Moselle
- Arrondissement: Toul
- Canton: Meine au Saintois
- Intercommunality: CC Pays de Colombey et Sud Toulois

Government
  - Mayor (2020–2026): Sonia Chaumont
- Area^{1}: 4.31 km^{2} (1.66 sq mi)
- Elevation: 320 m (1,050 ft)
- Highest elevation: 400 m (1,300 ft)
- Lowest elevation: 312 m (1,024 ft)
- Population (2023): 85
  - Density: 20/km^{2} (51/sq mi)
- Time zone: UTC+01:00 (CET)
  - Summer (DST): UTC+02:00 (CEST)
- INSEE/Postal code: 54140 /54930
- ^{1} French Land Register data, which excludes lakes, ponds, glaciers > 1 km^{2} (0.386 sq mi or 247 acres) and river estuaries.

Courcelles (French pronunciation: [kuʁsɛl]) is a commune in the Meurthe-et-Moselle department in north-eastern France.

== See also ==
- Communes of the Meurthe-et-Moselle department
