= Tramont-Lassus =

- Commune
- Coat of arms
- Location of Tramont-Lassus
- Location within France Location within Grand Est
- Coordinates: 48°23′50″N 5°57′44″E
- Country: France
- Region: Grand Est
- Department: Meurthe-et-Moselle
- Arrondissement: Toul
- Canton: Meine au Saintois
- Intercommunality: CC Pays de Colombey et Sud Toulois

Government
  - Mayor (2020–2026): Roland Huel
- Area^{1}: 5.76 km^{2} (2.22 sq mi)
- Elevation: 410 m (1,350 ft)
- Highest elevation: 499 m (1,637 ft)
- Lowest elevation: 390 m (1,280 ft)
- Population (2023): 89
  - Density: 15/km^{2} (40/sq mi)
- Time zone: UTC+01:00 (CET)
  - Summer (DST): UTC+02:00 (CEST)
- INSEE/Postal code: 54530 /54115
- ^{1} French Land Register data, which excludes lakes, ponds, glaciers > 1 km^{2} (0.386 sq mi or 247 acres) and river estuaries.

Tramont-Lassus is a commune in the Meurthe-et-Moselle department in north-eastern France.

== See also ==
- Communes of the Meurthe-et-Moselle department
