= Fécocourt =

- Commune
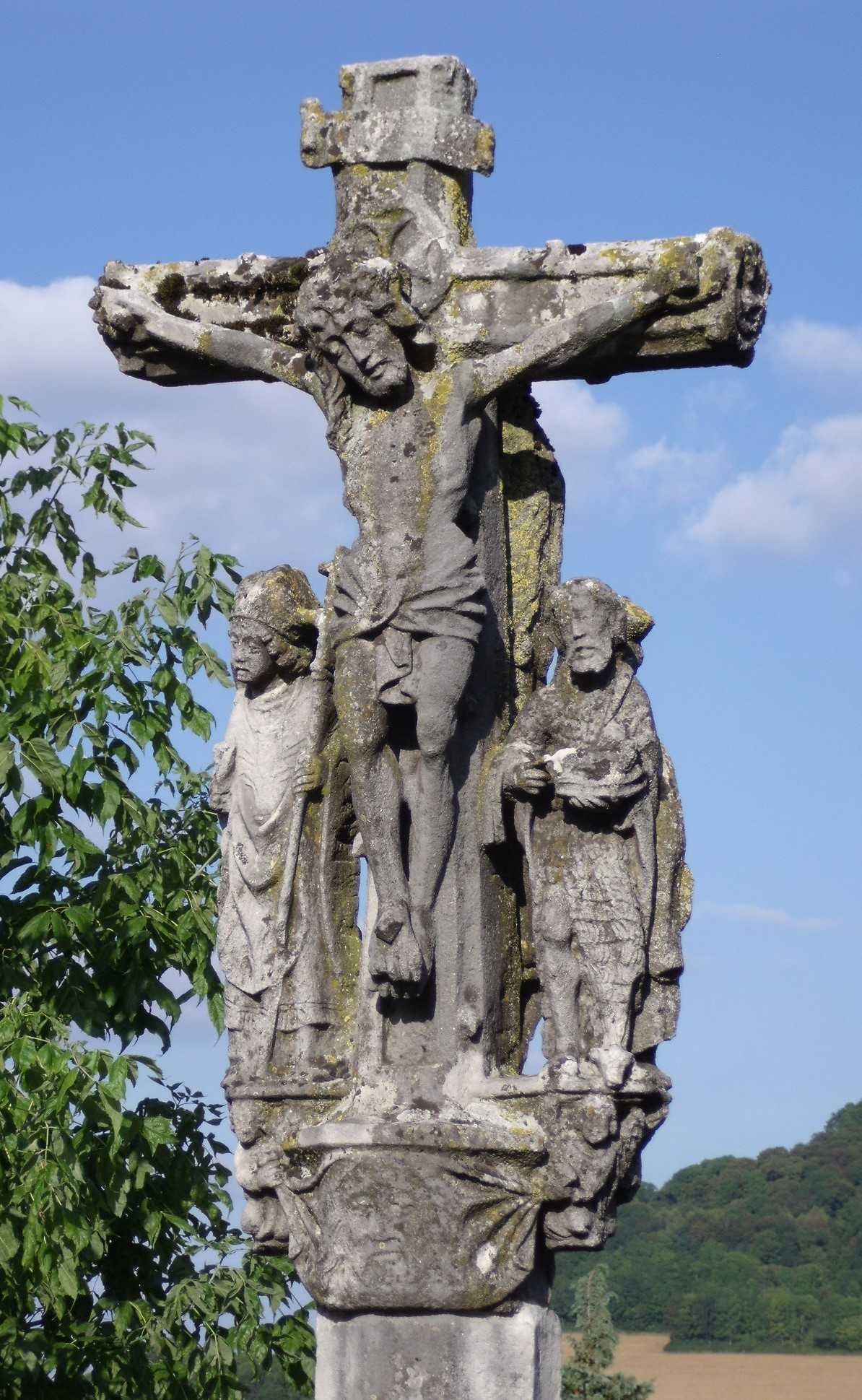
- The cemetery cross in Fécocourt

- Coat of arms
- Location of Fécocourt
- Location within France Location within Grand Est
- Coordinates: 48°24′18″N 6°00′32″E
- Country: France
- Region: Grand Est
- Department: Meurthe-et-Moselle
- Arrondissement: Toul
- Canton: Meine au Saintois
- Intercommunality: CC Pays de Colombey et Sud Toulois

Government
  - Mayor (2020–2026): David Bruggmann
- Area^{1}: 7.86 km^{2} (3.03 sq mi)
- Elevation: 317 m (1,040 ft)
- Highest elevation: 499 m (1,637 ft)
- Lowest elevation: 305 m (1,001 ft)
- Population (2023): 105
  - Density: 13.4/km^{2} (34.6/sq mi)
- Time zone: UTC+01:00 (CET)
  - Summer (DST): UTC+02:00 (CEST)
- INSEE/Postal code: 54190 /54115
- ^{1} French Land Register data, which excludes lakes, ponds, glaciers > 1 km^{2} (0.386 sq mi or 247 acres) and river estuaries.

Fécocourt (French pronunciation: [fekɔkuʁ]) is a commune in the Meurthe-et-Moselle department in north-eastern France.

== Population ==
Historical population
Year	Pop.	±% p.a.
1968	147	—
1975	125	−2.29%
1982	93	−4.14%
1990	85	−1.12%
1999	101	+1.93%
2007	108	+0.84%
2012	113	+0.91%
2017	109	−0.72%
2023	105	−0.62%
Source: INSEE

== See also ==
- Communes of the Meurthe-et-Moselle department
