= Vandeléville =

- Commune
- Coat of arms
- Location of Vandeléville
- Location within France Location within Grand Est
- Coordinates: 48°25′41″N 5°59′41″E
- Country: France
- Region: Grand Est
- Department: Meurthe-et-Moselle
- Arrondissement: Toul
- Canton: Meine au Saintois
- Intercommunality: CC Pays de Colombey et Sud Toulois

Government
  - Mayor (2020–2026): Claude Deloffre
- Area^{1}: 9.86 km^{2} (3.81 sq mi)
- Elevation: 326 m (1,070 ft)
- Highest elevation: 485 m (1,591 ft)
- Lowest elevation: 293 m (961 ft)
- Population (2023): 209
  - Density: 21.2/km^{2} (54.9/sq mi)
- Time zone: UTC+01:00 (CET)
  - Summer (DST): UTC+02:00 (CEST)
- INSEE/Postal code: 54545 /54115
- ^{1} French Land Register data, which excludes lakes, ponds, glaciers > 1 km^{2} (0.386 sq mi or 247 acres) and river estuaries.

Vandeléville (French pronunciation: [vɑ̃dlevil]) is a commune in the Meurthe-et-Moselle department in north-eastern France.

== See also ==
- Communes of the Meurthe-et-Moselle department
