= Germiny =

- Commune
- Coat of arms
- Location of Germiny
- Location within France Location within Grand Est
- Coordinates: 48°32′54″N 5°59′52″E
- Country: France
- Region: Grand Est
- Department: Meurthe-et-Moselle
- Arrondissement: Toul
- Canton: Meine au Saintois
- Intercommunality: CC Pays de Colombey et Sud Toulois

Government
  - Mayor (2020–2026): Patrick Dethorey
- Area^{1}: 11.85 km^{2} (4.58 sq mi)
- Elevation: 310 m (1,020 ft)
- Highest elevation: 443 m (1,453 ft)
- Lowest elevation: 294 m (965 ft)
- Population (2023): 188
  - Density: 15.9/km^{2} (41.1/sq mi)
- Time zone: UTC+01:00 (CET)
  - Summer (DST): UTC+02:00 (CEST)
- INSEE/Postal code: 54223 /54170
- ^{1} French Land Register data, which excludes lakes, ponds, glaciers > 1 km^{2} (0.386 sq mi or 247 acres) and river estuaries.

Germiny (French pronunciation: [ʒɛʁmini]) is a commune in the Meurthe-et-Moselle department in north-eastern France.

== See also ==
- Communes of the Meurthe-et-Moselle department
