= Thuilley-aux-Groseilles =

- Commune
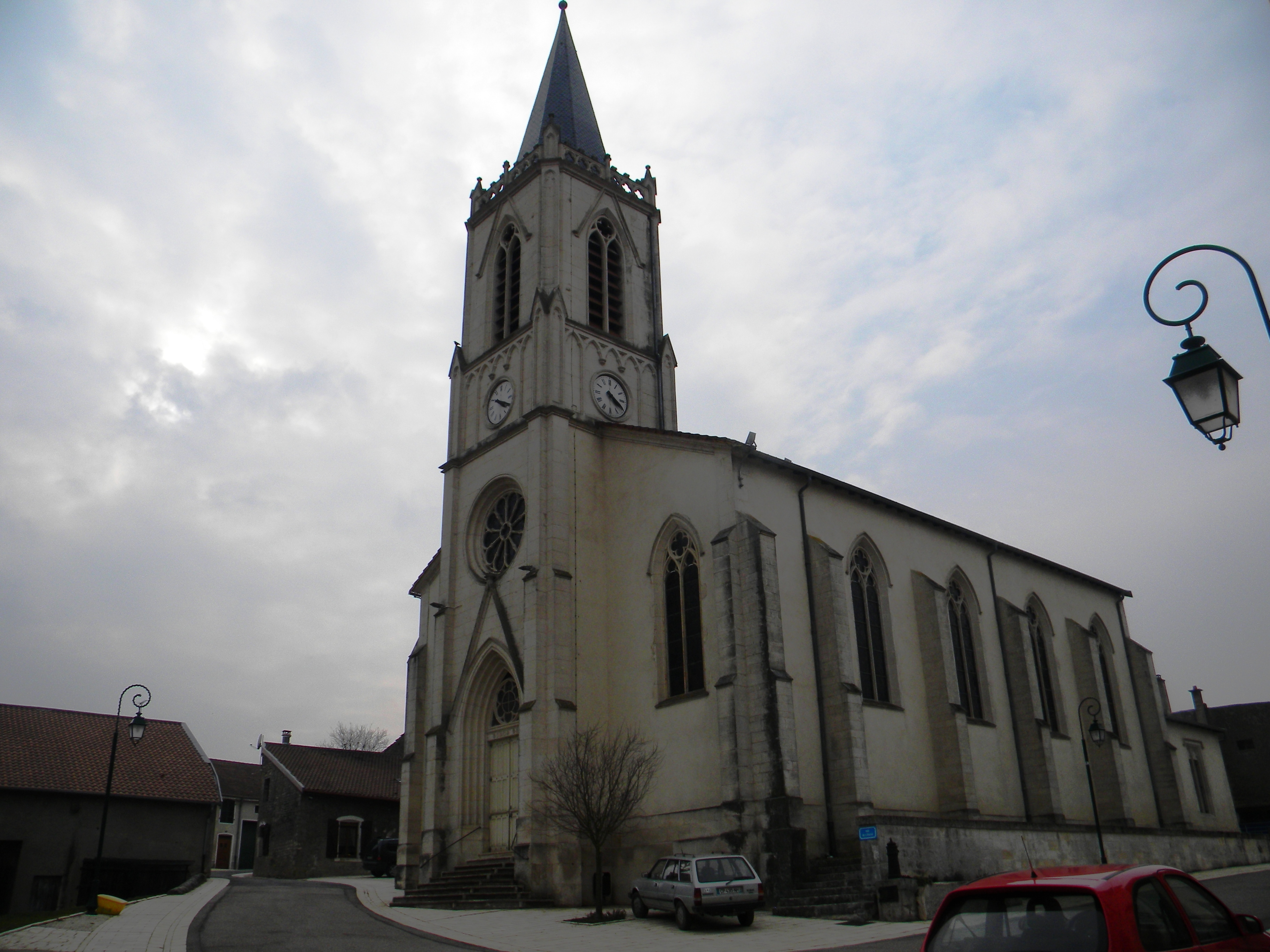
- The church in Thuilley-aux-Groseilles

- Coat of arms
- Location of Thuilley-aux-Groseilles
- Location within France Location within Grand Est
- Coordinates: 48°34′30″N 5°58′24″E
- Country: France
- Region: Grand Est
- Department: Meurthe-et-Moselle
- Arrondissement: Toul
- Canton: Meine au Saintois
- Intercommunality: CC Pays de Colombey et Sud Toulois

Government
  - Mayor (2020–2026): Laurence Broquerie
- Area^{1}: 9.12 km^{2} (3.52 sq mi)
- Elevation: 310 m (1,020 ft)
- Highest elevation: 382 m (1,253 ft)
- Lowest elevation: 268 m (879 ft)
- Population (2023): 447
  - Density: 49.0/km^{2} (127/sq mi)
- Time zone: UTC+01:00 (CET)
  - Summer (DST): UTC+02:00 (CEST)
- INSEE/Postal code: 54523 /54170
- ^{1} French Land Register data, which excludes lakes, ponds, glaciers > 1 km^{2} (0.386 sq mi or 247 acres) and river estuaries.

Thuilley-aux-Groseilles (French pronunciation: [tɥijɛ o ɡʁozɛj]) is a commune in the Meurthe-et-Moselle department in north-eastern France.

== See also ==
- Communes of the Meurthe-et-Moselle department
