= Saulxures-lès-Vannes =

- Commune
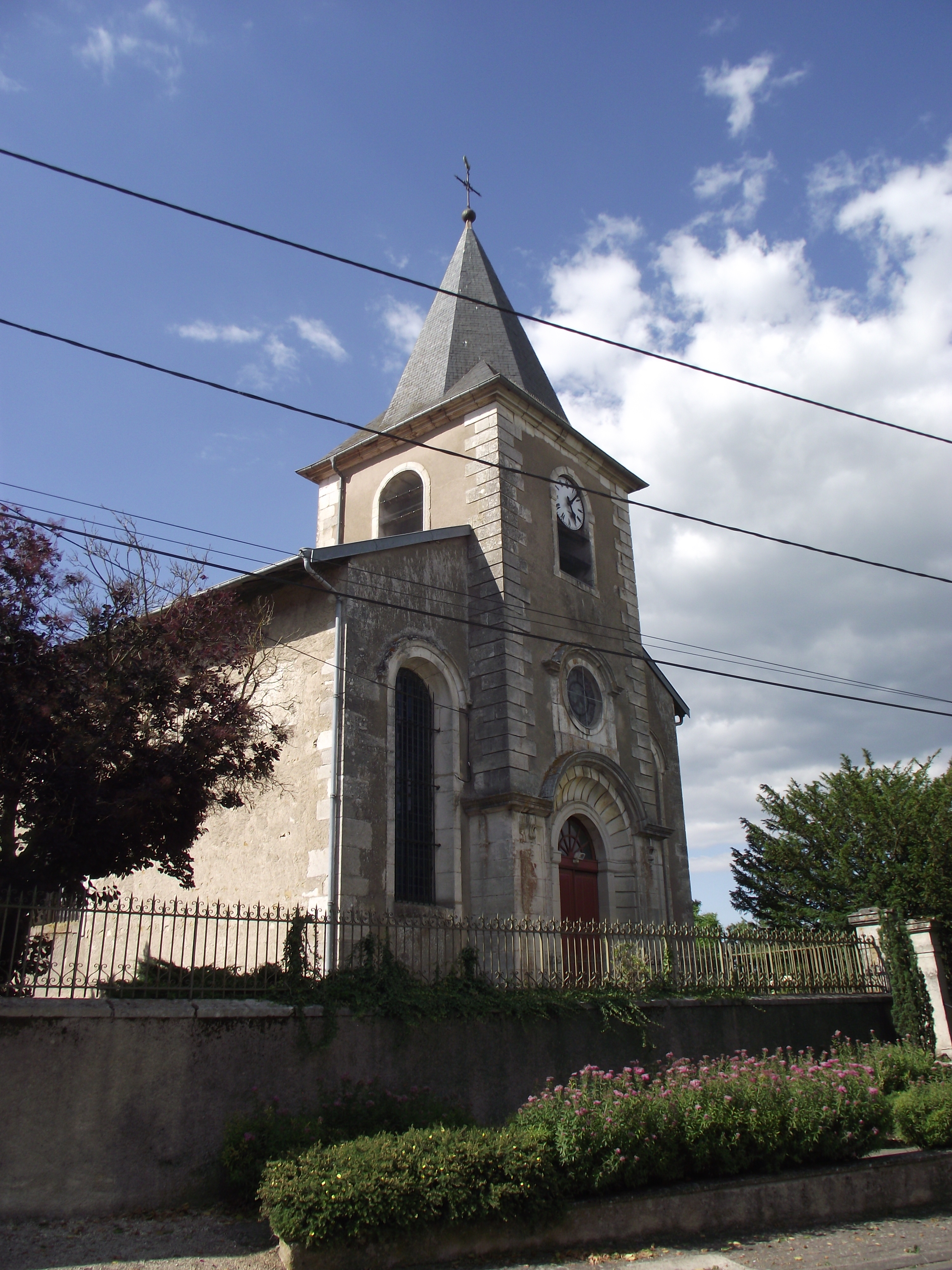
- The church in Saulxures-lès-Vannes

- Coat of arms
- Location of Saulxures-lès-Vannes
- Location within France Location within Grand Est
- Coordinates: 48°31′37″N 5°48′29″E
- Country: France
- Region: Grand Est
- Department: Meurthe-et-Moselle
- Arrondissement: Toul
- Canton: Meine au Saintois
- Intercommunality: CC Pays de Colombey et Sud Toulois

Government
  - Mayor (2020–2026): Pascal Kaci
- Area^{1}: 18.04 km^{2} (6.97 sq mi)
- Elevation: 412 m (1,352 ft)
- Highest elevation: 427 m (1,401 ft)
- Lowest elevation: 271 m (889 ft)
- Population (2023): 376
  - Density: 20.8/km^{2} (54.0/sq mi)
- Time zone: UTC+01:00 (CET)
  - Summer (DST): UTC+02:00 (CEST)
- INSEE/Postal code: 54496 /54170
- ^{1} French Land Register data, which excludes lakes, ponds, glaciers > 1 km^{2} (0.386 sq mi or 247 acres) and river estuaries.

Saulxures-lès-Vannes is a commune in the Meurthe-et-Moselle department in north-eastern France.

== Population ==
Historical population
Year	Pop.	±% p.a.
1968	380	—
1975	345	−1.37%
1982	319	−1.11%
1990	333	+0.54%
1999	378	+1.42%
2007	376	−0.07%
2012	358	−0.98%
2017	373	+0.82%
2023	376	+0.13%
Source: INSEE

== See also ==
- Communes of the Meurthe-et-Moselle department
