= Battigny =

- Commune
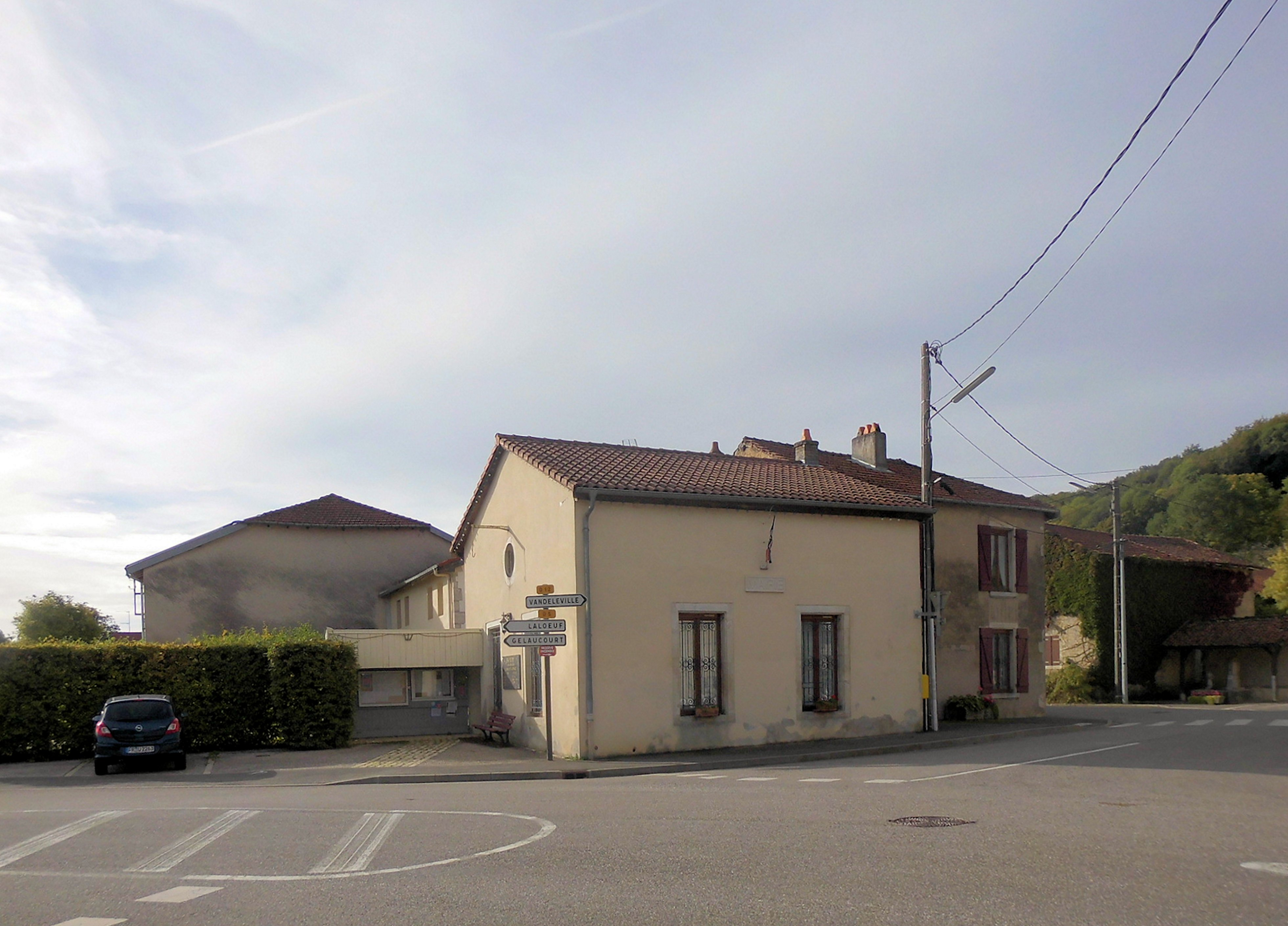
- The town hall in Battigny

- Coat of arms
- Location of Battigny
- Location within France Location within Grand Est
- Coordinates: 48°26′54″N 5°58′51″E
- Country: France
- Region: Grand Est
- Department: Meurthe-et-Moselle
- Arrondissement: Toul
- Canton: Meine au Saintois
- Intercommunality: CC Pays de Colombey et Sud Toulois

Government
  - Mayor (2020–2026): Denis Thomassin
- Area^{1}: 6.41 km^{2} (2.47 sq mi)
- Elevation: 346 m (1,135 ft)
- Highest elevation: 469 m (1,539 ft)
- Lowest elevation: 296 m (971 ft)
- Population (2023): 139
  - Density: 21.7/km^{2} (56.2/sq mi)
- Time zone: UTC+01:00 (CET)
  - Summer (DST): UTC+02:00 (CEST)
- INSEE/Postal code: 54052 /54115
- ^{1} French Land Register data, which excludes lakes, ponds, glaciers > 1 km^{2} (0.386 sq mi or 247 acres) and river estuaries.

Battigny (French pronunciation: [batiɲi]) is a commune in the Meurthe-et-Moselle department in northeastern France.

== Population ==
Historical population
Year	Pop.	±% p.a.
1968	97	—
1975	94	−0.45%
1982	104	+1.45%
1990	94	−1.26%
1999	91	−0.36%
2007	105	+1.80%
2012	119	+2.53%
2017	142	+3.60%
2023	139	−0.36%
Source: INSEE

== See also ==
- Communes of the Meurthe-et-Moselle department
