= Mont-l'Étroit =

- Commune
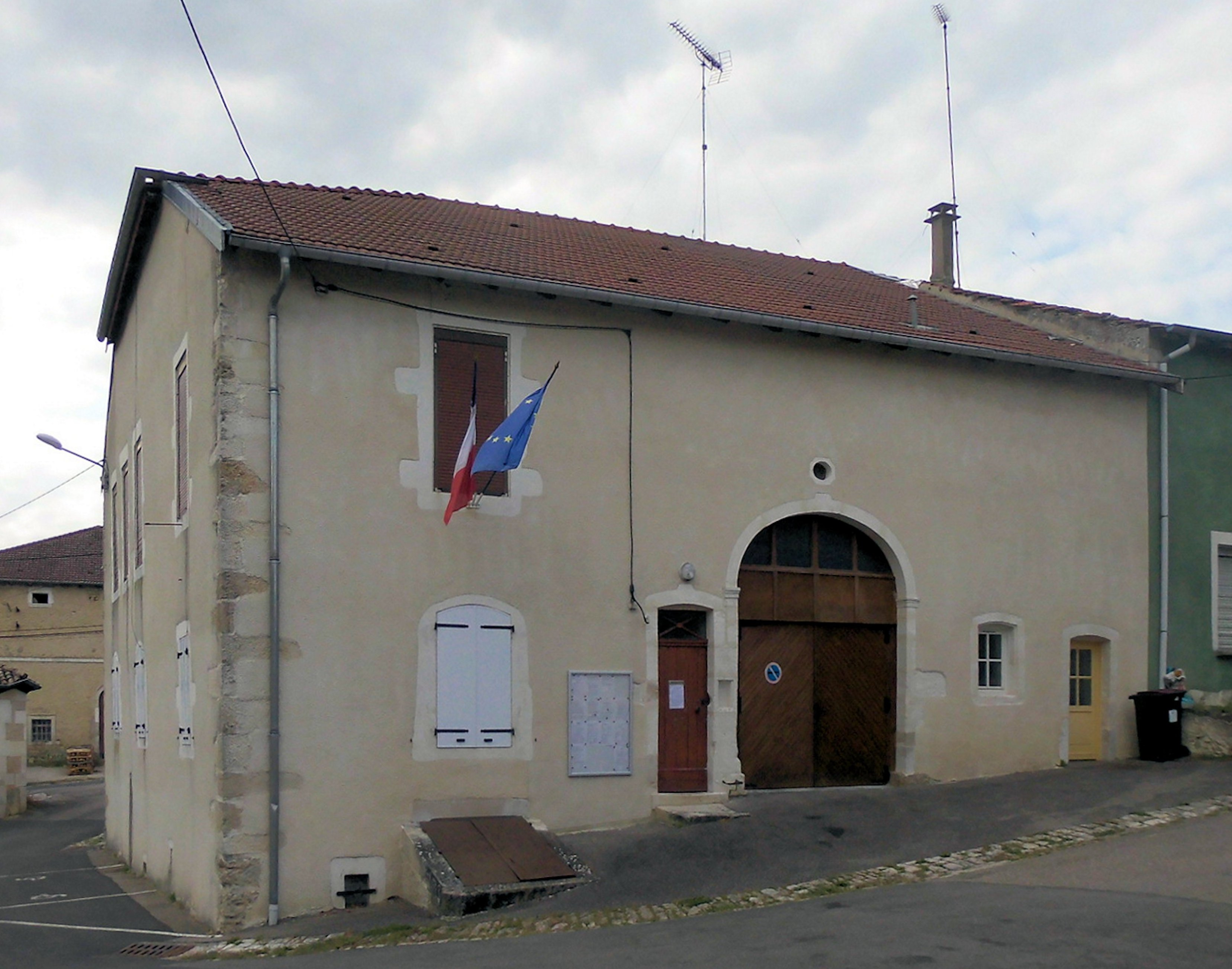
- The town hall in Mont-l'Étroit

- Coat of arms
- Location of Mont-l'Étroit
- Location within France Location within Grand Est
- Coordinates: 48°29′56″N 5°47′08″E
- Country: France
- Region: Grand Est
- Department: Meurthe-et-Moselle
- Arrondissement: Toul
- Canton: Meine au Saintois
- Intercommunality: CC Pays de Colombey et Sud Toulois

Government
  - Mayor (2020–2026): Jean-Jacques Tavernier
- Area^{1}: 6.42 km^{2} (2.48 sq mi)
- Elevation: 389 m (1,276 ft)
- Highest elevation: 427 m (1,401 ft)
- Lowest elevation: 286 m (938 ft)
- Population (2023): 93
  - Density: 14/km^{2} (38/sq mi)
- Time zone: UTC+01:00 (CET)
  - Summer (DST): UTC+02:00 (CEST)
- INSEE/Postal code: 54379 /54170
- ^{1} French Land Register data, which excludes lakes, ponds, glaciers > 1 km^{2} (0.386 sq mi or 247 acres) and river estuaries.

Mont-l'Étroit (French pronunciation: [mɔ̃ letʁwa]) is a commune in the Meurthe-et-Moselle department in North-Eastern France.

== See also ==
- Communes of the Meurthe-et-Moselle department
