= Tramont-Émy =

- Commune
- Coat of arms
- Location of Tramont-Émy
- Location within France Location within Grand Est
- Coordinates: 48°24′29″N 5°56′51″E
- Country: France
- Region: Grand Est
- Department: Meurthe-et-Moselle
- Arrondissement: Toul
- Canton: Meine au Saintois
- Intercommunality: CC Pays de Colombey et Sud Toulois

Government
  - Mayor (2024–2026): Francis Stephani
- Area^{1}: 3.91 km^{2} (1.51 sq mi)
- Elevation: 400 m (1,300 ft)
- Highest elevation: 470 m (1,540 ft)
- Lowest elevation: 378 m (1,240 ft)
- Population (2023): 28
  - Density: 7.2/km^{2} (19/sq mi)
- Time zone: UTC+01:00 (CET)
  - Summer (DST): UTC+02:00 (CEST)
- INSEE/Postal code: 54529 /54115
- ^{1} French Land Register data, which excludes lakes, ponds, glaciers > 1 km^{2} (0.386 sq mi or 247 acres) and river estuaries.

Tramont-Émy (French pronunciation: [tʁamɔ̃ emi]) is a commune in the Meurthe-et-Moselle department in north-eastern France.

== See also ==
- Communes of the Meurthe-et-Moselle department
