= Blénod-lès-Toul =

- Commune
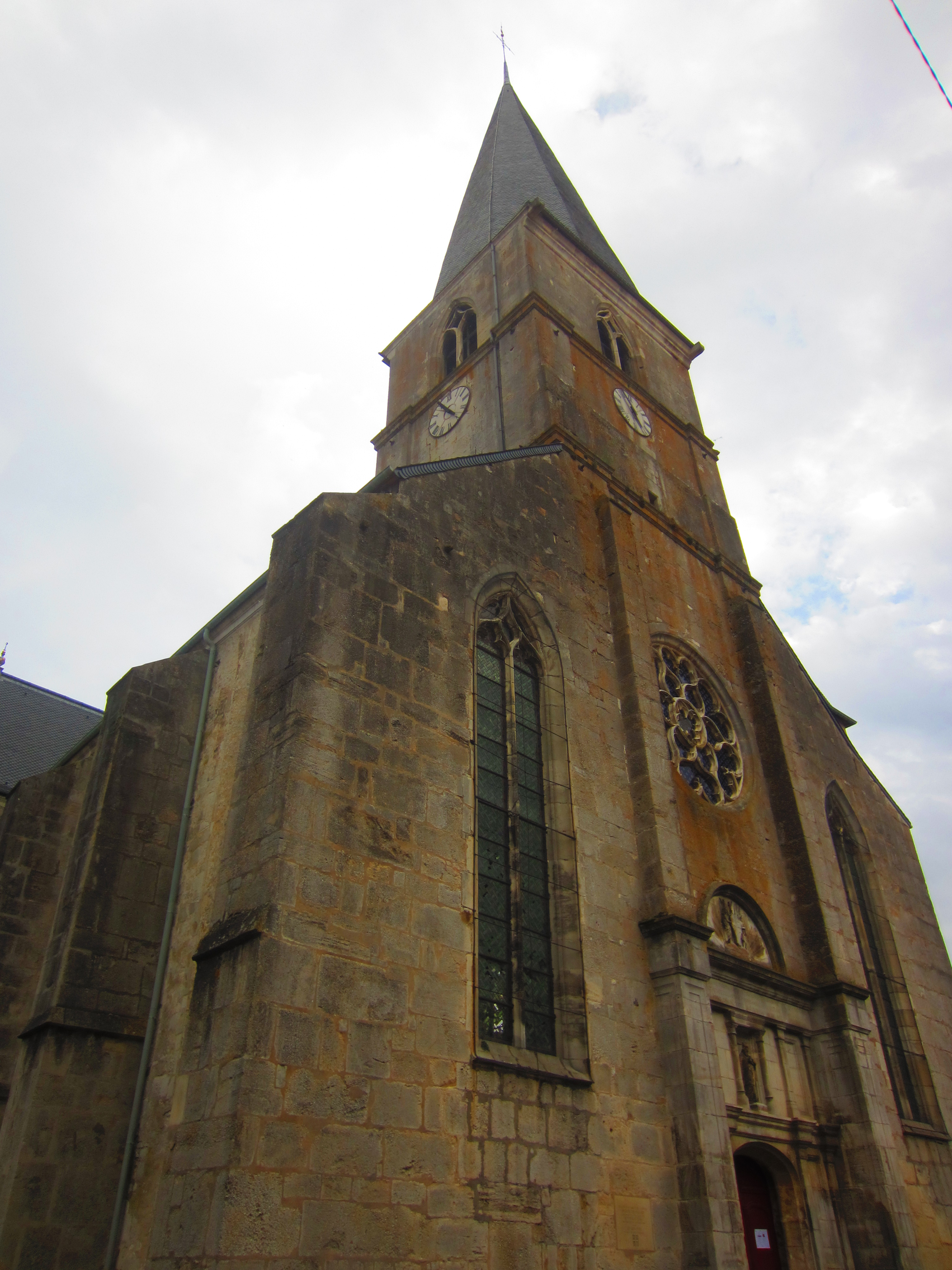
- The church in Blénod-lès-Toul

- Coat of arms
- Location of Blénod-lès-Toul
- Location within France Location within Grand Est
- Coordinates: 48°36′00″N 5°50′03″E
- Country: France
- Region: Grand Est
- Department: Meurthe-et-Moselle
- Arrondissement: Toul
- Canton: Meine au Saintois
- Intercommunality: CC Pays de Colombey et Sud Toulois

Government
  - Mayor (2023–2026): Cécile Denis
- Area^{1}: 17.6 km^{2} (6.8 sq mi)
- Elevation: 285 m (935 ft)
- Highest elevation: 432 m (1,417 ft)
- Lowest elevation: 229 m (751 ft)
- Population (2023): 1,013
  - Density: 57.6/km^{2} (149/sq mi)
- Demonym: béléniens
- Time zone: UTC+01:00 (CET)
  - Summer (DST): UTC+02:00 (CEST)
- INSEE/Postal code: 54080 /54113
- ^{1} French Land Register data, which excludes lakes, ponds, glaciers > 1 km^{2} (0.386 sq mi or 247 acres) and river estuaries.

Blénod-lès-Toul (French pronunciation: [bleno lɛ tul], literally Blénod near Toul) is a commune in the Meurthe-et-Moselle department in northeastern France.

== Population ==
Historical population
Year	Pop.	±% p.a.
1968	818	—
1975	826	+0.14%
1982	798	−0.49%
1990	906	+1.60%
1999	952	+0.55%
2007	1,038	+1.09%
2012	1,054	+0.31%
2017	1,078	+0.45%
2023	1,013	−1.03%
Source: INSEE

== See also ==
- Communes of the Meurthe-et-Moselle department
