= Gélaucourt =

- Commune
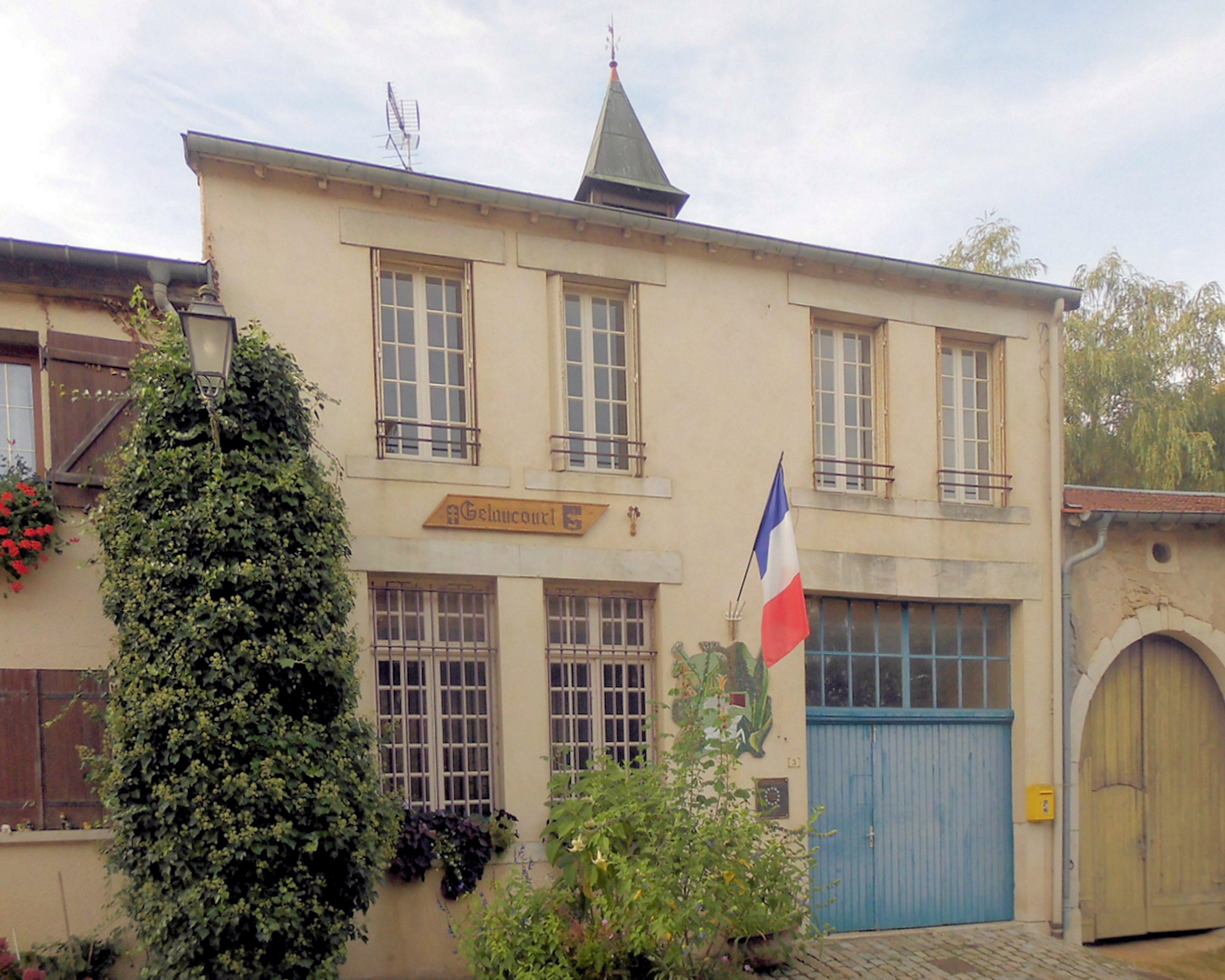
- The town hall in Gélaucourt

- Coat of arms
- Location of Gélaucourt
- Location within France Location within Grand Est
- Coordinates: 48°27′19″N 5°59′25″E
- Country: France
- Region: Grand Est
- Department: Meurthe-et-Moselle
- Arrondissement: Toul
- Canton: Meine au Saintois
- Intercommunality: CC Pays de Colombey et Sud Toulois

Government
  - Mayor (2020–2026): Michel Capdevielle
- Area^{1}: 2.26 km^{2} (0.87 sq mi)
- Elevation: 306 m (1,004 ft)
- Highest elevation: 395 m (1,296 ft)
- Lowest elevation: 295 m (968 ft)
- Population (2023): 49
  - Density: 22/km^{2} (56/sq mi)
- Time zone: UTC+01:00 (CET)
  - Summer (DST): UTC+02:00 (CEST)
- INSEE/Postal code: 54218 /54115
- ^{1} French Land Register data, which excludes lakes, ponds, glaciers > 1 km^{2} (0.386 sq mi or 247 acres) and river estuaries.

Gélaucourt (French pronunciation: [ʒelokuʁ]) is a commune in the Meurthe-et-Moselle department in north-eastern France.

== See also ==
- Communes of the Meurthe-et-Moselle department
