= Beuvezin =

- Commune
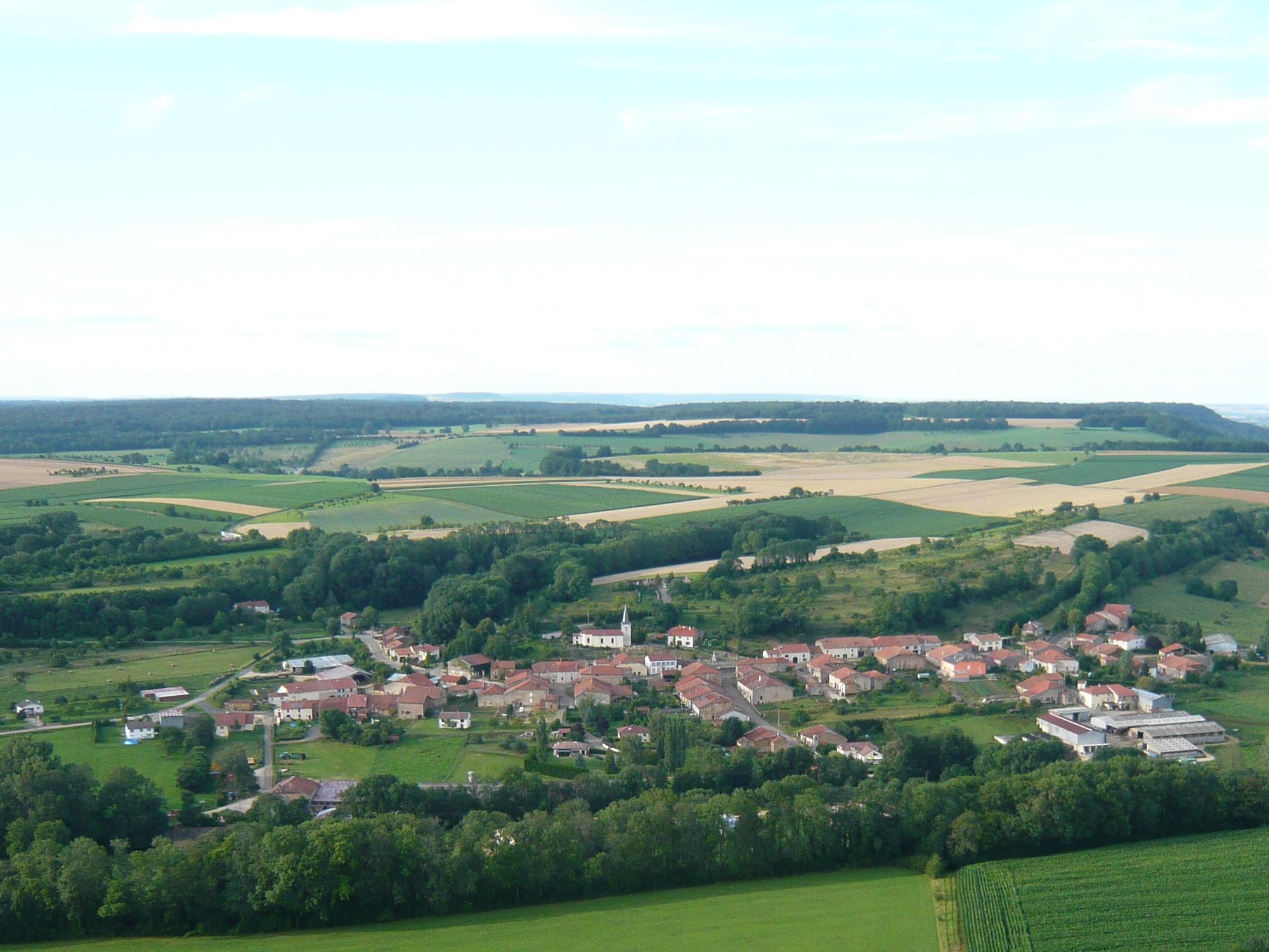
- An aerial view of Beuvezin

- Coat of arms
- Location of Beuvezin
- Location within France Location within Grand Est
- Coordinates: 48°22′48″N 5°57′35″E
- Country: France
- Region: Grand Est
- Department: Meurthe-et-Moselle
- Arrondissement: Toul
- Canton: Meine au Saintois
- Intercommunality: CC Pays de Colombey et Sud Toulois

Government
  - Mayor (2020–2026): Hervé Mangenot
- Area^{1}: 7.72 km^{2} (2.98 sq mi)
- Elevation: 441 m (1,447 ft)
- Highest elevation: 495 m (1,624 ft)
- Lowest elevation: 343 m (1,125 ft)
- Population (2023): 90
  - Density: 12/km^{2} (30/sq mi)
- Time zone: UTC+01:00 (CET)
  - Summer (DST): UTC+02:00 (CEST)
- INSEE/Postal code: 54068 /54115
- ^{1} French Land Register data, which excludes lakes, ponds, glaciers > 1 km^{2} (0.386 sq mi or 247 acres) and river estuaries.

Beuvezin (French pronunciation: [bœvzɛ̃]) is a commune in the Meurthe-et-Moselle department in northeastern France.

== Population ==
Historical population
Year	Pop.	±% p.a.
1968	153	—
1975	152	−0.09%
1982	140	−1.17%
1990	126	−1.31%
1999	125	−0.09%
2007	114	−1.14%
2012	111	−0.53%
2017	96	−2.86%
2023	90	−1.07%
Source: INSEE

== See also ==
- Communes of the Meurthe-et-Moselle department
