= Gémonville =

- Commune
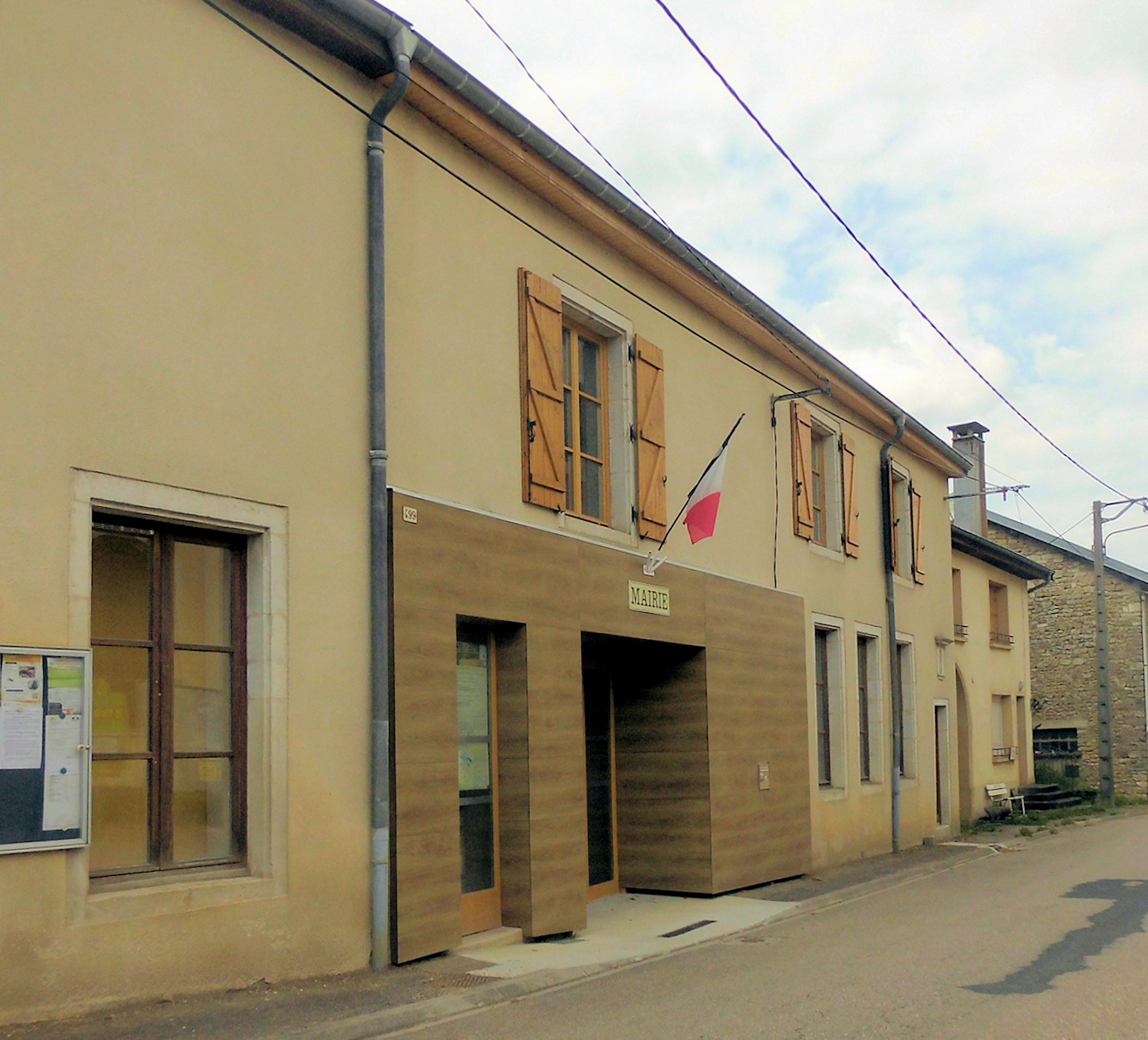
- The town hall in Gémonville

- Coat of arms
- Location of Gémonville
- Location within France Location within Grand Est
- Coordinates: 48°24′56″N 5°53′08″E
- Country: France
- Region: Grand Est
- Department: Meurthe-et-Moselle
- Arrondissement: Toul
- Canton: Meine au Saintois
- Intercommunality: CC Pays de Colombey et Sud Toulois

Government
  - Mayor (2020–2026): Alain Godard
- Area^{1}: 9.03 km^{2} (3.49 sq mi)
- Elevation: 349 m (1,145 ft)
- Highest elevation: 428 m (1,404 ft)
- Lowest elevation: 331 m (1,086 ft)
- Population (2023): 74
  - Density: 8.2/km^{2} (21/sq mi)
- Time zone: UTC+01:00 (CET)
  - Summer (DST): UTC+02:00 (CEST)
- INSEE/Postal code: 54220 /54115
- ^{1} French Land Register data, which excludes lakes, ponds, glaciers > 1 km^{2} (0.386 sq mi or 247 acres) and river estuaries.

Gémonville (French pronunciation: [ʒemɔ̃vil]) is a commune in the Meurthe-et-Moselle department in north-eastern France.

== See also ==
- Communes of the Meurthe-et-Moselle department
