= Gibeaumeix =

- Commune
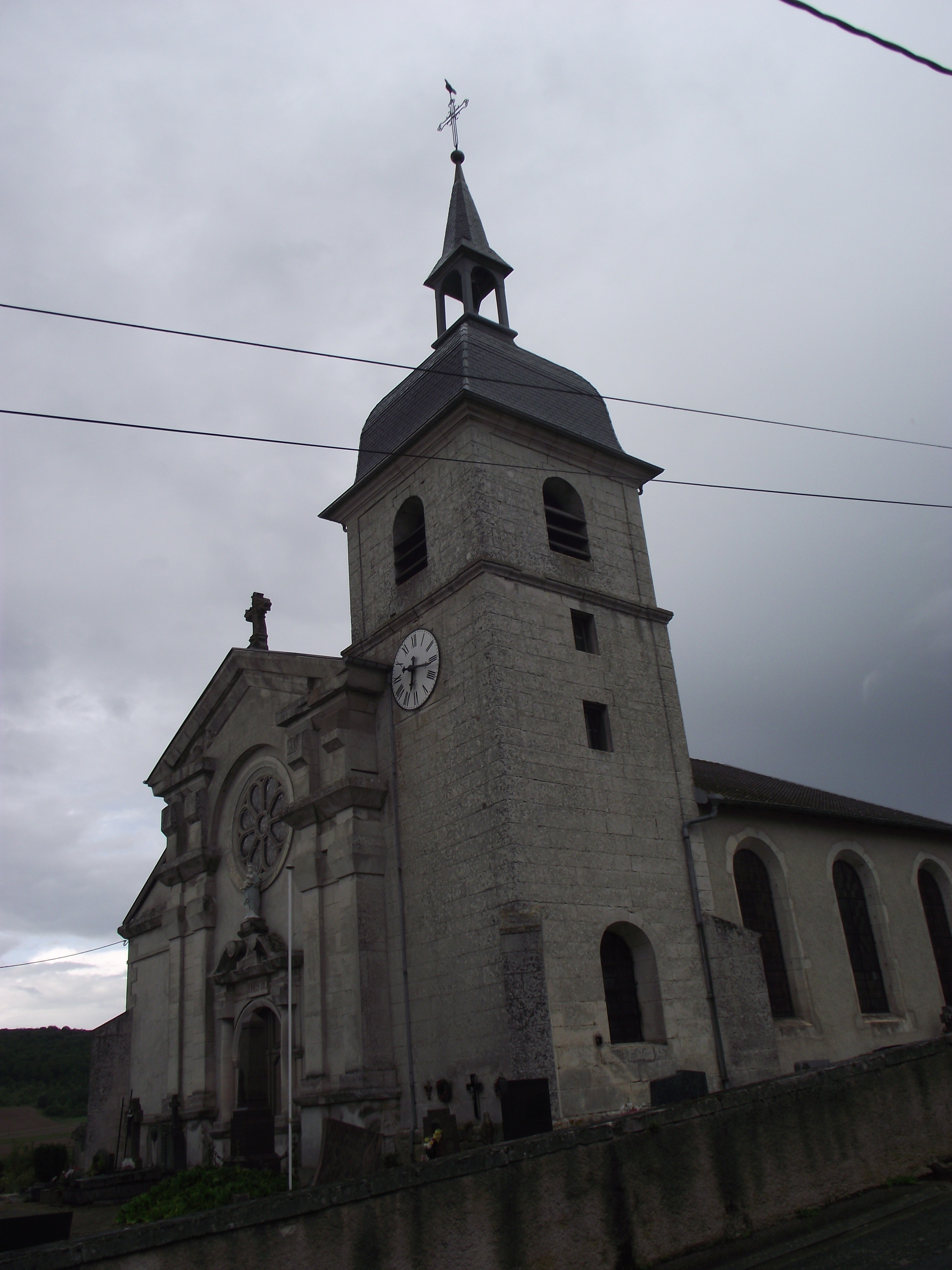
- The church in Gibeaumeix

- Coat of arms
- Location of Gibeaumeix
- Location within France Location within Grand Est
- Coordinates: 48°34′57″N 5°44′00″E
- Country: France
- Region: Grand Est
- Department: Meurthe-et-Moselle
- Arrondissement: Toul
- Canton: Meine au Saintois
- Intercommunality: CC Pays de Colombey et Sud Toulois

Government
  - Mayor (2020–2026): Denis Kieffer
- Area^{1}: 7.8 km^{2} (3.0 sq mi)
- Elevation: 258 m (846 ft)
- Highest elevation: 397 m (1,302 ft)
- Lowest elevation: 252 m (827 ft)
- Population (2023): 177
  - Density: 23/km^{2} (59/sq mi)
- Time zone: UTC+01:00 (CET)
  - Summer (DST): UTC+02:00 (CEST)
- INSEE/Postal code: 54226 /54112
- ^{1} French Land Register data, which excludes lakes, ponds, glaciers > 1 km^{2} (0.386 sq mi or 247 acres) and river estuaries.

Gibeaumeix (French pronunciation: [ʒibomɛ]) is a commune in the Meurthe-et-Moselle department in north-eastern France.

== See also ==
- Communes of the Meurthe-et-Moselle department
