= Bagneux, Meurthe-et-Moselle =

Bagneux
- Commune
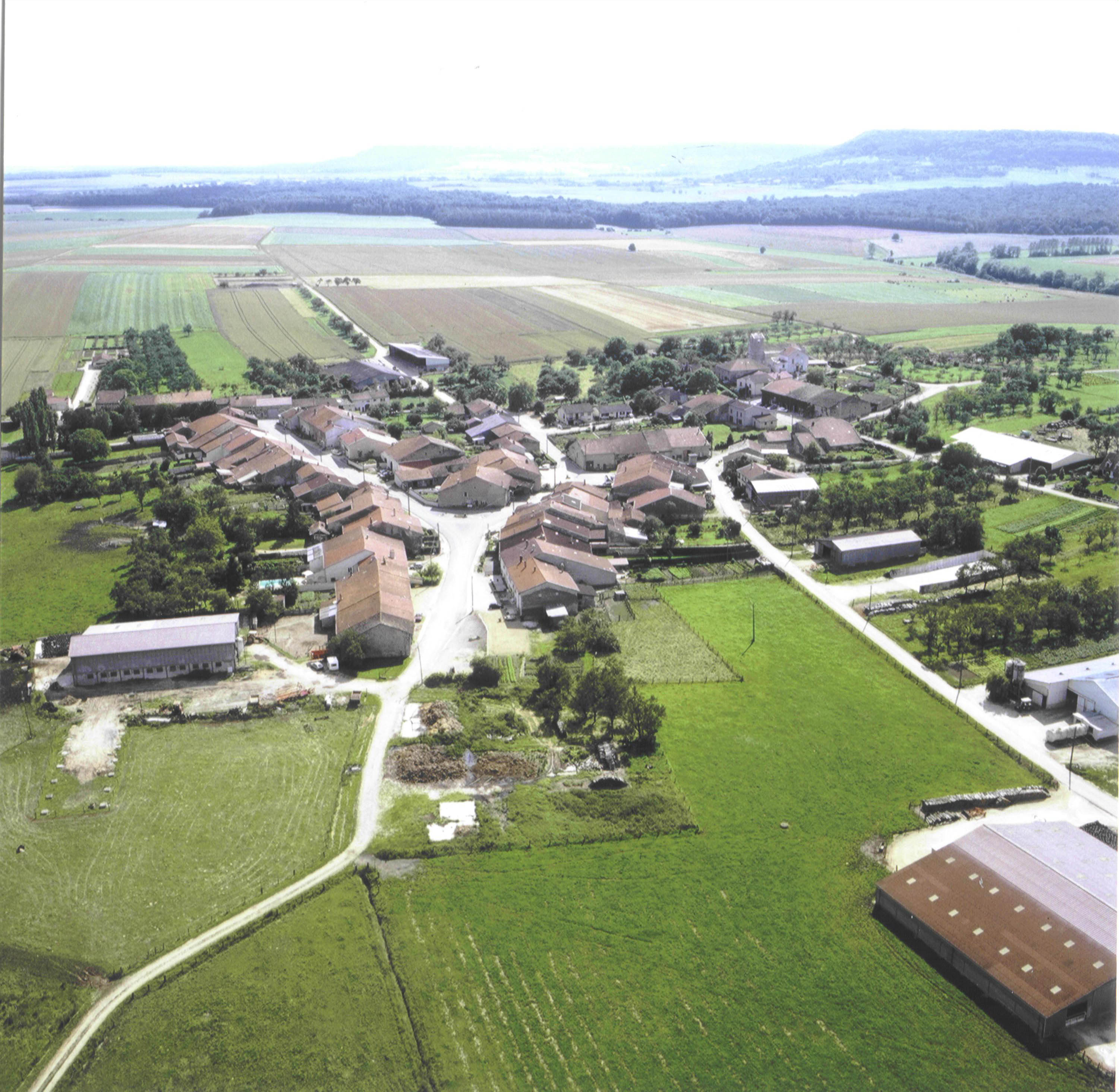
- An aerial view of Bagneux

- Coat of arms
- Location of Bagneux
- Location within France Location within Grand Est
- Coordinates: 48°33′32″N 5°53′00″E
- Country: France
- Region: Grand Est
- Department: Meurthe-et-Moselle
- Arrondissement: Toul
- Canton: Meine au Saintois
- Intercommunality: CC Pays de Colombey et Sud Toulois

Government
  - Mayor (2020–2026): Ludovic Deloche
- Area^{1}: 8.6 km^{2} (3.3 sq mi)
- Elevation: 270 m (890 ft)
- Highest elevation: 306 m (1,004 ft)
- Lowest elevation: 243 m (797 ft)
- Population (2023): 127
  - Density: 15/km^{2} (38/sq mi)
- Time zone: UTC+01:00 (CET)
  - Summer (DST): UTC+02:00 (CEST)
- INSEE/Postal code: 54041 /54170
- ^{1} French Land Register data, which excludes lakes, ponds, glaciers > 1 km^{2} (0.386 sq mi or 247 acres) and river estuaries.

Bagneux (French pronunciation: [baɲø]) is a commune in the Meurthe-et-Moselle department in northeastern France.

== Population ==
Historical population
Year	Pop.	±% p.a.
1968	137	—
1975	135	−0.21%
1982	142	+0.72%
1990	131	−1.00%
1999	132	+0.08%
2007	140	+0.74%
2012	152	+1.66%
2017	160	+1.03%
2023	127	−3.78%
Source: INSEE

== See also ==
- Communes of the Meurthe-et-Moselle department
