= Barisey-la-Côte =

- Commune
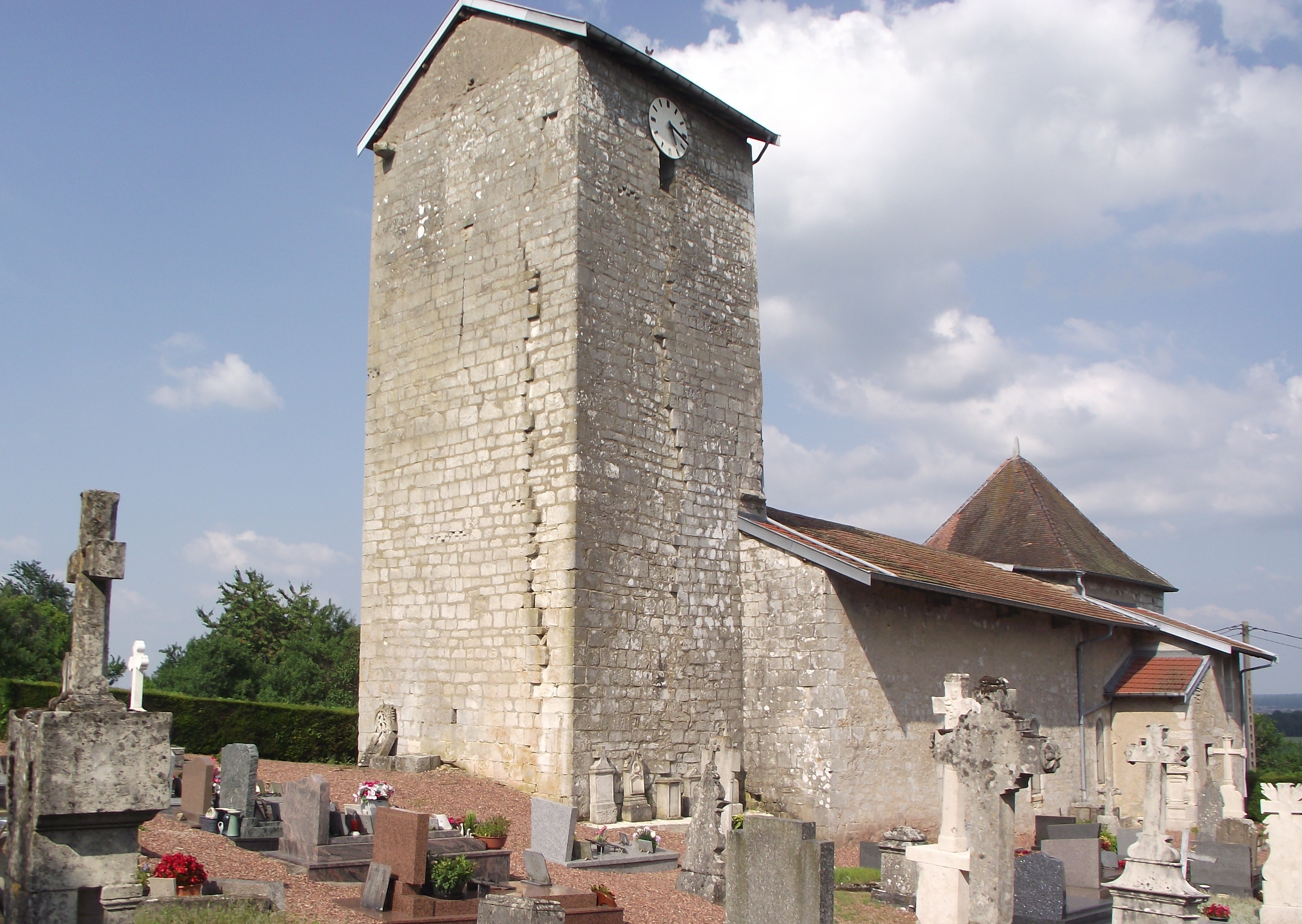
- The church in Barisey-la-Côte

- Coat of arms
- Location of Barisey-la-Côte
- Location within France Location within Grand Est
- Coordinates: 48°32′38″N 5°50′35″E
- Country: France
- Region: Grand Est
- Department: Meurthe-et-Moselle
- Arrondissement: Toul
- Canton: Meine au Saintois
- Intercommunality: CC Pays de Colombey et Sud Toulois

Government
  - Mayor (2020–2026): Charles Francois
- Area^{1}: 3.87 km^{2} (1.49 sq mi)
- Elevation: 279 m (915 ft)
- Highest elevation: 418 m (1,371 ft)
- Lowest elevation: 264 m (866 ft)
- Population (2023): 275
  - Density: 71.1/km^{2} (184/sq mi)
- Time zone: UTC+01:00 (CET)
  - Summer (DST): UTC+02:00 (CEST)
- INSEE/Postal code: 54047 /54170
- ^{1} French Land Register data, which excludes lakes, ponds, glaciers > 1 km^{2} (0.386 sq mi or 247 acres) and river estuaries.

Barisey-la-Côte (French pronunciation: [baʁizɛ la kot]) is a commune in the Meurthe-et-Moselle department in northeastern France.

== Population ==
Historical population
Year	Pop.	±% p.a.
1968	118	—
1975	115	−0.37%
1982	155	+4.36%
1990	156	+0.08%
1999	162	+0.42%
2007	182	+1.47%
2012	211	+3.00%
2017	226	+1.38%
2023	275	+3.32%
Source: INSEE

== See also ==
- Communes of the Meurthe-et-Moselle department
