= Aboncourt, Meurthe-et-Moselle =

Aboncourt
- Commune
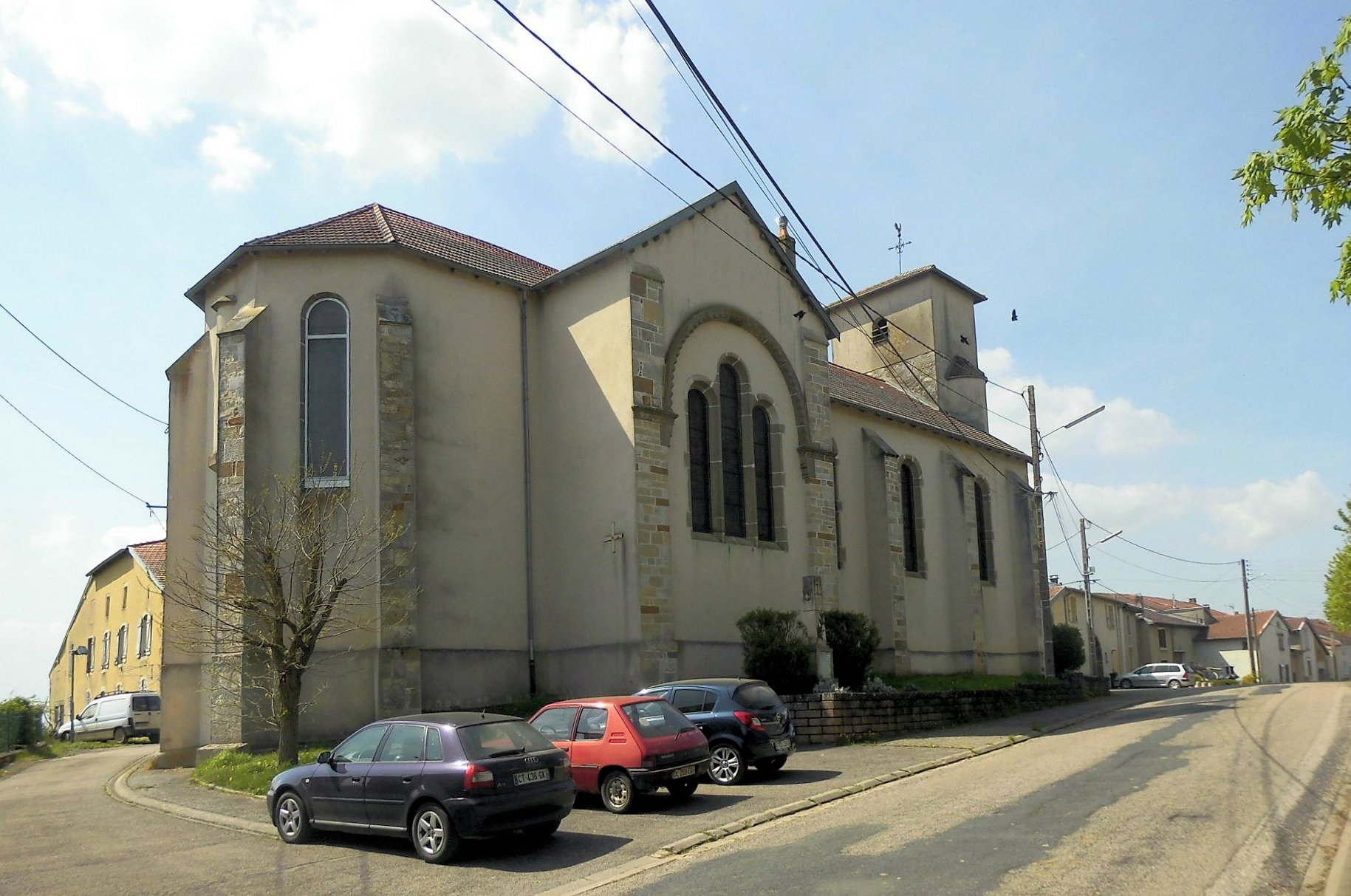
- The church in Aboncourt

- Coat of arms
- Location of Aboncourt
- Location within France Location within Grand Est
- Coordinates: 48°21′32″N 5°58′04″E
- Country: France
- Region: Grand Est
- Department: Meurthe-et-Moselle
- Arrondissement: Toul
- Canton: Meine au Saintois
- Intercommunality: Pays de Colombey et du Sud Toulois

Government
  - Mayor (2020–2026): Eric Mathieu
- Area^{1}: 6.93 km^{2} (2.68 sq mi)
- Elevation: 360 m (1,180 ft)
- Highest elevation: 476 m (1,562 ft)
- Lowest elevation: 324 m (1,063 ft)
- Population (2023): 91
  - Density: 13/km^{2} (34/sq mi)
- Demonym(s): Aboncourtois, Aboncourtoises
- Time zone: UTC+01:00 (CET)
  - Summer (DST): UTC+02:00 (CEST)
- INSEE/Postal code: 54003 /54115
- ^{1} French Land Register data, which excludes lakes, ponds, glaciers > 1 km^{2} (0.386 sq mi or 247 acres) and river estuaries.

Aboncourt (French pronunciation: [abɔ̃kuʁ]) is a commune in the Meurthe-et-Moselle department in northeastern France.

== Population ==
Inhabitants are called Aboncourtois in French.

Historical population

Year	Pop.	±% p.a.
1793	275	—
1821	375	+1.11%
1846	368	−0.08%
1872	300	−0.78%
1901	212	−1.19%
1926	161	−1.09%
1946	141	−0.66%
1962	149	+0.35%
1968	133	−1.88%

Year	Pop.	±% p.a.
1975	136	+0.32%
1982	137	+0.10%
1990	120	−1.64%
1999	123	+0.27%
2007	128	+0.50%
2012	107	−3.52%
2017	103	−0.76%
2023	91	−2.04%

Source: EHESS (1793-1999) and INSEE

== See also ==
- Communes of the Meurthe-et-Moselle department
