= Allain, Meurthe-et-Moselle =

Allain
- Commune
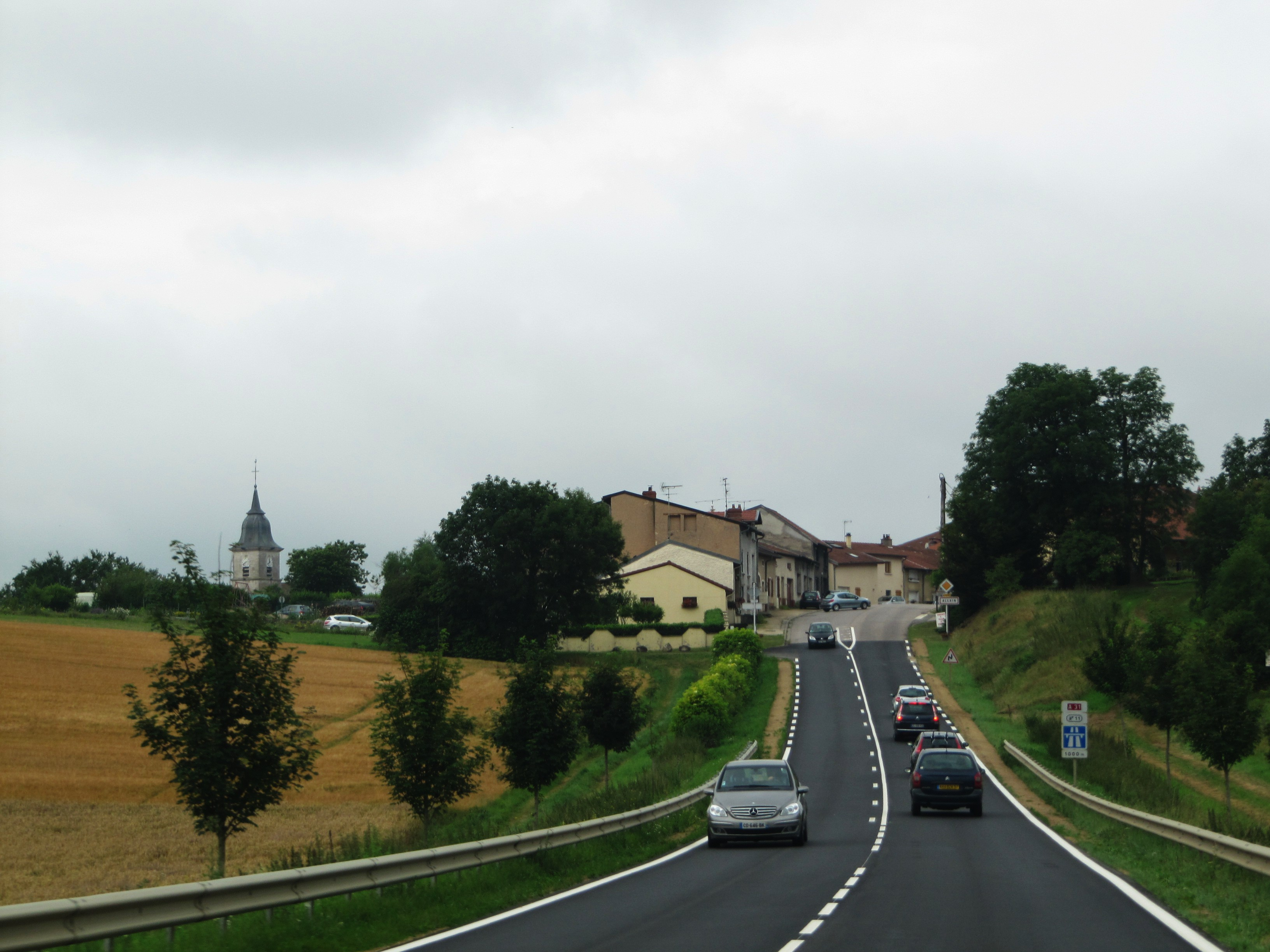
- A general view of Allain

- Coat of arms
- Location of Allain
- Location within France Location within Grand Est
- Coordinates: 48°33′02″N 5°54′41″E
- Country: France
- Region: Grand Est
- Department: Meurthe-et-Moselle
- Arrondissement: Toul
- Canton: Meine au Saintois
- Intercommunality: Pays de Colombey et Sud Toulois

Government
  - Mayor (2020–2026): Emeline Magnier-Caretti
- Area^{1}: 16.48 km^{2} (6.36 sq mi)
- Elevation: 305 m (1,001 ft)
- Highest elevation: 381 m (1,250 ft)
- Lowest elevation: 259 m (850 ft)
- Population (2023): 490
  - Density: 30/km^{2} (77/sq mi)
- Time zone: UTC+01:00 (CET)
  - Summer (DST): UTC+02:00 (CEST)
- INSEE/Postal code: 54008 /54170
- ^{1} French Land Register data, which excludes lakes, ponds, glaciers > 1 km^{2} (0.386 sq mi or 247 acres) and river estuaries.

Allain (French pronunciation: [alɛ̃]) is a commune in the Meurthe-et-Moselle department in northeastern France.

== Population ==
Inhabitants are called Allainois in French.

Historical population
Year	Pop.	±% p.a.
1968	274	—
1975	254	−1.08%
1982	274	+1.09%
1990	353	+3.22%
1999	387	+1.03%
2007	461	+2.21%
2012	464	+0.13%
2017	478	+0.60%
2023	490	+0.41%
Source: INSEE

== See also ==
- Communes of the Meurthe-et-Moselle department
