= Saulxerotte =

- Commune
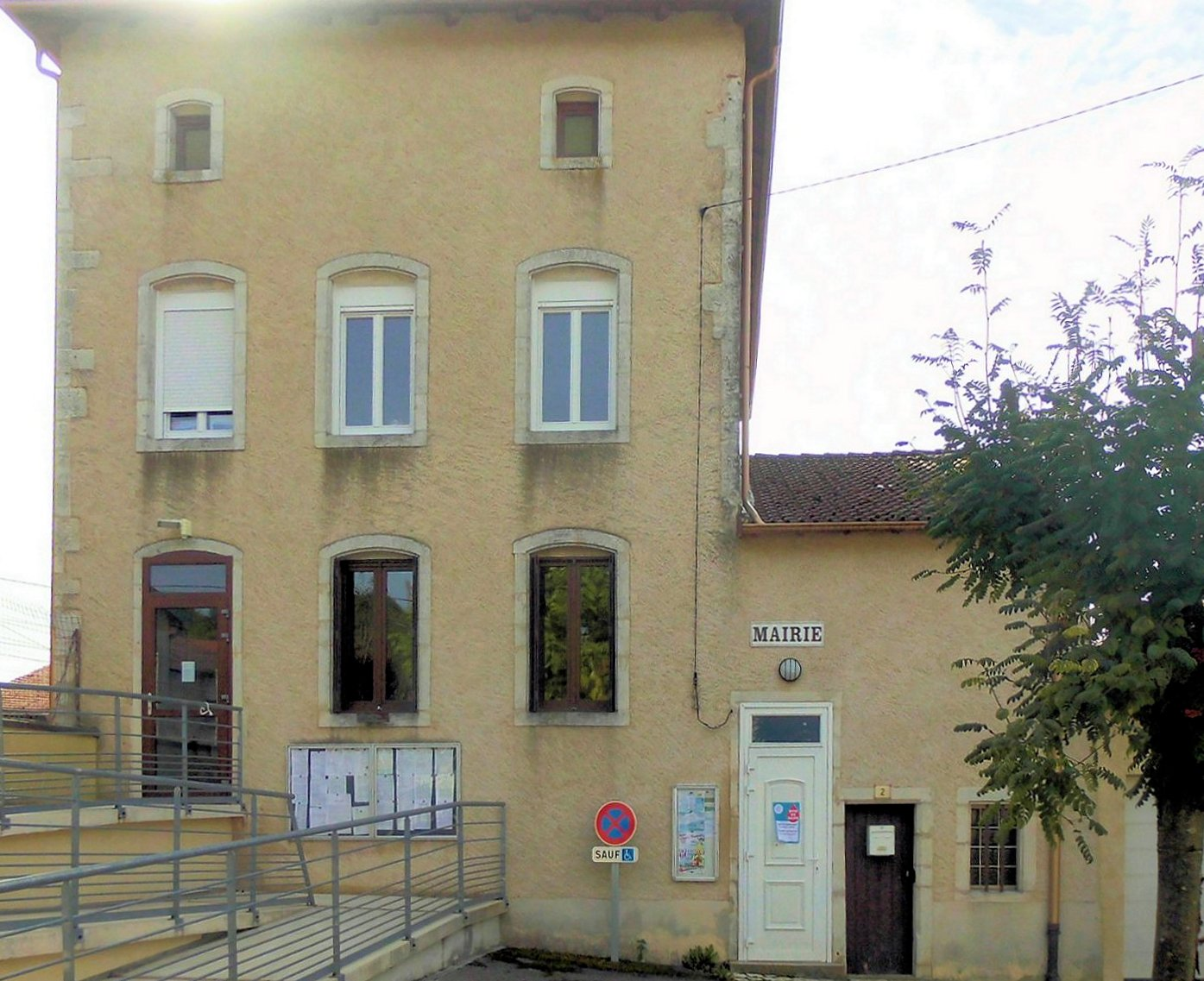
- The town hall in Saulxerotte

- Coat of arms
- Location of Saulxerotte
- Location within France Location within Grand Est
- Coordinates: 48°28′14″N 5°56′43″E
- Country: France
- Region: Grand Est
- Department: Meurthe-et-Moselle
- Arrondissement: Toul
- Canton: Meine au Saintois
- Intercommunality: CC Pays de Colombey et Sud Toulois

Government
  - Mayor (2020–2026): Céline Bouvot
- Area^{1}: 3.15 km^{2} (1.22 sq mi)
- Elevation: 350 m (1,150 ft)
- Highest elevation: 403 m (1,322 ft)
- Lowest elevation: 318 m (1,043 ft)
- Population (2023): 104
  - Density: 33.0/km^{2} (85.5/sq mi)
- Time zone: UTC+01:00 (CET)
  - Summer (DST): UTC+02:00 (CEST)
- INSEE/Postal code: 54494 /54115
- ^{1} French Land Register data, which excludes lakes, ponds, glaciers > 1 km^{2} (0.386 sq mi or 247 acres) and river estuaries.

Saulxerotte is a commune in the Meurthe-et-Moselle department in north-eastern France.

== See also ==
- Communes of the Meurthe-et-Moselle department
