= Favières, Meurthe-et-Moselle =

Favières
- Commune
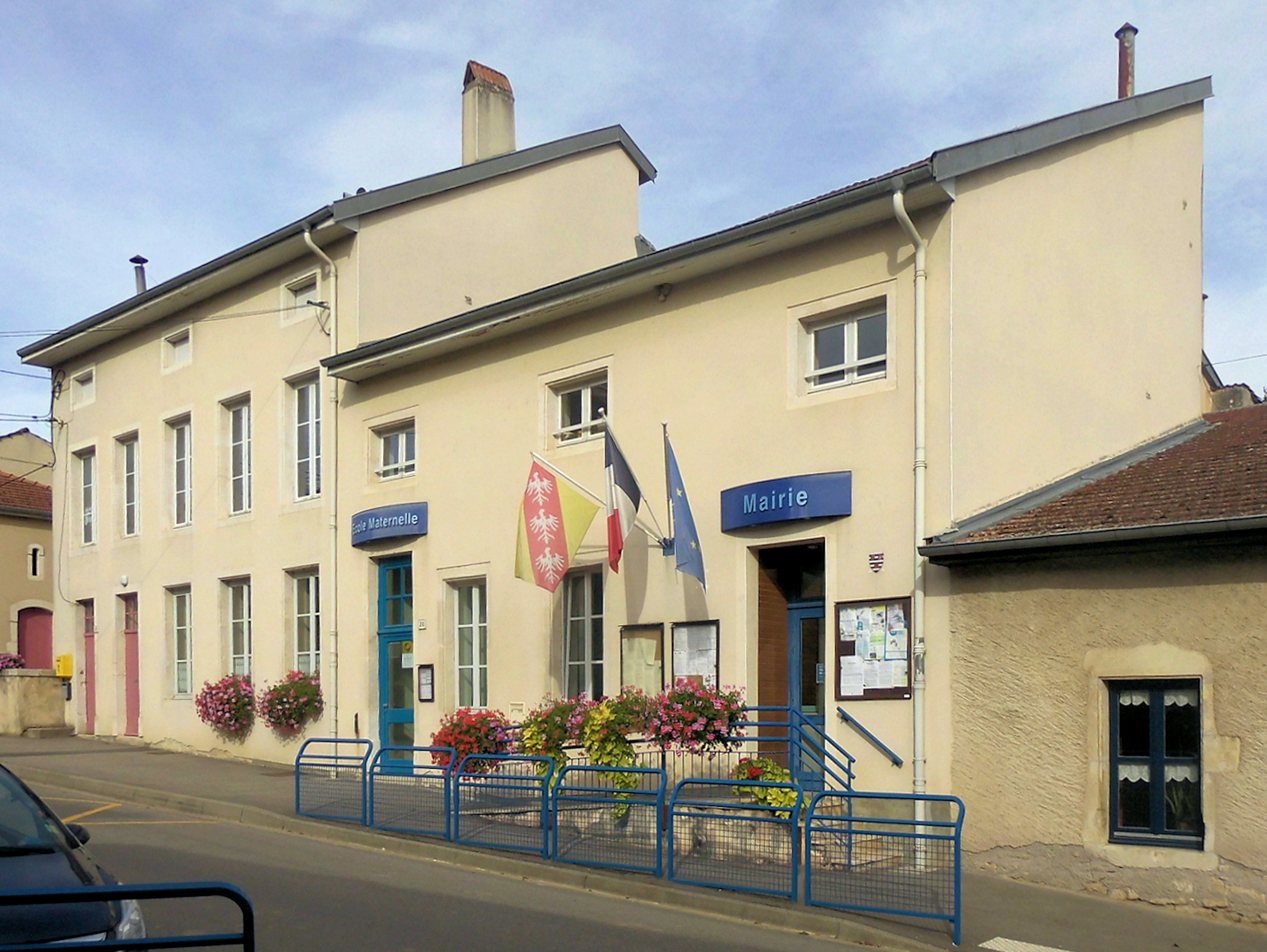
- The town hall and school in Favières

- Coat of arms
- Location of Favières
- Location within France Location within Grand Est
- Coordinates: 48°27′48″N 5°57′19″E
- Country: France
- Region: Grand Est
- Department: Meurthe-et-Moselle
- Arrondissement: Toul
- Canton: Meine au Saintois
- Intercommunality: CC Pays de Colombey et Sud Toulois

Government
  - Mayor (2020–2026): Valerie Hoffmann
- Area^{1}: 29.5 km^{2} (11.4 sq mi)
- Elevation: 337 m (1,106 ft)
- Highest elevation: 471 m (1,545 ft)
- Lowest elevation: 308 m (1,010 ft)
- Population (2023): 572
  - Density: 19.4/km^{2} (50.2/sq mi)
- Time zone: UTC+01:00 (CET)
  - Summer (DST): UTC+02:00 (CEST)
- INSEE/Postal code: 54189 /54115
- ^{1} French Land Register data, which excludes lakes, ponds, glaciers > 1 km^{2} (0.386 sq mi or 247 acres) and river estuaries.

Favières (French pronunciation: [favjɛʁ]) is a commune in the Meurthe-et-Moselle department in north-eastern France.

== See also ==
- Communes of the Meurthe-et-Moselle department
