= Canton of Domèvre-en-Haye =

Former canton in Meurthe-et-Moselle, France

Coordinates: 48°48′55″N 5°53′41″E

- Former canton
- Location of the canton in the arrondissement of Toul
- Country: France
- Region: Grand Est
- Department: Meurthe-et-Moselle
- No. of communes: {{{nbcomm}}}
- Disbanded: 2015

Government
  - Representatives: Jean Loctin
- Area: 268.83 km^{2} (103.80 sq mi)
- Population (2012): 13,736
  - Density: 51.095/km^{2} (132.34/sq mi)

The canton of Domèvre-en-Haye (French: Canton de Domèvre-en-Haye) is a former French canton located in the department of Meurthe-et-Moselle in the Lorraine region (now part of Grand Est). This canton was organized around Domèvre-en-Haye in the arrondissement of Toul. It is now part of the canton of Le Nord-Toulois.

The last general councillor from this canton was Jean Loctin (DVD), elected in 1994.

== Composition ==
The canton of Domèvre-en-Haye grouped together 27 municipalities and had 13,736 inhabitants (2012 census without double counts).

1. Andilly
2. Ansauville
3. Avrainville
4. Beaumont
5. Bernécourt
6. Domèvre-en-Haye
7. Francheville
8. Gézoncourt
9. Griscourt
10. Grosrouvres
11. Hamonville
12. Jaillon
13. Liverdun
14. Mamey
15. Mandres-aux-Quatre-Tours
16. Manoncourt-en-Woëvre
17. Manonville
18. Martincourt
19. Minorville
20. Noviant-aux-Prés
21. Rogéville
22. Rosières-en-Haye
23. Royaumeix
24. Tremblecourt
25. Velaine-en-Haye
26. Villers-en-Haye
27. Villey-Saint-Étienne
