= Canton of Toul-Nord =

Former canton in Meurthe-et-Moselle, France

Coordinates: 48°41′01″N 5°48′17″E

- Former canton
- Location of the canton in the arrondissement of Toul
- Country: France
- Region: Grand Est
- Department: Meurthe-et-Moselle
- No. of communes: {{{nbcomm}}}
- Disbanded: 2015

Government
  - Representatives: Michèle Pilot
- Population (2012): 28,036

The canton of Toul-Nord (French: Canton de Toul-Nord) is a former French canton located in the department of Meurthe-et-Moselle in the Lorraine region (now part of Grand Est). It is now part of the canton of Toul and canton of Le Nord-Toulois.

The last general councillor from this canton was Michèle Pilot (PS), elected in 2001.

== Composition ==
The canton of Toul-Nord was made up of a fraction of the commune of Toul and 18 other communes and had 28,036 inhabitants (2012 census without double counts).

1. Aingeray
2. Boucq
3. Bouvron
4. Bruley
5. Dommartin-lès-Toul
6. Écrouves
7. Fontenoy-sur-Moselle
8. Foug
9. Gondreville
10. Lagney
11. Laneuveville-derrière-Foug
12. Lay-Saint-Remy
13. Lucey
14. Ménil-la-Tour
15. Pagney-derrière-Barine
16. Sanzey
17. Sexey-les-Bois
18. Toul
19. Trondes
