= Bouvron =

Bouvron is the name of the following communes in France:

- Bouvron, Loire-Atlantique, in the Loire-Atlantique department
- Bouvron, Meurthe-et-Moselle, in the Meurthe-et-Moselle department
