= Avrainville =

Avrainville is the name of three communes in France:

- Avrainville, Meurthe-et-Moselle
- Avrainville, Vosges
- Avrainville, Essonne
