= Xammes =

- Commune
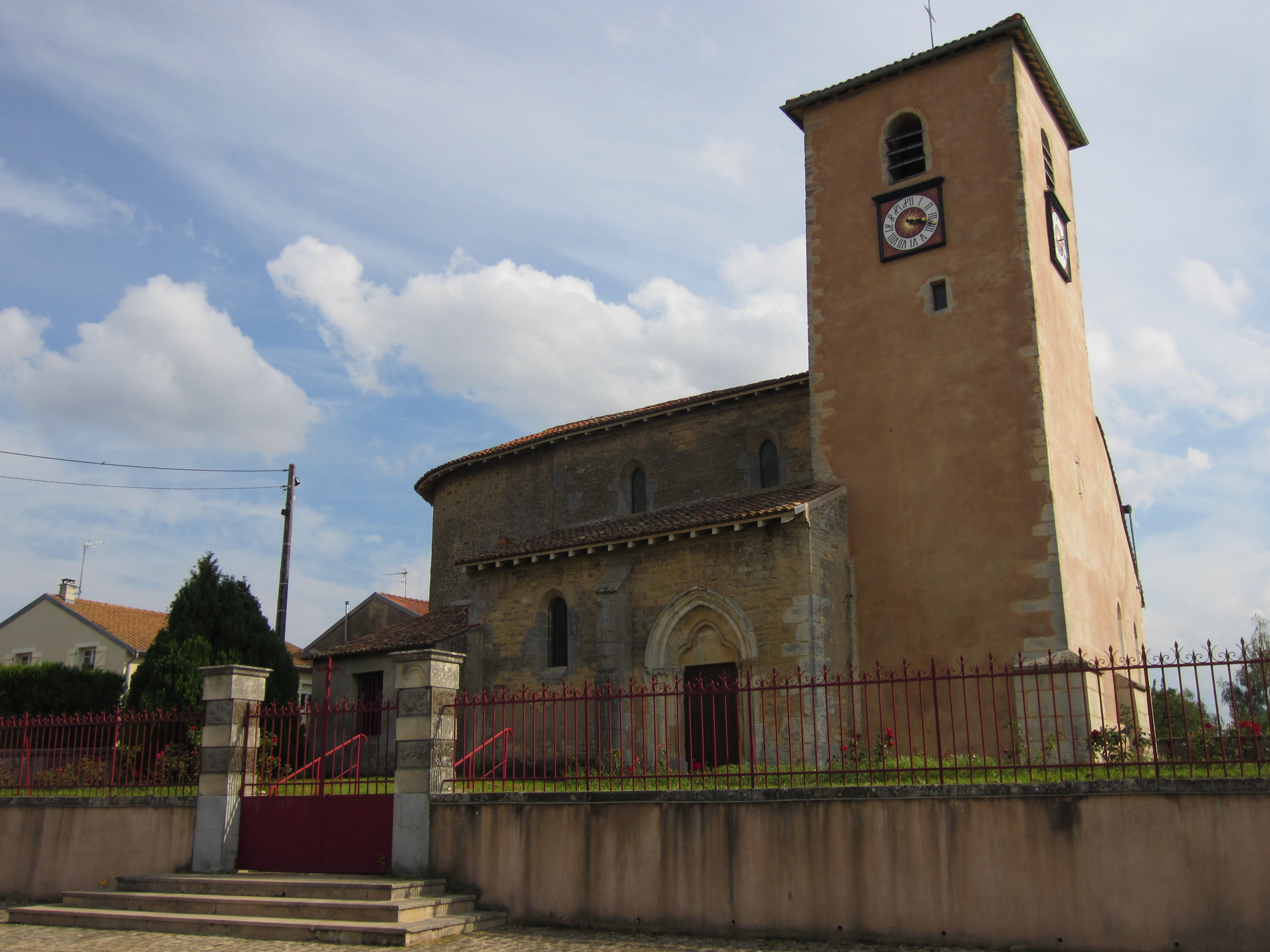
- The Saint-Clément church in Xammes

- Coat of arms
- Location of Xammes
- Location within France Location within Grand Est
- Coordinates: 48°58′32″N 5°51′19″E
- Country: France
- Region: Grand Est
- Department: Meurthe-et-Moselle
- Arrondissement: Toul
- Canton: Le Nord-Toulois
- Intercommunality: Mad et Moselle

Government
  - Mayor (2023–2026): Didier Thiery
- Area^{1}: 8.16 km^{2} (3.15 sq mi)
- Elevation: 250 m (820 ft)
- Highest elevation: 280 m (920 ft)
- Lowest elevation: 208 m (682 ft)
- Population (2023): 174
  - Density: 21.3/km^{2} (55.2/sq mi)
- Time zone: UTC+01:00 (CET)
  - Summer (DST): UTC+02:00 (CEST)
- INSEE/Postal code: 54594 /54470
- ^{1} French Land Register data, which excludes lakes, ponds, glaciers > 1 km^{2} (0.386 sq mi or 247 acres) and river estuaries.

Xammes is a commune in the Meurthe-et-Moselle department in north-eastern France.

== History ==
It may have been the village Scannis mentioned in charters since 776. The church of Saint-Clément dates back to the 12th century.

== Population ==
Historical population
Year	Pop.	±% p.a.
1968	131	—
1975	102	−3.51%
1982	105	+0.41%
1990	122	+1.89%
1999	121	−0.09%
2007	125	+0.41%
2012	129	+0.63%
2017	153	+3.47%
2023	174	+2.17%
Source: INSEE

== See also ==
- Communes of the Meurthe-et-Moselle department
- Parc naturel régional de Lorraine
