= Arrondissement of Toul =

Coordinates: 48°41′N 5°53′E

Toul
- Arrondissement
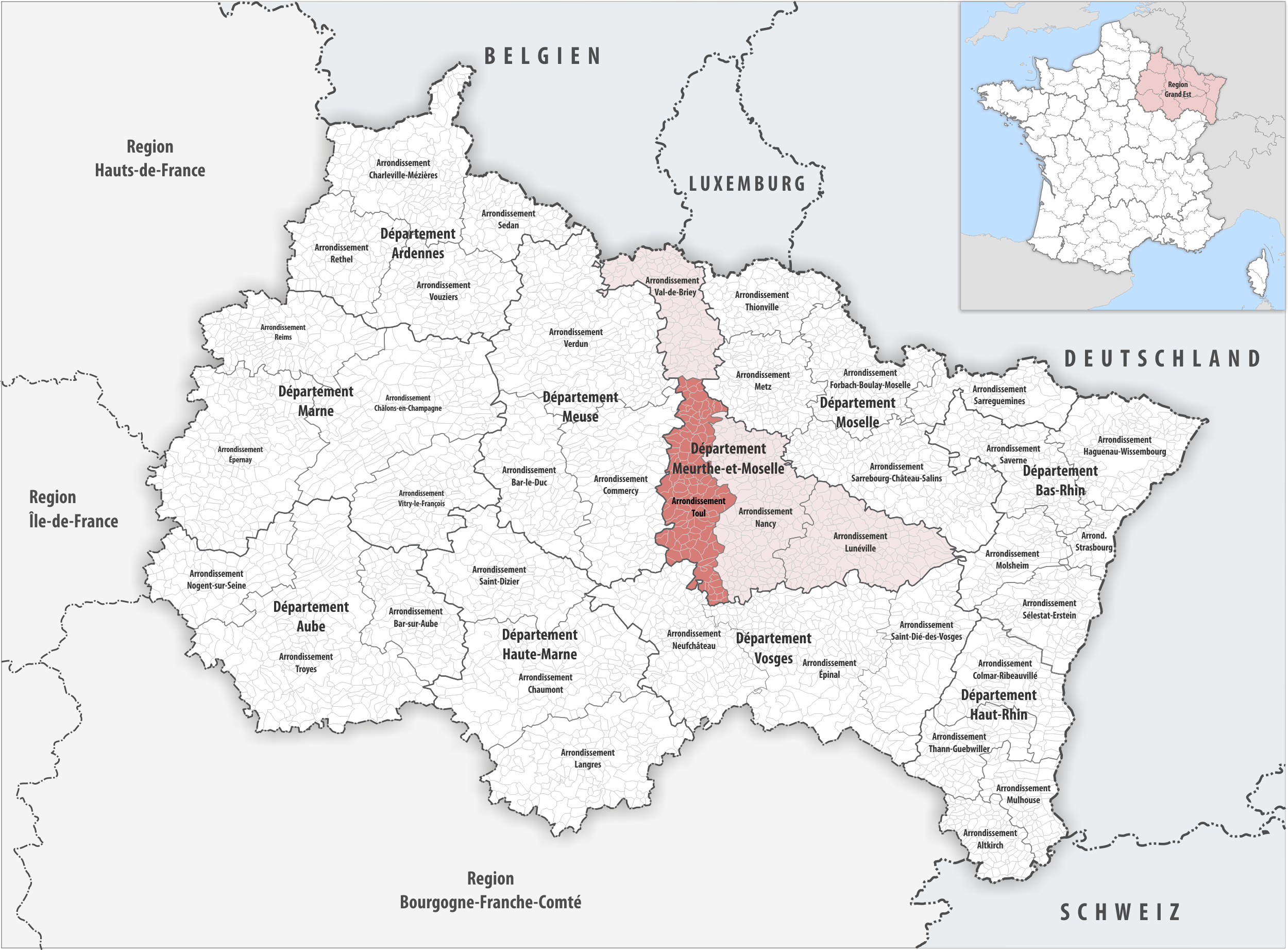
- Location within the region Grand Est
- Country: France
- Region: Grand Est
- Department: Meurthe-et-Moselle
- No. of communes: {{{nbcomm}}}
- Area: 1,205.5 km^{2} (465.4 sq mi)
- Population (2023): 65,532
  - Density: 54.361/km^{2} (140.79/sq mi)
- INSEE code: 544

The arrondissement of Toul is an arrondissement of France in the Meurthe-et-Moselle department in the Grand Est region. It has 118 communes. Its population is 65,665 (2021), and its area is 1,205.5 km^{2} (465.4 sq mi).

== Composition ==
The communes of the arrondissement of Toul, and their INSEE codes, are:

1. Aboncourt (54003)
2. Aingeray (54007)
3. Allain (54008)
4. Allamps (54010)
5. Andilly (54016)
6. Ansauville (54019)
7. Arnaville (54022)
8. Avrainville (54034)
9. Bagneux (54041)
10. Barisey-au-Plain (54046)
11. Barisey-la-Côte (54047)
12. Battigny (54052)
13. Bayonville-sur-Mad (54055)
14. Beaumont (54057)
15. Bernécourt (54063)
16. Beuvezin (54068)
17. Bicqueley (54073)
18. Blénod-lès-Toul (54080)
19. Bois-de-Haye (54557)
20. Boucq (54086)
21. Bouillonville (54087)
22. Bouvron (54088)
23. Bruley (54102)
24. Bulligny (54105)
25. Chambley-Bussières (54112)
26. Charey (54119)
27. Charmes-la-Côte (54120)
28. Chaudeney-sur-Moselle (54122)
29. Choloy-Ménillot (54128)
30. Colombey-les-Belles (54135)
31. Courcelles (54140)
32. Crépey (54143)
33. Crézilles (54146)
34. Dampvitoux (54153)
35. Dolcourt (54158)
36. Domèvre-en-Haye (54160)
37. Domgermain (54162)
38. Dommartin-la-Chaussée (54166)
39. Dommartin-lès-Toul (54167)
40. Écrouves (54174)
41. Essey-et-Maizerais (54182)
42. Euvezin (54187)
43. Favières (54189)
44. Fécocourt (54190)
45. Fey-en-Haye (54193)
46. Flirey (54200)
47. Fontenoy-sur-Moselle (54202)
48. Foug (54205)
49. Francheville (54208)
50. Gélaucourt (54218)
51. Gémonville (54220)
52. Germiny (54223)
53. Gibeaumeix (54226)
54. Gondreville (54232)
55. Grimonviller (54237)
56. Grosrouvres (54240)
57. Gye (54242)
58. Hagéville (54244)
59. Hamonville (54248)
60. Hannonville-Suzémont (54249)
61. Jaillon (54272)
62. Jaulny (54275)
63. Lagney (54288)
64. Laneuveville-derrière-Foug (54298)
65. Lay-Saint-Remy (54306)
66. Limey-Remenauville (54316)
67. Lironville (54317)
68. Lucey (54327)
69. Mamey (54340)
70. Mandres-aux-Quatre-Tours (54343)
71. Manoncourt-en-Woëvre (54346)
72. Manonville (54348)
73. Mars-la-Tour (54353)
74. Ménil-la-Tour (54360)
75. Minorville (54370)
76. Mont-l'Étroit (54379)
77. Mont-le-Vignoble (54380)
78. Moutrot (54392)
79. Noviant-aux-Prés (54404)
80. Ochey (54405)
81. Onville (54410)
82. Pagney-derrière-Barine (54414)
83. Pannes (54416)
84. Pierre-la-Treiche (54426)
85. Prény (54435)
86. Pulney (54438)
87. Puxieux (54441)
88. Rembercourt-sur-Mad (54453)
89. Royaumeix (54466)
90. Saint-Baussant (54470)
91. Saint-Julien-lès-Gorze (54477)
92. Sanzey (54492)
93. Saulxerotte (54494)
94. Saulxures-lès-Vannes (54496)
95. Seicheprey (54499)
96. Selaincourt (54500)
97. Sponville (54511)
98. Thiaucourt-Regniéville (54518)
99. Thuilley-aux-Groseilles (54523)
100. Toul (54528)
101. Tramont-Émy (54529)
102. Tramont-Lassus (54530)
103. Tramont-Saint-André (54531)
104. Tremblecourt (54532)
105. Trondes (54534)
106. Tronville (54535)
107. Uruffe (54538)
108. Vandelainville (54544)
109. Vandeléville (54545)
110. Vannes-le-Châtel (54548)
111. Viéville-en-Haye (54564)
112. Vilcey-sur-Trey (54566)
113. Villecey-sur-Mad (54570)
114. Villey-le-Sec (54583)
115. Villey-Saint-Étienne (54584)
116. Waville (54593)
117. Xammes (54594)
118. Xonville (54599)

== History ==
The arrondissement of Toul was created as part of the department Meurthe in 1800, and became part of the department Meurthe-et-Moselle in 1871. It was disbanded in 1926, and restored in 1943. In January 2023, it gained 13 communes from the arrondissement of Briey and two from the arrondissement of Nancy, and it lost eight communes to the arrondissement of Nancy.

As a result of the reorganisation of the cantons of France which came into effect in 2015, the borders of the cantons are no longer related to the borders of the arrondissements. The cantons of the arrondissement of Toul were, as of January 2015:

1. Colombey-les-Belles
2. Domèvre-en-Haye
3. Thiaucourt-Regniéville
4. Toul-Nord
5. Toul-Sud
