= Dommartin-la-Chaussée =

- Commune
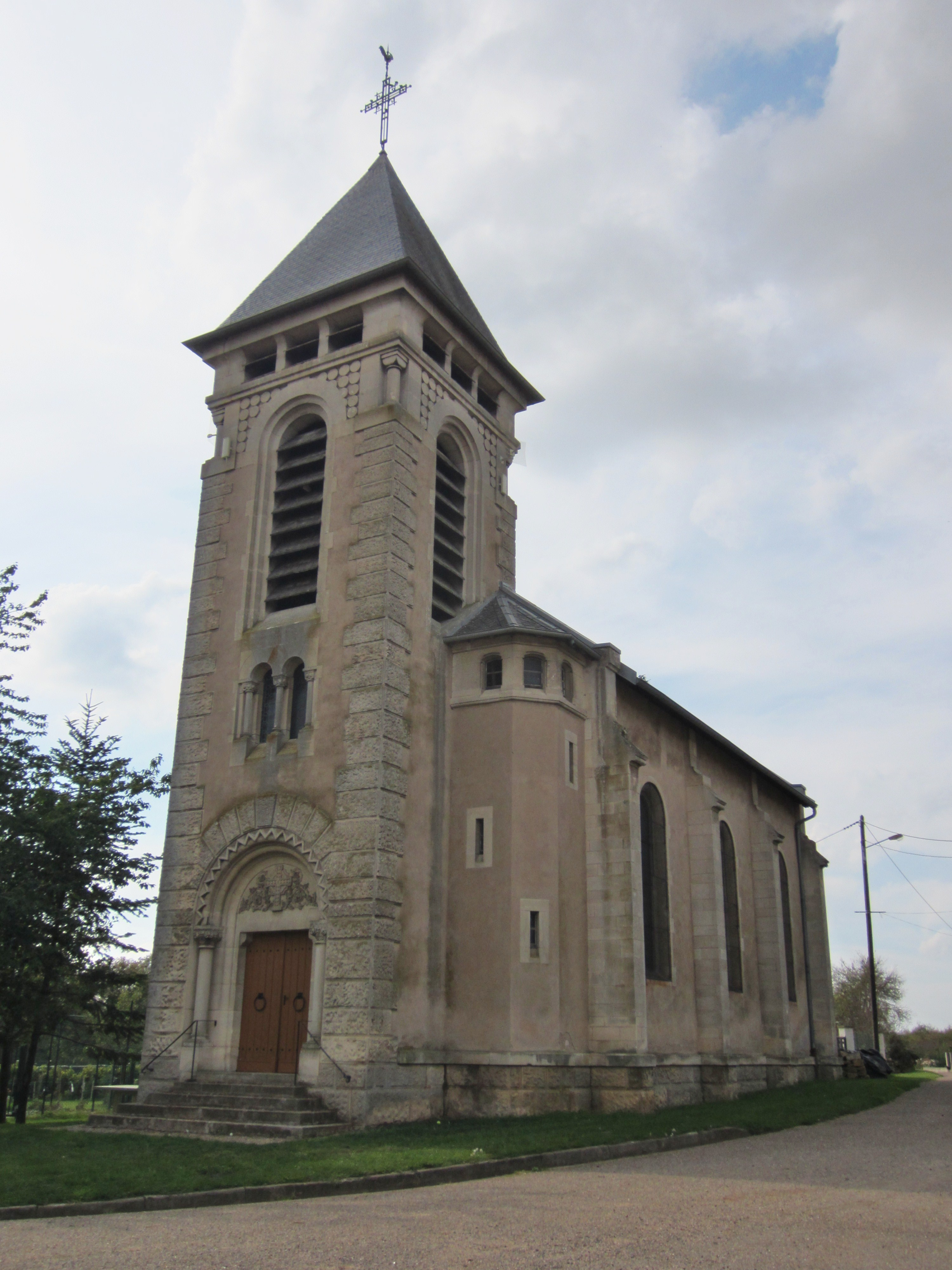
- The church in Dommartin-la-Chaussée

- Coat of arms
- Location of Dommartin-la-Chaussée
- Location within France Location within Grand Est
- Coordinates: 49°00′43″N 5°51′46″E
- Country: France
- Region: Grand Est
- Department: Meurthe-et-Moselle
- Arrondissement: Toul
- Canton: Le Nord-Toulois
- Intercommunality: Mad et Moselle

Government
  - Mayor (2020–2026): Denis Petit
- Area^{1}: 2.71 km^{2} (1.05 sq mi)
- Elevation: 240 m (790 ft)
- Highest elevation: 262 m (860 ft)
- Lowest elevation: 224 m (735 ft)
- Population (2023): 29
  - Density: 11/km^{2} (28/sq mi)
- Time zone: UTC+01:00 (CET)
  - Summer (DST): UTC+02:00 (CEST)
- INSEE/Postal code: 54166 /54470
- ^{1} French Land Register data, which excludes lakes, ponds, glaciers > 1 km^{2} (0.386 sq mi or 247 acres) and river estuaries.

Dommartin-la-Chaussée (French pronunciation: [dɔmaʁtɛ̃ la ʃose]) is a commune in the Meurthe-et-Moselle department in north-eastern France.

== Demography ==
Historical population
Year	Pop.	±% p.a.
1968	32	—
1975	23	−4.61%
1982	23	+0.00%
1990	17	−3.71%
1999	36	+8.69%
2007	48	+3.66%
2012	39	−4.07%
2017	34	−2.71%
2023	29	−2.62%
Source: INSEE

== See also ==
- Communes of the Meurthe-et-Moselle department
- Parc naturel régional de Lorraine
