= Lironville =

- Commune
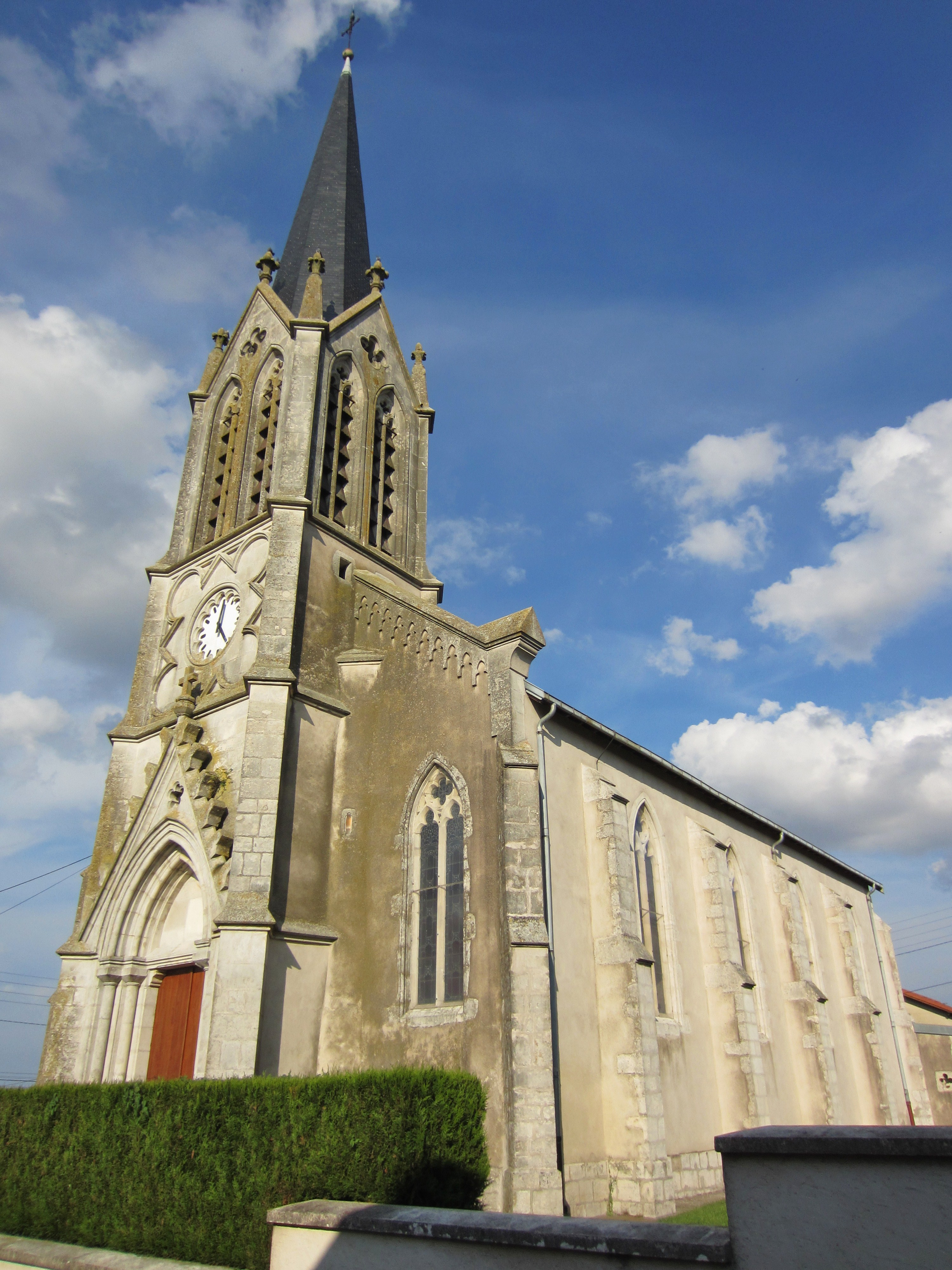
- The church in Lironville

- Coat of arms
- Location of Lironville
- Location within France Location within Grand Est
- Coordinates: 48°52′09″N 5°54′29″E
- Country: France
- Region: Grand Est
- Department: Meurthe-et-Moselle
- Arrondissement: Toul
- Canton: Le Nord-Toulois
- Intercommunality: Mad et Moselle

Government
  - Mayor (2020–2026): Edith Rambour
- Area^{1}: 8.99 km^{2} (3.47 sq mi)
- Elevation: 316 m (1,037 ft)
- Highest elevation: 319 m (1,047 ft)
- Lowest elevation: 217 m (712 ft)
- Population (2023): 131
  - Density: 14.6/km^{2} (37.7/sq mi)
- Time zone: UTC+01:00 (CET)
  - Summer (DST): UTC+02:00 (CEST)
- INSEE/Postal code: 54317 /54470
- ^{1} French Land Register data, which excludes lakes, ponds, glaciers > 1 km^{2} (0.386 sq mi or 247 acres) and river estuaries.

Lironville (French pronunciation: [liʁɔ̃vil]) is a commune in the Meurthe-et-Moselle department in north-eastern France.

== See also ==
- Communes of the Meurthe-et-Moselle department
- Parc naturel régional de Lorraine
