= Mamey, Meurthe-et-Moselle =

Mamey
- Commune
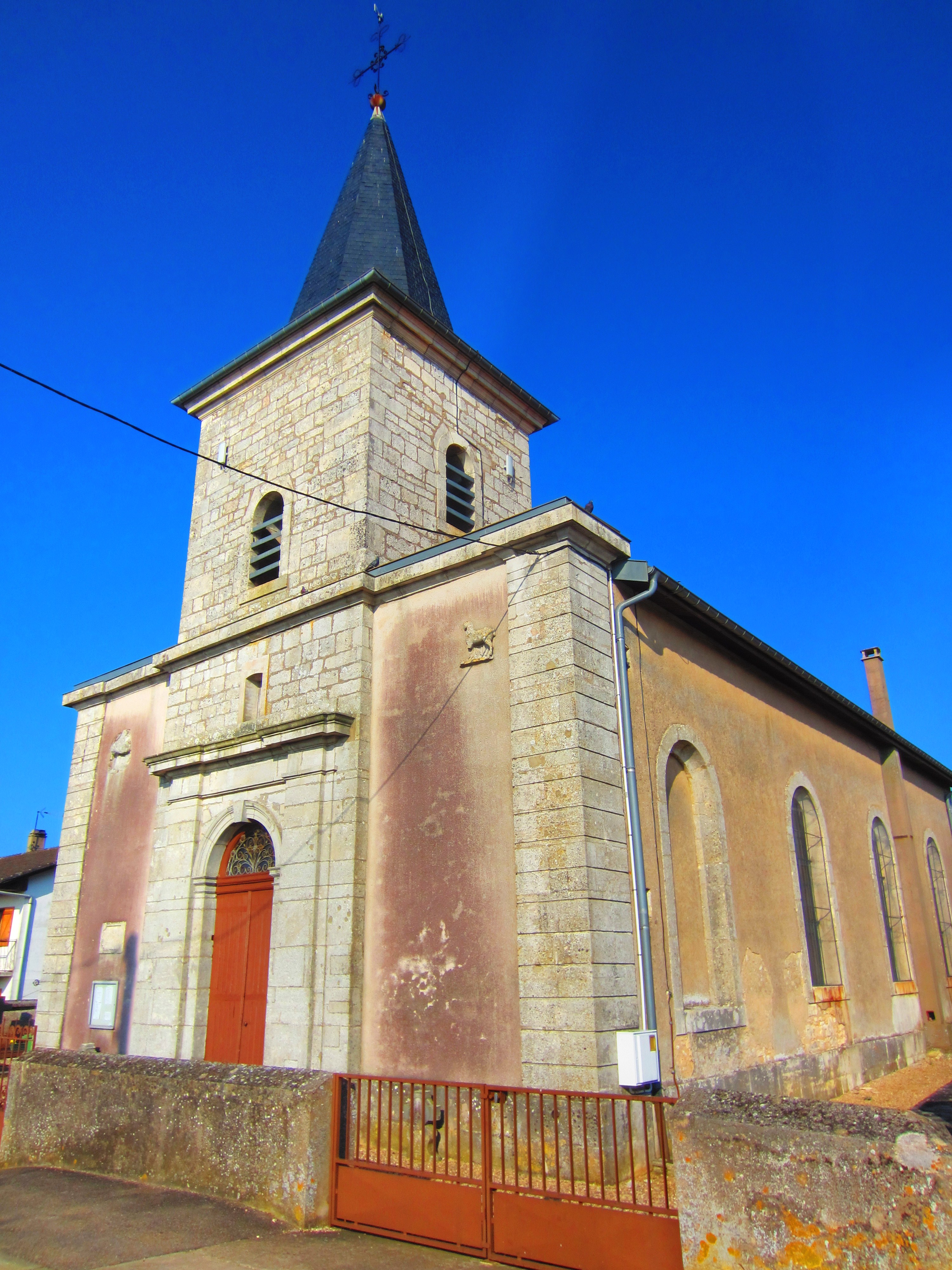
- The church in Mamey

- Coat of arms
- Location of Mamey
- Location within France Location within Grand Est
- Coordinates: 48°52′44″N 5°57′35″E
- Country: France
- Region: Grand Est
- Department: Meurthe-et-Moselle
- Arrondissement: Toul
- Canton: Le Nord-Toulois

Government
  - Mayor (2020–2026): Charles-Henry Aubriot
- Area^{1}: 7.56 km^{2} (2.92 sq mi)
- Elevation: 328 m (1,076 ft)
- Highest elevation: 354 m (1,161 ft)
- Lowest elevation: 229 m (751 ft)
- Population (2023): 333
  - Density: 44.0/km^{2} (114/sq mi)
- Time zone: UTC+01:00 (CET)
  - Summer (DST): UTC+02:00 (CEST)
- INSEE/Postal code: 54340 /54470
- ^{1} French Land Register data, which excludes lakes, ponds, glaciers > 1 km^{2} (0.386 sq mi or 247 acres) and river estuaries.

Mamey (French pronunciation: [mamɛ]) is a commune in the Meurthe-et-Moselle department in north-eastern France.

== See also ==
- Communes of the Meurthe-et-Moselle department
- Parc naturel régional de Lorraine
