= Beaumont, Meurthe-et-Moselle =

Beaumont
- Commune
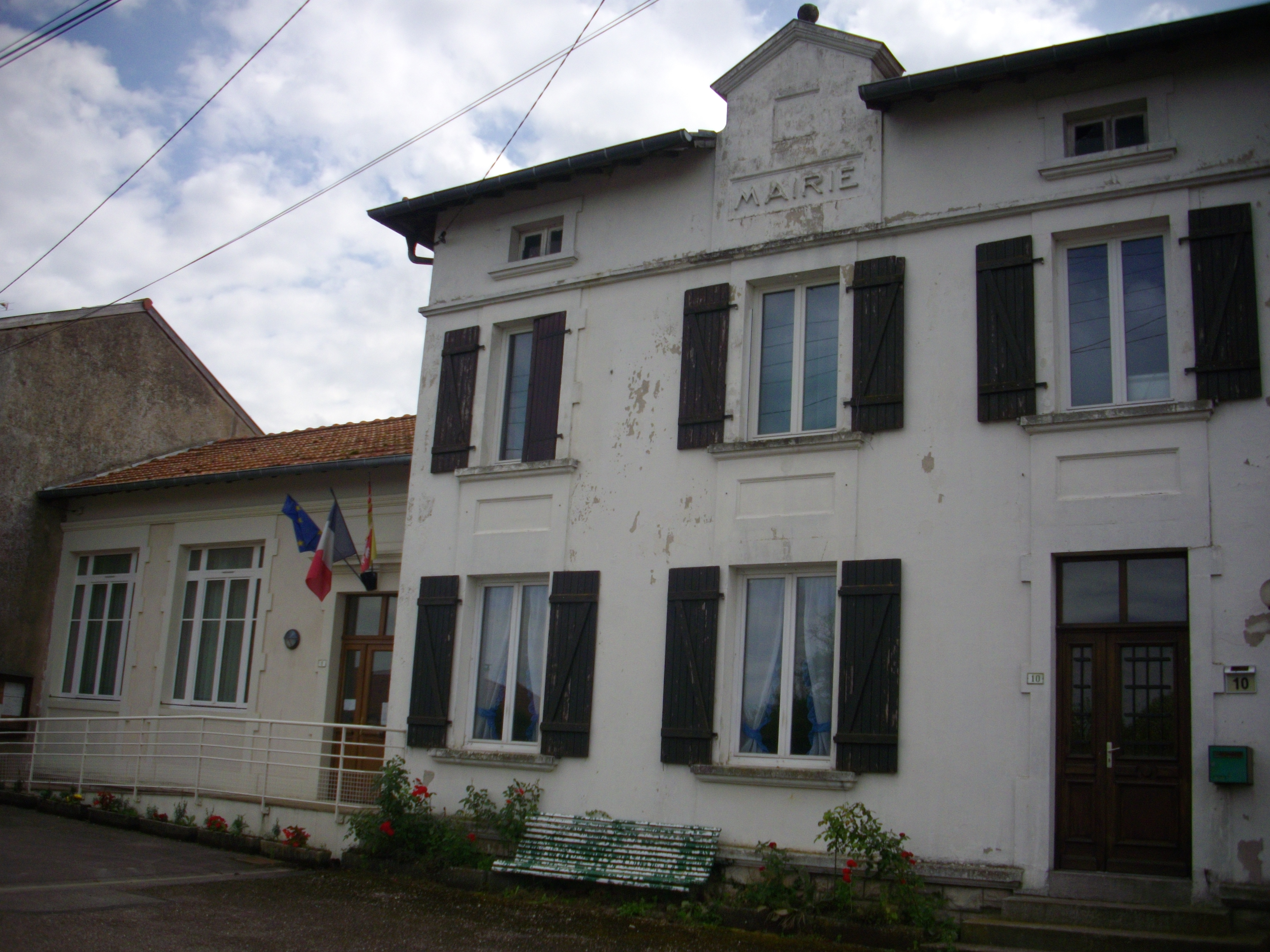
- The town hall in Beaumont

- Coat of arms
- Location of Beaumont
- Location within France Location within Grand Est
- Coordinates: 48°51′09″N 5°47′18″E
- Country: France
- Region: Grand Est
- Department: Meurthe-et-Moselle
- Arrondissement: Toul
- Canton: Le Nord-Toulois
- Intercommunality: Mad et Moselle

Government
  - Mayor (2020–2026): Christophe Ciolli
- Area^{1}: 3.11 km^{2} (1.20 sq mi)
- Elevation: 280 m (920 ft)
- Highest elevation: 291 m (955 ft)
- Lowest elevation: 240 m (790 ft)
- Population (2023): 69
  - Density: 22/km^{2} (57/sq mi)
- Time zone: UTC+01:00 (CET)
  - Summer (DST): UTC+02:00 (CEST)
- INSEE/Postal code: 54057 /54470
- ^{1} French Land Register data, which excludes lakes, ponds, glaciers > 1 km^{2} (0.386 sq mi or 247 acres) and river estuaries.

Beaumont (French pronunciation: [bomɔ̃]) is a commune in the Meurthe-et-Moselle department in northeastern France.

== Population ==
Historical population
Year	Pop.	±% p.a.
1968	37	—
1975	28	−3.90%
1982	59	+11.24%
1990	80	+3.88%
1999	63	−2.62%
2007	71	+1.51%
2012	66	−1.45%
2017	72	+1.76%
2023	69	−0.71%
Source: INSEE

== See also ==
- Communes of the Meurthe-et-Moselle department
- Parc naturel régional de Lorraine
