= Grosrouvres =

- Commune
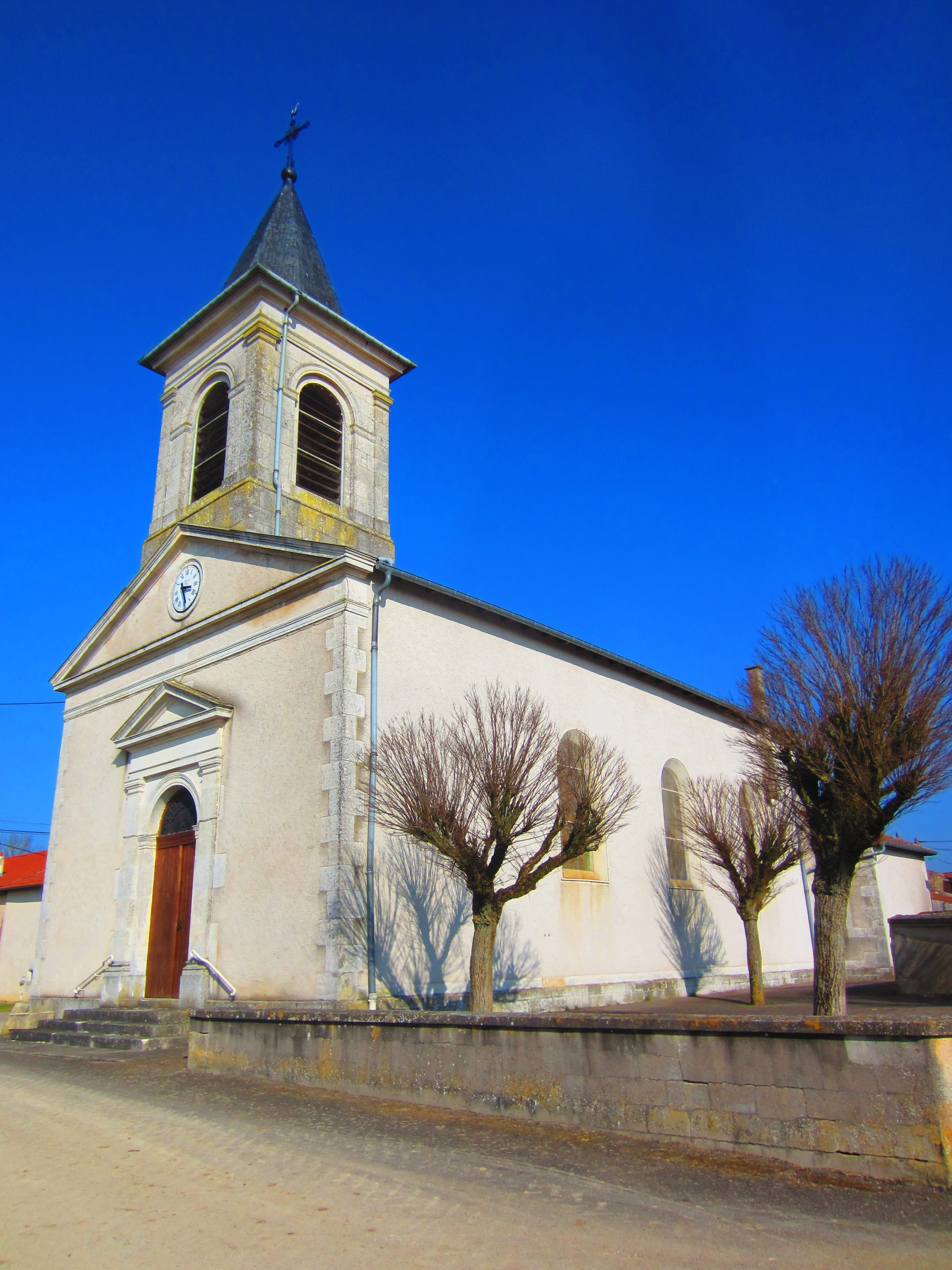
- The church in Grosrouvres

- Coat of arms
- Location of Grosrouvres
- Location within France Location within Grand Est
- Coordinates: 48°49′51″N 5°50′27″E
- Country: France
- Region: Grand Est
- Department: Meurthe-et-Moselle
- Arrondissement: Toul
- Canton: Le Nord-Toulois
- Intercommunality: CC Terres Touloises

Government
  - Mayor (2020–2026): Jérôme Tailly
- Area^{1}: 4.61 km^{2} (1.78 sq mi)
- Elevation: 240 m (790 ft)
- Highest elevation: 260 m (850 ft)
- Lowest elevation: 230 m (750 ft)
- Population (2023): 53
  - Density: 11/km^{2} (30/sq mi)
- Time zone: UTC+01:00 (CET)
  - Summer (DST): UTC+02:00 (CEST)
- INSEE/Postal code: 54240 /54470
- ^{1} French Land Register data, which excludes lakes, ponds, glaciers > 1 km^{2} (0.386 sq mi or 247 acres) and river estuaries.

Grosrouvres (French pronunciation: [ɡʁoʁuvʁ]) is a commune in the Meurthe-et-Moselle department in north-eastern France.

== See also ==
- Communes of the Meurthe-et-Moselle department
- Parc naturel régional de Lorraine
