= Aingeray =

- Commune
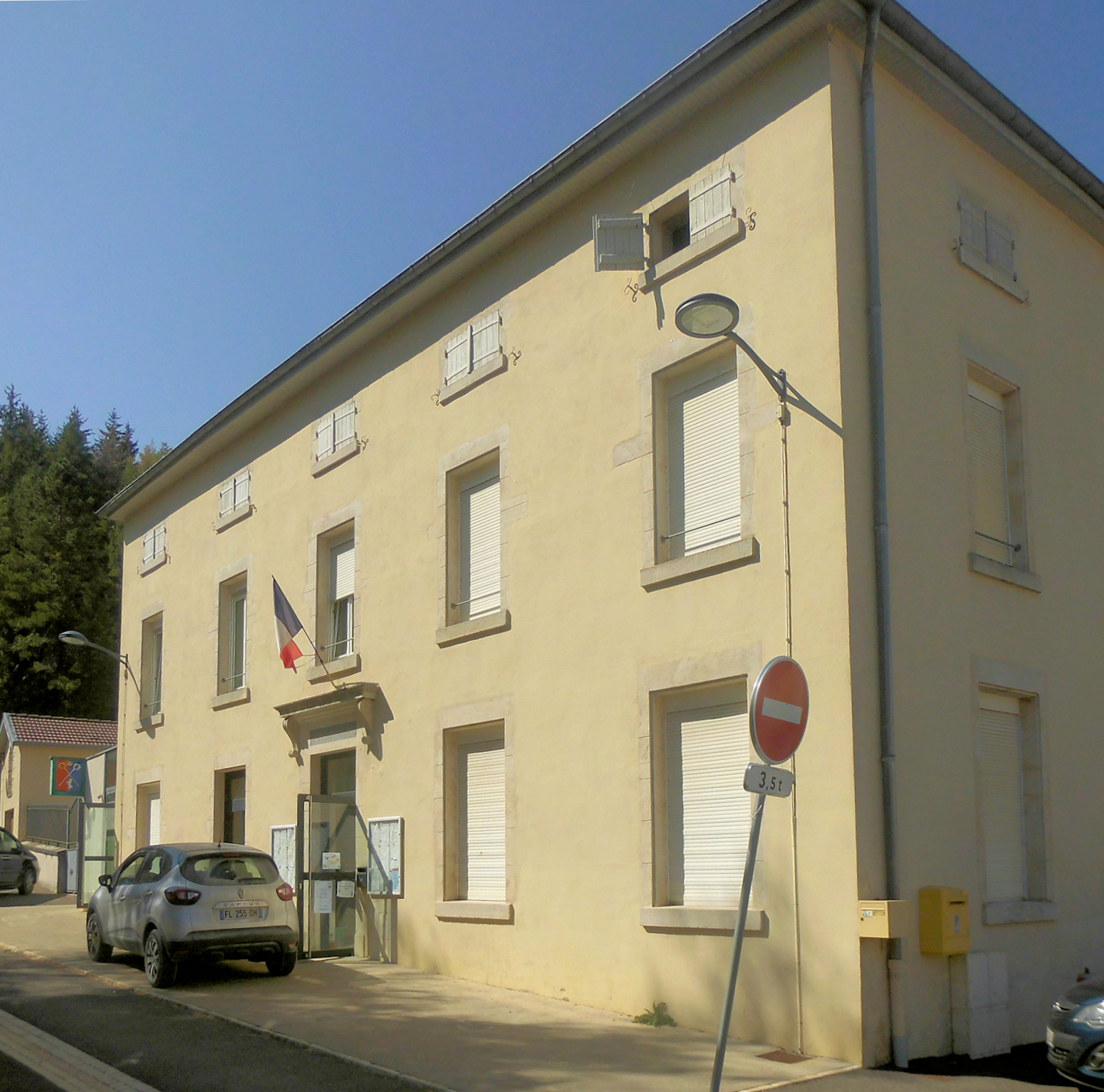
- Town hall

- Coat of arms
- Location of Aingeray
- Location within France Location within Grand Est
- Coordinates: 48°44′23″N 6°00′09″E
- Country: France
- Region: Grand Est
- Department: Meurthe-et-Moselle
- Arrondissement: Toul
- Canton: Le Nord-Toulois
- Intercommunality: Terres Touloises

Government
  - Mayor (2020–2026): André Fontaine
- Area^{1}: 12.79 km^{2} (4.94 sq mi)
- Elevation: 198 m (650 ft)
- Highest elevation: 289 m (948 ft)
- Lowest elevation: 192 m (630 ft)
- Population (2023): 532
  - Density: 41.6/km^{2} (108/sq mi)
- Time zone: UTC+01:00 (CET)
  - Summer (DST): UTC+02:00 (CEST)
- INSEE/Postal code: 54007 /54460
- ^{1} French Land Register data, which excludes lakes, ponds, glaciers > 1 km^{2} (0.386 sq mi or 247 acres) and river estuaries.

Aingeray (French pronunciation: [ɛ̃ʒʁɛ]) is a commune in the Meurthe-et-Moselle department in northeastern France.

== Population ==
Inhabitants are called Aingerois in French.

Historical population
Year	Pop.	±% p.a.
1968	397	—
1975	398	+0.04%
1982	417	+0.67%
1990	585	+4.32%
1999	638	+0.97%
2007	587	−1.04%
2012	545	−1.47%
2017	543	−0.07%
2023	532	−0.34%
Source: INSEE

== See also ==
- Communes of the Meurthe-et-Moselle department
