= Rogéville =

- Commune
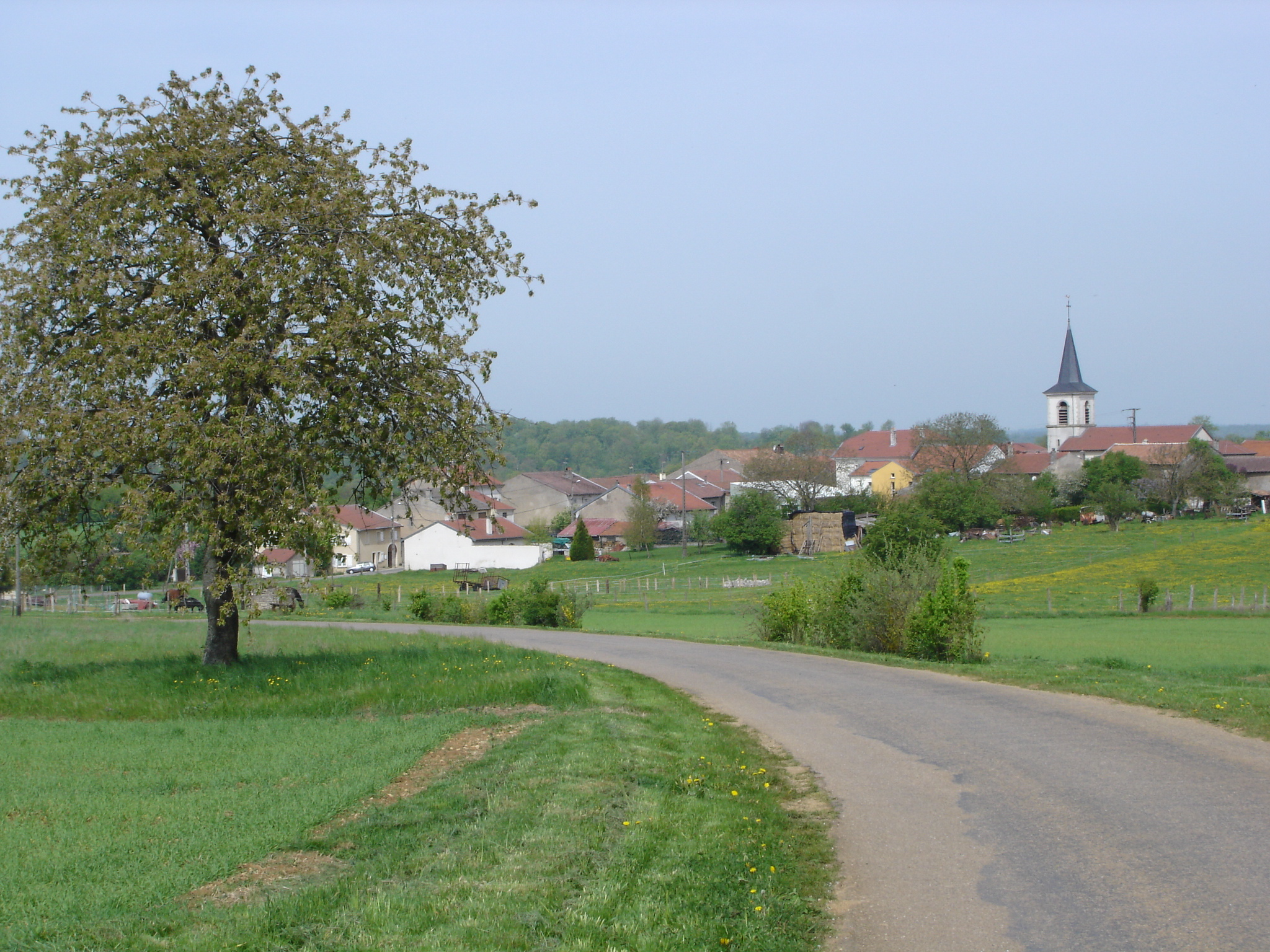
- A general view of Rogéville

- Coat of arms
- Location of Rogéville
- Location within France Location within Grand Est
- Coordinates: 48°49′14″N 5°58′53″E
- Country: France
- Region: Grand Est
- Department: Meurthe-et-Moselle
- Arrondissement: Nancy
- Canton: Le Nord-Toulois
- Intercommunality: CC Bassin de Pont-à-Mousson

Government
  - Mayor (2020–2026): Didier Pierrot
- Area^{1}: 6.94 km^{2} (2.68 sq mi)
- Elevation: 300 m (980 ft)
- Highest elevation: 316 m (1,037 ft)
- Lowest elevation: 208 m (682 ft)
- Population (2023): 157
  - Density: 22.6/km^{2} (58.6/sq mi)
- Time zone: UTC+01:00 (CET)
  - Summer (DST): UTC+02:00 (CEST)
- INSEE/Postal code: 54460 /54380
- ^{1} French Land Register data, which excludes lakes, ponds, glaciers > 1 km^{2} (0.386 sq mi or 247 acres) and river estuaries.

Rogéville is a commune in the Meurthe-et-Moselle department in north-eastern France.

== See also ==
- Communes of the Meurthe-et-Moselle department
- Parc naturel régional de Lorraine
