= Manoncourt-en-Woëvre =

- Commune
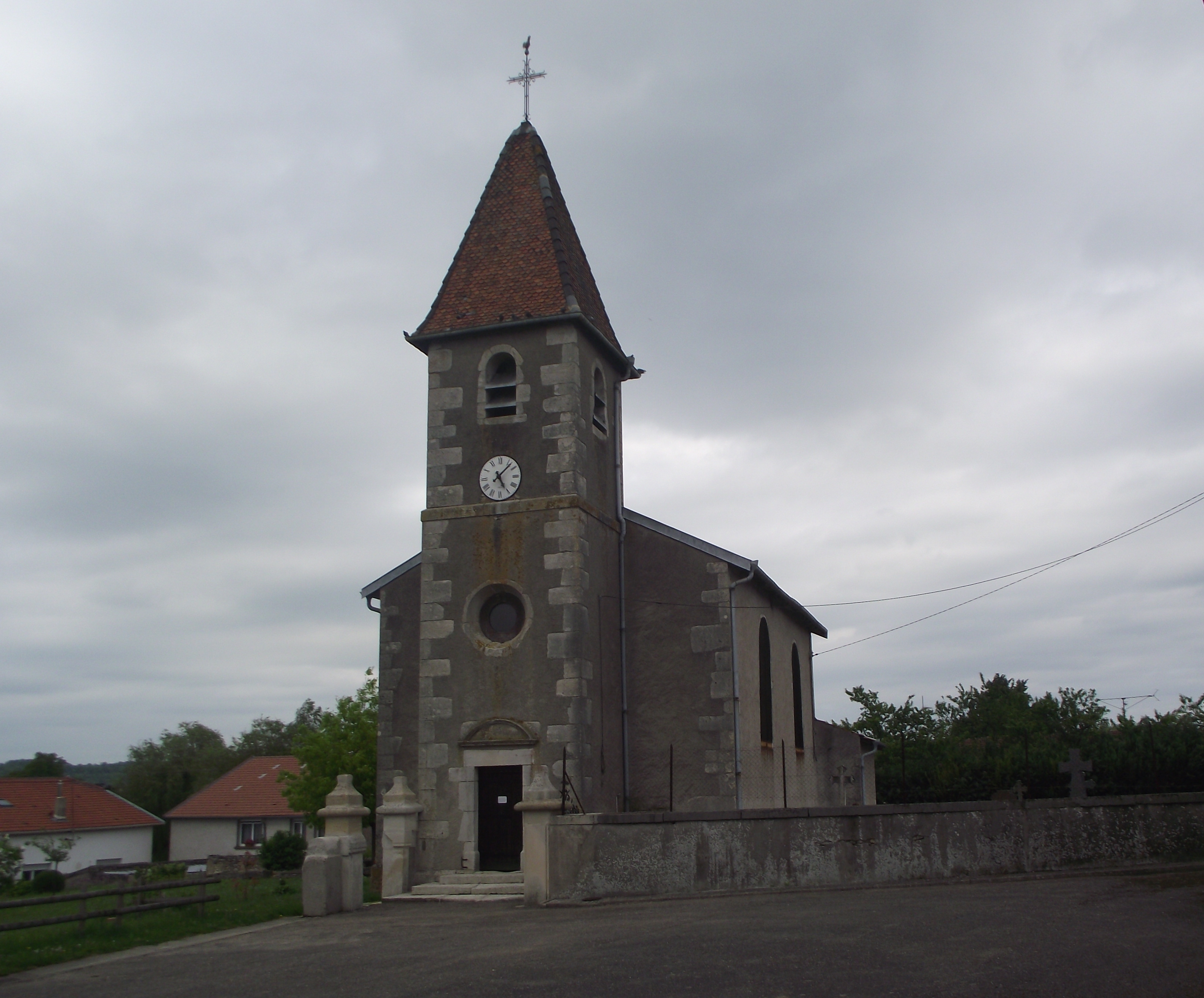
- The church in Manoncourt-en-Woëvre

- Coat of arms
- Location of Manoncourt-en-Woëvre
- Location within France Location within Grand Est
- Coordinates: 48°47′02″N 5°55′34″E
- Country: France
- Region: Grand Est
- Department: Meurthe-et-Moselle
- Arrondissement: Toul
- Canton: Le Nord-Toulois
- Intercommunality: Terres Touloises

Government
  - Mayor (2020–2026): Chantal Pierson
- Area^{1}: 10.56 km^{2} (4.08 sq mi)
- Elevation: 223 m (732 ft)
- Highest elevation: 311 m (1,020 ft)
- Lowest elevation: 212 m (696 ft)
- Population (2023): 256
  - Density: 24.2/km^{2} (62.8/sq mi)
- Time zone: UTC+01:00 (CET)
  - Summer (DST): UTC+02:00 (CEST)
- INSEE/Postal code: 54346 /54385
- ^{1} French Land Register data, which excludes lakes, ponds, glaciers > 1 km^{2} (0.386 sq mi or 247 acres) and river estuaries.

Manoncourt-en-Woëvre (French pronunciation: [manɔ̃kuʁ ɑ̃ wavʁ]) is a commune in the Meurthe-et-Moselle department in north-eastern France.

== See also ==
- Communes of the Meurthe-et-Moselle department
- Parc naturel régional de Lorraine
