= Bernécourt =

- Commune
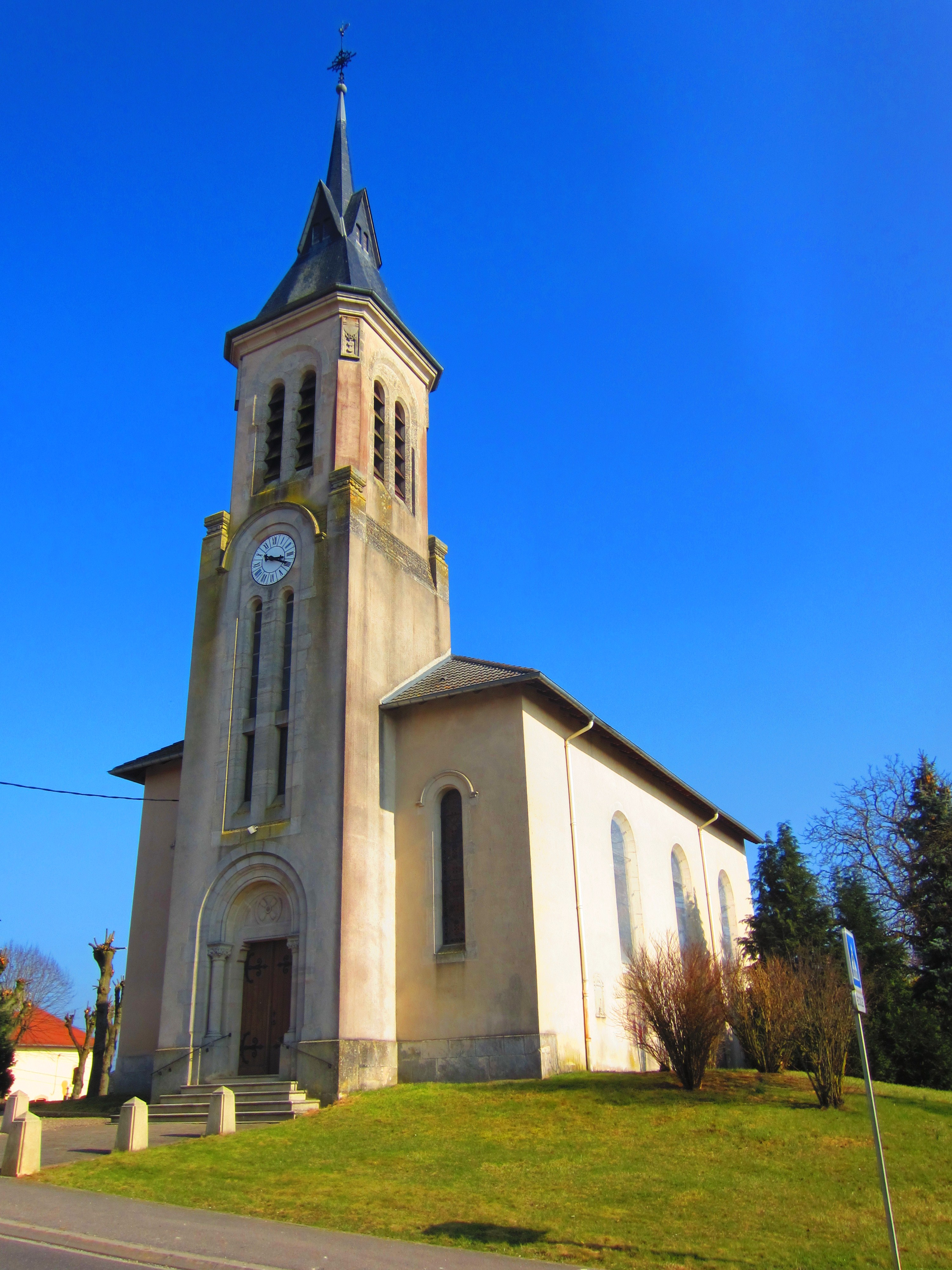
- The Church of Saint George

- Coat of arms
- Location of Bernécourt
- Location within France Location within Grand Est
- Coordinates: 48°50′38″N 5°50′39″E
- Country: France
- Region: Grand Est
- Department: Meurthe-et-Moselle
- Arrondissement: Toul
- Canton: Le Nord-Toulois
- Intercommunality: Mad et Moselle

Government
  - Mayor (2020–2026): Claude Marie Leroy
- Area^{1}: 9.38 km^{2} (3.62 sq mi)
- Elevation: 249 m (817 ft)
- Highest elevation: 295 m (968 ft)
- Lowest elevation: 240 m (790 ft)
- Population (2023): 178
  - Density: 19.0/km^{2} (49.1/sq mi)
- Time zone: UTC+01:00 (CET)
  - Summer (DST): UTC+02:00 (CEST)
- INSEE/Postal code: 54063 /54470
- ^{1} French Land Register data, which excludes lakes, ponds, glaciers > 1 km^{2} (0.386 sq mi or 247 acres) and river estuaries.

Bernécourt is a commune in the Meurthe-et-Moselle department in northeastern France.

== Population ==
Historical population
| Year | Pop. | ±% p.a. |
|---|---|---|
| 1968 | 190 | — |
| 1975 | 155 | −2.87% |
| 1982 | 177 | +1.91% |
| 1990 | 187 | +0.69% |
| 1999 | 181 | −0.36% |
| 2007 | 171 | −0.71% |
| 2012 | 180 | +1.03% |
| 2017 | 179 | −0.11% |
| 2023 | 178 | −0.09% |
Source: INSEE

== See also ==
- Communes of the Meurthe-et-Moselle department
- Parc naturel régional de Lorraine
