= Ansauville =

- Commune
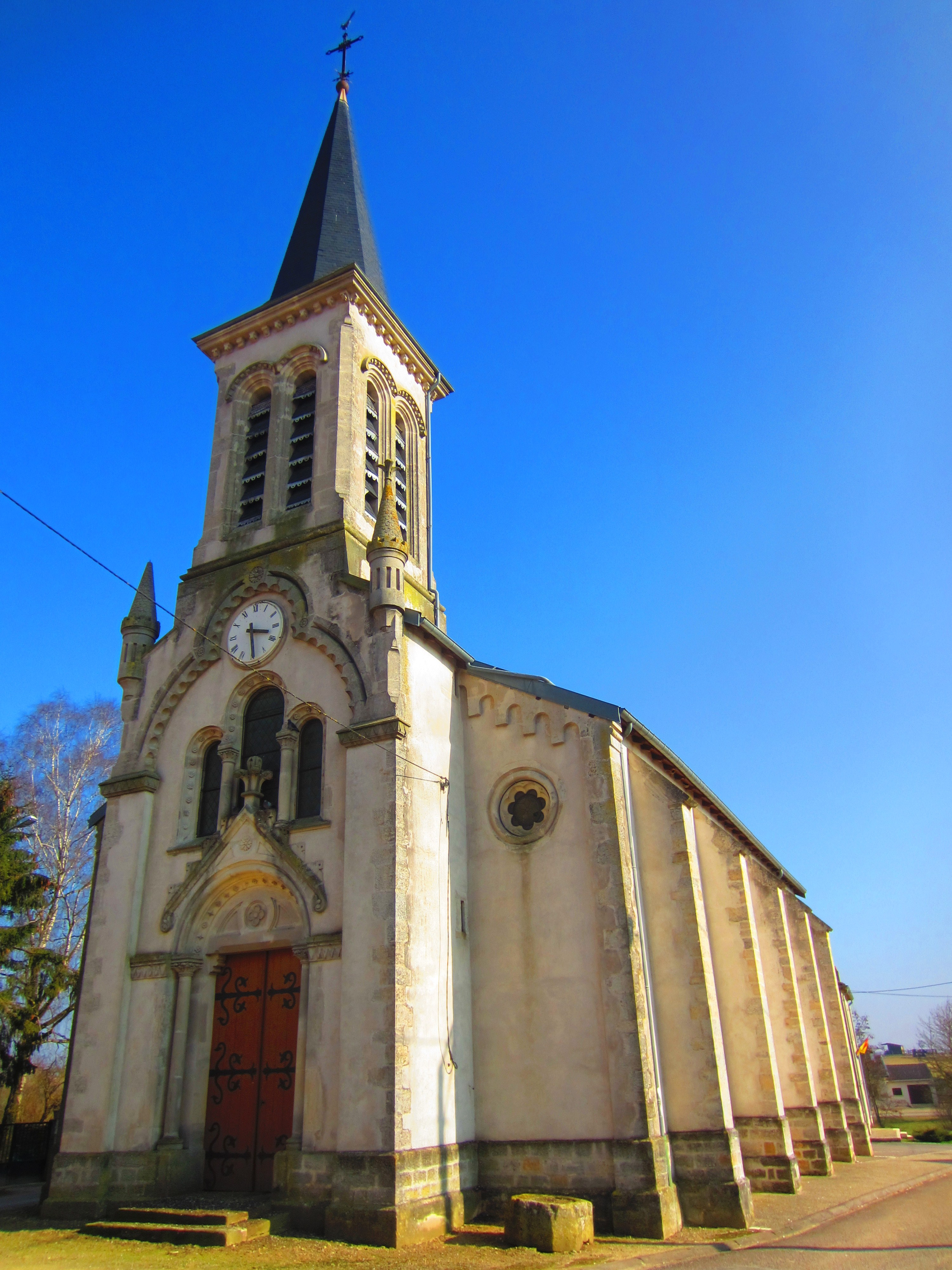
- The church in Ansauville

- Coat of arms
- Location of Ansauville
- Location within France Location within Grand Est
- Coordinates: 48°49′23″N 5°49′41″E
- Country: France
- Region: Grand Est
- Department: Meurthe-et-Moselle
- Arrondissement: Toul
- Canton: Le Nord-Toulois

Government
  - Mayor (2020–2026): Thierry Collet
- Area^{1}: 6.97 km^{2} (2.69 sq mi)
- Elevation: 232 m (761 ft)
- Highest elevation: 250 m (820 ft)
- Lowest elevation: 232 m (761 ft)
- Population (2023): 76
  - Density: 11/km^{2} (28/sq mi)
- Time zone: UTC+01:00 (CET)
  - Summer (DST): UTC+02:00 (CEST)
- INSEE/Postal code: 54019 /54470
- ^{1} French Land Register data, which excludes lakes, ponds, glaciers > 1 km^{2} (0.386 sq mi or 247 acres) and river estuaries.

Ansauville (French pronunciation: [ɑ̃sovil]) is a commune in the Meurthe-et-Moselle department in northeastern France.

== Population ==
Historical population
Year	Pop.	±% p.a.
1968	78	—
1975	74	−0.75%
1982	74	+0.00%
1990	77	+0.50%
1999	79	+0.29%
2007	84	+0.77%
2012	84	+0.00%
2017	82	−0.48%
2023	76	−1.26%
Source: INSEE

== See also ==
- Communes of the Meurthe-et-Moselle department
- Parc naturel régional de Lorraine
