= Liverdun =

- Commune
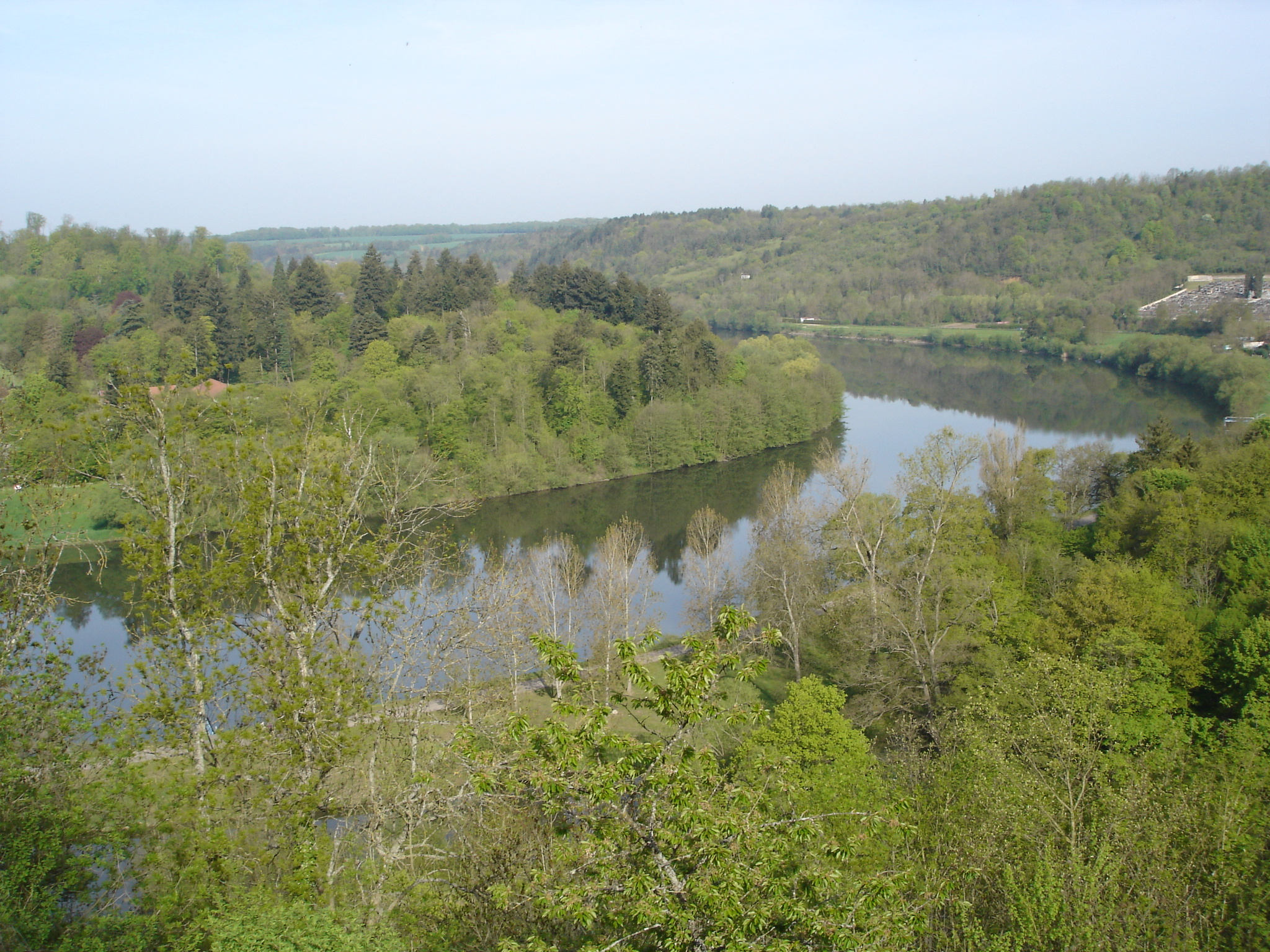
- The Moselle river in Liverdun

- Coat of arms
- Location of Liverdun
- Location within France Location within Grand Est
- Coordinates: 48°44′59″N 6°03′44″E
- Country: France
- Region: Grand Est
- Department: Meurthe-et-Moselle
- Arrondissement: Nancy
- Canton: Le Nord-Toulois
- Intercommunality: Bassin de Pompey

Government
  - Mayor (2020–2026): Sébastien Dosé
- Area^{1}: 25.25 km^{2} (9.75 sq mi)
- Elevation: 204 m (669 ft)
- Highest elevation: 325 m (1,066 ft)
- Lowest elevation: 203 m (666 ft)
- Population (2023): 5,580
  - Density: 221/km^{2} (572/sq mi)
- Time zone: UTC+01:00 (CET)
  - Summer (DST): UTC+02:00 (CEST)
- INSEE/Postal code: 54318 /54460
- ^{1} French Land Register data, which excludes lakes, ponds, glaciers > 1 km^{2} (0.386 sq mi or 247 acres) and river estuaries.

Liverdun (French pronunciation: [livɛʁdœ̃]) is a commune in the Meurthe-et-Moselle department in north-eastern France.

== Population ==
Historical population
Year	Pop.	±% p.a.
1968	3,876	—
1975	5,035	+3.81%
1982	6,110	+2.80%
1990	6,435	+0.65%
1999	6,390	−0.08%
2007	5,864	−1.07%
2012	5,910	+0.16%
2017	6,087	+0.59%
2023	5,580	−1.44%
Source: INSEE

== See also ==
- Communes of the Meurthe-et-Moselle department
