= Noviant-aux-Prés =

- Commune
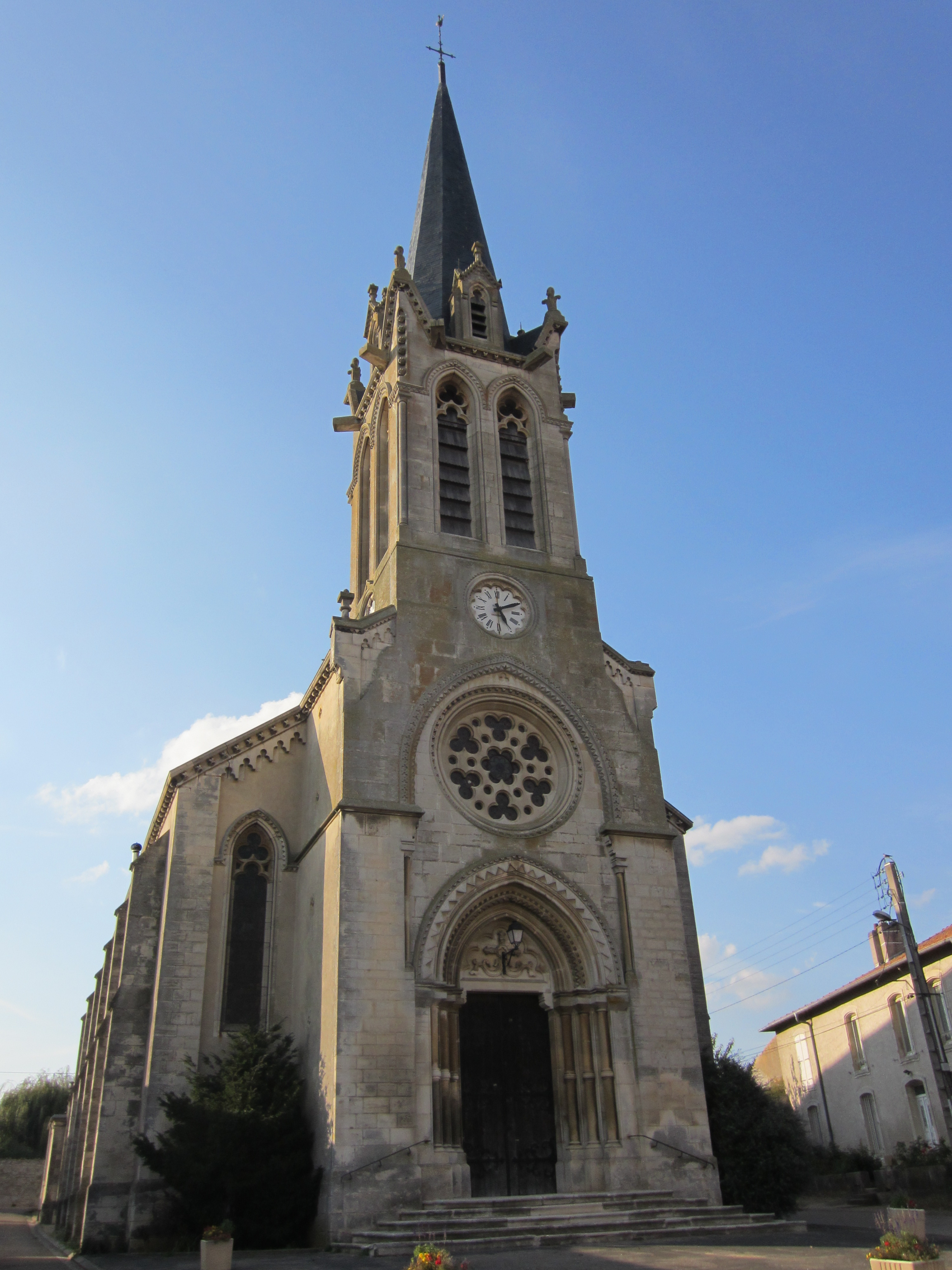
- The church in Noviant-aux-Prés

- Coat of arms
- Location of Noviant-aux-Prés
- Location within France Location within Grand Est
- Coordinates: 48°50′28″N 5°52′58″E
- Country: France
- Region: Grand Est
- Department: Meurthe-et-Moselle
- Arrondissement: Toul
- Canton: Le Nord-Toulois
- Intercommunality: CC Terres Touloises

Government
  - Mayor (2020–2026): François Mansion
- Area^{1}: 11.19 km^{2} (4.32 sq mi)
- Elevation: 250 m (820 ft)
- Highest elevation: 314 m (1,030 ft)
- Lowest elevation: 220 m (720 ft)
- Population (2023): 216
  - Density: 19.3/km^{2} (50.0/sq mi)
- Time zone: UTC+01:00 (CET)
  - Summer (DST): UTC+02:00 (CEST)
- INSEE/Postal code: 54404 /54385
- ^{1} French Land Register data, which excludes lakes, ponds, glaciers > 1 km^{2} (0.386 sq mi or 247 acres) and river estuaries.

Noviant-aux-Prés (French pronunciation: [nɔvjɑ̃ o pʁe]) is a commune in the Meurthe-et-Moselle department in north-eastern France.

== See also ==
- Communes of the Meurthe-et-Moselle department
- Parc naturel régional de Lorraine
