= Lagney =

- Commune
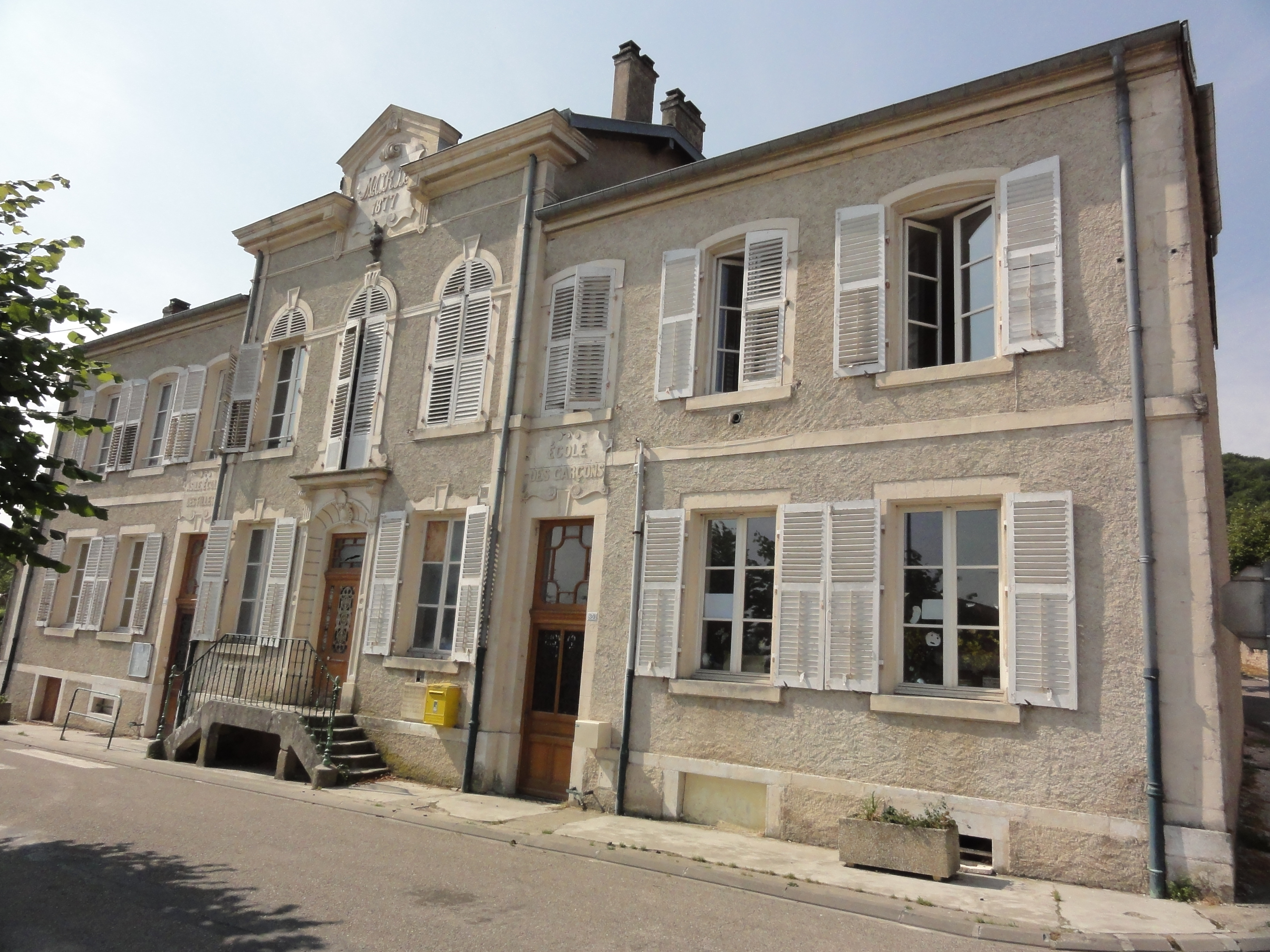
- The town hall and school in Lagney

- Coat of arms
- Location of Lagney
- Location within France Location within Grand Est
- Coordinates: 48°44′01″N 5°50′25″E
- Country: France
- Region: Grand Est
- Department: Meurthe-et-Moselle
- Arrondissement: Toul
- Canton: Le Nord-Toulois
- Intercommunality: Terres Touloises

Government
  - Mayor (2020–2026): Bernard Chenot
- Area^{1}: 14.34 km^{2} (5.54 sq mi)
- Elevation: 254 m (833 ft)
- Highest elevation: 300 m (980 ft)
- Lowest elevation: 224 m (735 ft)
- Population (2023): 500
  - Density: 35/km^{2} (90/sq mi)
- Time zone: UTC+01:00 (CET)
  - Summer (DST): UTC+02:00 (CEST)
- INSEE/Postal code: 54288 /54200
- ^{1} French Land Register data, which excludes lakes, ponds, glaciers > 1 km^{2} (0.386 sq mi or 247 acres) and river estuaries.

Lagney (French pronunciation: [laɲɛ]) is a commune in the Meurthe-et-Moselle department in north-eastern France.

== See also ==
- Communes of the Meurthe-et-Moselle department
- Parc naturel régional de Lorraine
