= Gézoncourt =

- Commune
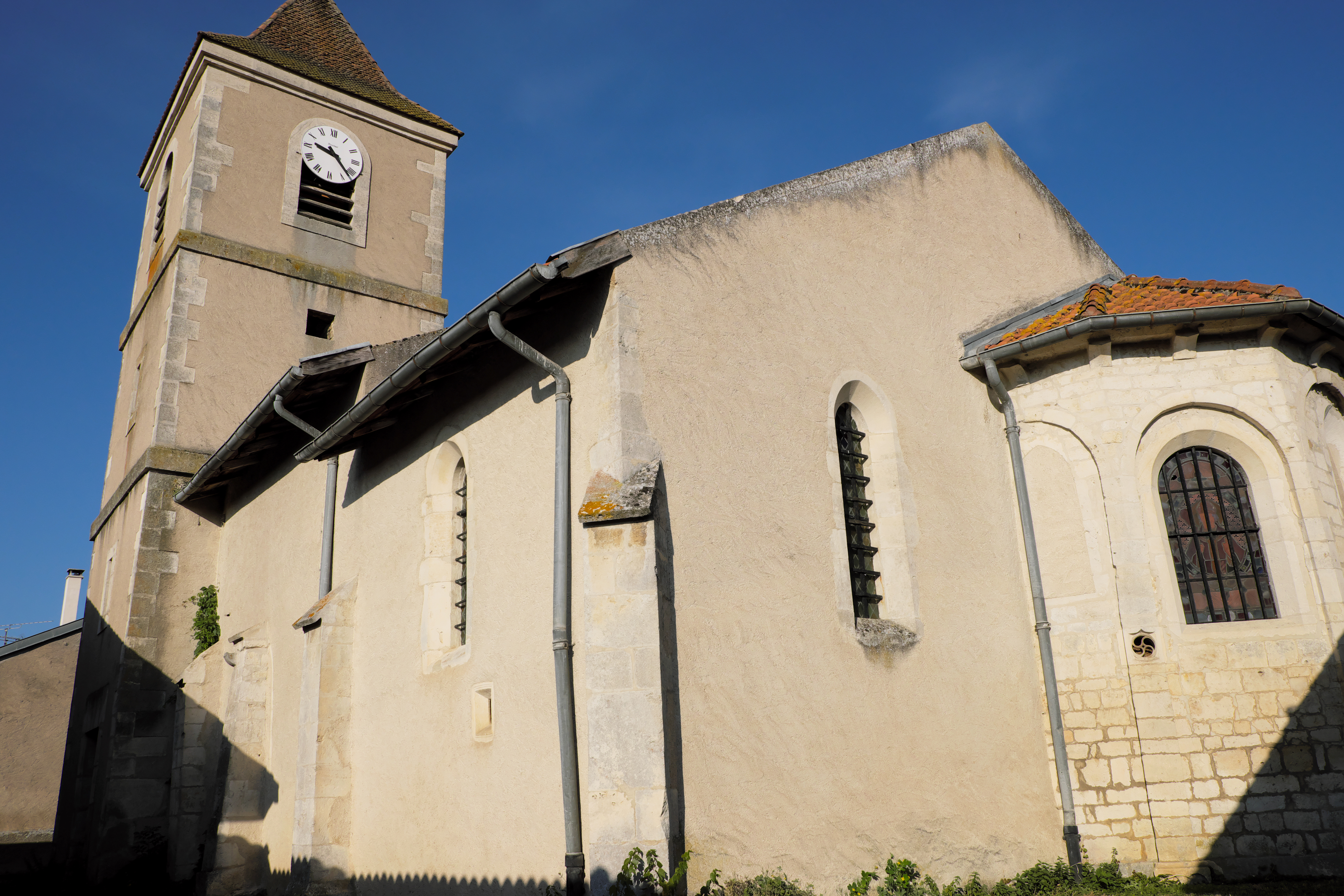
- The church in Gézoncourt

- Coat of arms
- Location of Gézoncourt
- Location within France Location within Grand Est
- Coordinates: 48°50′18″N 5°59′45″E
- Country: France
- Region: Grand Est
- Department: Meurthe-et-Moselle
- Arrondissement: Nancy
- Canton: Le Nord-Toulois
- Intercommunality: CC Bassin de Pont-à-Mousson

Government
  - Mayor (2020–2026): Bernard Burté
- Area^{1}: 5.34 km^{2} (2.06 sq mi)
- Elevation: 230 m (750 ft)
- Highest elevation: 305 m (1,001 ft)
- Lowest elevation: 205 m (673 ft)
- Population (2023): 185
  - Density: 34.6/km^{2} (89.7/sq mi)
- Time zone: UTC+01:00 (CET)
  - Summer (DST): UTC+02:00 (CEST)
- INSEE/Postal code: 54225 /54380
- ^{1} French Land Register data, which excludes lakes, ponds, glaciers > 1 km^{2} (0.386 sq mi or 247 acres) and river estuaries.

Gézoncourt (French pronunciation: [ʒezɔ̃kuʁ]) is a commune in the Meurthe-et-Moselle department of northeastern France. It has a population of 178 (2018) and is between the towns of Metz and Nancy. Its current mayor is Bernard Burté, re-elected in 2020.

== See also ==
- Communes of the Meurthe-et-Moselle department
- Parc naturel régional de Lorraine
