= Royaumeix =

- Commune
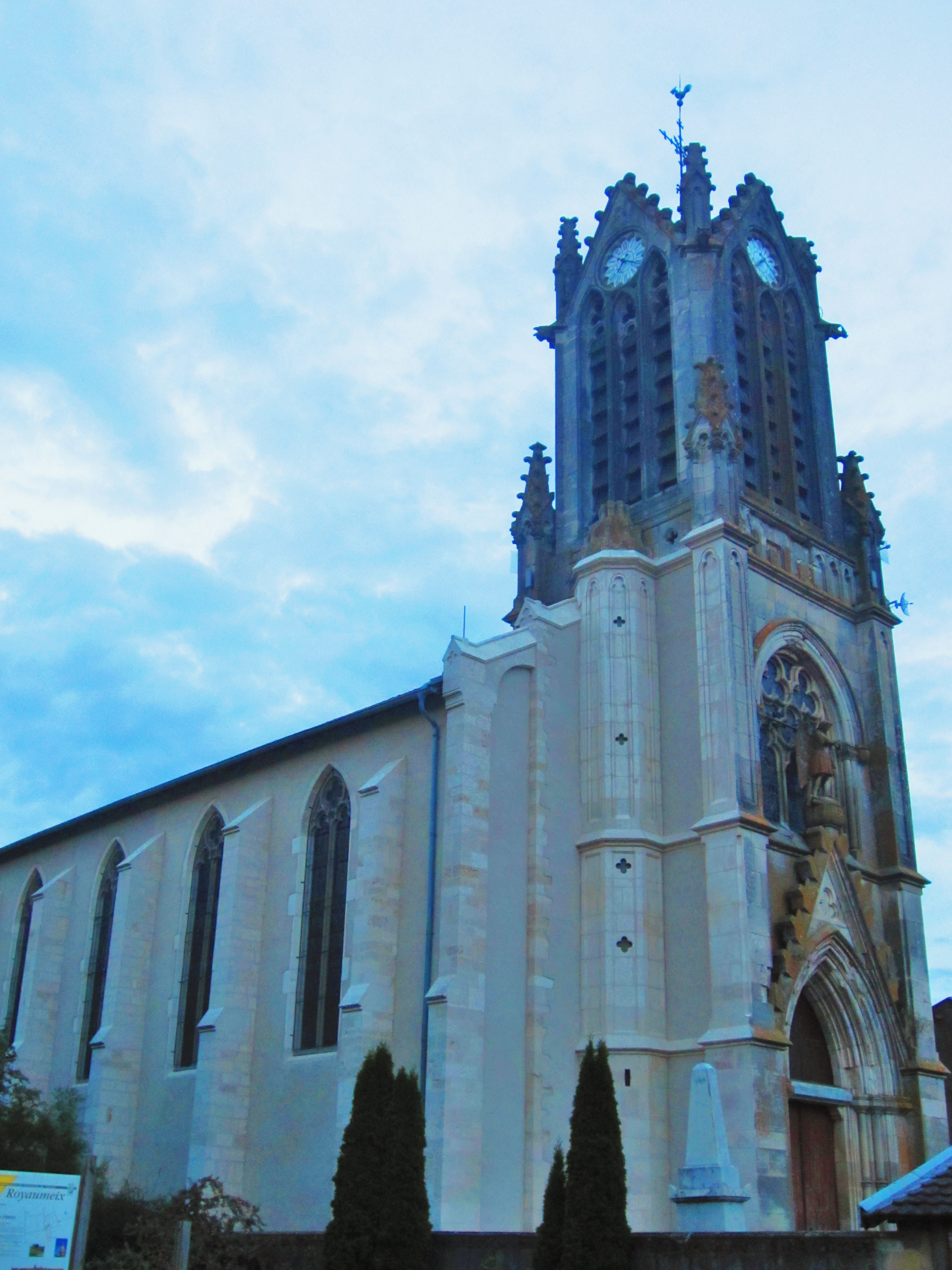
- The church in Royaumeix

- Coat of arms
- Location of Royaumeix
- Location within France Location within Grand Est
- Coordinates: 48°46′44″N 5°52′16″E
- Country: France
- Region: Grand Est
- Department: Meurthe-et-Moselle
- Arrondissement: Toul
- Canton: Le Nord-Toulois
- Intercommunality: Terres Touloises

Government
  - Mayor (2020–2026): Tony Chenot
- Area^{1}: 21.57 km^{2} (8.33 sq mi)
- Elevation: 247 m (810 ft)
- Highest elevation: 257 m (843 ft)
- Lowest elevation: 224 m (735 ft)
- Population (2023): 385
  - Density: 17.8/km^{2} (46.2/sq mi)
- Time zone: UTC+01:00 (CET)
  - Summer (DST): UTC+02:00 (CEST)
- INSEE/Postal code: 54466 /54200
- ^{1} French Land Register data, which excludes lakes, ponds, glaciers > 1 km^{2} (0.386 sq mi or 247 acres) and river estuaries.

Royaumeix (French pronunciation: [ʁwajomɛ]) is a commune in the Meurthe-et-Moselle department in north-eastern France.

== See also ==
- Communes of the Meurthe-et-Moselle department
- Parc naturel régional de Lorraine
