= Mandres-aux-Quatre-Tours =

- Commune
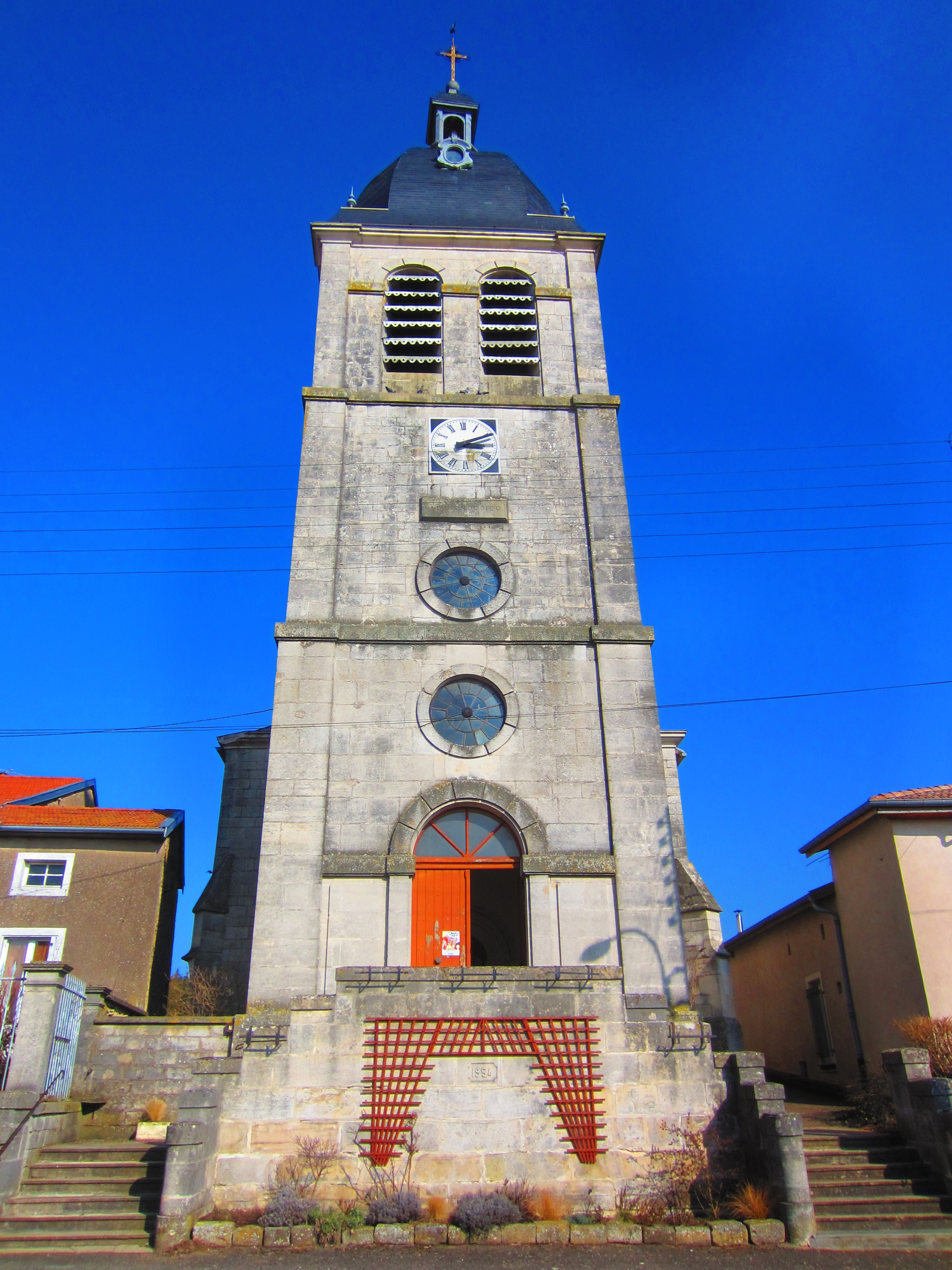
- The church in Mandres-aux-Quatre-Tours

- Coat of arms
- Location of Mandres-aux-Quatre-Tours
- Location within France Location within Grand Est
- Coordinates: 48°50′27″N 5°48′00″E
- Country: France
- Region: Grand Est
- Department: Meurthe-et-Moselle
- Arrondissement: Toul
- Canton: Le Nord-Toulois
- Intercommunality: Mad et Moselle

Government
  - Mayor (2020–2026): Denis Fourriere
- Area^{1}: 10.24 km^{2} (3.95 sq mi)
- Highest elevation: 288 m (945 ft)
- Lowest elevation: 236 m (774 ft)
- Population (2023): 207
  - Density: 20.2/km^{2} (52.4/sq mi)
- Time zone: UTC+01:00 (CET)
  - Summer (DST): UTC+02:00 (CEST)
- INSEE/Postal code: 54343 /54470
- ^{1} French Land Register data, which excludes lakes, ponds, glaciers > 1 km^{2} (0.386 sq mi or 247 acres) and river estuaries.

Mandres-aux-Quatre-Tours (French pronunciation: [mɑ̃dʁ o katʁ tuʁ]) is a commune in the Meurthe-et-Moselle department in north-eastern France.

== See also ==
- Communes of the Meurthe-et-Moselle department
- Parc naturel régional de Lorraine
