= Trondes =

- Commune
- Coat of arms
- Location of Trondes
- Location within France Location within Grand Est
- Coordinates: 48°43′00″N 5°46′24″E
- Country: France
- Region: Grand Est
- Department: Meurthe-et-Moselle
- Arrondissement: Toul
- Canton: Le Nord-Toulois
- Intercommunality: Terres Touloises

Government
  - Mayor (2021–2026): Daniel Felten
- Area^{1}: 12.64 km^{2} (4.88 sq mi)
- Elevation: 250 m (820 ft)
- Highest elevation: 368 m (1,207 ft)
- Lowest elevation: 237 m (778 ft)
- Population (2023): 522
  - Density: 41.3/km^{2} (107/sq mi)
- Time zone: UTC+01:00 (CET)
  - Summer (DST): UTC+02:00 (CEST)
- INSEE/Postal code: 54534 /54570
- ^{1} French Land Register data, which excludes lakes, ponds, glaciers > 1 km^{2} (0.386 sq mi or 247 acres) and river estuaries.

Trondes (French pronunciation: [tʁɔ̃d]) is a commune in the Meurthe-et-Moselle department in north-eastern France.

== See also ==
- Communes of the Meurthe-et-Moselle department
- Parc naturel régional de Lorraine
