= Villey-Saint-Étienne =

- Commune
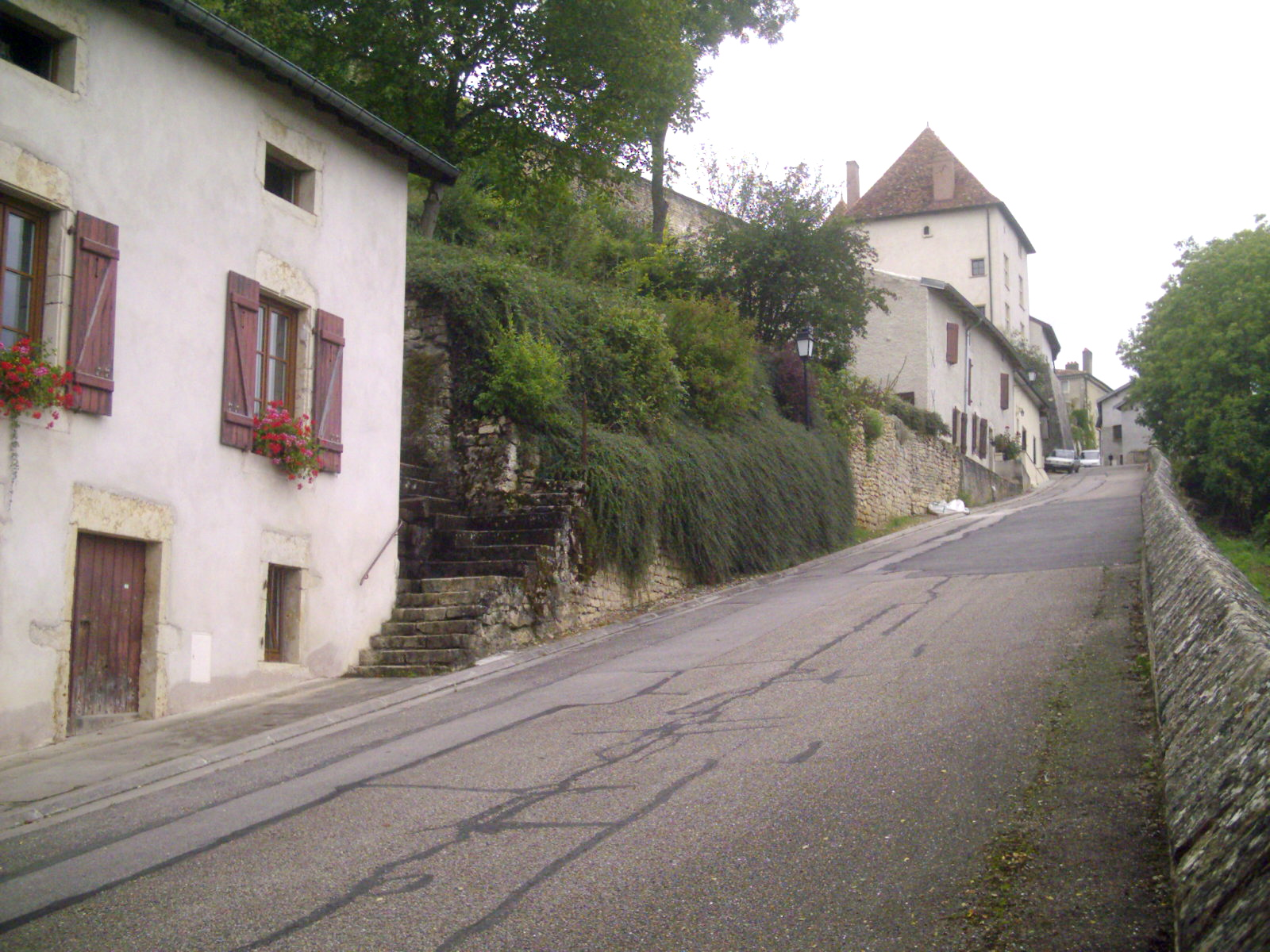
- The fortified house

- Coat of arms
- Location of Villey-Saint-Étienne
- Location within France Location within Grand Est
- Coordinates: 48°43′54″N 5°58′43″E
- Country: France
- Region: Grand Est
- Department: Meurthe-et-Moselle
- Arrondissement: Toul
- Canton: Le Nord-Toulois
- Intercommunality: CC Terres Touloises

Government
  - Mayor (2020–2026): Jean-Pierre Couteau
- Area^{1}: 17.29 km^{2} (6.68 sq mi)
- Elevation: 230 m (750 ft)
- Highest elevation: 253 m (830 ft)
- Lowest elevation: 192 m (630 ft)
- Population (2023): 1,024
  - Density: 59.22/km^{2} (153.4/sq mi)
- Time zone: UTC+01:00 (CET)
  - Summer (DST): UTC+02:00 (CEST)
- INSEE/Postal code: 54584 /54200
- ^{1} French Land Register data, which excludes lakes, ponds, glaciers > 1 km^{2} (0.386 sq mi or 247 acres) and river estuaries.

Villey-Saint-Étienne (French pronunciation: [vilɛ sɛ̃t‿etjɛn]) is a commune in the Meurthe-et-Moselle department in north-eastern France.

== See also ==
- Communes of the Meurthe-et-Moselle department
