= Sanzey =

- Commune
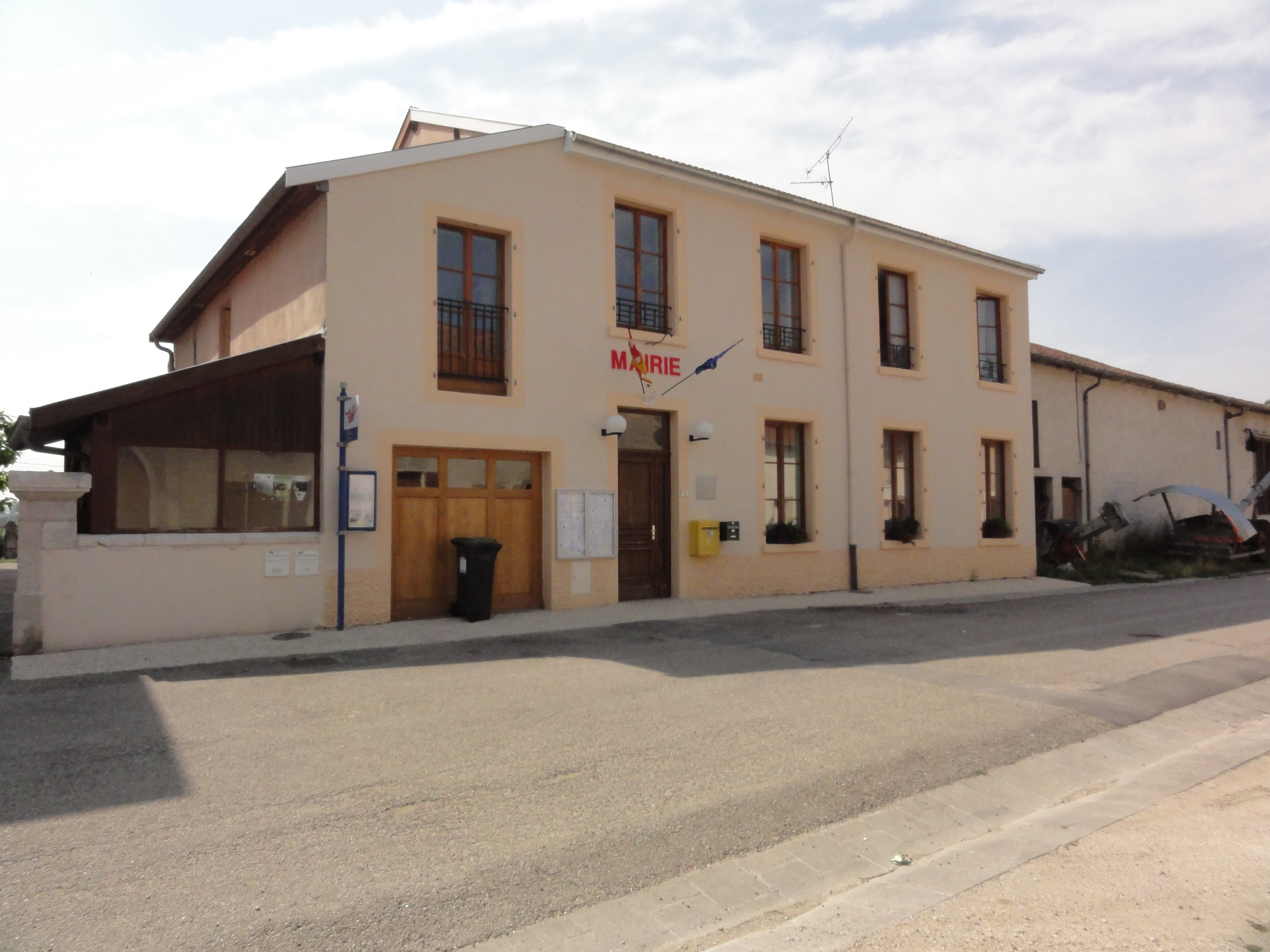
- The town hall in Sanzey

- Coat of arms
- Location of Sanzey
- Location within France Location within Grand Est
- Coordinates: 48°46′20″N 5°50′21″E
- Country: France
- Region: Grand Est
- Department: Meurthe-et-Moselle
- Arrondissement: Toul
- Canton: Le Nord-Toulois
- Intercommunality: Terres Touloises

Government
  - Mayor (2020–2026): Gérald Erzen
- Area^{1}: 3.58 km^{2} (1.38 sq mi)
- Elevation: 230 m (750 ft)
- Highest elevation: 239 m (784 ft)
- Lowest elevation: 223 m (732 ft)
- Population (2023): 137
  - Density: 38.3/km^{2} (99.1/sq mi)
- Time zone: UTC+01:00 (CET)
  - Summer (DST): UTC+02:00 (CEST)
- INSEE/Postal code: 54492 /54200
- ^{1} French Land Register data, which excludes lakes, ponds, glaciers > 1 km^{2} (0.386 sq mi or 247 acres) and river estuaries.

Sanzey (French pronunciation: [sɑ̃zɛ]) is a commune in the Meurthe-et-Moselle department in north-eastern France.

== Population ==
Historical population
| Year | Pop. | ±% p.a. |
|---|---|---|
| 1968 | 100 | — |
| 1975 | 95 | −0.73% |
| 1982 | 91 | −0.61% |
| 1990 | 119 | +3.41% |
| 1999 | 138 | +1.66% |
| 2007 | 138 | +0.00% |
| 2012 | 136 | −0.29% |
| 2017 | 144 | +1.15% |
| 2023 | 137 | −0.83% |
Source: INSEE

== See also ==
- Communes of the Meurthe-et-Moselle department
- Parc naturel régional de Lorraine
