= Jaillon =

- Commune
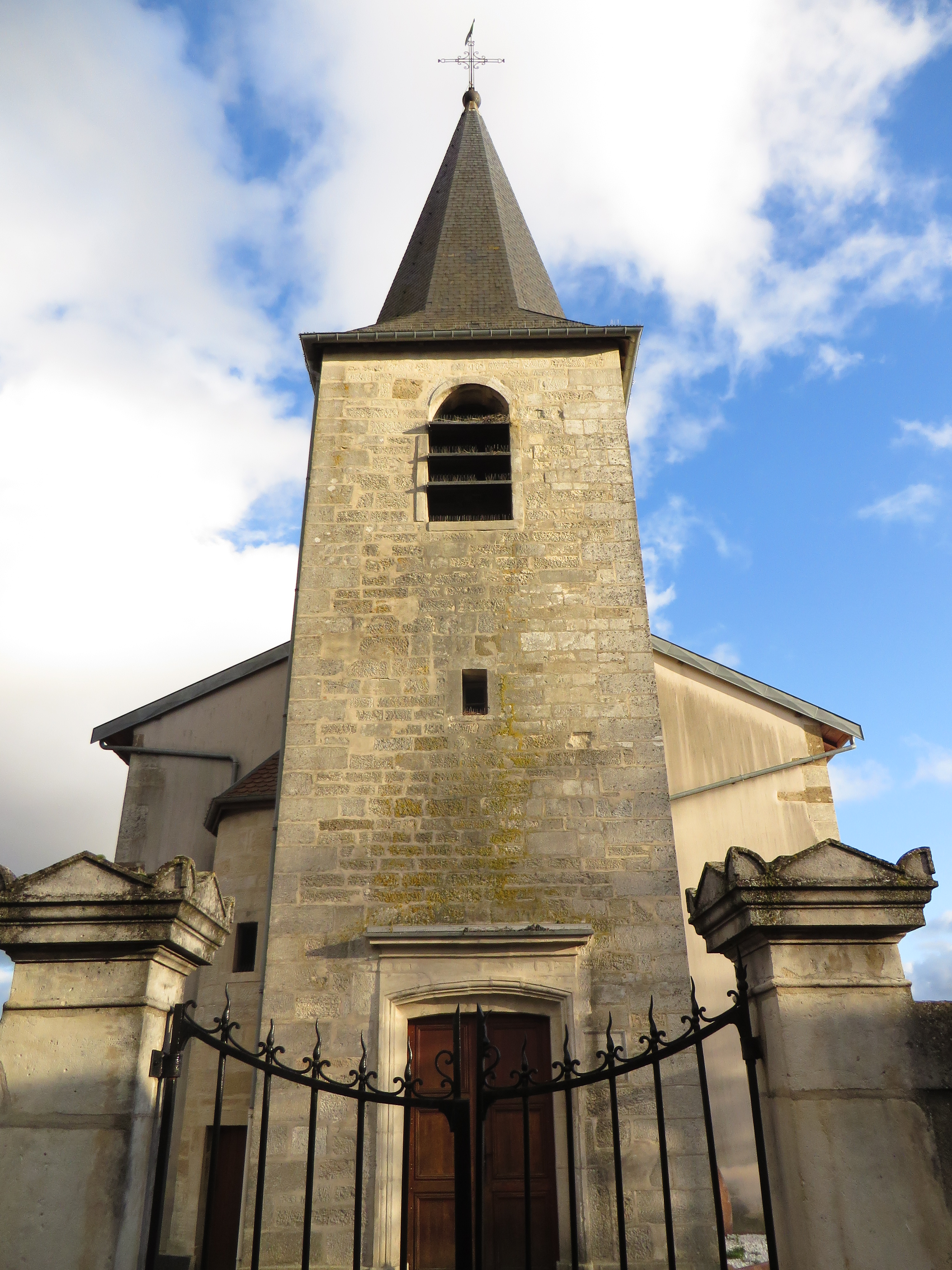
- The church in Jaillon

- Coat of arms
- Location of Jaillon
- Location within France Location within Grand Est
- Coordinates: 48°45′27″N 5°58′08″E
- Country: France
- Region: Grand Est
- Department: Meurthe-et-Moselle
- Arrondissement: Toul
- Canton: Le Nord-Toulois
- Intercommunality: Terres Touloises

Government
  - Mayor (2020–2026): Catherine Sauvage
- Area^{1}: 7.47 km^{2} (2.88 sq mi)
- Elevation: 246 m (807 ft)
- Highest elevation: 277 m (909 ft)
- Lowest elevation: 197 m (646 ft)
- Population (2023): 469
  - Density: 62.8/km^{2} (163/sq mi)
- Time zone: UTC+01:00 (CET)
  - Summer (DST): UTC+02:00 (CEST)
- INSEE/Postal code: 54272 /54200
- ^{1} French Land Register data, which excludes lakes, ponds, glaciers > 1 km^{2} (0.386 sq mi or 247 acres) and river estuaries.

Jaillon (French pronunciation: [ʒajɔ̃]) is a commune in the Meurthe-et-Moselle department in north-eastern France.

== Population ==
Historical population
Year	Pop.	±% p.a.
1968	180	—
1975	166	−1.15%
1982	179	+1.08%
1990	249	+4.21%
1999	302	+2.17%
2007	361	+2.26%
2012	440	+4.04%
2017	478	+1.67%
2023	469	−0.32%
Source: INSEE

== See also ==
- Communes of the Meurthe-et-Moselle department
