= Griscourt =

- Commune
- Coat of arms
- Location of Griscourt
- Location within France Location within Grand Est
- Coordinates: 48°50′03″N 6°00′51″E
- Country: France
- Region: Grand Est
- Department: Meurthe-et-Moselle
- Arrondissement: Nancy
- Canton: Le Nord-Toulois
- Intercommunality: CC Bassin de Pont-à-Mousson

Government
  - Mayor (2020–2026): Leslie Dudoit
- Area^{1}: 3.74 km^{2} (1.44 sq mi)
- Elevation: 215 m (705 ft)
- Highest elevation: 281 m (922 ft)
- Lowest elevation: 197 m (646 ft)
- Population (2023): 137
  - Density: 36.6/km^{2} (94.9/sq mi)
- Time zone: UTC+01:00 (CET)
  - Summer (DST): UTC+02:00 (CEST)
- INSEE/Postal code: 54239 /54380
- ^{1} French Land Register data, which excludes lakes, ponds, glaciers > 1 km^{2} (0.386 sq mi or 247 acres) and river estuaries.

Griscourt is a commune in the Meurthe-et-Moselle department in north-eastern France.

== See also ==
- Communes of the Meurthe-et-Moselle department
- Parc naturel régional de Lorraine
