= Villers-en-Haye =

- Commune
- Coat of arms
- Location of Villers-en-Haye
- Location within France Location within Grand Est
- Coordinates: 48°49′42″N 6°00′46″E
- Country: France
- Region: Grand Est
- Department: Meurthe-et-Moselle
- Arrondissement: Nancy
- Canton: Le Nord-Toulois
- Intercommunality: CC Bassin de Pont-à-Mousson

Government
  - Mayor (2020–2026): Marie Delacour
- Area^{1}: 7.29 km^{2} (2.81 sq mi)
- Elevation: 251 m (823 ft)
- Highest elevation: 316 m (1,037 ft)
- Lowest elevation: 201 m (659 ft)
- Population (2023): 157
  - Density: 21.5/km^{2} (55.8/sq mi)
- Time zone: UTC+01:00 (CET)
  - Summer (DST): UTC+02:00 (CEST)
- INSEE/Postal code: 54573 /54380
- ^{1} French Land Register data, which excludes lakes, ponds, glaciers > 1 km^{2} (0.386 sq mi or 247 acres) and river estuaries.

Villers-en-Haye (French pronunciation: [vilɛʁ ɑ̃ ɛ]) is a commune in the Meurthe-et-Moselle department in north-eastern France.

== Population ==
Historical population
Year	Pop.	±% p.a.
1968	174	—
1975	163	−0.93%
1982	161	−0.18%
1990	148	−1.05%
1999	181	+2.26%
2007	164	−1.23%
2012	188	+2.77%
2017	179	−0.98%
2023	157	−2.16%
Source: INSEE

== See also ==
- Communes of the Meurthe-et-Moselle department
- Parc naturel régional de Lorraine
