= Manonville =

- Commune
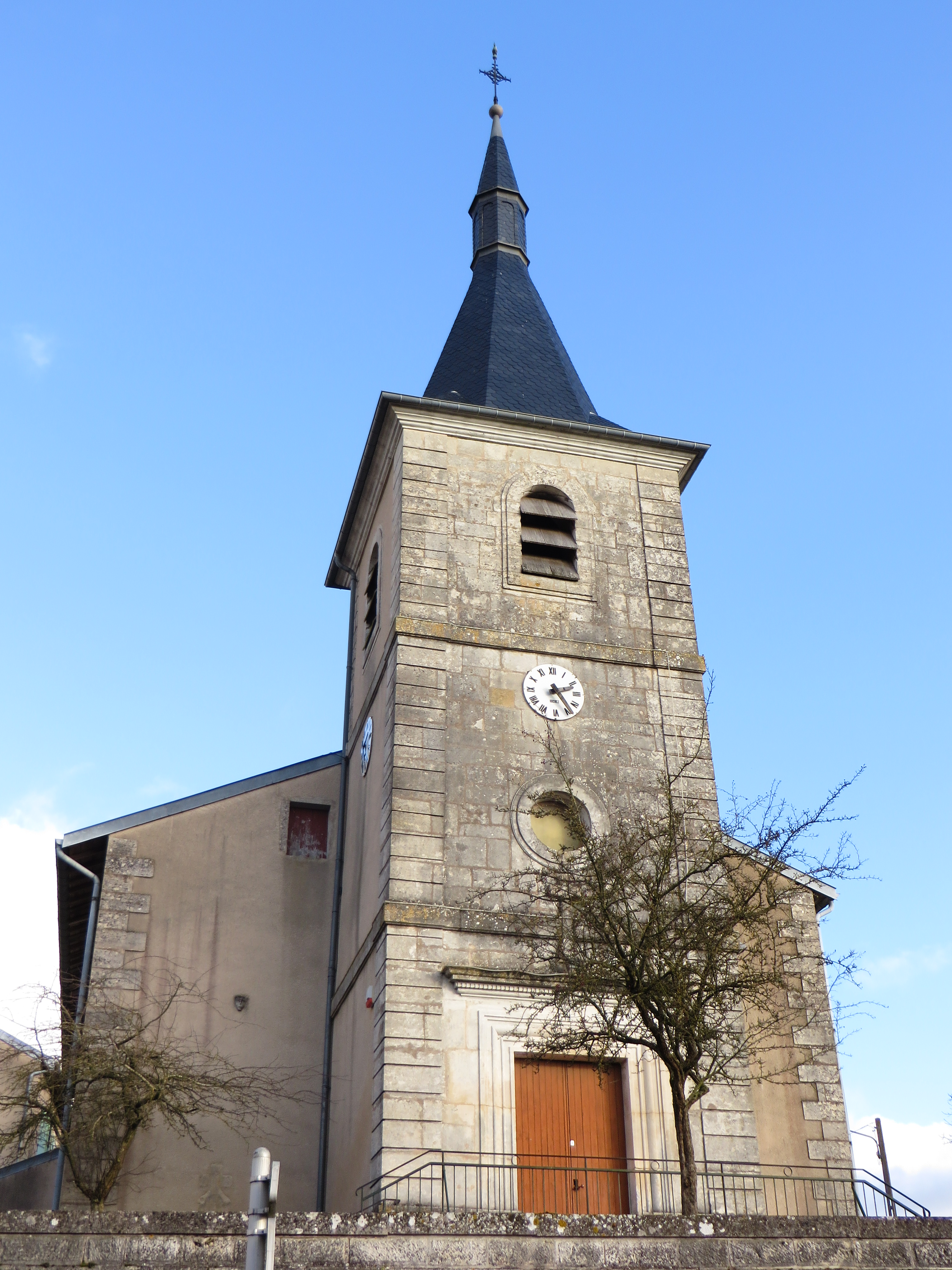
- The church in Manonville

- Coat of arms
- Location of Manonville
- Location within France Location within Grand Est
- Coordinates: 48°49′51″N 5°54′45″E
- Country: France
- Region: Grand Est
- Department: Meurthe-et-Moselle
- Arrondissement: Toul
- Canton: Le Nord-Toulois
- Intercommunality: CC Terres Touloises

Government
  - Mayor (2020–2026): Hervé Dohr
- Area^{1}: 9.43 km^{2} (3.64 sq mi)
- Elevation: 270 m (890 ft)
- Highest elevation: 307 m (1,007 ft)
- Lowest elevation: 218 m (715 ft)
- Population (2023): 221
  - Density: 23.4/km^{2} (60.7/sq mi)
- Time zone: UTC+01:00 (CET)
  - Summer (DST): UTC+02:00 (CEST)
- INSEE/Postal code: 54348 /54385
- ^{1} French Land Register data, which excludes lakes, ponds, glaciers > 1 km^{2} (0.386 sq mi or 247 acres) and river estuaries.

Manonville (French pronunciation: [manɔ̃vil]) is a commune in the Meurthe-et-Moselle department in north-eastern France.

== See also ==
- Communes of the Meurthe-et-Moselle department
- Parc naturel régional de Lorraine
