= Minorville =

- Commune
- Coat of arms
- Location of Minorville
- Location within France Location within Grand Est
- Coordinates: 48°49′03″N 5°53′30″E
- Country: France
- Region: Grand Est
- Department: Meurthe-et-Moselle
- Arrondissement: Toul
- Canton: Le Nord-Toulois
- Intercommunality: CC Terres Touloises

Government
  - Mayor (2020–2026): Philippe Hennebert
- Area^{1}: 12.65 km^{2} (4.88 sq mi)
- Elevation: 240 m (790 ft)
- Highest elevation: 253 m (830 ft)
- Lowest elevation: 226 m (741 ft)
- Population (2023): 227
  - Density: 17.9/km^{2} (46.5/sq mi)
- Time zone: UTC+01:00 (CET)
  - Summer (DST): UTC+02:00 (CEST)
- INSEE/Postal code: 54370 /54385
- ^{1} French Land Register data, which excludes lakes, ponds, glaciers > 1 km^{2} (0.386 sq mi or 247 acres) and river estuaries.

Minorville (French pronunciation: [minɔʁvil]) is a commune in the Meurthe-et-Moselle department in north-eastern France.

== See also ==
- Communes of the Meurthe-et-Moselle department
- Parc naturel régional de Lorraine
