= Tremblecourt =

- Commune
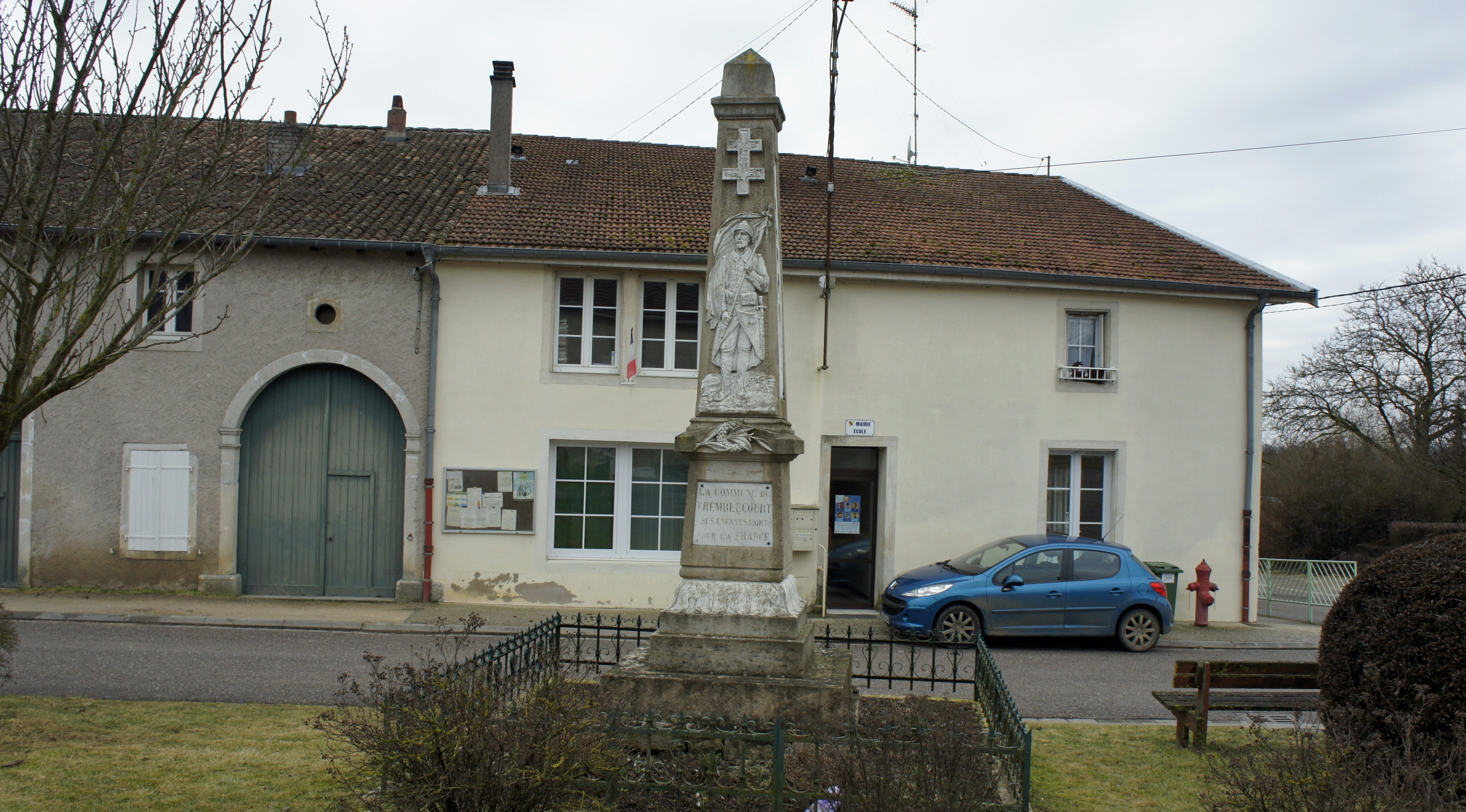
- The town hall in Tremblecourt

- Coat of arms
- Location of Tremblecourt
- Location within France Location within Grand Est
- Coordinates: 48°48′22″N 5°56′27″E
- Country: France
- Region: Grand Est
- Department: Meurthe-et-Moselle
- Arrondissement: Toul
- Canton: Le Nord-Toulois
- Intercommunality: CC Terres Touloises

Government
  - Mayor (2020–2026): Régis Favret
- Area^{1}: 6.08 km^{2} (2.35 sq mi)
- Elevation: 260 m (850 ft)
- Highest elevation: 316 m (1,037 ft)
- Lowest elevation: 223 m (732 ft)
- Population (2023): 155
  - Density: 25.5/km^{2} (66.0/sq mi)
- Time zone: UTC+01:00 (CET)
  - Summer (DST): UTC+02:00 (CEST)
- INSEE/Postal code: 54532 /54385
- ^{1} French Land Register data, which excludes lakes, ponds, glaciers > 1 km^{2} (0.386 sq mi or 247 acres) and river estuaries.

Tremblecourt (French pronunciation: [tʁɑ̃bləkuʁ]) is a commune in the Meurthe-et-Moselle department in north-eastern France.

== Geography ==
According to Corine Land Cover data, the 604 hectare communal area in 2011 comprised more than 77% arable land and meadows, 19% forest and only nearly 5% urbanised areas.

The territory is watered by the Naly-fontaine stream and has several springs, this stream is not recorded by the SANDRE . The average altitude of Tremblecourt is approximately 280 meters.

== See also ==
- Communes of the Meurthe-et-Moselle department
- Parc naturel régional de Lorraine
