= Francheville, Meurthe-et-Moselle =

Francheville
- Commune
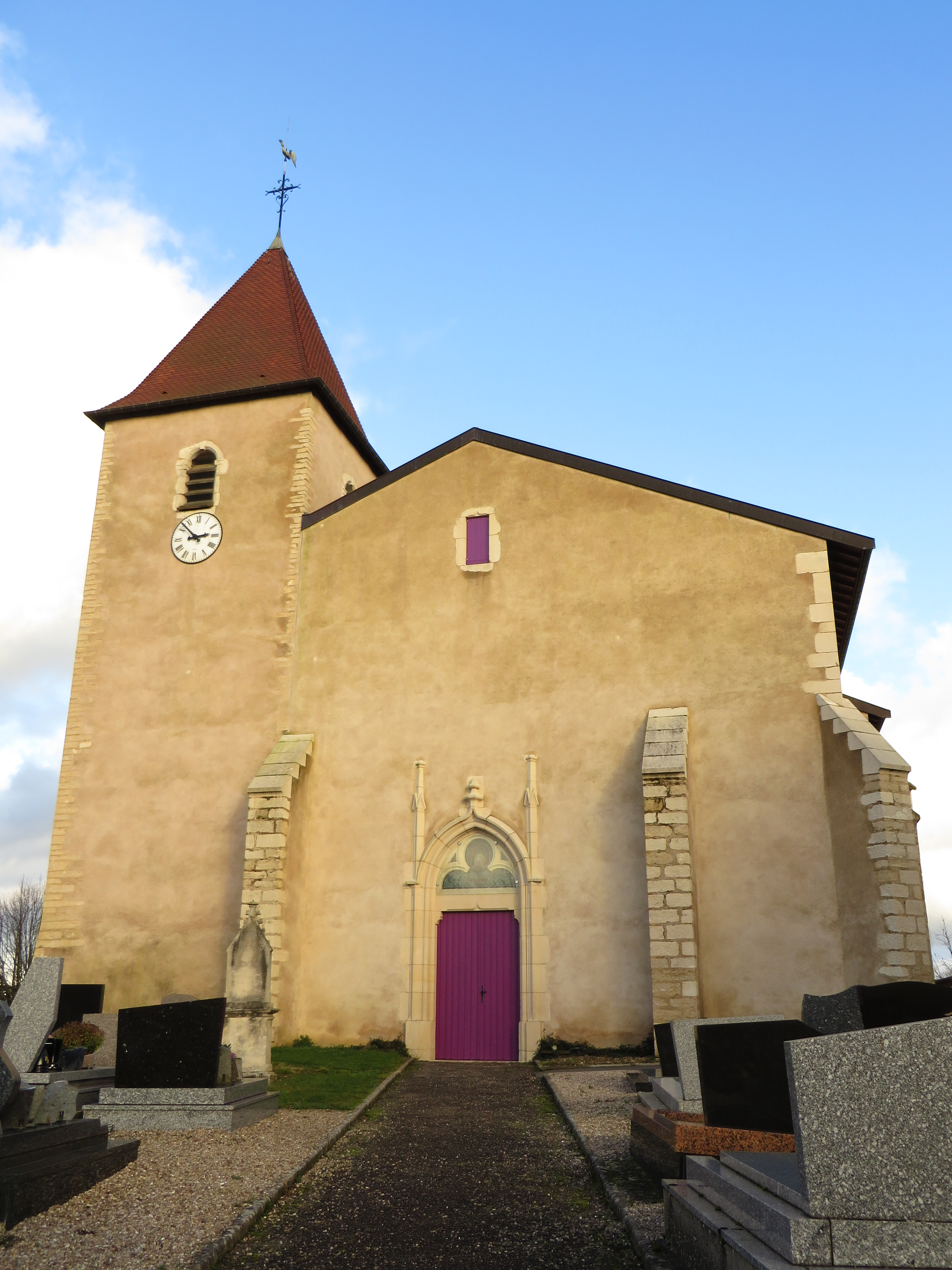
- The church in Francheville

- Coat of arms
- Location of Francheville
- Location within France Location within Grand Est
- Coordinates: 48°44′21″N 5°55′56″E
- Country: France
- Region: Grand Est
- Department: Meurthe-et-Moselle
- Arrondissement: Toul
- Canton: Le Nord-Toulois
- Intercommunality: CC Terres Touloises

Government
  - Mayor (2020–2026): Michel Rosso
- Area^{1}: 10.94 km^{2} (4.22 sq mi)
- Elevation: 210 m (690 ft)
- Highest elevation: 238 m (781 ft)
- Lowest elevation: 203 m (666 ft)
- Population (2023): 297
  - Density: 27.1/km^{2} (70.3/sq mi)
- Time zone: UTC+01:00 (CET)
  - Summer (DST): UTC+02:00 (CEST)
- INSEE/Postal code: 54208 /54200
- ^{1} French Land Register data, which excludes lakes, ponds, glaciers > 1 km^{2} (0.386 sq mi or 247 acres) and river estuaries.

Francheville (French pronunciation: [fʁɑ̃ʃvil]) is a commune in the Meurthe-et-Moselle department in north-eastern France.

== See also ==
- Communes of the Meurthe-et-Moselle department
