= Hamonville =

- Commune
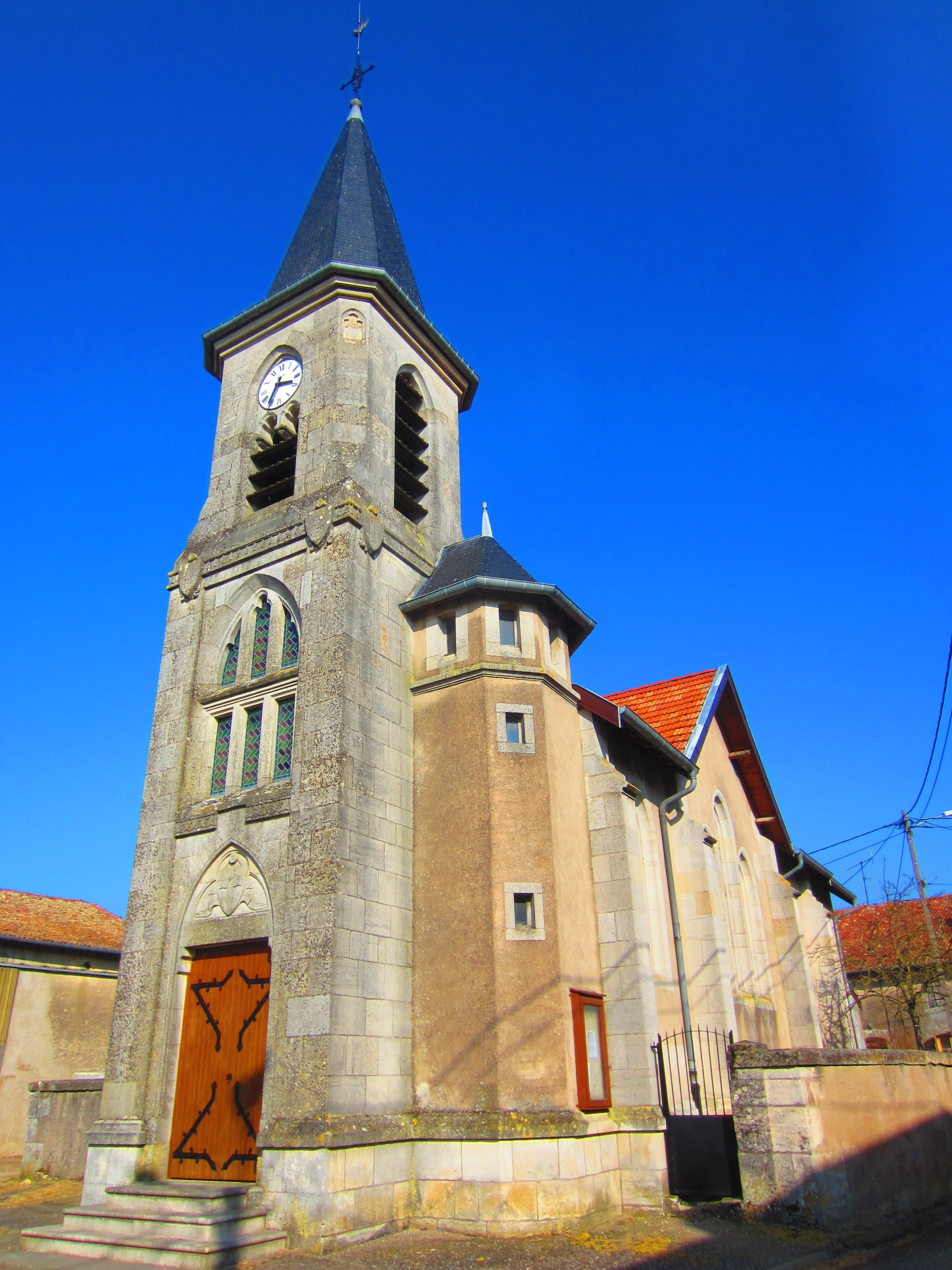
- The church in Hamonville

- Coat of arms
- Location of Hamonville
- Location within France Location within Grand Est
- Coordinates: 48°49′43″N 5°48′52″E
- Country: France
- Region: Grand Est
- Department: Meurthe-et-Moselle
- Arrondissement: Toul
- Canton: Le Nord-Toulois
- Intercommunality: CC Mad et Moselle

Government
  - Mayor (2020–2026): Patrice Velle
- Area^{1}: 6.66 km^{2} (2.57 sq mi)
- Elevation: 248 m (814 ft)
- Highest elevation: 267 m (876 ft)
- Lowest elevation: 234 m (768 ft)
- Population (2023): 94
  - Density: 14/km^{2} (37/sq mi)
- Time zone: UTC+01:00 (CET)
  - Summer (DST): UTC+02:00 (CEST)
- INSEE/Postal code: 54248 /54470
- ^{1} French Land Register data, which excludes lakes, ponds, glaciers > 1 km^{2} (0.386 sq mi or 247 acres) and river estuaries.

Hamonville (French pronunciation: [amɔ̃vil]) is a commune in the Meurthe-et-Moselle department in north-eastern France.

== See also ==
- Communes of the Meurthe-et-Moselle department
- Parc naturel régional de Lorraine
