= Avrainville, Meurthe-et-Moselle =

Avrainville
- Commune
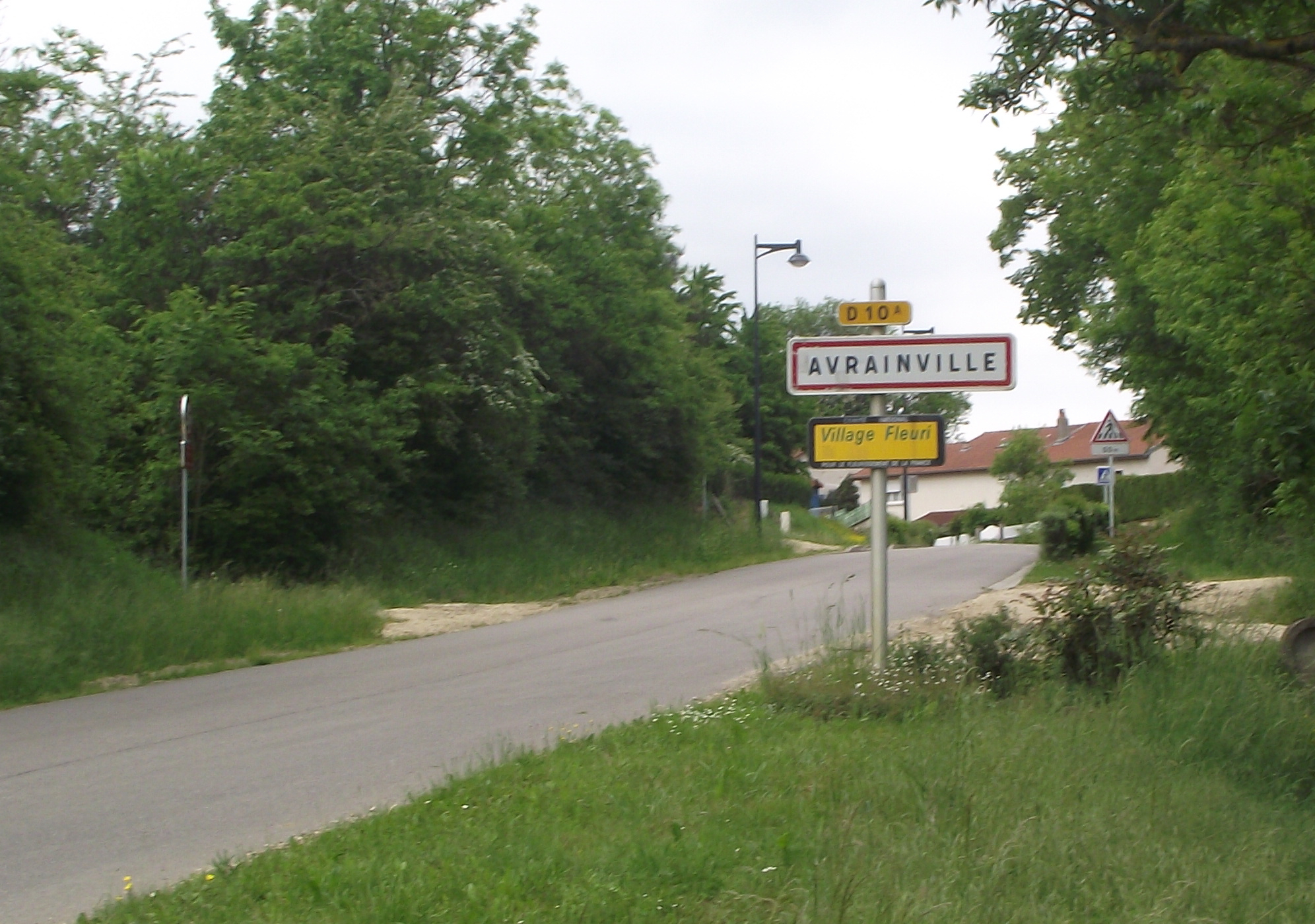
- The road into Avrainville

- Coat of arms
- Location of Avrainville
- Location within France Location within Grand Est
- Coordinates: 48°46′24″N 5°56′18″E
- Country: France
- Region: Grand Est
- Department: Meurthe-et-Moselle
- Arrondissement: Toul
- Canton: Le Nord-Toulois
- Intercommunality: CC Terres Touloises

Government
  - Mayor (2020–2026): Jean-Louis Claudon
- Area^{1}: 9.73 km^{2} (3.76 sq mi)
- Elevation: 240 m (790 ft)
- Highest elevation: 302 m (991 ft)
- Lowest elevation: 207 m (679 ft)
- Population (2023): 215
  - Density: 22.1/km^{2} (57.2/sq mi)
- Time zone: UTC+01:00 (CET)
  - Summer (DST): UTC+02:00 (CEST)
- INSEE/Postal code: 54034 /54385
- ^{1} French Land Register data, which excludes lakes, ponds, glaciers > 1 km^{2} (0.386 sq mi or 247 acres) and river estuaries.

Avrainville (French pronunciation: [avʁɛ̃vil]) is a commune in the Meurthe-et-Moselle department in northeastern France.

== Population ==
Historical population
Year	Pop.	±% p.a.
1968	166	—
1975	142	−2.21%
1982	132	−1.04%
1990	144	+1.09%
1999	170	+1.86%
2007	235	+4.13%
2012	205	−2.69%
2017	219	+1.33%
2023	215	−0.31%
Source: INSEE

== See also ==
- Communes of the Meurthe-et-Moselle department
