= Bouvron, Meurthe-et-Moselle =

Bouvron
- Commune
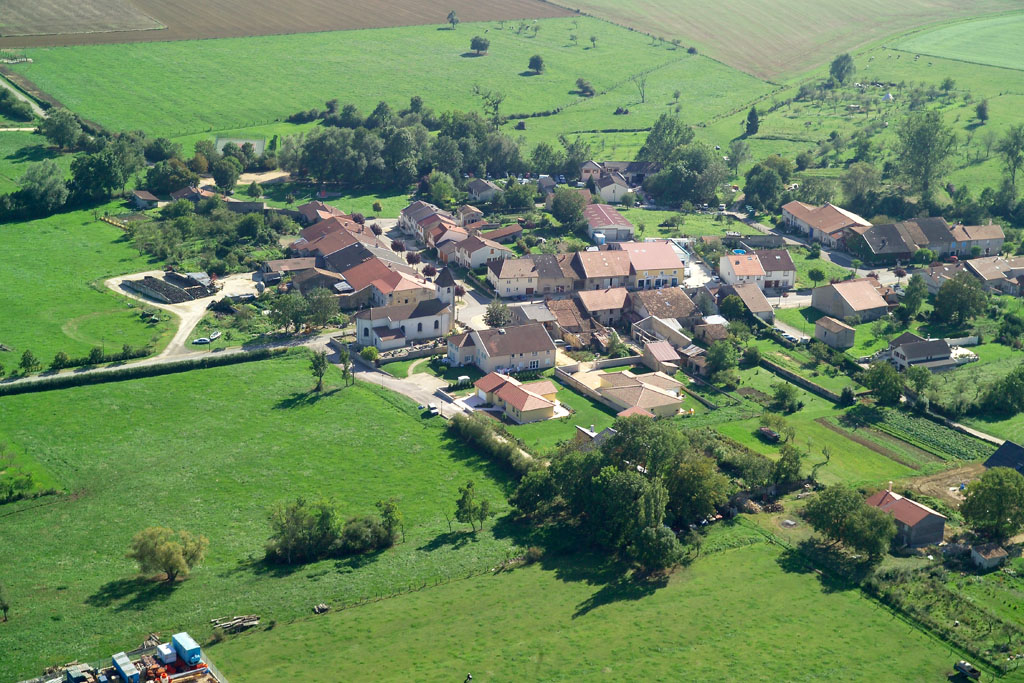
- An aerial view of Bouvron

- Coat of arms
- Location of Bouvron
- Location within France Location within Grand Est
- Coordinates: 48°44′32″N 5°52′51″E
- Country: France
- Region: Grand Est
- Department: Meurthe-et-Moselle
- Arrondissement: Toul
- Canton: Le Nord-Toulois
- Intercommunality: Terres Touloises

Government
  - Mayor (2020–2026): Jean-Luc Lelievre
- Area^{1}: 10 km^{2} (3.9 sq mi)
- Population (2023): 196
  - Density: 20/km^{2} (51/sq mi)
- Time zone: UTC+01:00 (CET)
  - Summer (DST): UTC+02:00 (CEST)
- INSEE/Postal code: 54088 /54200
- ^{1} French Land Register data, which excludes lakes, ponds, glaciers > 1 km^{2} (0.386 sq mi or 247 acres) and river estuaries.

Bouvron (French pronunciation: [buvʁɔ̃]) is a commune in the Meurthe-et-Moselle department in northeastern France.

== Administration ==
List of mayors
Term	Name
2001–2008	Michel Lelu
2008–2014	Daniel Grojean
2015–incumbent	Jean-Luc Lelievre

== Population ==
Historical population
Year	Pop.	±% p.a.
1968	123	—
1975	107	−1.97%
1982	112	+0.65%
1990	132	+2.08%
1999	194	+4.37%
2007	236	+2.48%
2012	250	+1.16%
2017	241	−0.73%
2023	196	−3.39%
Source: INSEE

== See also ==
- Communes of the Meurthe-et-Moselle department
