= Canton of Le Nord-Toulois =

Canton in Grand Est, France

Coordinates: 48.75°N 6.06°E

The canton of Le Nord-Toulois is an administrative division of the Meurthe-et-Moselle department, northeastern France. It was created at the French canton reorganisation which came into effect in March 2015. Its seat is in Liverdun.

It consists of the following communes:

1. Aingeray
2. Andilly
3. Ansauville
4. Avrainville
5. Beaumont
6. Bernécourt
7. Bois-de-Haye
8. Boucq
9. Bouillonville
10. Bouvron
11. Bruley
12. Charey
13. Domèvre-en-Haye
14. Dommartin-la-Chaussée
15. Essey-et-Maizerais
16. Euvezin
17. Flirey
18. Fontenoy-sur-Moselle
19. Francheville
20. Gézoncourt
21. Gondreville
22. Griscourt
23. Grosrouvres
24. Hamonville
25. Jaillon
26. Jaulny
27. Lagney
28. Limey-Remenauville
29. Lironville
30. Liverdun
31. Lucey
32. Mamey
33. Mandres-aux-Quatre-Tours
34. Manoncourt-en-Woëvre
35. Manonville
36. Martincourt
37. Ménil-la-Tour
38. Minorville
39. Noviant-aux-Prés
40. Pannes
41. Rembercourt-sur-Mad
42. Rogéville
43. Rosières-en-Haye
44. Royaumeix
45. Saint-Baussant
46. Saizerais
47. Sanzey
48. Seicheprey
49. Thiaucourt-Regniéville
50. Tremblecourt
51. Trondes
52. Viéville-en-Haye
53. Vilcey-sur-Trey
54. Villers-en-Haye
55. Villey-Saint-Étienne
56. Xammes
