= Canton of Toul-Sud =

Former canton in Meurthe-et-Moselle, France

Coordinates: 48°37′41″N 5°50′02″E

- Former canton
- Location of the canton in the arrondissement of Toul
- Country: France
- Region: Grand Est
- Department: Meurthe-et-Moselle
- No. of communes: {{{nbcomm}}}
- Disbanded: 2015

Government
  - Representatives: Alde Harmand
- Population (2012): 14,770

The canton of Toul-Sud (French: Canton de Toul-Sud) is a former French canton located in the department of Meurthe-et-Moselle in the Lorraine region (now part of Grand Est). It is now part of the canton of Toul and canton of Meine au Saintois.

The last general councillor from this canton was Alde Harmand (PS), elected in 2004.

== Composition ==
The canton of Toul-Sud is made up of a fraction of the commune of Toul and 16 other communes and had 14,770 inhabitants (2012 census without double counts).

1. Bicqueley
2. Blénod-lès-Toul
3. Bulligny
4. Charmes-la-Côte
5. Chaudeney-sur-Moselle
6. Choloy-Ménillot
7. Crézilles
8. Domgermain
9. Gye
10. Mont-le-Vignoble
11. Moutrot
12. Ochey
13. Pierre-la-Treiche
14. Sexey-aux-Forges
15. Toul
16. Villey-le-Sec
