= Côtes de Toul =

French wine

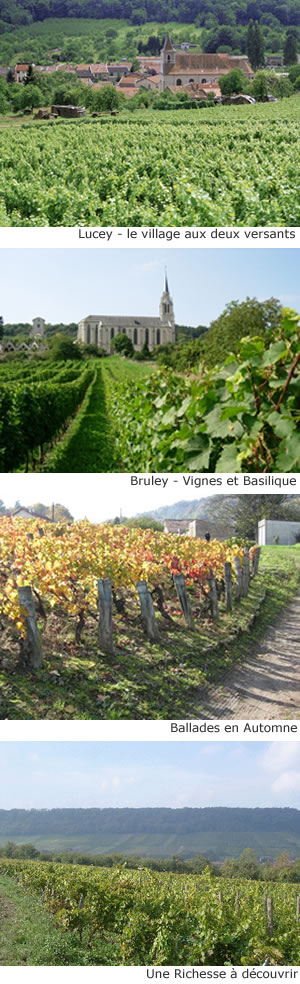
Various vineyards in Côtes de Toul

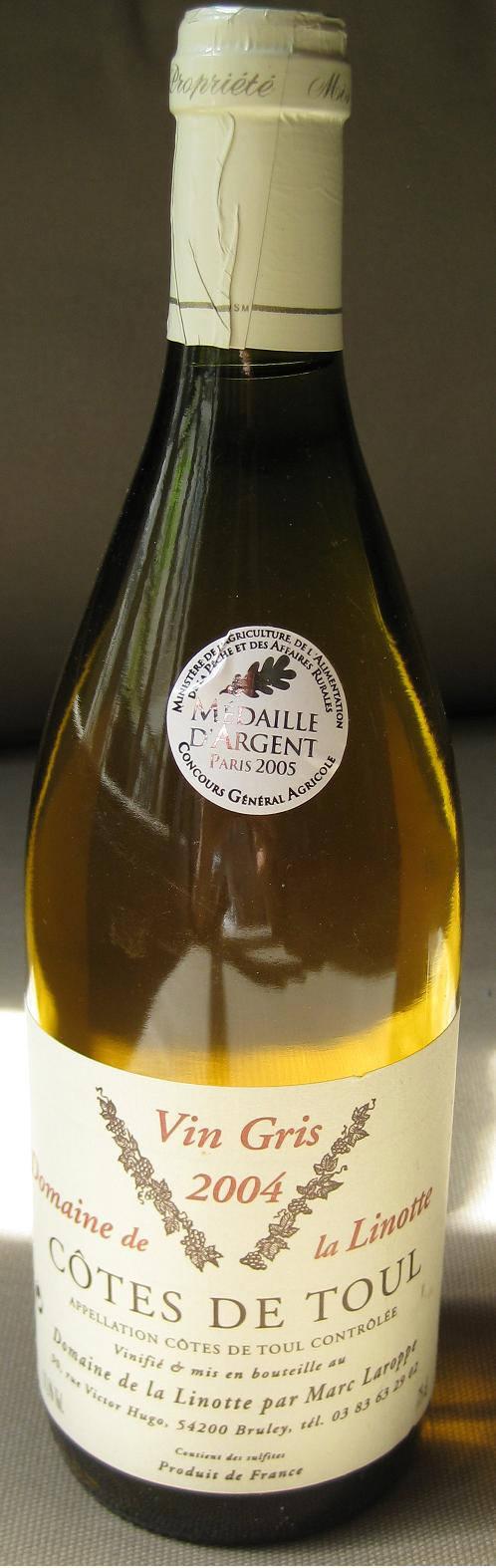
A bottle of Vin Gris from Côtes de Toul

Côtes de Toul (French pronunciation: [kot də tul]) is an Appellation d'Origine Contrôlée (AOC) for French wine produced in the département of Meurthe-et-Moselle in the Lorraine région. The Côtes de Toul vineyards cover 110 hectares (270 acres) in an area close to Toul, to the west of the city of Nancy. The area of production includes the following communes: Blénod-lès-Toul, Bruley, Bulligny, Charmes-la-Côte, Domgermain, Lucey, Mont-le-Vignoble and Pagney-derrière-Barine. Annual production is 4,500 hectoliters, corresponding to 600,000 bottles.

Côtes de Toul has been classified as an AOC since 1998, when it was promoted from its previous VDQS status. Together with the other Lorraine wine designations, AOC Moselle and Vin de Pays de la Meuse, the produce of the 200 hectares (490 acres) of Lorraine vineyards is often referred to in French as Vins de l'est, "wines of the east".

Most Côtes de Toul and other Lorraine wines are consumed in Lorraine itself, with only a small proportion reaching the rest of France and nearby export markets.

== Wine styles ==
Côtes de Toul exists as white, red and rosé wine, the latter under the designation Vin Gris. Gamay-dominated Vin gris is the most common wine, supplemented primarily by Auxerrois blanc-based white wines and relatively light red wines from Pinot noir.

== History ==
While Lorraine as such is not thought of as a wine region today, the region has a viticultural history going back to Roman times, and winemaking became important during the 15th century due to the Dukes of Lorraine and the Bishops of Toul, with the mid-17th century claimed to have been a particularly successful period. The region's wine industry remained substantial up until the 19th century. In similarity to many other northern French wine areas, such as those in Yonne, the combination of increased competition from Languedoc-Roussillon following the introduction of railroad transport, and the Phylloxera epidemic (followed by replanting with grape varieties unsuitable for quality wine production) contributed to the demise of the region's wine production. In the case of Lorraine, industrialisation, destruction during World War I and the delimitation of the nearby Champagne region also contributed. Before the delimitation, Lorraine grapes would go into Champagne.

Around 1930, a handful of local growers embarked on a programme of replanting with grafted quality grape varieties, which laid the foundation for the VDQS designation awarded in 1951. The coveted AOC designation followed on March 31, 1998.

== AOC regulations ==
=== Grape varieties ===
The grape varieties allowed in Côtes de Toul are the following:

- For white wine: Aubin blanc (a local speciality) and Auxerrois blanc.
- For red wine: Pinot noir only.
- For vin gris (rosé wine): Gamay (the most common grape variety in the AOC) and Pinot noir as the main grape varieties, and Aubin blanc, Auxerrois blanc and Pinot Meunier as accessory grape varieties. For Vin Gris, at least two grape varieties must be used, and the major grape variety is not allowed to exceed 85%. At least 10% Pinot noir must be used, and the total proportion of accessory grape varieties is not allowed to exceed 15%.

=== Other requirements ===
The allowed base yield is 60 hectoliter per hectare for white wine and Vin Gris, and 45 hl/ha for red wine. The minimum required grape maturity is 9.5% potential alcohol for Vin Gris, 10% for white wine, and 10.5% for red wine.
