= Dommartin-lès-Toul =

- Commune
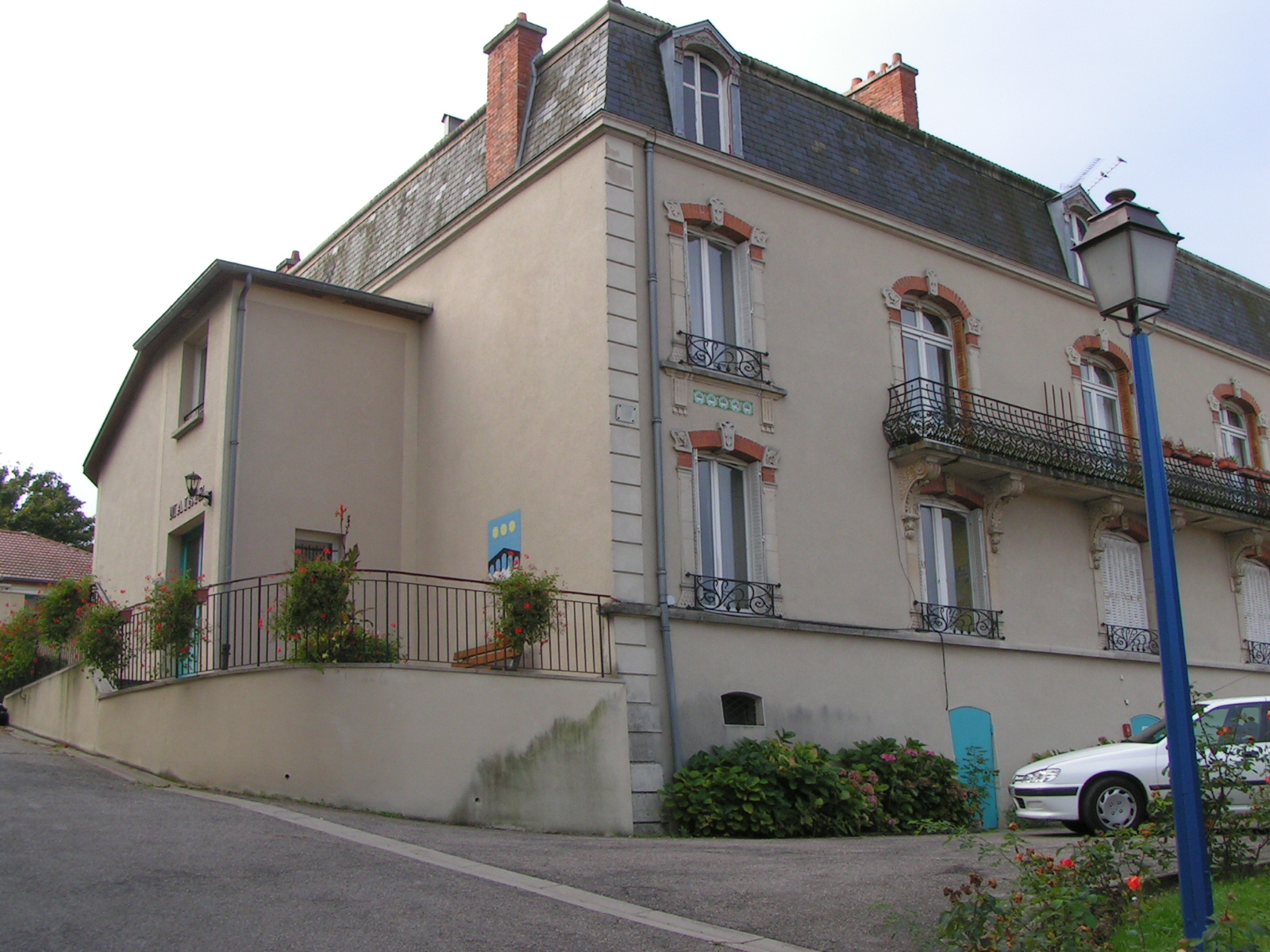
- The town hall

- Coat of arms
- Location of Dommartin-lès-Toul
- Location within France Location within Grand Est
- Coordinates: 48°40′14″N 5°54′31″E
- Country: France
- Region: Grand Est
- Department: Meurthe-et-Moselle
- Arrondissement: Toul
- Canton: Toul
- Intercommunality: Terres Touloises

Government
  - Mayor (2020–2026): Laurent Guyot
- Area^{1}: 6.87 km^{2} (2.65 sq mi)
- Elevation: 240 m (790 ft)
- Highest elevation: 295 m (968 ft)
- Lowest elevation: 201 m (659 ft)
- Population (2023): 2,013
  - Density: 293/km^{2} (759/sq mi)
- Time zone: UTC+01:00 (CET)
  - Summer (DST): UTC+02:00 (CEST)
- INSEE/Postal code: 54167 /54200
- ^{1} French Land Register data, which excludes lakes, ponds, glaciers > 1 km^{2} (0.386 sq mi or 247 acres) and river estuaries.

Dommartin-lès-Toul (French pronunciation: [dɔmaʁtɛ̃ lɛ tul], literally Dommartin near Toul) is a commune in the Meurthe-et-Moselle department in north-eastern France.

== Population ==
Historical population
Year	Pop.	±% p.a.
1968	1,004	—
1975	1,218	+2.80%
1982	1,714	+5.00%
1990	1,639	−0.56%
1999	1,644	+0.03%
2007	1,956	+2.20%
2012	2,001	+0.46%
2017	1,984	−0.17%
2023	2,013	+0.24%
Source: INSEE

== See also ==
- Communes of the Meurthe-et-Moselle department
