= Aubin blanc =

French wine

- Grape (Vitis)
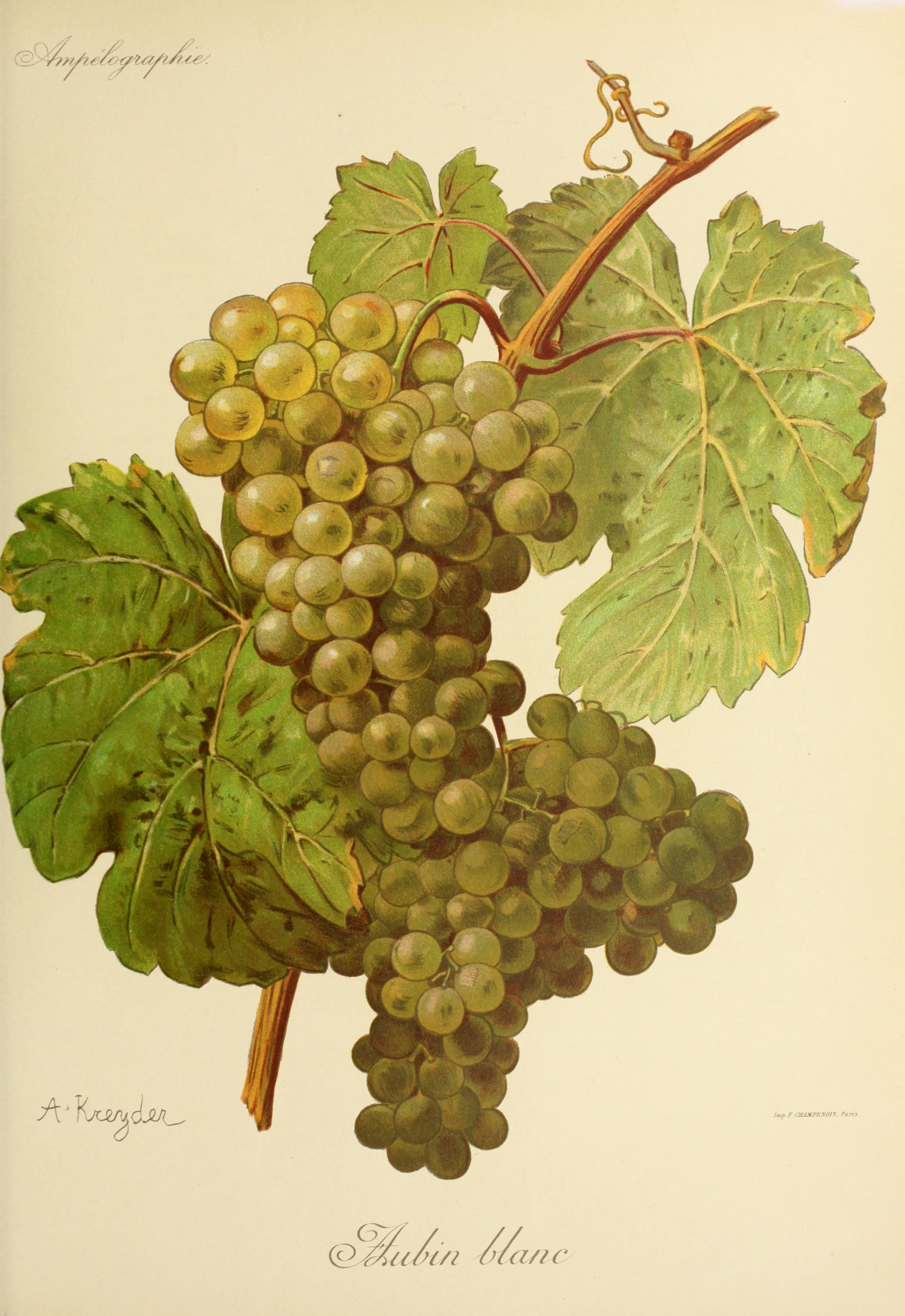
- Aubin blanc grapes
- Color of berry skin: Blanc
- Species: Vitis vinifera
- Also called: Aubin (more)
- Origin: Lorraine
- Notable regions: Upper Moselle valley
- Notable wines: Côtes de Toul
- VIVC number: 759

Aubin blanc (or simply Aubin) is a white wine grape from the upper reaches of the Moselle valley in eastern France.

== History ==
DNA fingerprinting has shown that Aubin is the result of a cross between Gouais blanc and Savagnin. Gouais blanc was widely grown by the French peasantry in the Medieval age, and it is a parent of Chardonnay and Aubin vert among others. Savagnin is common in Jura wine (including Vin jaune), and is a variety in the Traminer family which also includes Gewürztraminer.

== Viticulture ==
There's usually a reason why grapes like this are in decline. The Traminer family are notoriously difficult to grow, with poor disease resistance and low yields.

== Wine regions ==
Aubin blanc is only found blended into wines from the Côtes de Toul appellation in Lorraine.

== Synonyms ==
Albin Blanc, Aneb ben Cadi, Aubin, Blanc de Magny, Gros Vert de Crenay

== See also ==
- Toul, the grape's home town
