= Écrouves =

- Commune
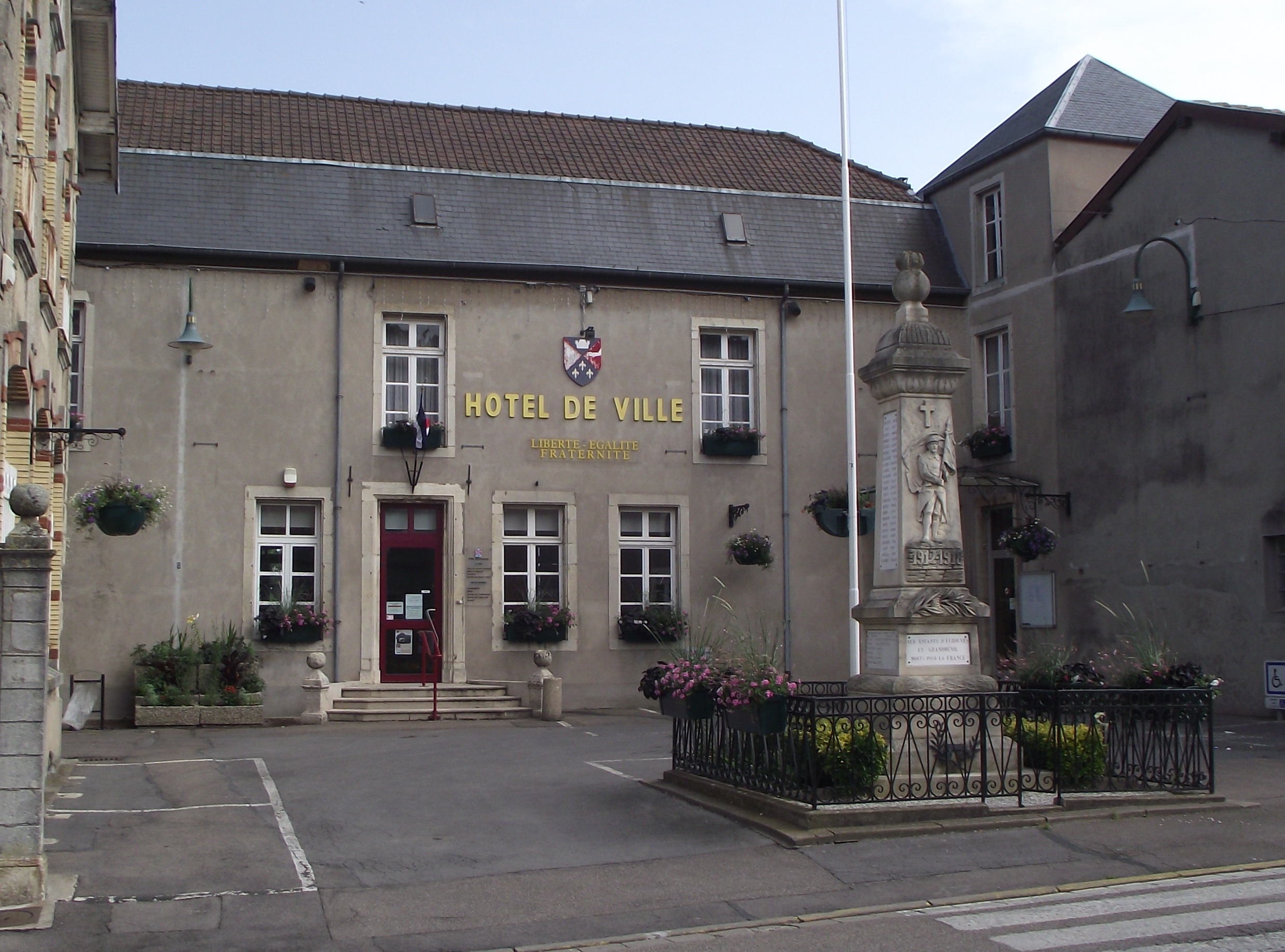
- The town hall in Écrouves

- Coat of arms
- Location of Écrouves
- Location within France Location within Grand Est
- Coordinates: 48°40′50″N 5°50′29″E
- Country: France
- Region: Grand Est
- Department: Meurthe-et-Moselle
- Arrondissement: Toul
- Canton: Toul
- Intercommunality: Terres Touloises

Government
  - Mayor (2020–2026): Roger Sillaire
- Area^{1}: 10.3 km^{2} (4.0 sq mi)
- Elevation: 245 m (804 ft)
- Highest elevation: 385 m (1,263 ft)
- Lowest elevation: 212 m (696 ft)
- Population (2023): 4,474
  - Density: 434/km^{2} (1,130/sq mi)
- Demonym: Scrofuliens
- Time zone: UTC+01:00 (CET)
  - Summer (DST): UTC+02:00 (CEST)
- INSEE/Postal code: 54174 /54200
- ^{1} French Land Register data, which excludes lakes, ponds, glaciers > 1 km^{2} (0.386 sq mi or 247 acres) and river estuaries.

Écrouves (French pronunciation: [ekʁuv]) is a commune in the Meurthe-et-Moselle department in north-eastern France.

== Population ==
Historical population
Year	Pop.	±% p.a.
1968	3,580	—
1975	3,703	+0.48%
1982	3,758	+0.21%
1990	3,691	−0.22%
1999	3,670	−0.06%
2007	4,136	+1.51%
2012	4,525	+1.81%
2017	4,376	−0.67%
2023	4,474	+0.37%
Source: INSEE

== See also ==
- Communes of the Meurthe-et-Moselle department
- Parc naturel régional de Lorraine
