= Pierre-la-Treiche =

- Commune
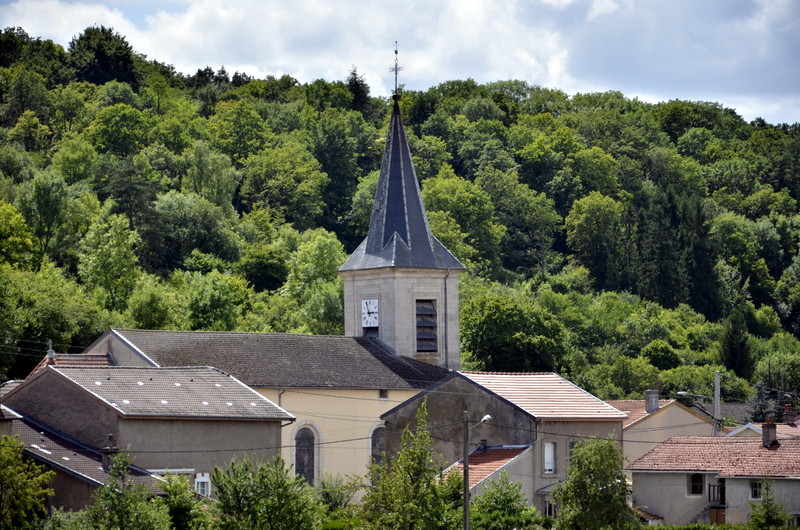
- The church in Pierre-la-Treiche

- Coat of arms
- Location of Pierre-la-Treiche
- Location within France Location within Grand Est
- Coordinates: 48°38′37″N 5°55′51″E
- Country: France
- Region: Grand Est
- Department: Meurthe-et-Moselle
- Arrondissement: Toul
- Canton: Toul
- Intercommunality: Terres Touloises

Government
  - Mayor (2020–2026): Xavier Colin
- Area^{1}: 12.85 km^{2} (4.96 sq mi)
- Elevation: 210 m (690 ft)
- Highest elevation: 350 m (1,150 ft)
- Lowest elevation: 206 m (676 ft)
- Population (2023): 472
  - Density: 36.7/km^{2} (95.1/sq mi)
- Time zone: UTC+01:00 (CET)
  - Summer (DST): UTC+02:00 (CEST)
- INSEE/Postal code: 54426 /54200
- ^{1} French Land Register data, which excludes lakes, ponds, glaciers > 1 km^{2} (0.386 sq mi or 247 acres) and river estuaries.

Pierre-la-Treiche (French pronunciation: [pjɛʁ la tʁɛʃ]) is a commune in the Meurthe-et-Moselle department in north-eastern France.

== See also ==
- Communes of the Meurthe-et-Moselle department
