= Gye, Meurthe-et-Moselle =

Gye
- Commune
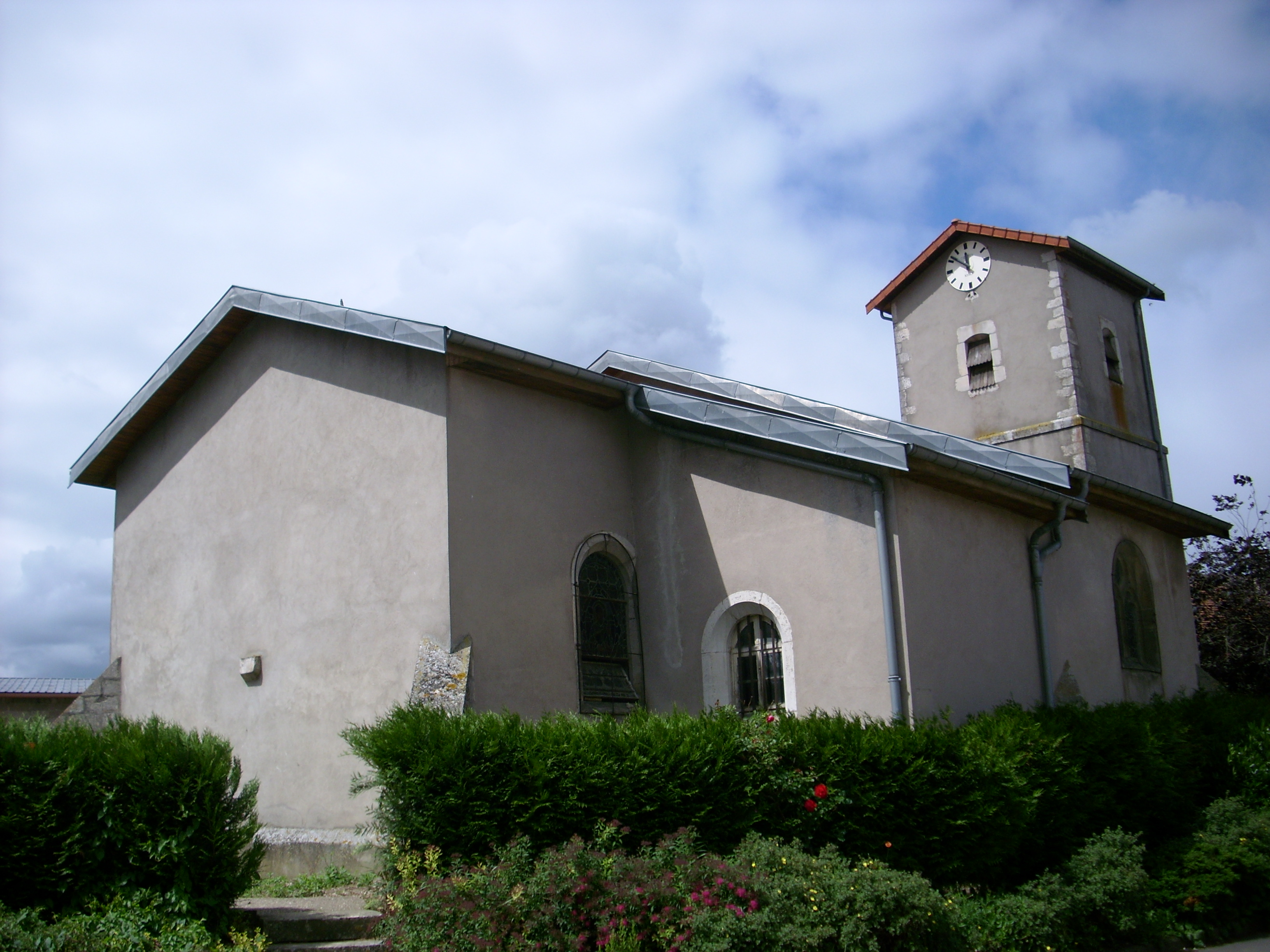
- The church in Gye

- Coat of arms
- Location of Gye
- Location within France Location within Grand Est
- Coordinates: 48°37′15″N 5°52′35″E
- Country: France
- Region: Grand Est
- Department: Meurthe-et-Moselle
- Arrondissement: Toul
- Canton: Toul
- Intercommunality: Terres Touloises

Government
  - Mayor (2020–2026): Michel Noisette
- Area^{1}: 6.51 km^{2} (2.51 sq mi)
- Elevation: 235 m (771 ft)
- Highest elevation: 252 m (827 ft)
- Lowest elevation: 214 m (702 ft)
- Population (2023): 283
  - Density: 43.5/km^{2} (113/sq mi)
- Time zone: UTC+01:00 (CET)
  - Summer (DST): UTC+02:00 (CEST)
- INSEE/Postal code: 54242 /54113
- ^{1} French Land Register data, which excludes lakes, ponds, glaciers > 1 km^{2} (0.386 sq mi or 247 acres) and river estuaries.

Gye (French pronunciation: [ʒi]) is a commune in the Meurthe-et-Moselle department in north-eastern France.

== See also ==
- Communes of the Meurthe-et-Moselle department
