= Villey-le-Sec =

- Commune
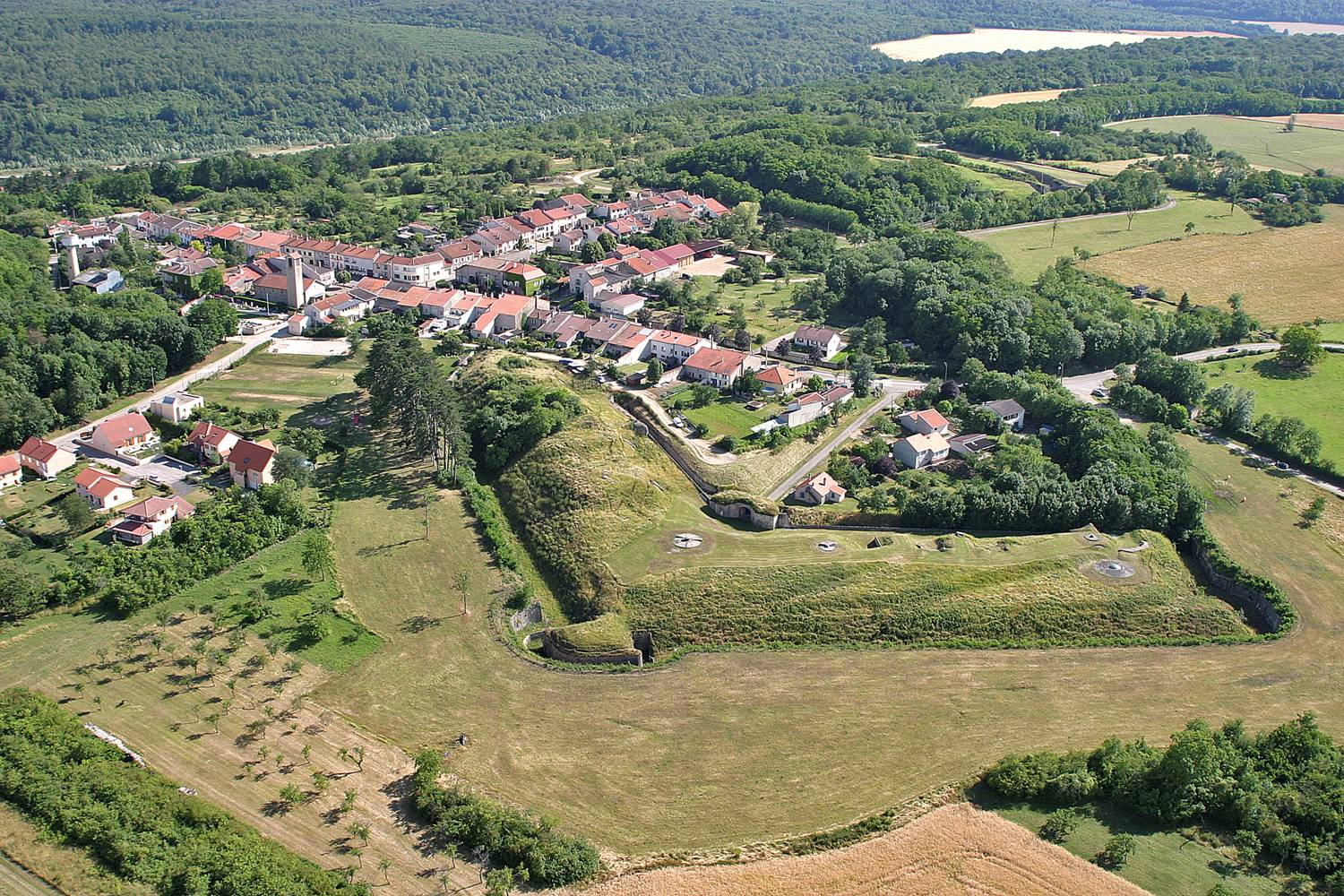
- View of the village

- Coat of arms
- Location of Villey-le-Sec
- Location within France Location within Grand Est
- Coordinates: 48°39′35″N 5°58′39″E
- Country: France
- Region: Grand Est
- Department: Meurthe-et-Moselle
- Arrondissement: Toul
- Canton: Toul
- Intercommunality: CC Terres Touloises

Government
  - Mayor (2020–2026): Gilles Guyot
- Area^{1}: 6.4 km^{2} (2.5 sq mi)
- Elevation: 329 m (1,079 ft)
- Highest elevation: 340 m (1,120 ft)
- Lowest elevation: 207 m (679 ft)
- Population (2023): 419
  - Density: 65/km^{2} (170/sq mi)
- Time zone: UTC+01:00 (CET)
  - Summer (DST): UTC+02:00 (CEST)
- INSEE/Postal code: 54583 /54840
- ^{1} French Land Register data, which excludes lakes, ponds, glaciers > 1 km^{2} (0.386 sq mi or 247 acres) and river estuaries.

Villey-le-Sec (French pronunciation: [vilɛ lə sɛk]) is a commune in the Meurthe-et-Moselle department in north-eastern France.

== See also ==
- Communes of the Meurthe-et-Moselle department
