= Canton of Toul =

Canton in Grand Est, France

Coordinates: 48.68°N 5.89°E

The canton of Toul is an administrative division of the Meurthe-et-Moselle department, northeastern France. It was created at the French canton reorganisation which came into effect in March 2015. Its seat is in Toul.

It consists of the following communes:

1. Bicqueley
2. Charmes-la-Côte
3. Chaudeney-sur-Moselle
4. Choloy-Ménillot
5. Dommartin-lès-Toul
6. Domgermain
7. Écrouves
8. Foug
9. Gye
10. Laneuveville-derrière-Foug
11. Lay-Saint-Remy
12. Pagney-derrière-Barine
13. Pierre-la-Treiche
14. Toul
15. Villey-le-Sec
