= Chaudeney-sur-Moselle =

- Commune
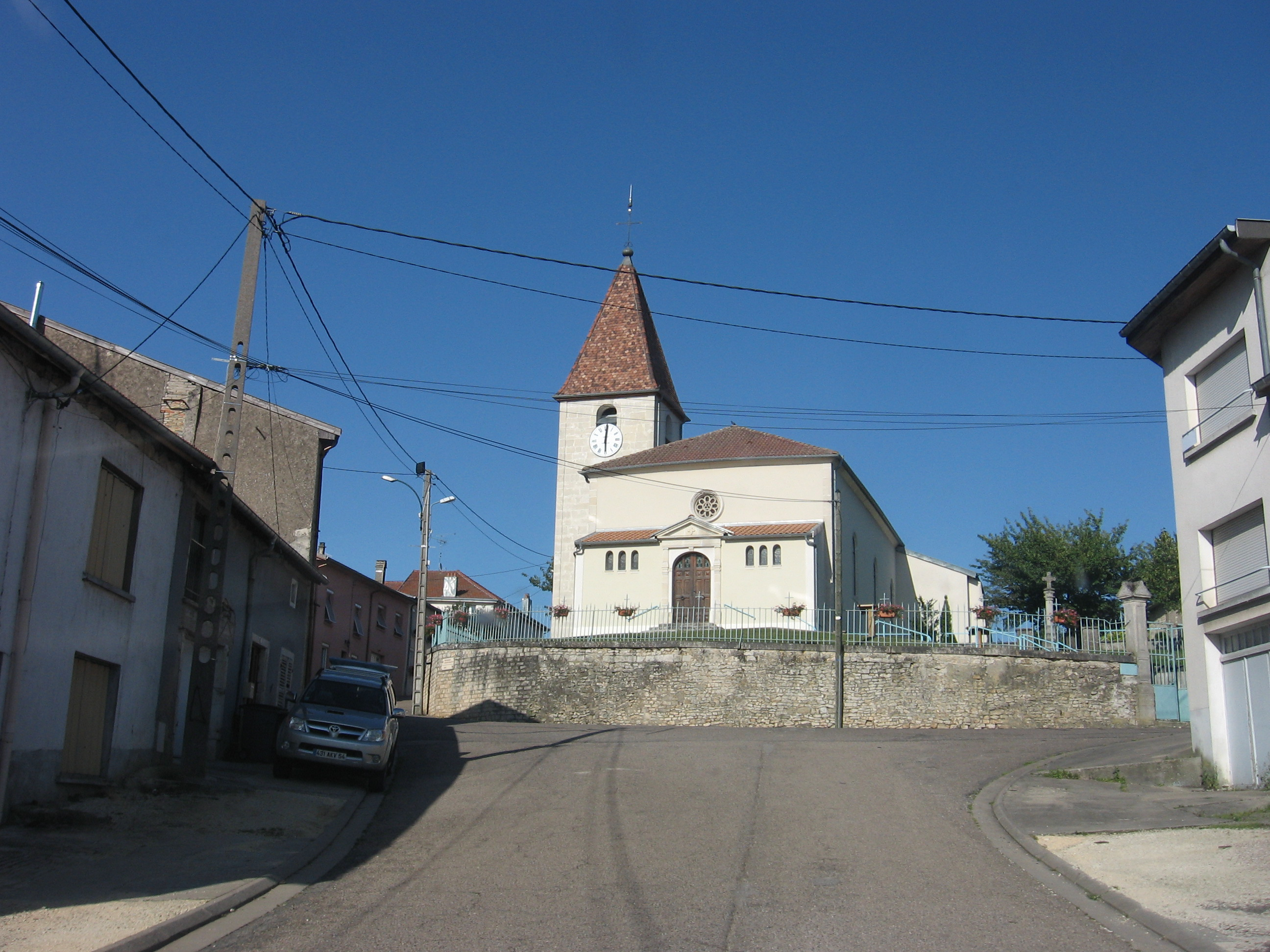
- The church in Chaudeney-sur-Moselle

- Coat of arms
- Location of Chaudeney-sur-Moselle
- Location within France Location within Grand Est
- Coordinates: 48°39′08″N 5°54′20″E
- Country: France
- Region: Grand Est
- Department: Meurthe-et-Moselle
- Arrondissement: Toul
- Canton: Toul
- Intercommunality: Terres Touloises

Government
  - Mayor (2020–2026): Emmanuel Payeur
- Area^{1}: 8.34 km^{2} (3.22 sq mi)
- Elevation: 212 m (696 ft)
- Highest elevation: 311 m (1,020 ft)
- Lowest elevation: 202 m (663 ft)
- Population (2023): 730
  - Density: 88/km^{2} (230/sq mi)
- Time zone: UTC+01:00 (CET)
  - Summer (DST): UTC+02:00 (CEST)
- INSEE/Postal code: 54122 /54200
- ^{1} French Land Register data, which excludes lakes, ponds, glaciers > 1 km^{2} (0.386 sq mi or 247 acres) and river estuaries.

Chaudeney-sur-Moselle (French pronunciation: [ʃodnɛ syʁ mɔzɛl], literally Chaudeney on Moselle) is a commune in the Meurthe-et-Moselle department in north-eastern France.

== See also ==
- Communes of the Meurthe-et-Moselle department
