= Pagney-derrière-Barine =

- Commune
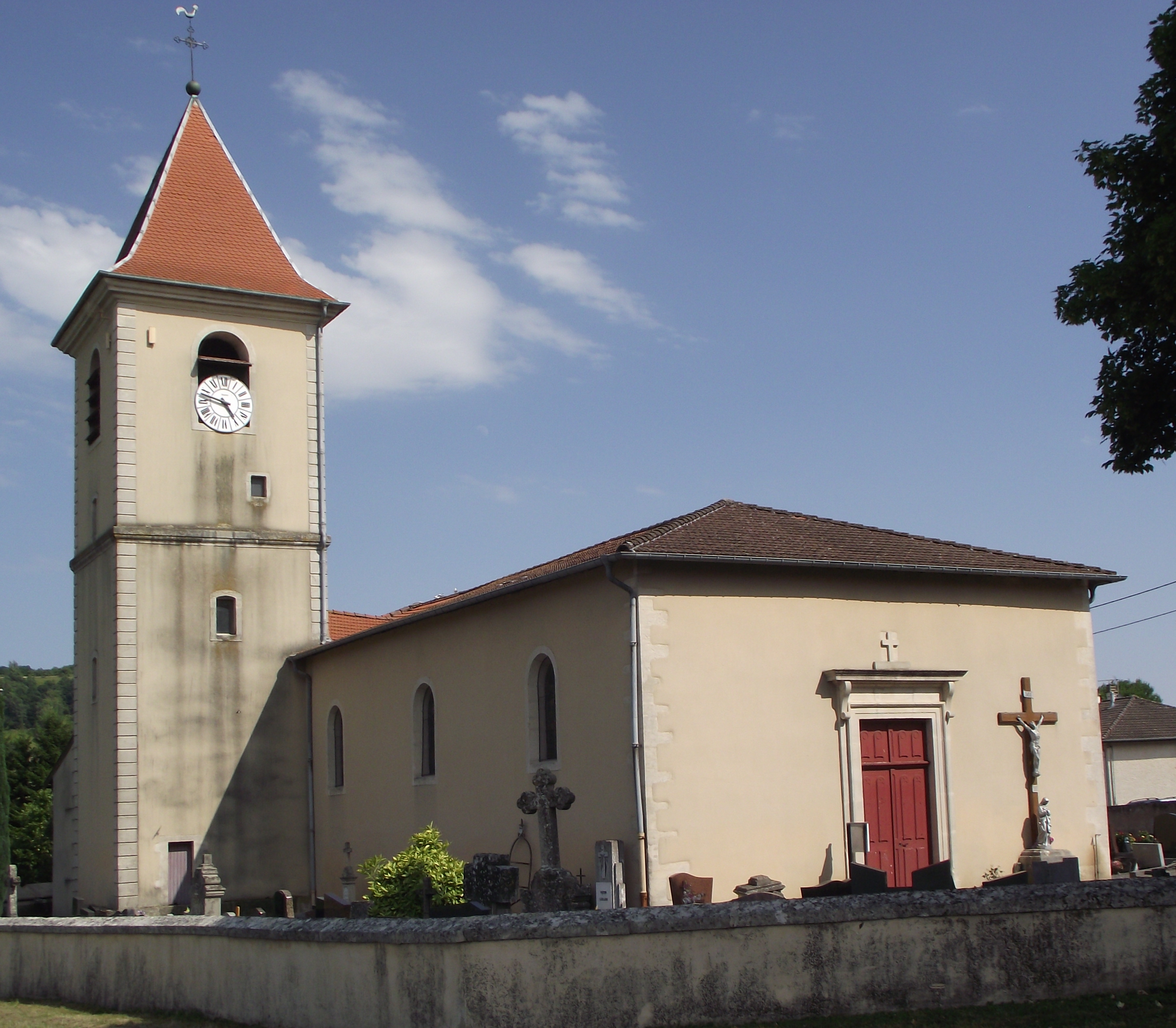
- The church in Pagney-derrière-Barine

- Coat of arms
- Location of Pagney-derrière-Barine
- Location within France Location within Grand Est
- Coordinates: 48°41′38″N 5°50′39″E
- Country: France
- Region: Grand Est
- Department: Meurthe-et-Moselle
- Arrondissement: Toul
- Canton: Toul
- Intercommunality: Terres Touloises

Government
  - Mayor (2020–2026): Jean-François Matte
- Area^{1}: 6.13 km^{2} (2.37 sq mi)
- Elevation: 280 m (920 ft)
- Highest elevation: 377 m (1,237 ft)
- Lowest elevation: 219 m (719 ft)
- Population (2023): 646
  - Density: 105/km^{2} (273/sq mi)
- Time zone: UTC+01:00 (CET)
  - Summer (DST): UTC+02:00 (CEST)
- INSEE/Postal code: 54414 /54200
- ^{1} French Land Register data, which excludes lakes, ponds, glaciers > 1 km^{2} (0.386 sq mi or 247 acres) and river estuaries.

Pagney-derrière-Barine (French pronunciation: [paɲɛ dɛʁjɛʁ baʁin]) is a commune in the Meurthe-et-Moselle department in north-eastern France.

== Population ==
Historical population
Year	Pop.	±% p.a.
1968	409	—
1975	405	−0.14%
1982	439	+1.16%
1990	539	+2.60%
1999	563	+0.49%
2007	567	+0.09%
2012	602	+1.21%
2017	631	+0.95%
2023	646	+0.39%
Source: INSEE

== See also ==
- Communes of the Meurthe-et-Moselle department
- Parc naturel régional de Lorraine
