= Mont-le-Vignoble =

- Commune
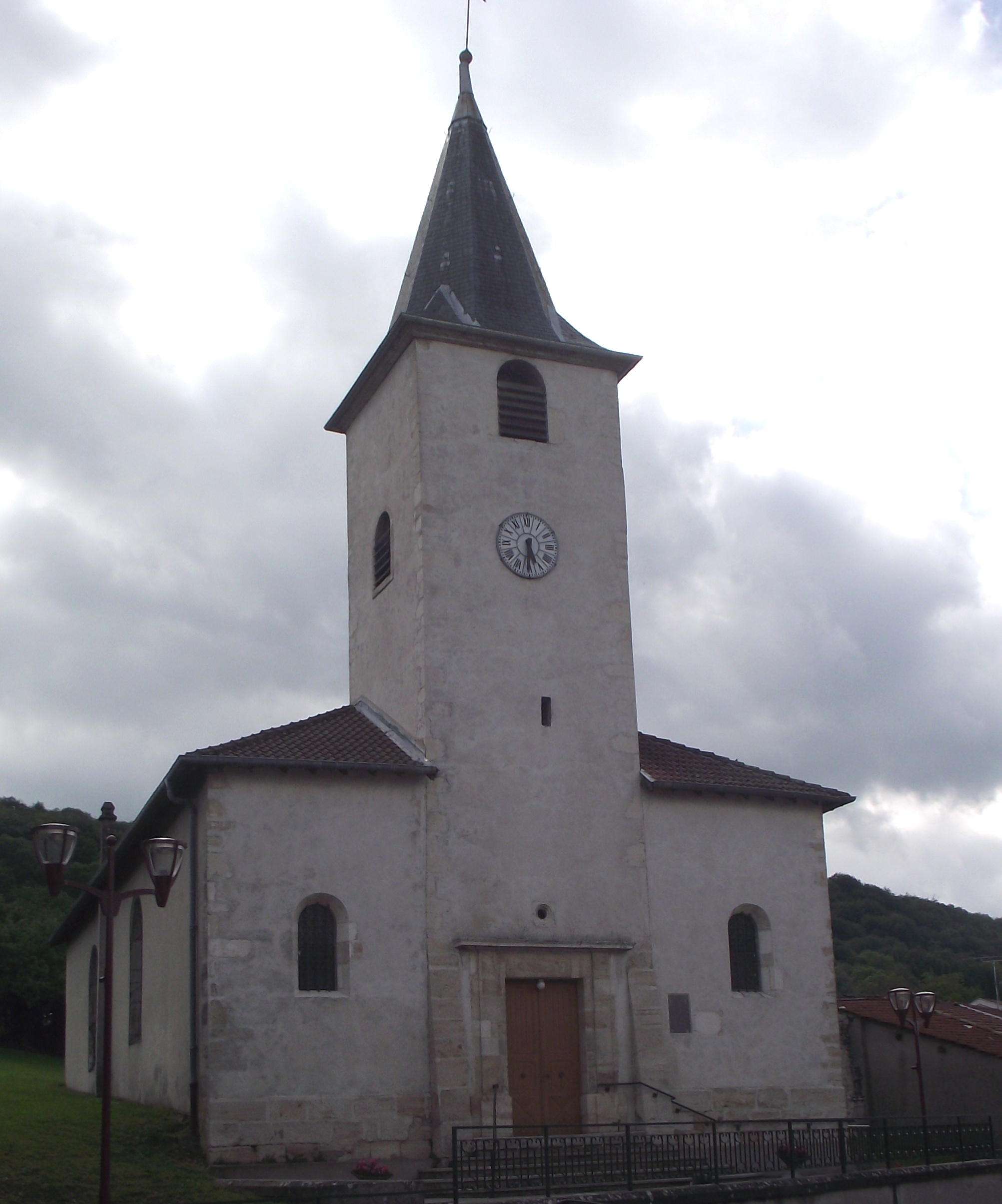
- The church in Mont-le-Vignoble

- Coat of arms
- Location of Mont-le-Vignoble
- Location within France Location within Grand Est
- Coordinates: 48°36′50″N 5°50′28″E
- Country: France
- Region: Grand Est
- Department: Meurthe-et-Moselle
- Arrondissement: Toul
- Canton: Meine au Saintois
- Intercommunality: CC Pays de Colombey et Sud Toulois

Government
  - Mayor (2020–2026): Jean-Pierre Callais
- Area^{1}: 4.12 km^{2} (1.59 sq mi)
- Elevation: 120 m (390 ft)
- Highest elevation: 395 m (1,296 ft)
- Lowest elevation: 223 m (732 ft)
- Population (2023): 421
  - Density: 102/km^{2} (265/sq mi)
- Time zone: UTC+01:00 (CET)
  - Summer (DST): UTC+02:00 (CEST)
- INSEE/Postal code: 54380 /54113
- ^{1} French Land Register data, which excludes lakes, ponds, glaciers > 1 km^{2} (0.386 sq mi or 247 acres) and river estuaries.

Mont-le-Vignoble (French pronunciation: [mɔ̃ lə viɲɔbl]) is a commune in the Meurthe-et-Moselle department in north-eastern France.

== See also ==
- Communes of the Meurthe-et-Moselle department
