= Charmes-la-Côte =

- Commune
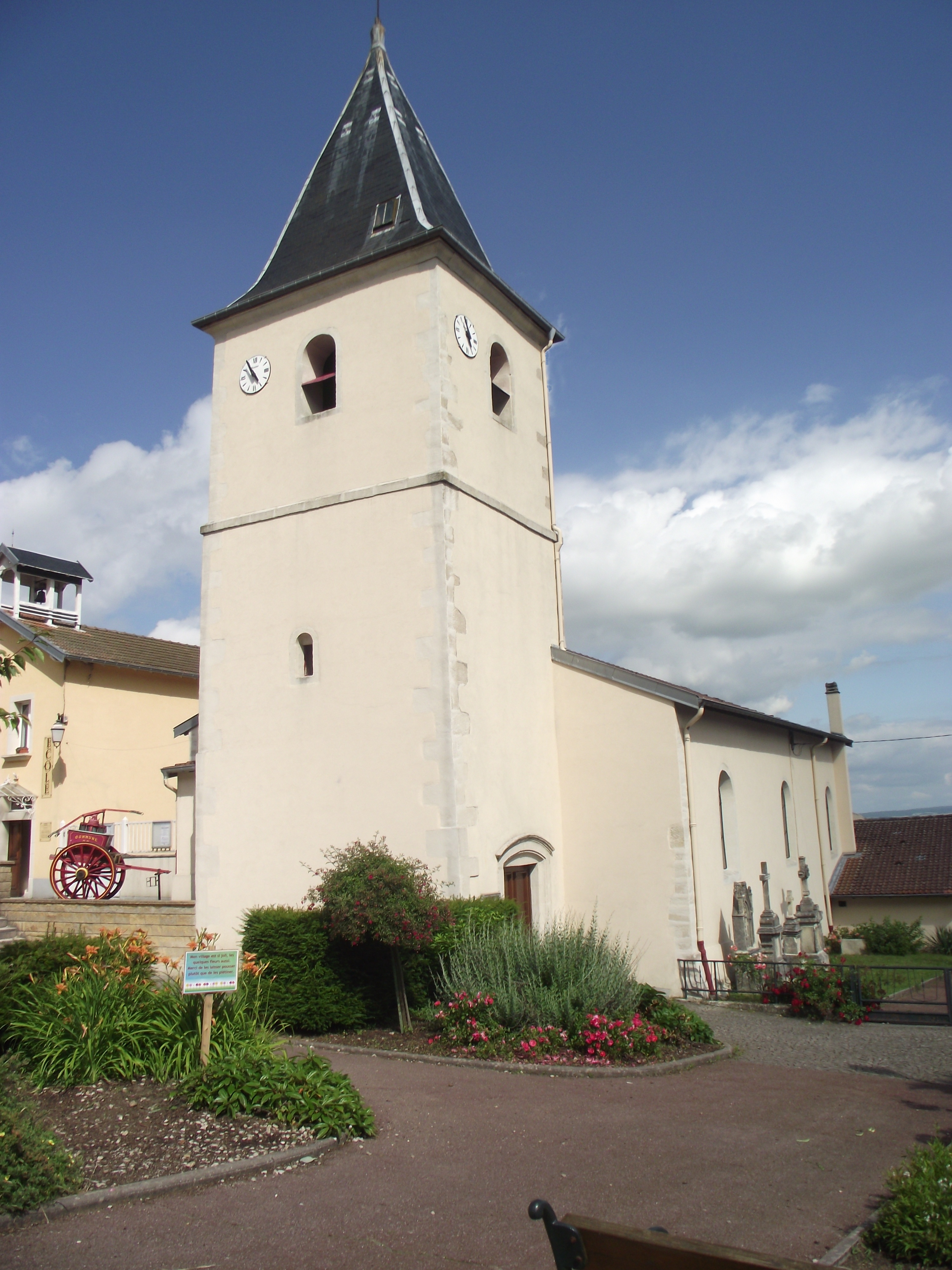
- The church in Charmes-la-Côte

- Coat of arms
- Location of Charmes-la-Côte
- Location within France Location within Grand Est
- Coordinates: 48°37′35″N 5°49′42″E
- Country: France
- Region: Grand Est
- Department: Meurthe-et-Moselle
- Arrondissement: Toul
- Canton: Toul
- Intercommunality: Terres Touloises

Government
  - Mayor (2020–2026): Jean-Luc Starosse
- Area^{1}: 6.23 km^{2} (2.41 sq mi)
- Elevation: 360 m (1,180 ft)
- Highest elevation: 409 m (1,342 ft)
- Lowest elevation: 224 m (735 ft)
- Population (2023): 315
  - Density: 50.6/km^{2} (131/sq mi)
- Demonym: Carpinien(ne)s
- Time zone: UTC+01:00 (CET)
  - Summer (DST): UTC+02:00 (CEST)
- INSEE/Postal code: 54120 /54113
- ^{1} French Land Register data, which excludes lakes, ponds, glaciers > 1 km^{2} (0.386 sq mi or 247 acres) and river estuaries.

Charmes-la-Côte (French pronunciation: [ʃaʁm la kot]) is a commune of Meurthe-et-Moselle department in northeastern France.

== See also ==
- Communes of the Meurthe-et-Moselle department
