= Domgermain =

- Commune
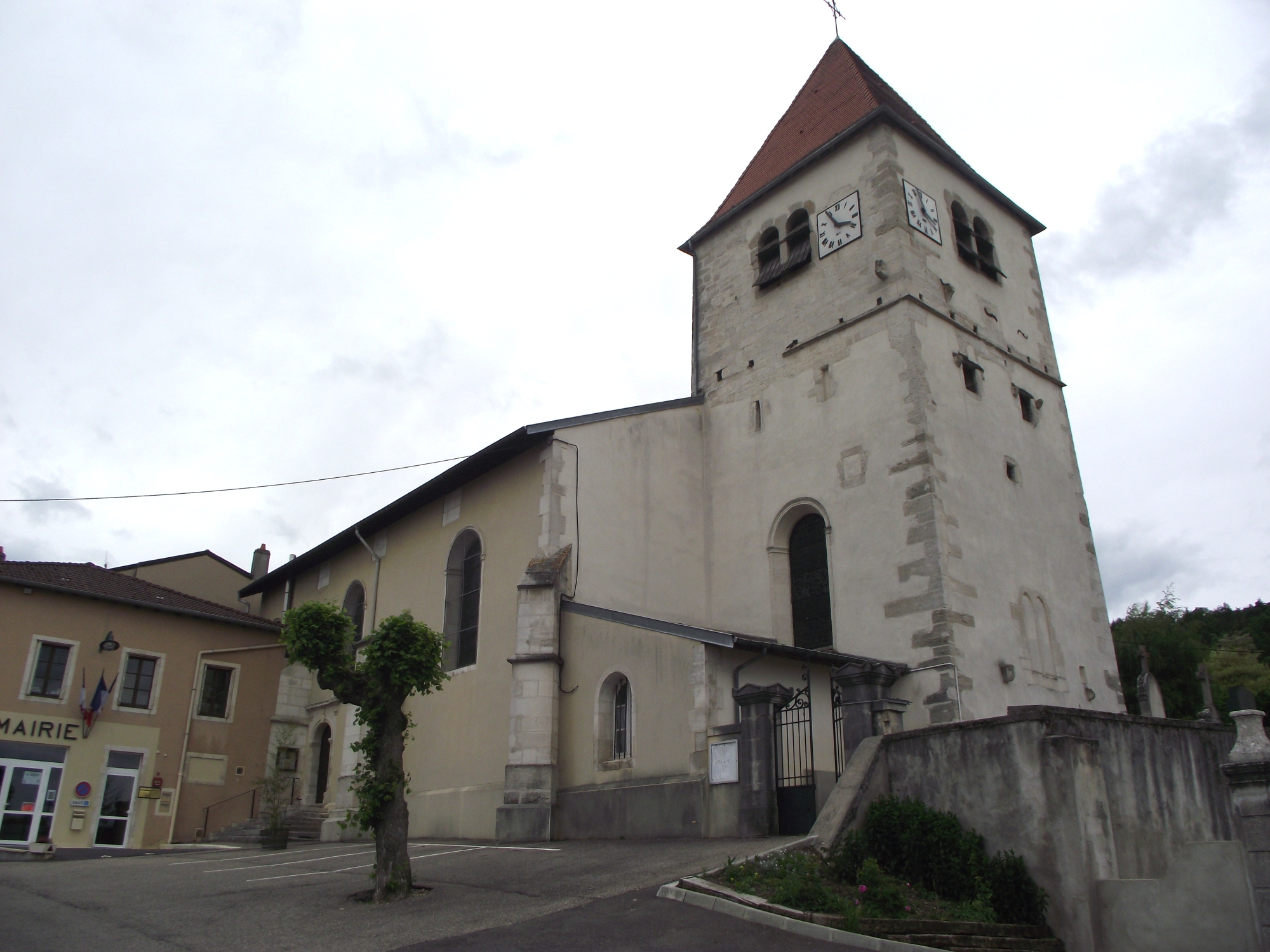
- The church in Domgermain

- Coat of arms
- Location of Domgermain
- Location within France Location within Grand Est
- Coordinates: 48°38′36″N 5°49′36″E
- Country: France
- Region: Grand Est
- Department: Meurthe-et-Moselle
- Arrondissement: Toul
- Canton: Toul
- Intercommunality: Terres Touloises

Government
  - Mayor (2022–2026): Géraldine Debonnet
- Area^{1}: 13.09 km^{2} (5.05 sq mi)
- Elevation: 337 m (1,106 ft)
- Highest elevation: 414 m (1,358 ft)
- Lowest elevation: 219 m (719 ft)
- Population (2023): 1,120
  - Density: 85.6/km^{2} (222/sq mi)
- Time zone: UTC+01:00 (CET)
  - Summer (DST): UTC+02:00 (CEST)
- INSEE/Postal code: 54162 /54119
- ^{1} French Land Register data, which excludes lakes, ponds, glaciers > 1 km^{2} (0.386 sq mi or 247 acres) and river estuaries.

Domgermain (French pronunciation: [dɔ̃ʒɛʁmɛ̃]) is a commune in the Meurthe-et-Moselle department in north-eastern France.

== See also ==
- Communes of the Meurthe-et-Moselle department
