= Toul =

Subprefecture and commune in Grand Est, France

- Subprefecture and commune
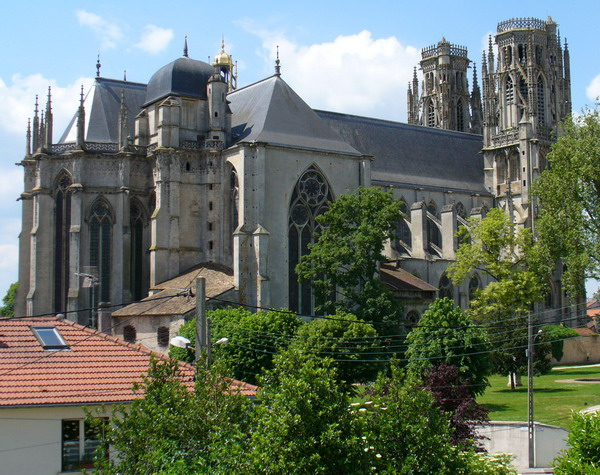
- Toul Cathedral

- Flag Coat of arms
- Location of Toul
- Location within France Location within Grand Est
- Coordinates: 48°40′30″N 5°53′30″E
- Country: France
- Region: Grand Est
- Department: Meurthe-et-Moselle
- Arrondissement: Toul
- Canton: Toul
- Intercommunality: Terres Touloises

Government
  - Mayor (2020–2026): Alde Harmand
- Area^{1}: 30.59 km^{2} (11.81 sq mi)
- Highest elevation: 400 m (1,300 ft)
- Lowest elevation: 200 m (660 ft)
- Population (2023): 15,768
  - Density: 515.5/km^{2} (1,335/sq mi)
- Time zone: UTC+01:00 (CET)
  - Summer (DST): UTC+02:00 (CEST)
- INSEE/Postal code: 54528 /54200
- ^{1} French Land Register data, which excludes lakes, ponds, glaciers > 1 km^{2} (0.386 sq mi or 247 acres) and river estuaries.

Toul (French pronunciation: [tul]) is a commune in the Meurthe-et-Moselle department in north-eastern France.

It is a sub-prefecture of the department.

== Geography ==
Toul is between Commercy and Nancy, and the river Moselle and Canal de la Marne au Rhin.

=== Climate ===
Toul has an oceanic climate (Köppen climate classification Cfb). The average annual temperature in Toul is 9.8 °C (49.6 °F). The average annual rainfall is 761.1 mm (29.96 in) with June as the wettest month. The temperatures are highest on average in July, at around 18.6 °C (65.5 °F), and lowest in January, at around 1.3 °C (34.3 °F). The highest temperature ever recorded in Toul was 37.9 °C (100.2 °F) on 11 August 1998; the coldest temperature ever recorded was −17.8 °C (0.0 °F) on 9 January 1985.

Climate data for Toul (1981−2010 normals, extremes 1968−1998)
| Month | Jan | Feb | Mar | Apr | May | Jun | Jul | Aug | Sep | Oct | Nov | Dec | Year |
|---|---|---|---|---|---|---|---|---|---|---|---|---|---|
| Record high °C (°F) | 15.2 (59.4) | 20.2 (68.4) | 24.3 (75.7) | 27.2 (81.0) | 29.4 (84.9) | 33.4 (92.1) | 36.8 (98.2) | 37.9 (100.2) | 30.9 (87.6) | 26.5 (79.7) | 19.4 (66.9) | 17.2 (63.0) | 37.9 (100.2) |
| Mean daily maximum °C (°F) | 3.8 (38.8) | 5.4 (41.7) | 10.2 (50.4) | 13.6 (56.5) | 18.2 (64.8) | 21.1 (70.0) | 24.4 (75.9) | 24.2 (75.6) | 19.5 (67.1) | 14.2 (57.6) | 7.9 (46.2) | 4.9 (40.8) | 14.0 (57.2) |
| Daily mean °C (°F) | 1.3 (34.3) | 2.0 (35.6) | 6.1 (43.0) | 8.8 (47.8) | 13.1 (55.6) | 16.1 (61.0) | 18.8 (65.8) | 18.6 (65.5) | 14.7 (58.5) | 10.4 (50.7) | 5.1 (41.2) | 2.6 (36.7) | 9.8 (49.6) |
| Mean daily minimum °C (°F) | −1.2 (29.8) | −1.3 (29.7) | 1.9 (35.4) | 3.9 (39.0) | 8.0 (46.4) | 11.1 (52.0) | 13.2 (55.8) | 12.9 (55.2) | 9.8 (49.6) | 6.6 (43.9) | 2.3 (36.1) | 0.2 (32.4) | 5.7 (42.3) |
| Record low °C (°F) | −17.8 (0.0) | −16.3 (2.7) | −14.6 (5.7) | −5.6 (21.9) | −2.1 (28.2) | 0.2 (32.4) | 4.3 (39.7) | 3.8 (38.8) | 0.3 (32.5) | −4.9 (23.2) | −10.9 (12.4) | −17.6 (0.3) | −17.8 (0.0) |
| Average precipitation mm (inches) | 63.2 (2.49) | 51.2 (2.02) | 55.5 (2.19) | 52.1 (2.05) | 73.2 (2.88) | 77.2 (3.04) | 58.9 (2.32) | 54.4 (2.14) | 65.2 (2.57) | 73.7 (2.90) | 62.7 (2.47) | 73.8 (2.91) | 761.1 (29.96) |
| Average precipitation days (≥ 1.0 mm) | 12.1 | 10.2 | 11.6 | 10.1 | 11.7 | 11.5 | 8.6 | 7.7 | 8.8 | 11.7 | 10.7 | 11.5 | 126.2 |
| Average snowy days | 7.4 | 7.3 | 4.6 | 1.6 | 0.1 | 0 | 0 | 0 | 0 | 0 | 2.4 | 4.4 | 27.7 |
Source: Météo-France

== History ==
Toul was known to the Romans as Tullum Leucorum, and was the capital of the Gaulish tribe of the Leuci.

In 550, King Theudebald convoked a synod at Toul. In 612, King Theudebert II of Austrasia was defeated by King Theuderic II of Burgundy near Toul. By the Treaty of Meerssen of 870, Toul became part of East Francia, the later Holy Roman Empire. During the High Middle Ages, it became a Free Imperial City. Toul was annexed to France by King Henry II in 1552; this was recognized by the Holy Roman Empire in the Peace of Westphalia of 1648. It then was a part of the French province of the Three Bishoprics.

Toul was the seat of the bishops of Toul; the diocese was founded around 365 and existed until 1807.

During the siege of 1870 during the Franco-Prussian War, the last time that Toul's defenses were used as a classic fortress, 64 guns opened fire at 6:00 a.m. on 23 September, and the fortress surrendered at 3:00 p.m. after 2,433 shells had been fired.

The city was also the primary base of the Air Service, United States Army, a predecessor organization of the United States Air Force during World War I. As such, it was a base for many of the 45 wartime squadrons of the First Army Air Service, including the squadrons of the 1st Pursuit Group, First Army Observation Group and others. The Americans referred to the area around Toul as the Toul Sector. Two large operations were launched from this area: the St. Mihiel Offensive and the Meuse-Argonne Offensive, both in September 1918. During World War II, the American 358th Fighter Group used Toul-Croix De Metz Airfield (A-90) during the fall of 1944 and spring of 1945, and Toul-Rosières Air Base (BA 136) was an American NATO air base during the 1950s and 1960s.

== Population ==
Historical population

| Year | Pop. | ±% p.a. |
|---|---|---|
| 1793 | 8,015 | — |
| 1800 | 6,940 | −2.04% |
| 1806 | 6,973 | +0.08% |
| 1821 | 7,535 | +0.52% |
| 1831 | 7,507 | −0.04% |
| 1836 | 7,333 | −0.47% |
| 1841 | 7,037 | −0.82% |
| 1846 | 7,158 | +0.34% |
| 1851 | 7,271 | +0.31% |
| 1856 | 8,191 | +2.41% |
| 1861 | 7,687 | −1.26% |
| 1872 | 6,930 | −0.94% |
| 1876 | 10,085 | +9.83% |
| 1881 | 10,012 | −0.15% |
| 1886 | 10,459 | +0.88% |
| 1891 | 12,138 | +3.02% |
| 1896 | 12,201 | +0.10% |
| 1901 | 12,287 | +0.14% |

| Year | Pop. | ±% p.a. |
|---|---|---|
| 1906 | 13,663 | +2.15% |
| 1911 | 15,884 | +3.06% |
| 1921 | 12,363 | −2.47% |
| 1926 | 11,951 | −0.68% |
| 1931 | 12,656 | +1.15% |
| 1936 | 13,267 | +0.95% |
| 1946 | 9,389 | −3.40% |
| 1954 | 12,134 | +3.26% |
| 1962 | 14,155 | +1.94% |
| 1968 | 14,780 | +0.72% |
| 1975 | 16,454 | +1.54% |
| 1982 | 17,406 | +0.81% |
| 1990 | 17,281 | −0.09% |
| 1999 | 16,945 | −0.22% |
| 2007 | 16,230 | −0.54% |
| 2012 | 16,271 | +0.05% |
| 2017 | 15,832 | −0.55% |
| 2023 | 15,768 | −0.07% |

Source: EHESS and INSEE (1968-2023)

== Sights ==
The most striking features are the impressive stone ramparts. Those that exist today are the work of Sébastien Le Prestre de Vauban, Louis XIV's military engineer. In 1698 he designed a new enclosure and work began in 1699-1700. Several of Vauban's fortifications in France are listed as a combined UNESCO World Heritage Site. Although the fortifications at Toul are not in that list they do follow the general defiladed fortification pattern for which Vauban is known. There appears to have been a fortified town at this location since the earliest recorded history. Today, the ramparts encircle and define the old town. They are built of dressed white stone, and topped with grass, and in places are over five metres high.

There is a great deal of Roman archaeology in the area and allegedly some in the town. The Roman fortified town of Grand is some 30 km away, with its great amphitheatre and temple to the Cult of Apollo.

The old town's architecture is dominated by past glories in various states of decay, including a major Gothic cathedral, which is in a poor condition and is being slowly restored. Many of the houses were built as canonical residences in the Late Middle Ages and bear vestiges in the form of ornamental stonework. The gothic chapel of the Knights Templar Commandery of Libdeau is undergoing a major restoration.

There is no trace of the monastery, however its wine-cellars still exist, under the shops on the north side of the Rue Gambetta. (Access is possible via the Camera Shop).

== Transportation ==
Toul is at the intersection of the river Moselle (which divides into the river proper and the Moselle Canalisée just outside the town) with the Canal de la Marne au Rhin, and was once, consequently, an important port. The barges known as péniches still navigate these watercourses commercially, typically carrying steel, though in the summer much more of the water traffic is for pleasure.

There is a main-line railway station at Toul, the last major station before the (once vast, and still very large) marshalling yards at Nancy. However, the Paris-Strasbourg TGV line, completed in 2016, passes about 20 km north of Toul, approximately midway between Metz and Nancy.

== Economy ==
The surrounding countryside is a wine-growing region, in which the AOC Côtes de Toul vintage is produced. Particularly notable is the Gris de Toul.

== Administration ==
Toul is the seat and part of the canton of Toul, and of the arrondissement of Toul.

== Twin towns ==
- Jaroměř, Czech Republic, since 1996
- Hamm, Germany, since 1987
- Ostrołęka, Poland, since 2006

== Notable people ==
- Saint Gerard of Toul, bishop
- Antoine Augustin Calmet, monk
- Hobey Baker, American athlete, died in the town
- Marcel Bigeard, French Army General
- Anne-Laure Blin, politician
- Mickaël Causse, Neuroscientist
- Laurent Gouvion Saint-Cyr, military leader
- Rachid Hamdani, footballer
- Louis Majorelle, furniture designer and manufacturer
- Pascal Vigneron, musician and director of the Bach Toul Festival

== Gallery ==
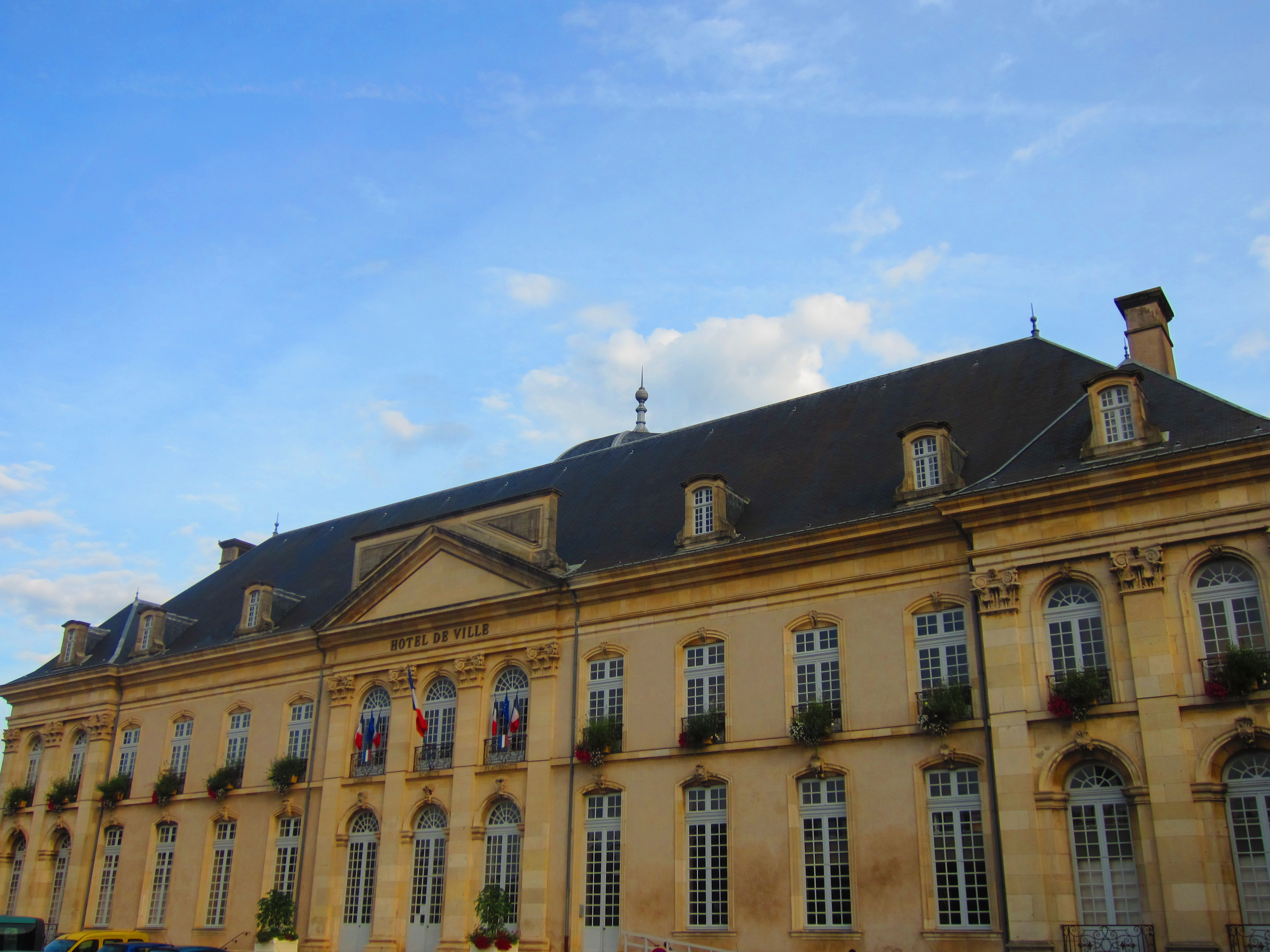

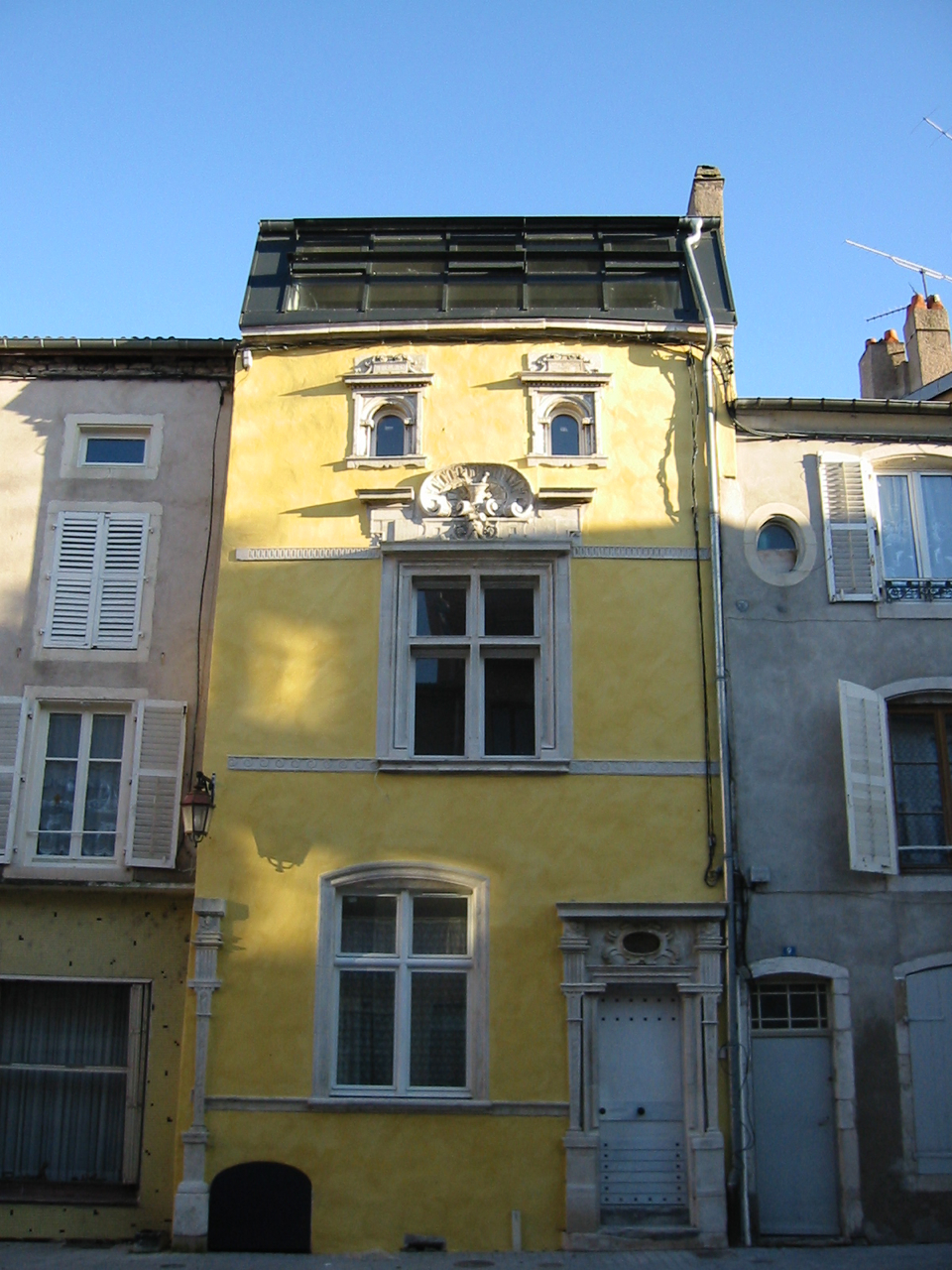

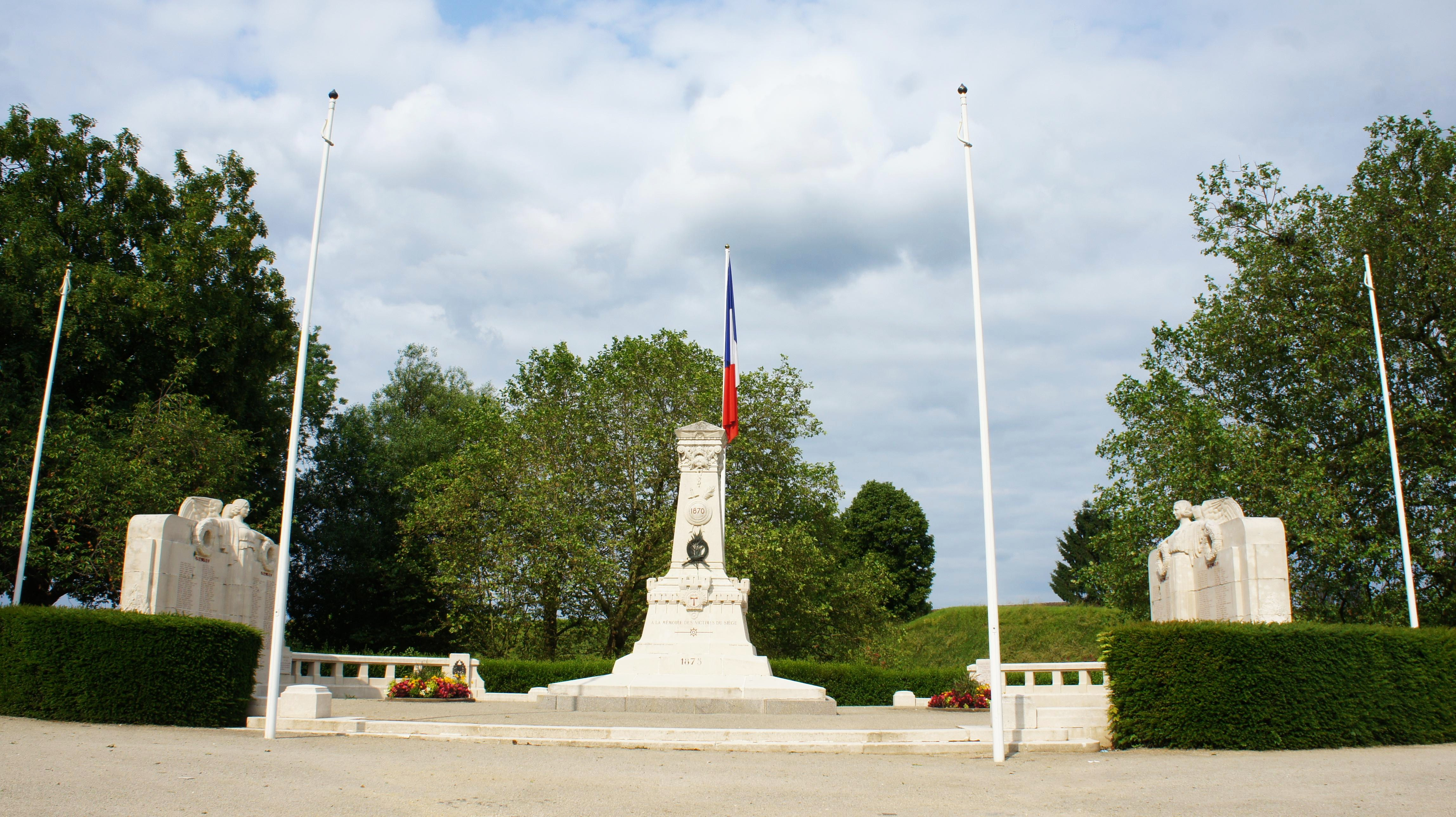

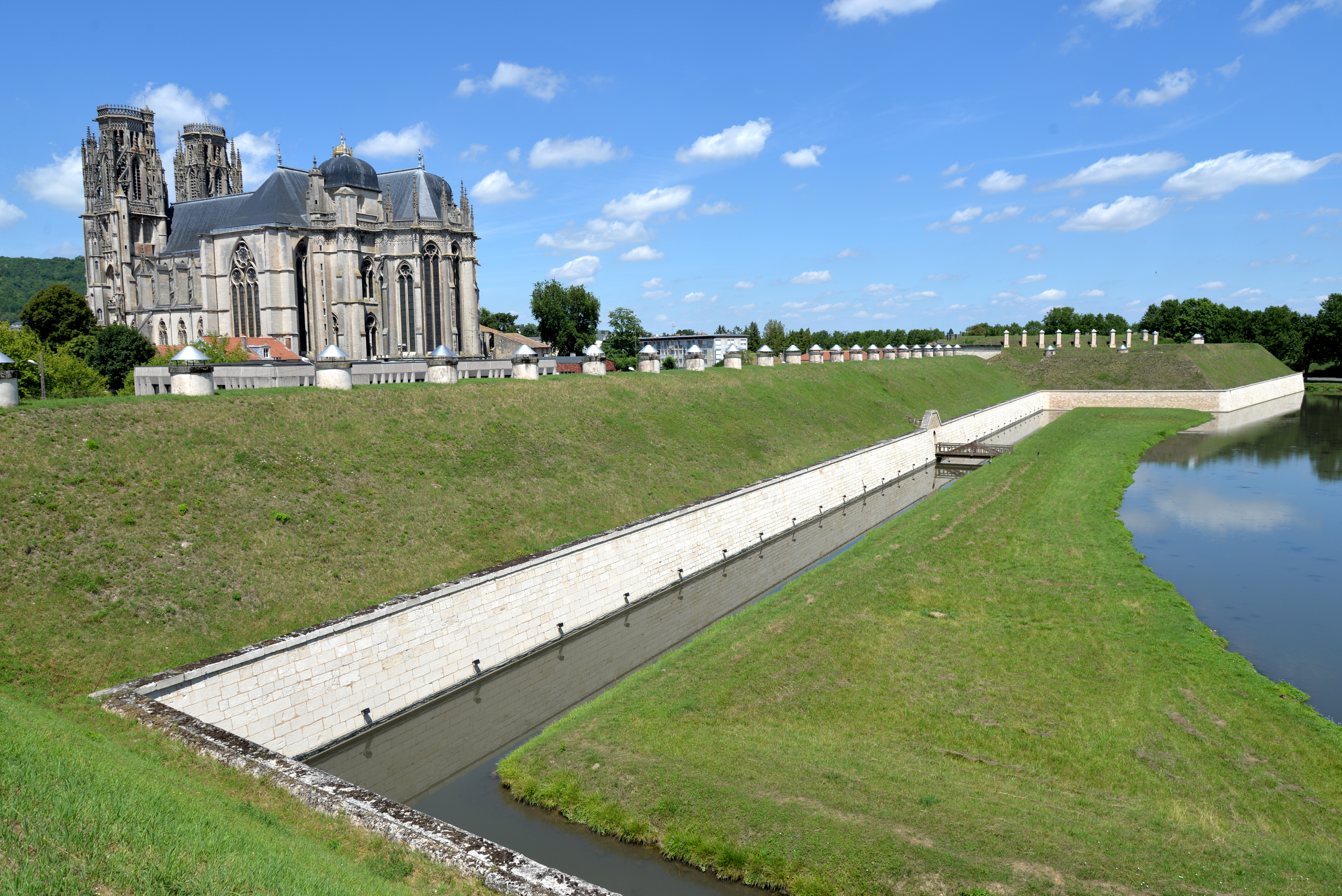

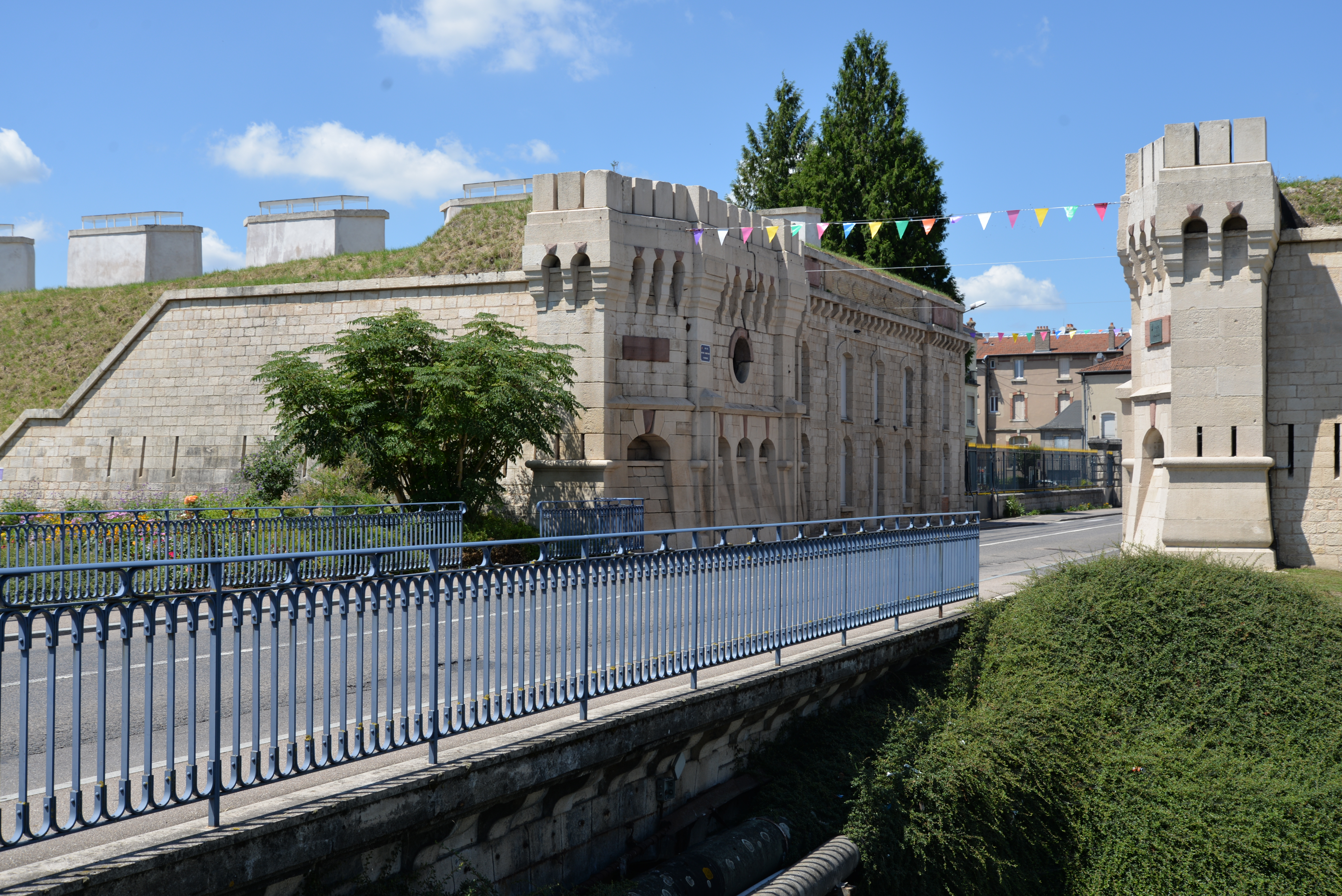

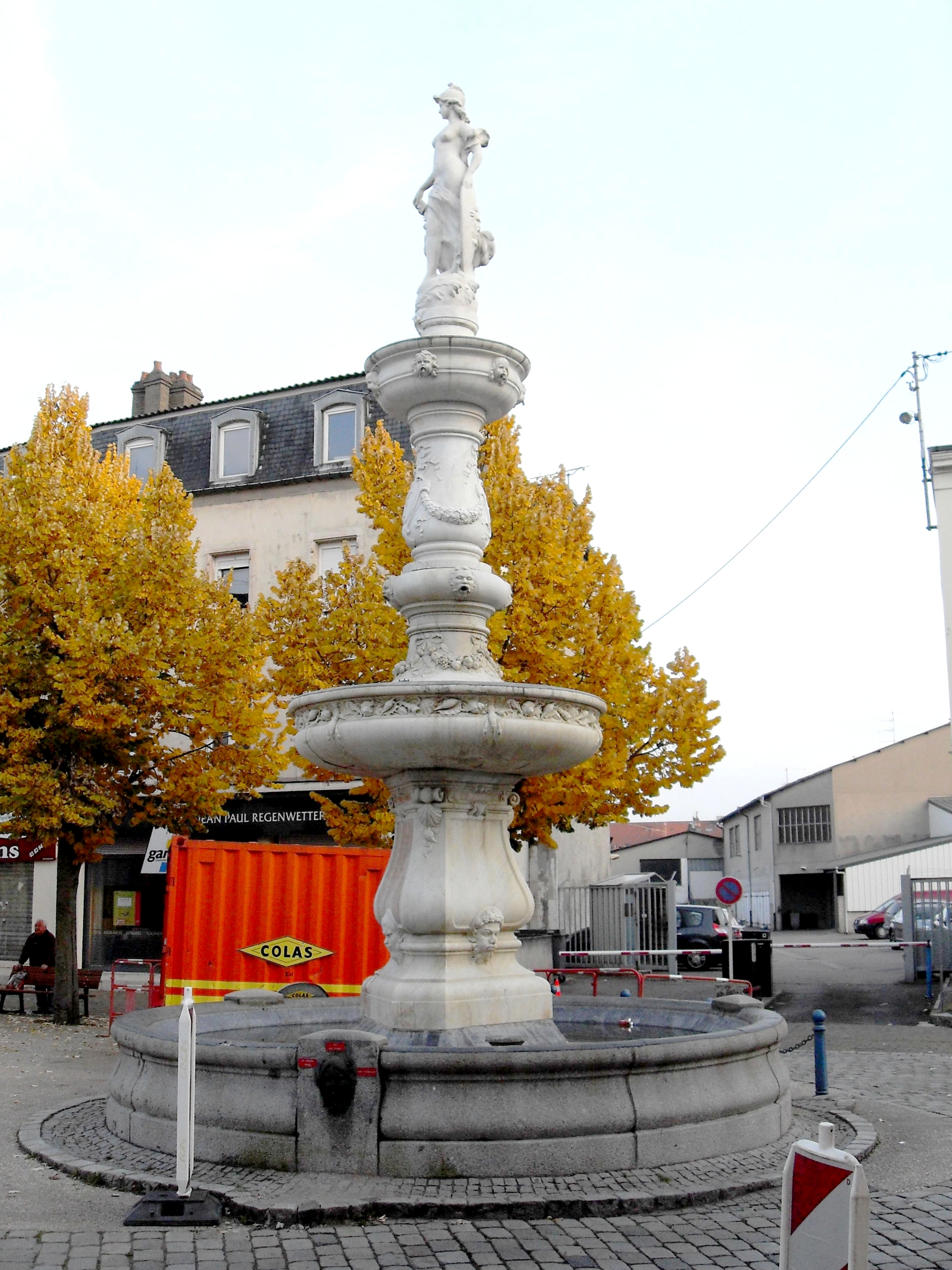

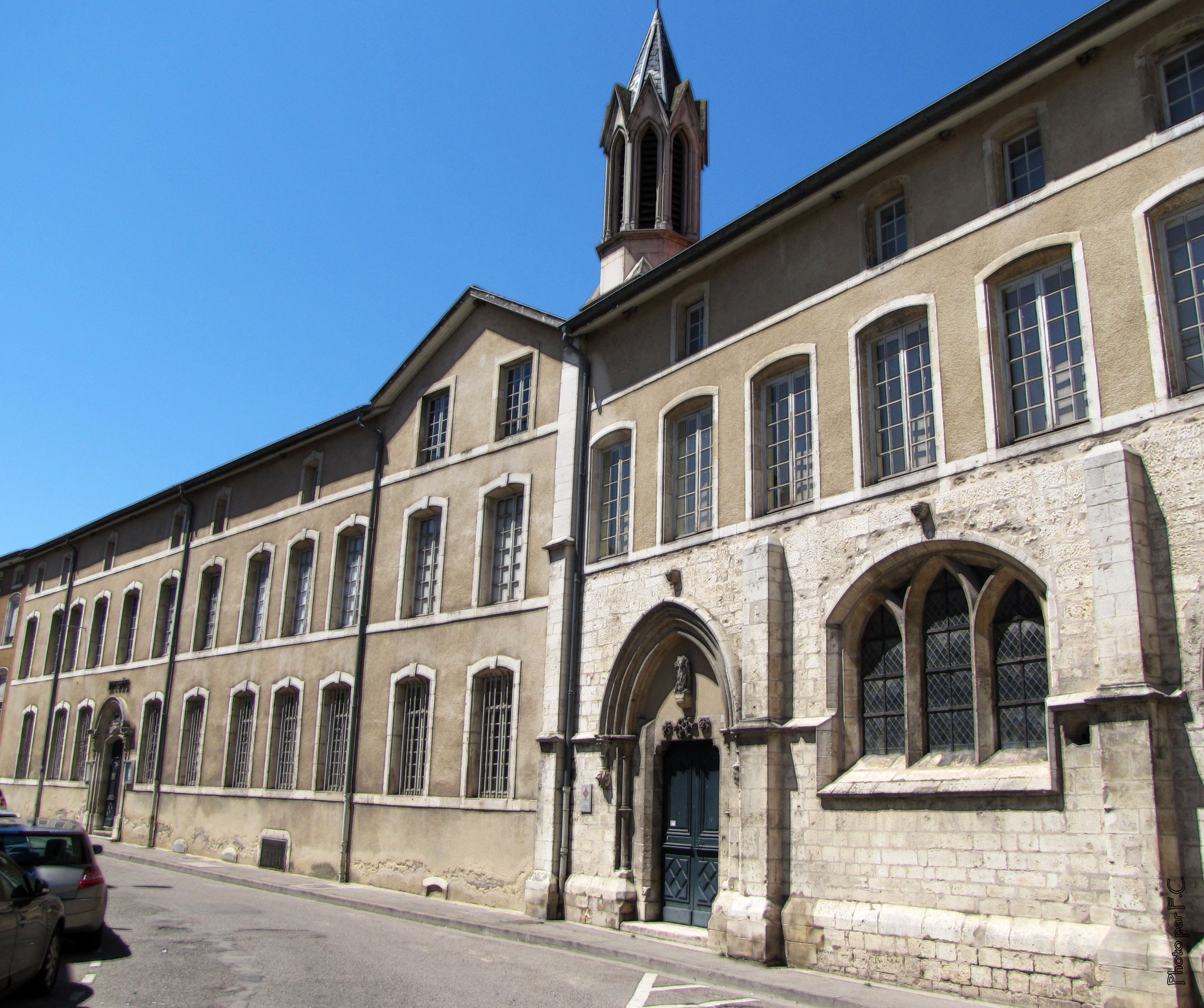
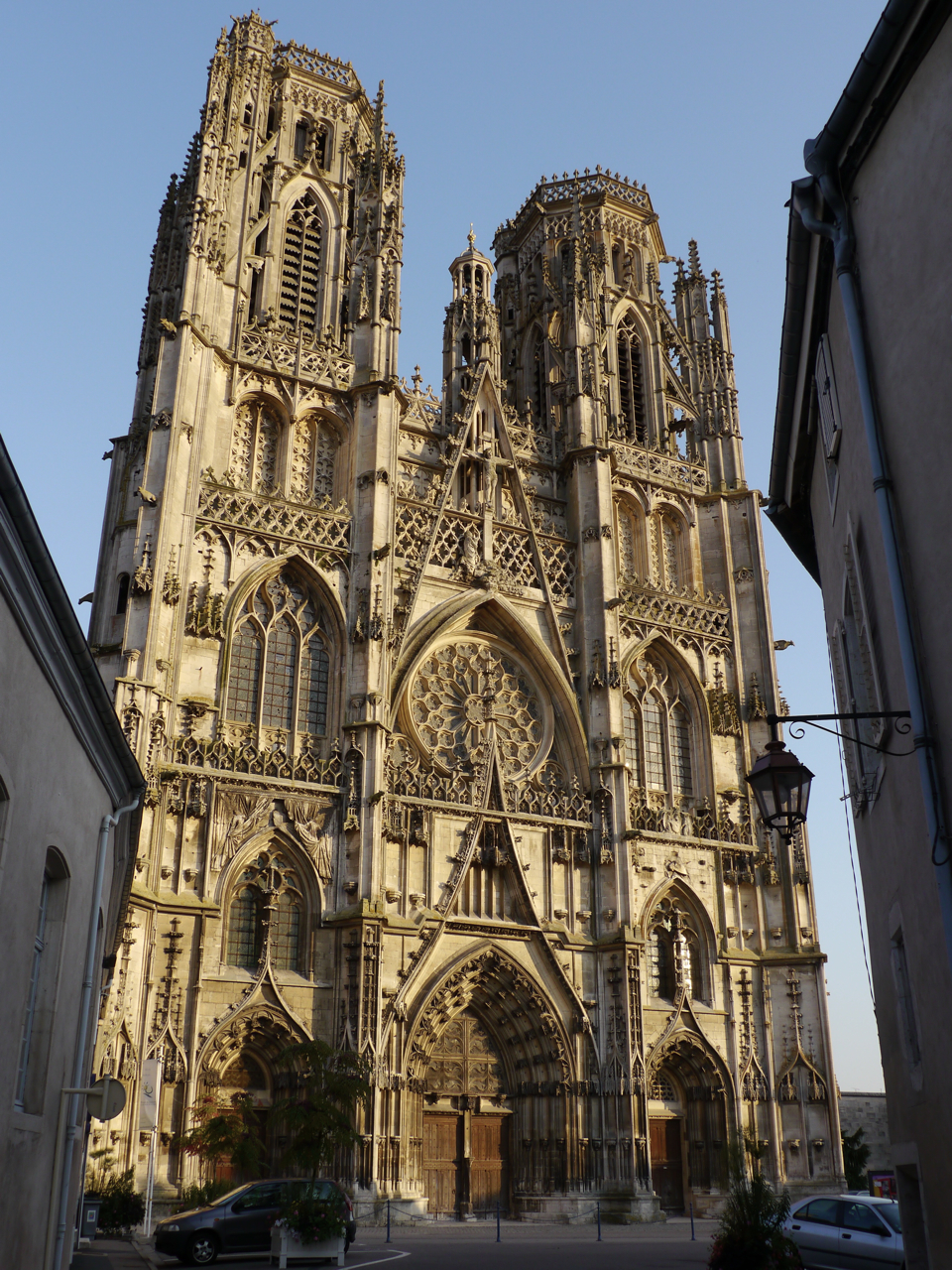
Facade

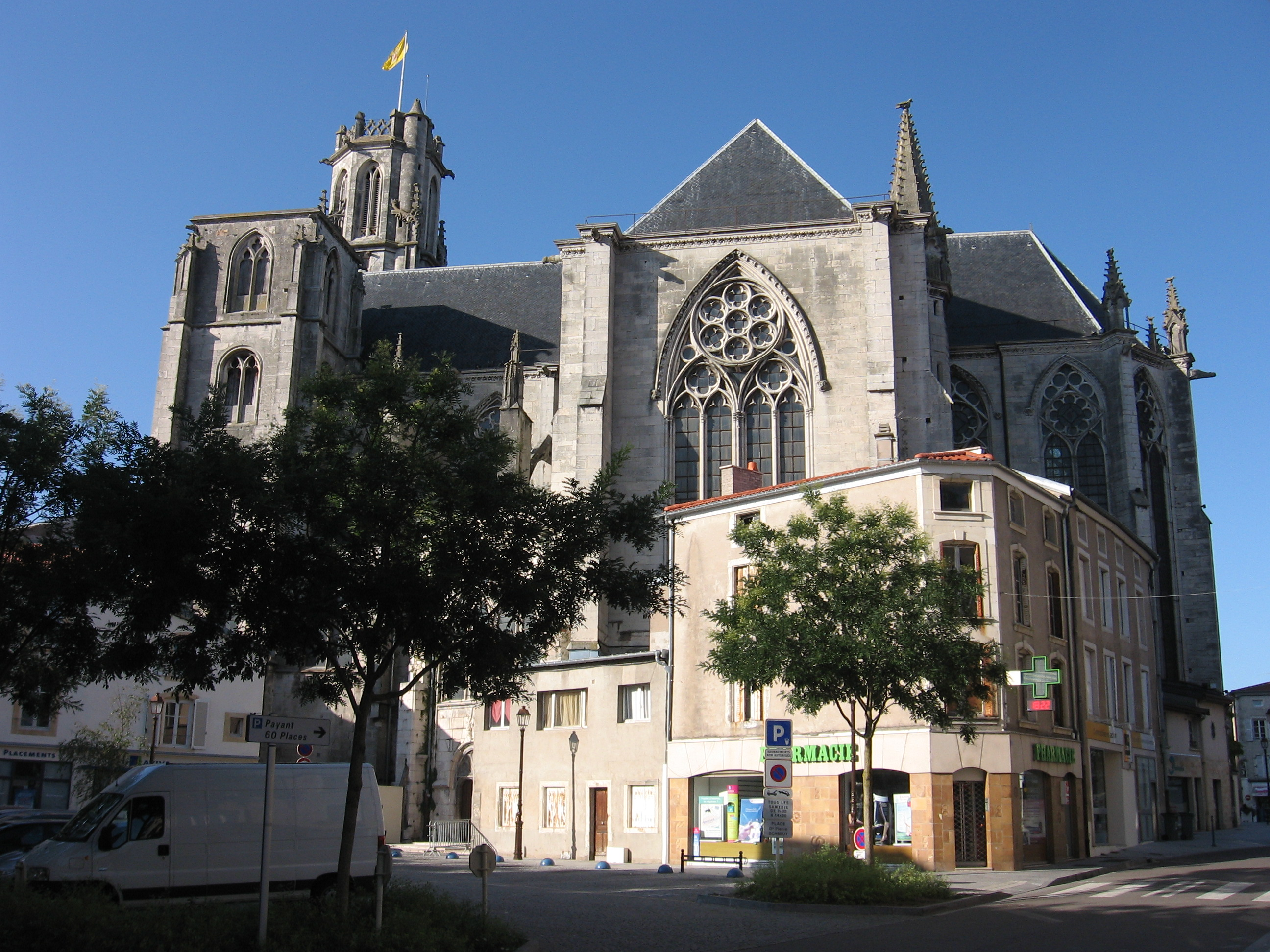

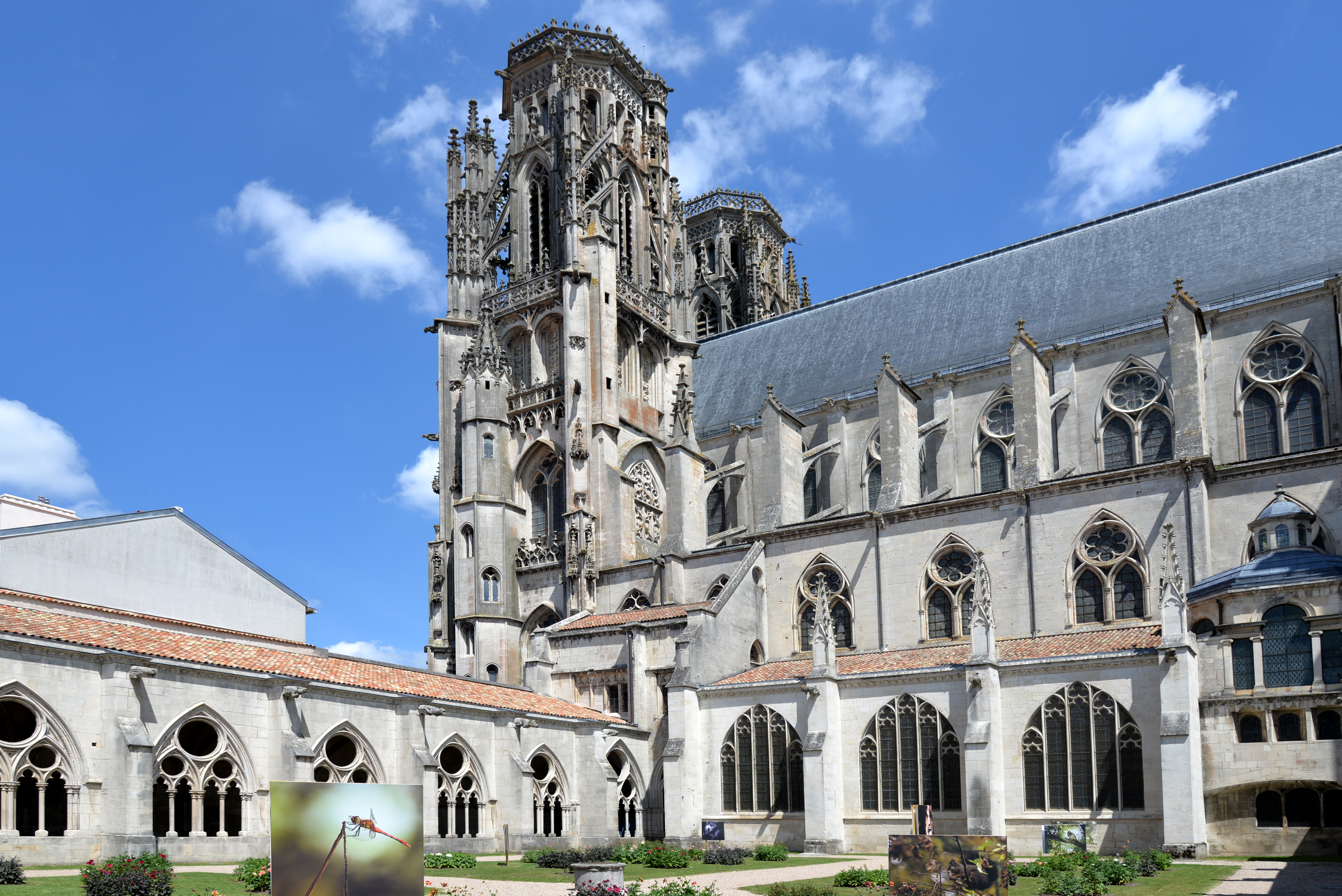

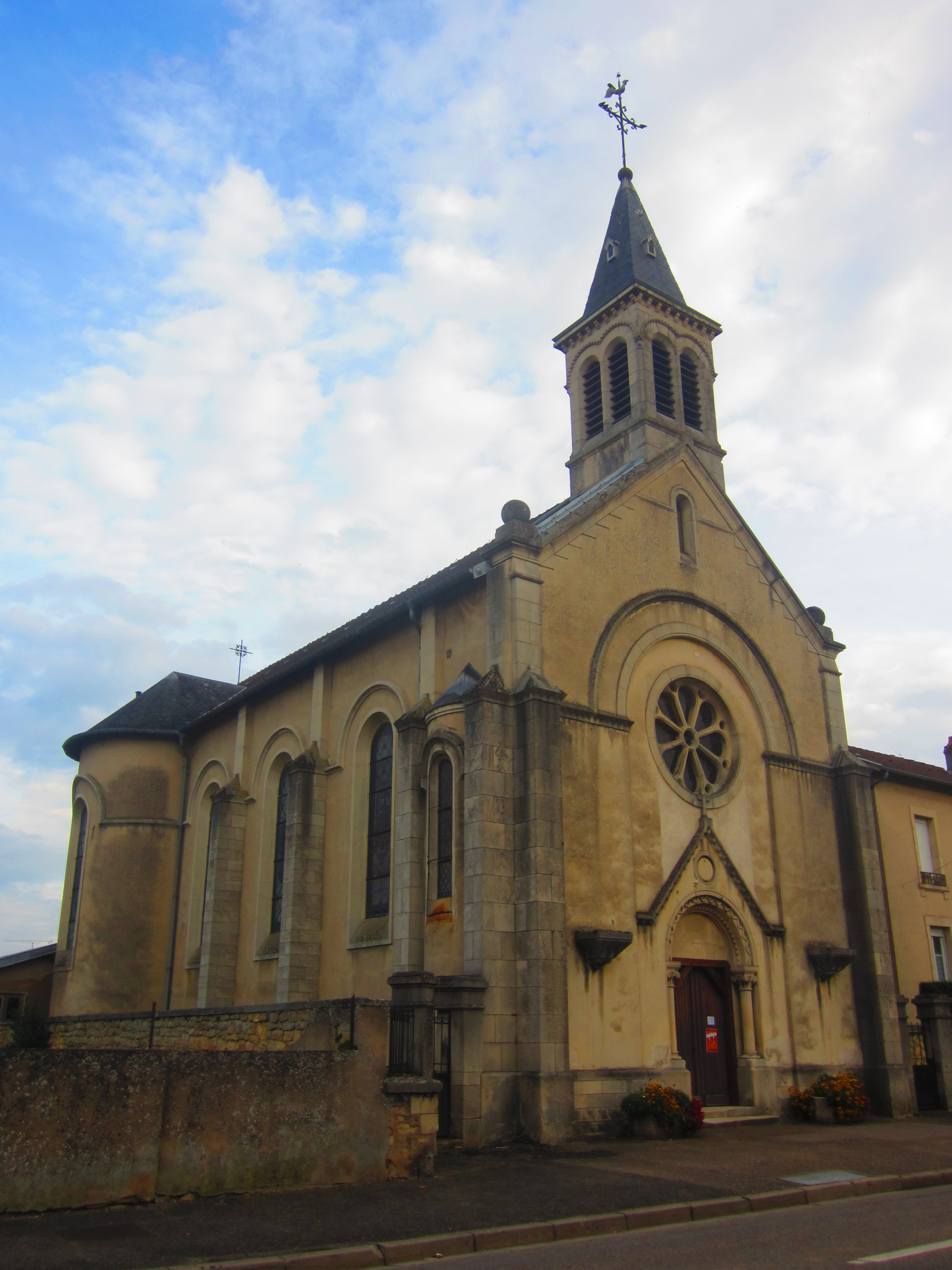

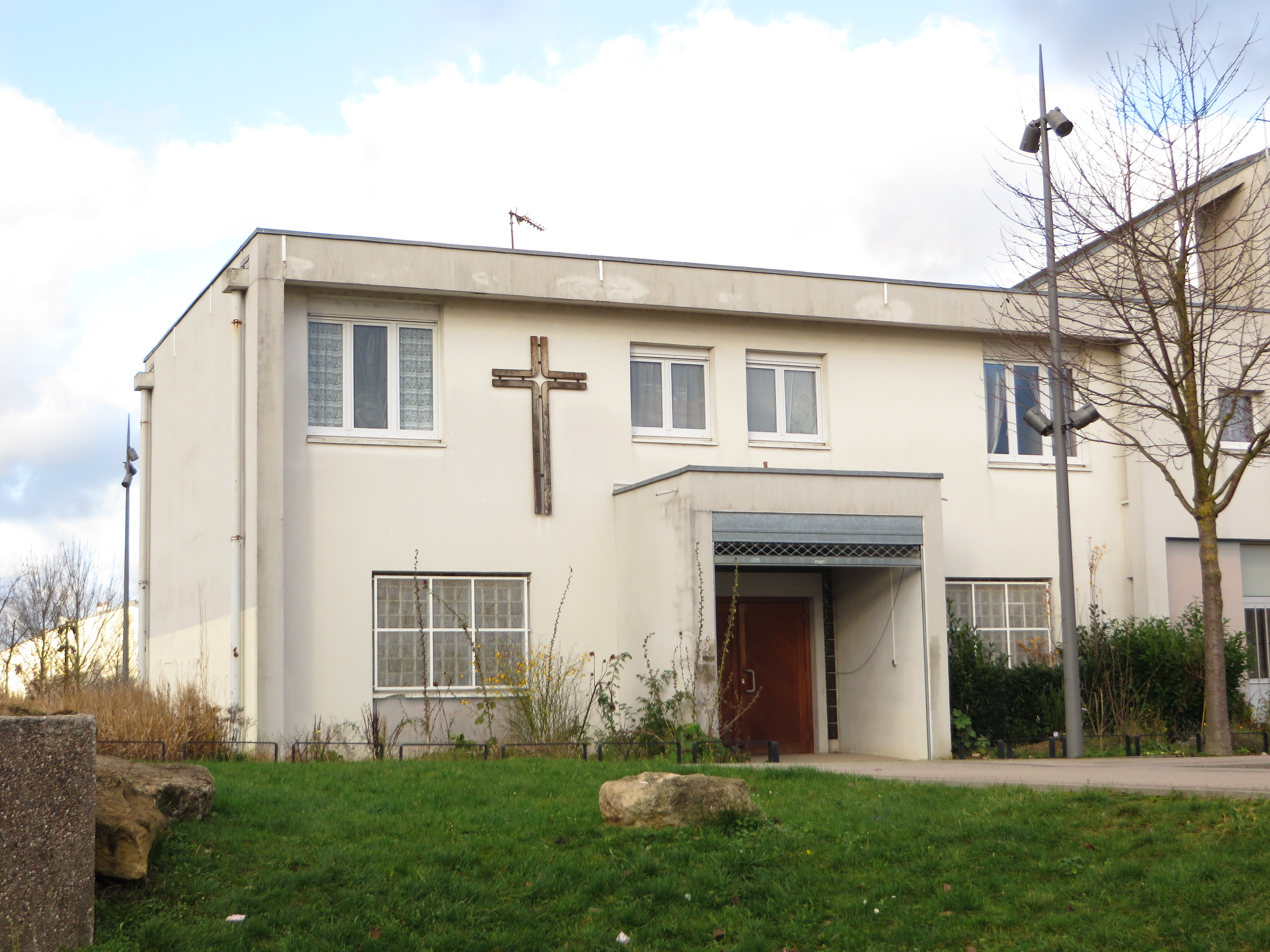

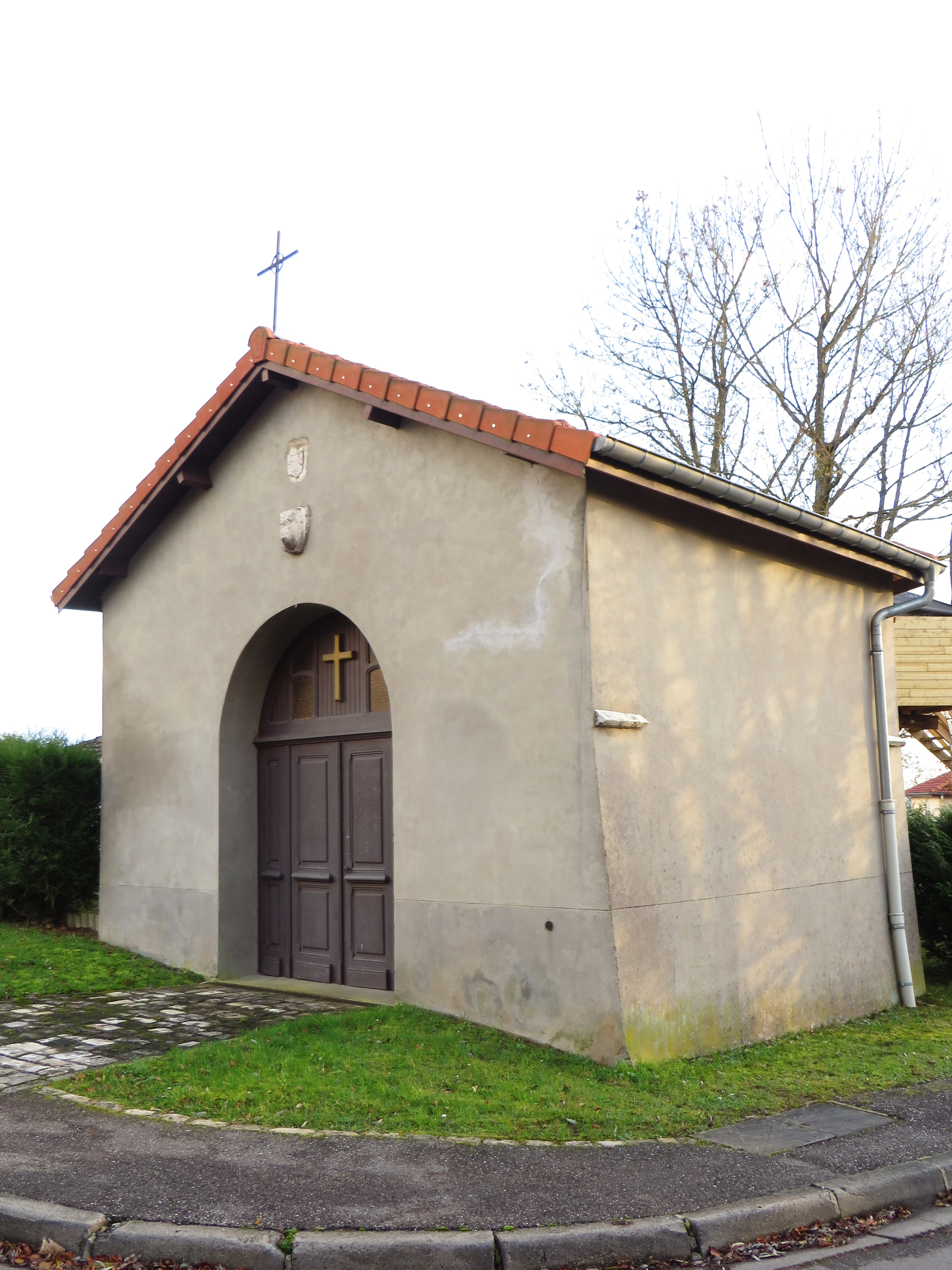

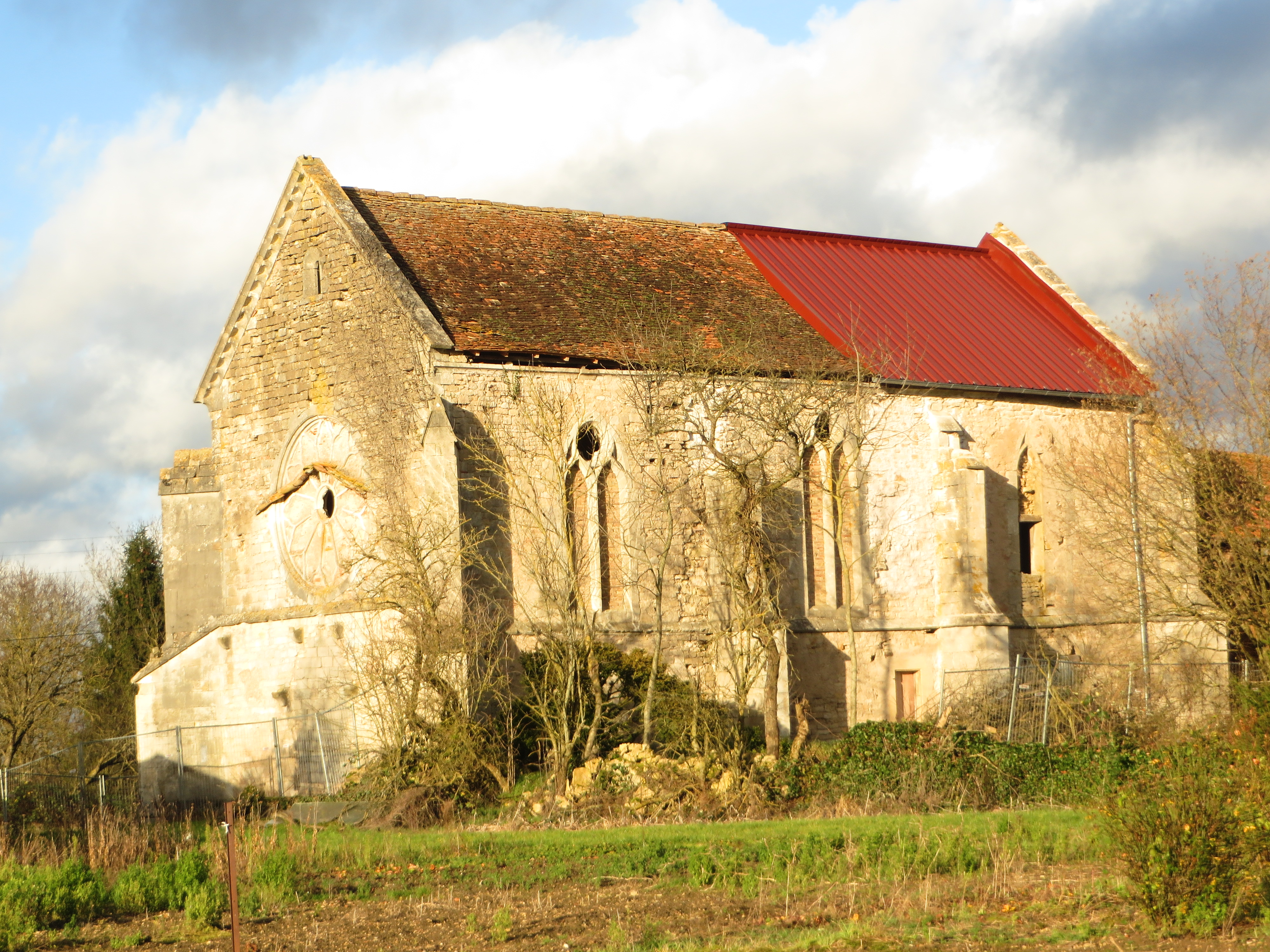

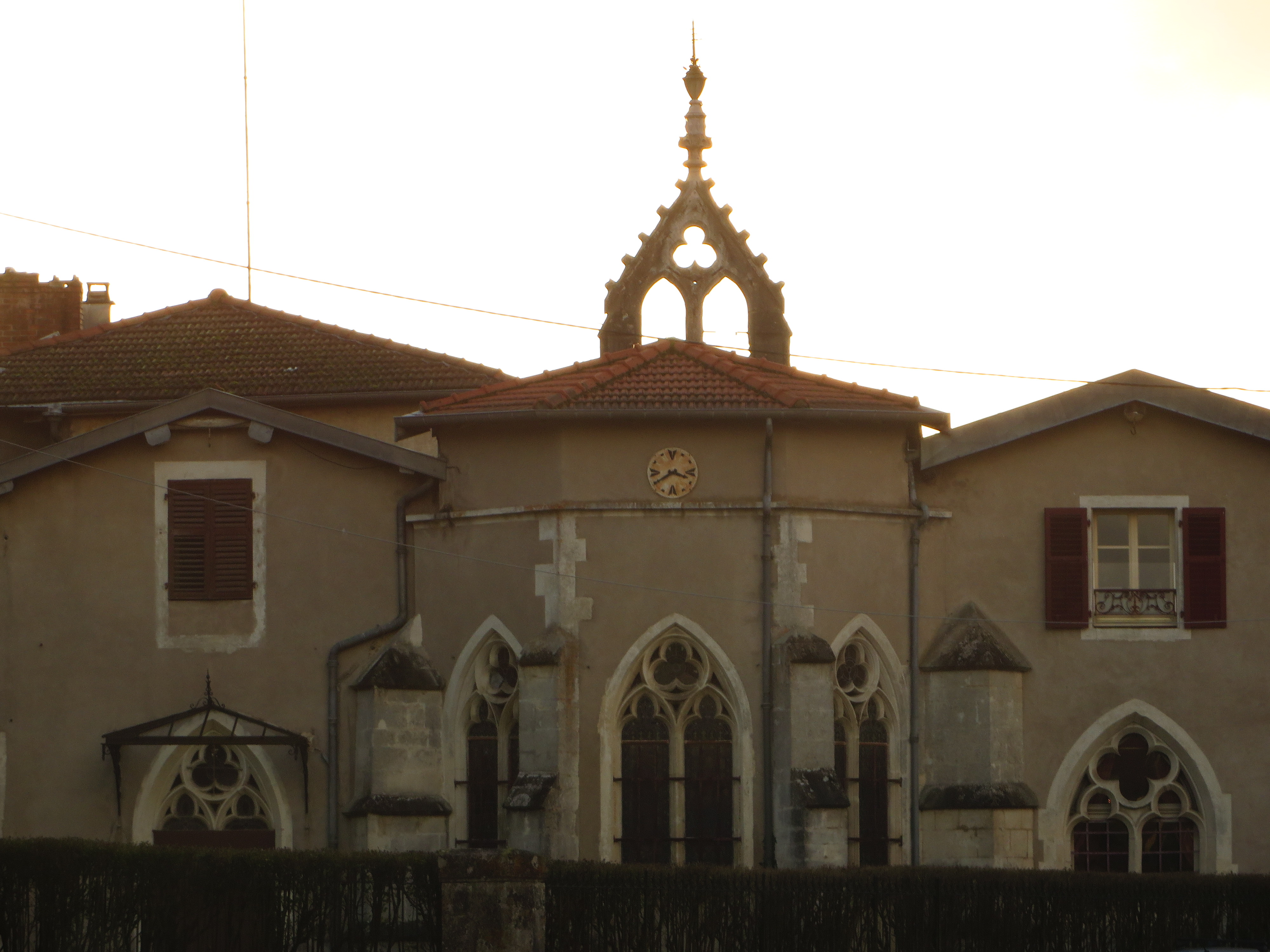

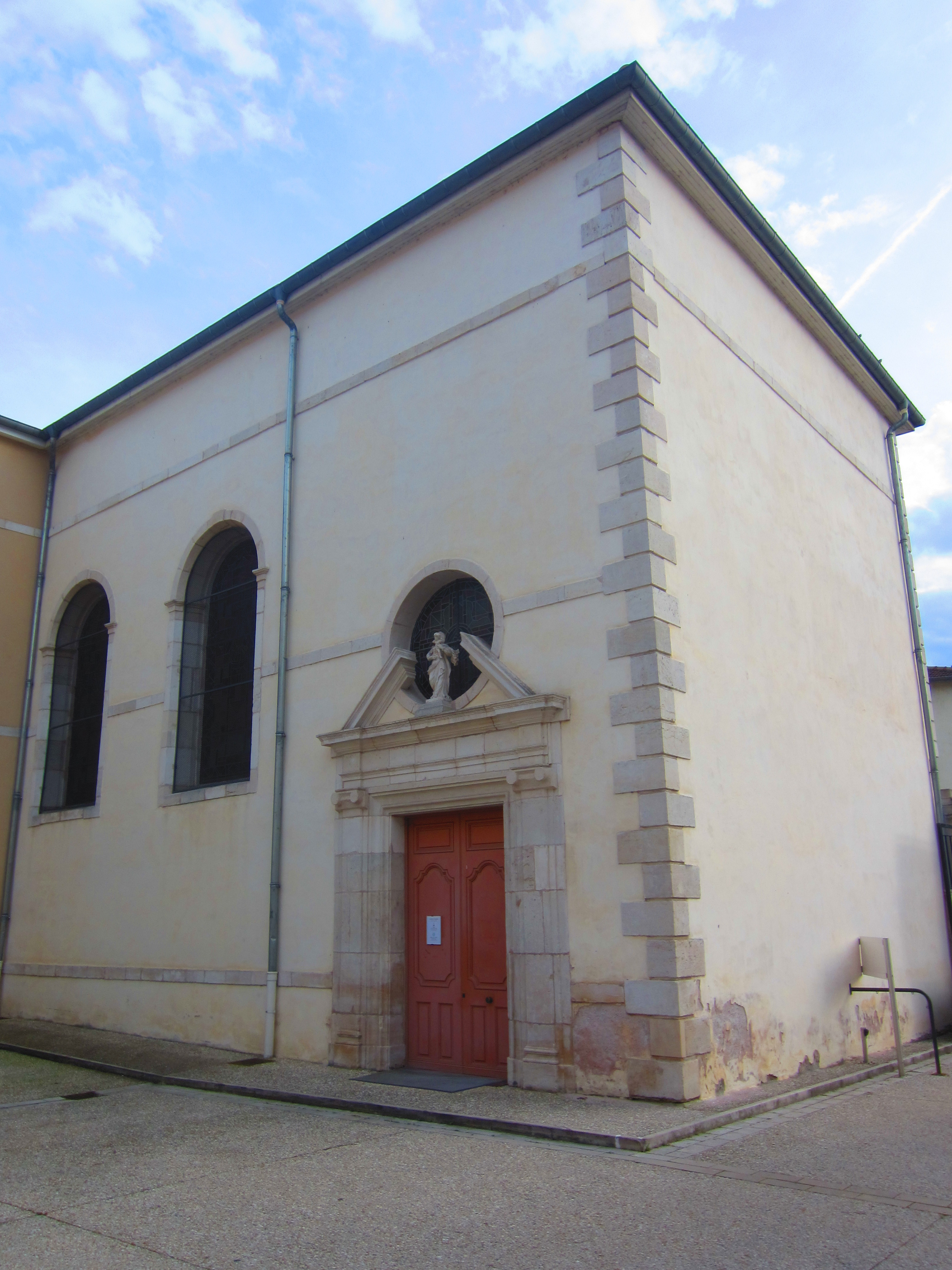

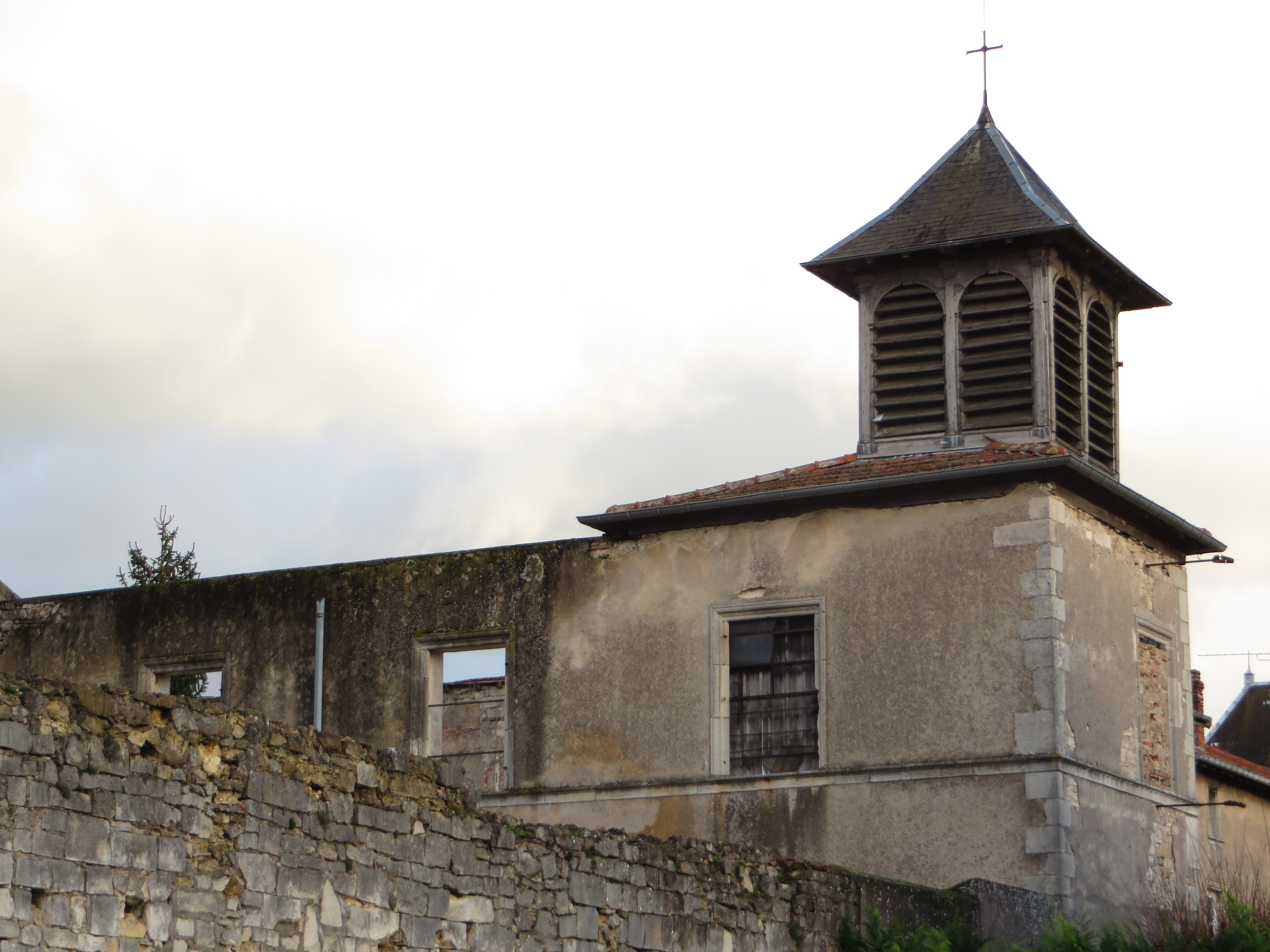

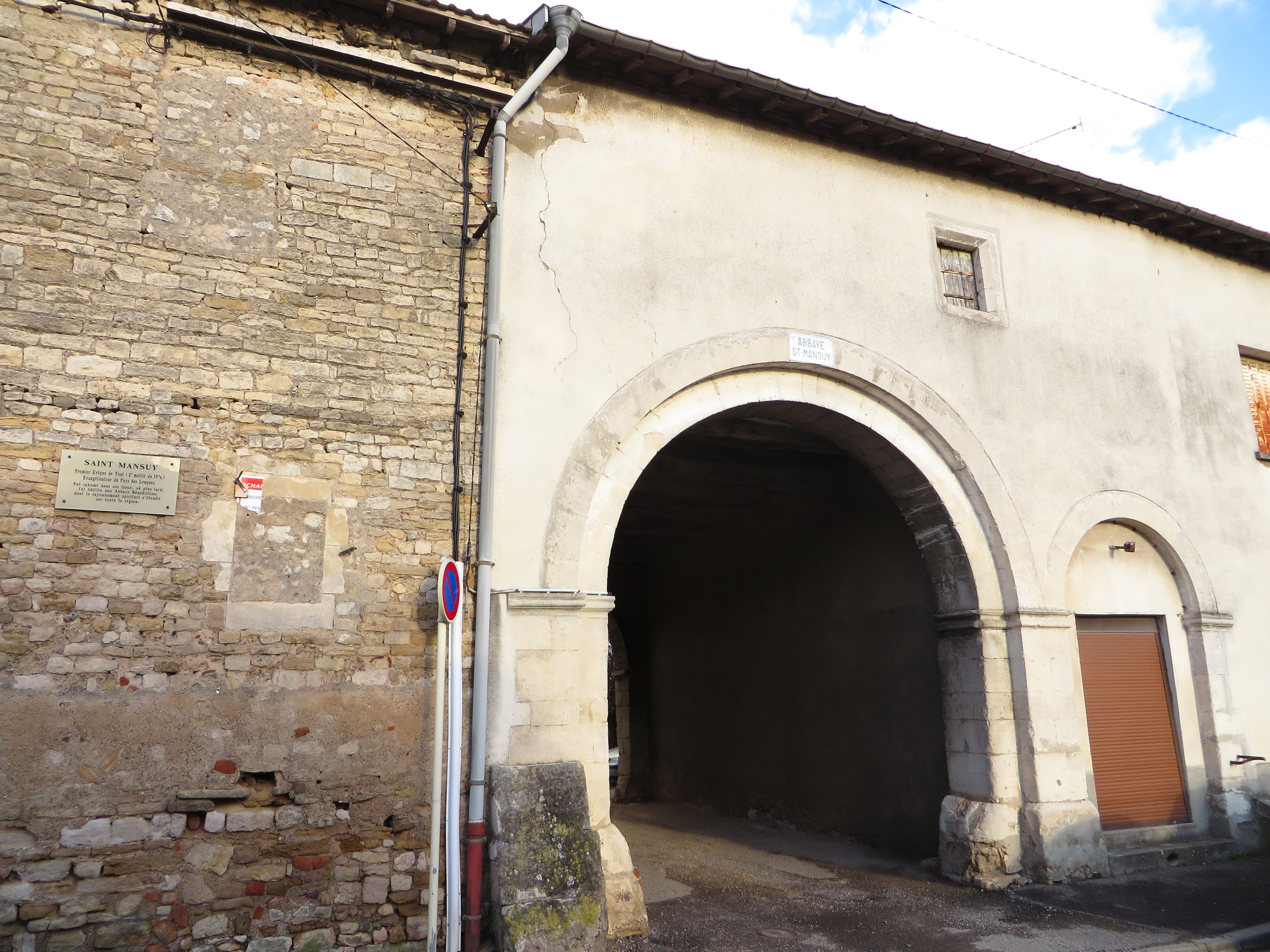

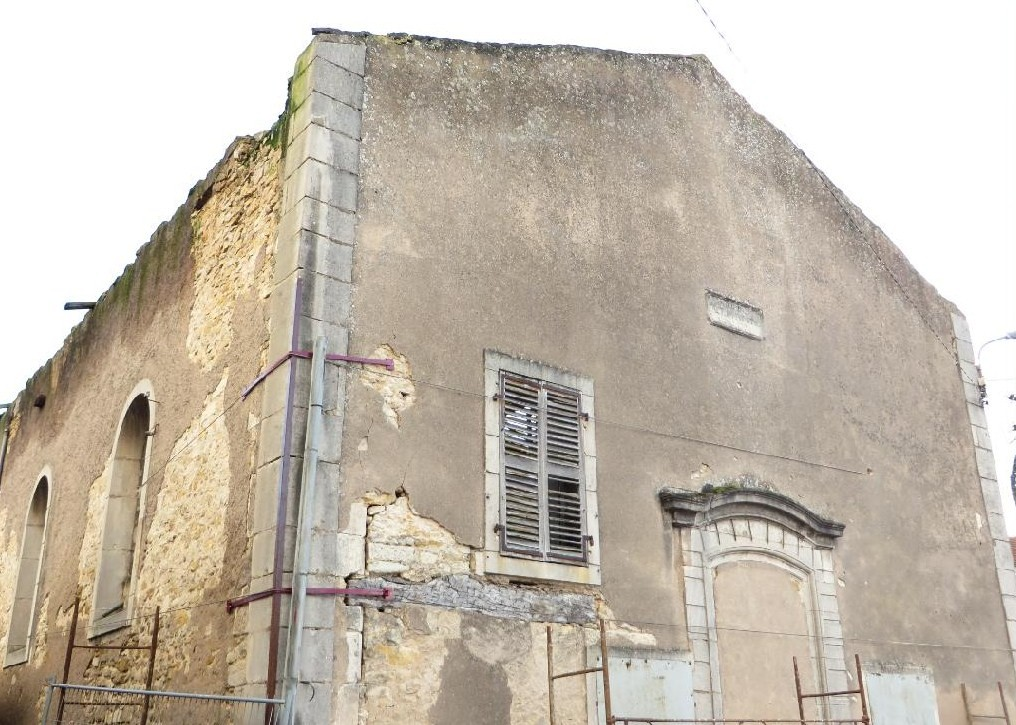

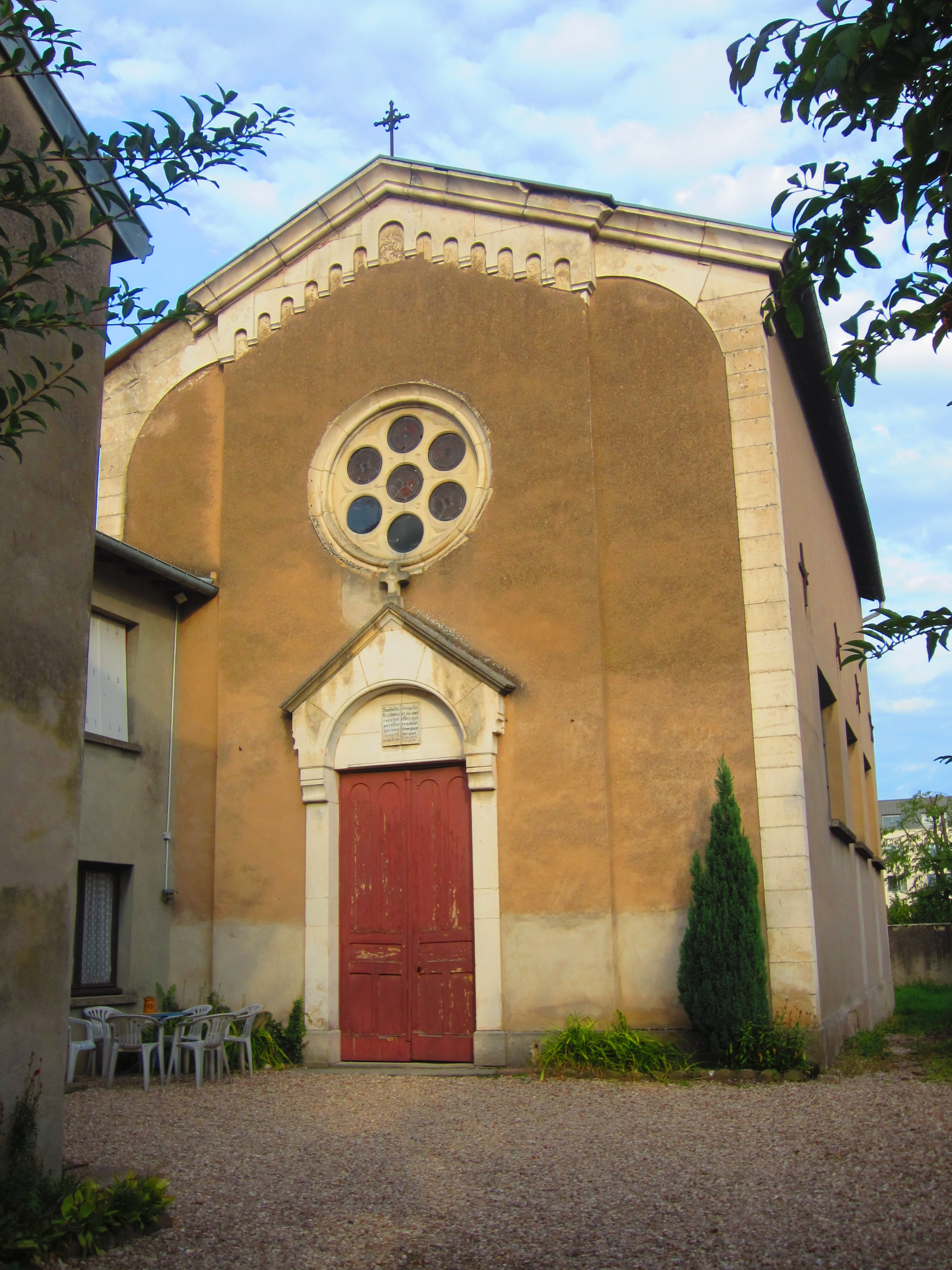

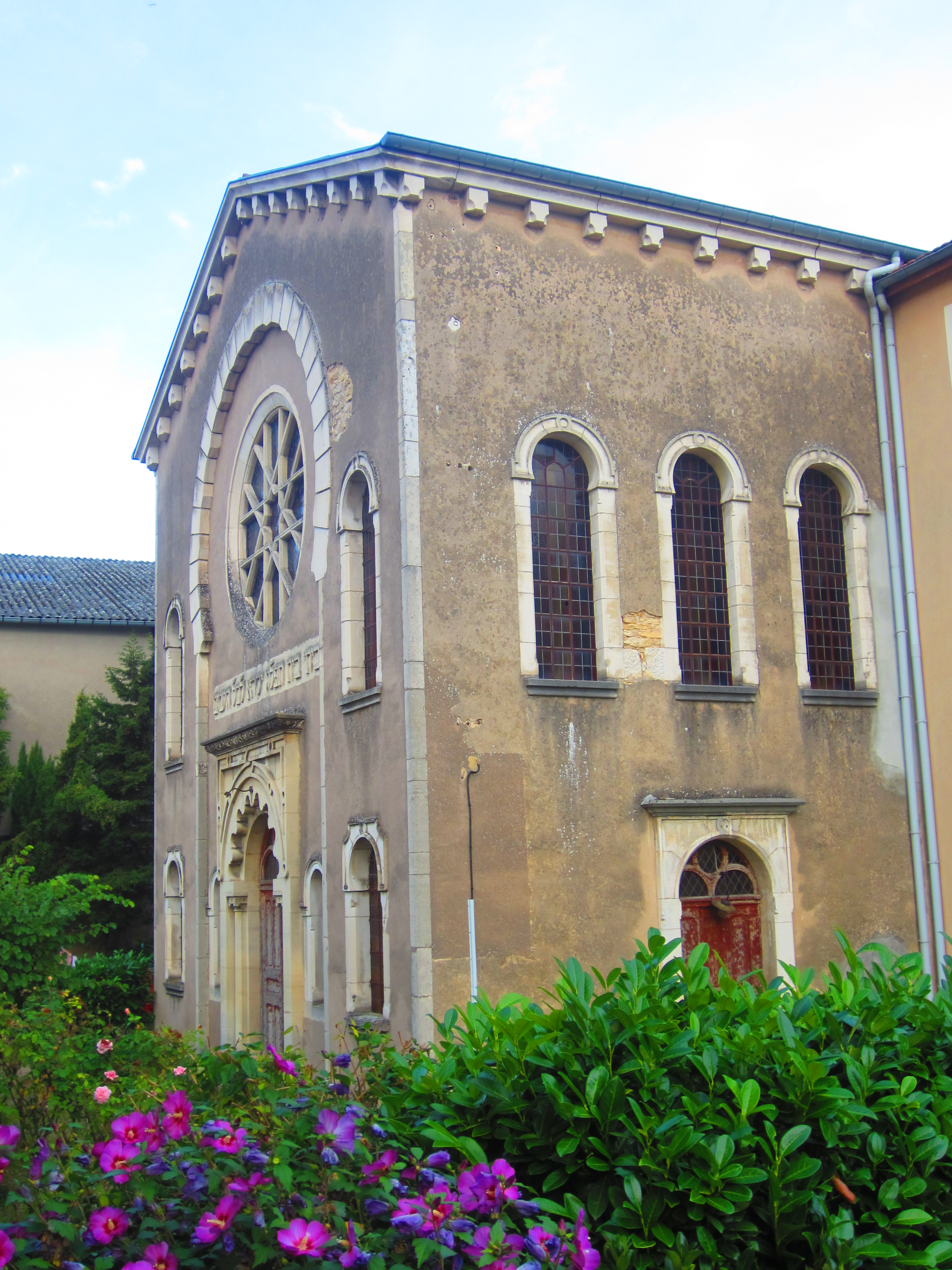

== See also ==
- The Path to Rome – 1902 travelogue by Hilaire Belloc, which begins in Toul
- Toul-Rosières Air Base
