= Canton of Thiaucourt-Regniéville =

Former canton in Meurthe-et-Moselle, France

Coordinates: 48°55′49″N 5°48′58″E

- Former canton
- Location of the canton in the arrondissement of Toul
- Country: France
- Region: Grand Est
- Department: Meurthe-et-Moselle
- No. of communes: {{{nbcomm}}}
- Disbanded: 2015

Government
  - Representatives: Olivier Jacquin
- Area: 188.51 km^{2} (72.78 sq mi)
- Population (2012): 4,816
  - Density: 25.55/km^{2} (66.17/sq mi)

The canton of Thiaucourt-Regniéville (French: Canton de Thiaucourt-Regniéville) is a former French canton located in the department of Meurthe-et-Moselle in the Lorraine region (now part of Grand Est). This canton was organized around Thiaucourt-Regniéville in the arrondissement of Toul. It is now part of the canton of Le Nord-Toulois.

The last general councillor from this canton was Olivier Jacquin (PS), elected in 2004.

== Composition ==
The canton of Thiaucourt-Regniéville grouped together 20 municipalities and had 4,816 inhabitants (2012 census without double counts).

1. Arnaville
2. Bayonville-sur-Mad
3. Bouillonville
4. Charey
5. Dommartin-la-Chaussée
6. Essey-et-Maizerais
7. Euvezin
8. Flirey
9. Jaulny
10. Limey-Remenauville
11. Lironville
12. Pannes
13. Rembercourt-sur-Mad
14. Saint-Baussant
15. Seicheprey
16. Thiaucourt-Regniéville
17. Vandelainville
18. Viéville-en-Haye
19. Vilcey-sur-Trey
20. Xammes
