= 355th Infantry Regiment =

355th Infantry Regiment 355th Regiment
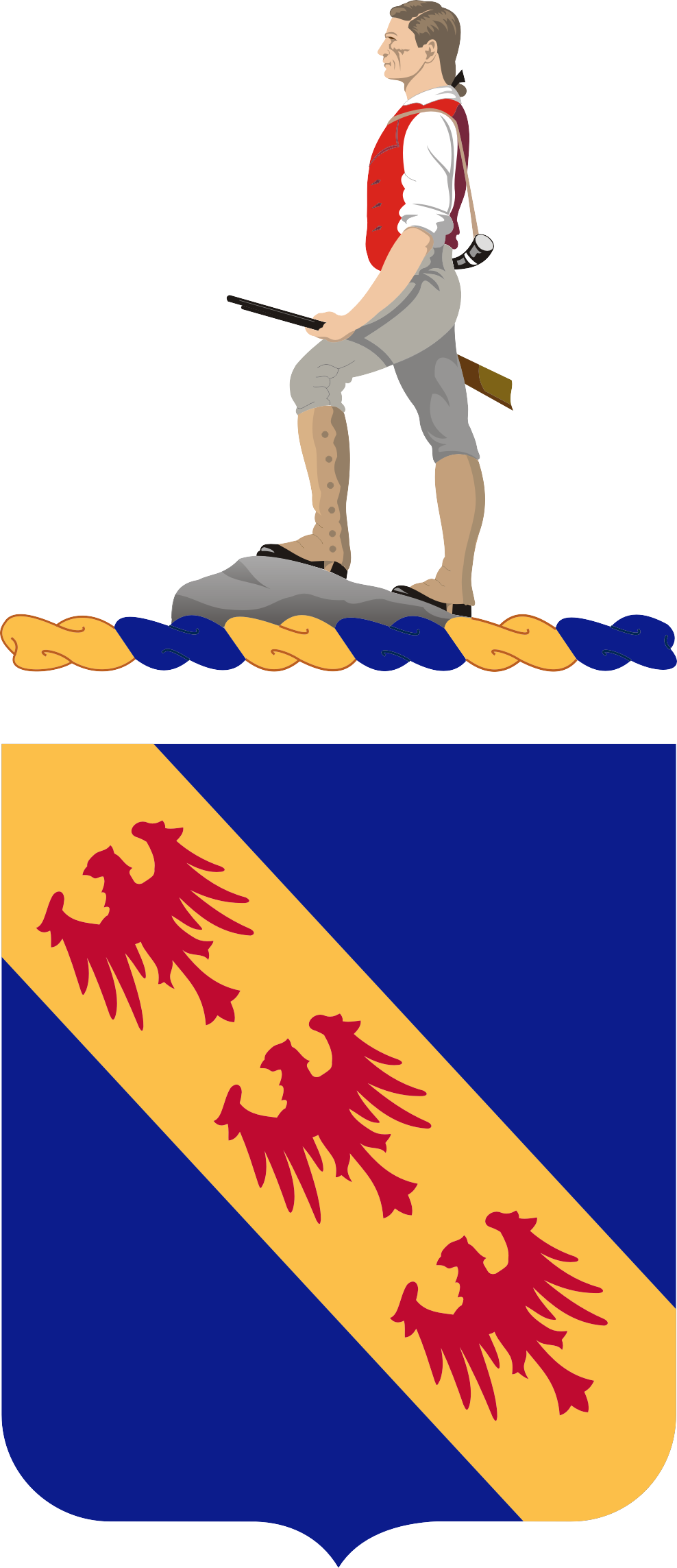
- Coat of arms
- Active: 1917–1919; 1921–1945; 1947–1978 (1st Battalion) 1996–
- Country: USA
- Branch: United States Army Reserve
- Role: Training
- Mottos: Fidem Praestabimus ("We will keep the faith")

Insignia
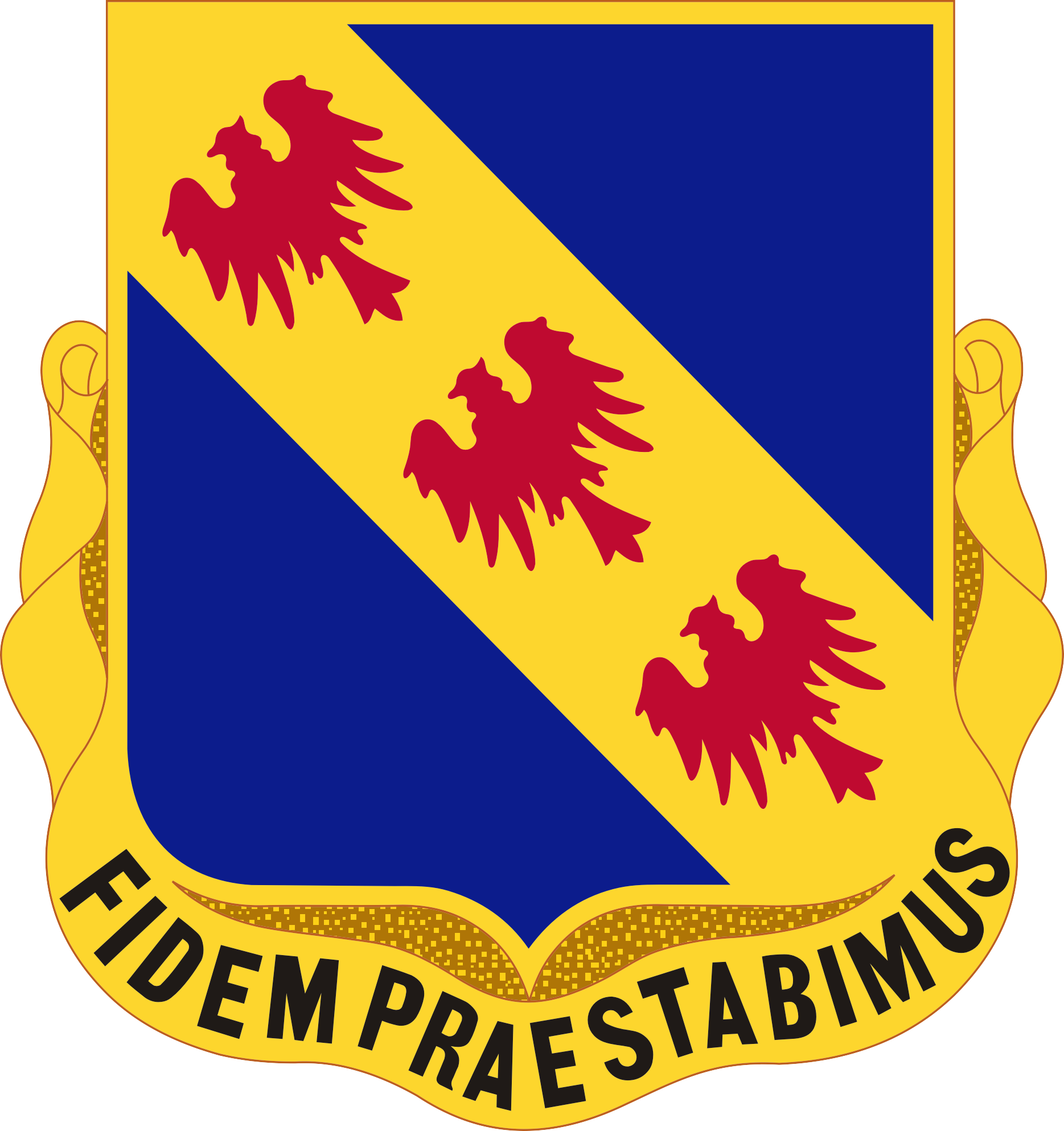
- Distinctive unit insignia

The 355th Infantry Regiment (currently designated the 355th Regiment) is an infantry regiment of the United States Army. The 1st Battalion of the regiment an active unit of the United States Army Reserve.

== History ==
=== World War I ===
The 355th Infantry was constituted on 5 August 1917 in the National Army and assigned to the 89th Division, which was organized under the provisions of the Selective Service Act of 1917. The unit was organized 27 August 1917 at Camp Funston, Kansas. The enlisted men mostly came from the state of Nebraska, the junior officers that were members of the Officers' Reserve Corps or graduates of the First Officers' Training Camp at Fort Riley, Kansas, were generally from Kansas, Missouri, and Colorado, while the senior officers were from the Regular Army. The soldiers drilled ceaselessly over the next eight months despite a lack of adequate equipment, dreadful living conditions, and outbreaks of disease in the camps.

On 21 May 1918, the regiment left Camp Funston for New York and was encamped at Camp Mills, Long Island, on 24-25 May. On 3 June the regiment entrained from Camp Mills and boarded the transport RMS Adriatic at the port of Hoboken, New Jersey. They left for England and arrived at Liverpool in the early morning of 16 June. After a brief stay at Camp Woodley they marched to Southampton and boarded a small steamer for Le Havre, France on 24 June.

The soldiers conducted final training activities before boarding motor buses, a US Army first, and moved to the front near Beaumont on 4 August. The 1st Battalion of the regiment was the first unit from the division to occupy any of the active front and on the night of 7-8 August was subjected to a severe gas shell bombardment. The unit continued on the front lines conducting raids, patrolling the enemy wire, capturing prisoners, and gathering information for the upcoming St. Mihiel offensive.

On the morning of 12 September, after a fierce artillery barrage, the regiment advanced 20 kilometers, capturing the villages of Euvezin, Bouillonville, Beney, and Xammes along with a large number of prisoners and much war material. The unit stayed on the line until 8 October when it was relieved by elements of the 37th Division. They were given a much needed rest, received replacements, and were moved to the Argonne sector in preparation for another push.

On 1 November a new offensive was begun with the regiment held in reserve. After two days of intense fighting the unit took up positions on the front lines to continue the advance taking Barricourt, Beaufort, Laneuville, Luzy, and Cesse before the armistice was signed on 11 November ending hostilities.

On 24 November the regiment crossed the Meuse, Rhine, and Saar rivers to assume occupation duties in the German town of Saarburg. The regiment entered into a strenuous training period and at the final period of training received the highest rating for organizations in the division. On 23 April 1919, General John J. Pershing and Secretary of War Newton D. Baker conducted a final review of the regiment near Trier before the unit was ordered back to the United States.

Movement began on 9 May and the regiment arrived at Brest and embarked on the SS Leviathan, then the largest ship afloat. The SS Leviathan entered New York Harbor on 22 May and the unit headed for Camp Funston where the regiment was demobilized between 1–3 June.

=== Between the wars ===
Per the National Defense Act of 1920, the 355th Infantry was reconstituted on 24 June 1921 in the Organized Reserve and assigned to the 89th Division. On 4 October 1921 it was organized when the regimental headquarters was initiated at Omaha, Nebraska. The 1st Battalion was organized at Omaha, 2nd Battalion at Lincoln, and 3rd Battalion at Hastings. In the mid-1920s, Organized Reserve units with subordinate headquarters that were widely geographically dispersed across the less-populous states began to be reorganized entirely within large population centers in those states; on 12 October 1931, the entire 355th Infantry Regiment was relocated to Omaha. Officers of the 355th Infantry selected for active duty training usually worked with the 7th Division's 17th Infantry Regiment at Fort Crook, Nebraska, or Fort Des Moines, Iowa, or were attached to Nebraska National Guard units at Camp Ashland during the latter's summer training. During the major 1937 Fourth Army maneuvers at Fort Riley, Kansas, the regiment sent a number of officers for attachment to the Nebraska National Guard's 134th Infantry Regiment. As an alternate form of active duty training, 355th Infantry officers assisted in conducting the Citizens' Military Training Camps at Fort Crook. The primary ROTC "feeder" schools for new Reserve lieutenants for the 355th Infantry were Creighton University in Omaha and the University of Nebraska in Lincoln.

=== World War II ===
On 15 July 1942, the regiment was ordered into active military service and reorganized at Camp Carson, Colorado, as a part of the 89th Infantry Division. They conducted basic combat training until May 1943. During this time the 89th Infantry Division was reduced in size and redesignated as the 89th Light Division (Truck). From May 1943 to May 1944, the regiment conducted maneuvers with the division in Louisiana and Hunter Liggett Military Reservation, California. During these maneuvers it was determined that the "Light Division" concept was unsuitable so they turned in their hand carts and jeeps for heavier wheeled vehicles and on 15 June 1944, the division was reorganized as a standard infantry division and redesignated as the 89th Infantry Division. The unit began its last stateside training after moving to Camp Butner, North Carolina in May 1944. The division was finally given orders to move to the European Theater of Operations (ETO) and embarked for New York in December 1944.

The original orders had called for the main units of the 89th Infantry Division to disembark in England and complete further training there before moving to France. The bloody days of the Battle of the Bulge were not long past and the Allied armies were making slow progress against the German Westwall. The orders were changed to have the division land directly in France at Le Havre. The regiment left the United States on board the SS Uruguay on 10 January 1945. The convoy in which they were part passed through the English Channel 19 January and anchored near the mouth of the Seine Estuary, within sight of Le Havre. After disembarking, the regiment was sent to Camp Lucky Strike, northwest of Le Havre, where it reorganized for combat operations. A member of Company C, Private First Class Daniel L. Sutton, was the first man of the division to lose his life to enemy action when he stepped on an antipersonnel mine near the camp on 14 February. The division was ordered into the line in March and was in position by 11 March near Speicher, Germany.

While in the Rhineland, their first action against the Germans was to secure the north and west banks of the Moselle River, one of the last two major natural obstacles defending the Reich, for follow-on crossing operations. A soldier from Company B was the first division member to fire his weapon in anger against the enemy. By 14 March the division effected a crossing and by 24 March reached the banks of the Rhine, Germany's last natural barrier in the west. The division made its crossing at the town of St. Goar and once across the entire 355th Infantry Regiment moved forward to screen the division's front. German resistance began to crumble once American forces crossed the Rhine and raced into Germany. At Ohrdruf, the regiment and elements of the 4th Armored Division captured the largest concentration camp liberated by American forces up to that time. At this point German resistance became disorganized and sporadic. The regiment moved swiftly to Zwickau, near the old Czechoslovak frontier where it fought in the last action of the war for the division. It fell by 19 April and the unit ceased forward momentum for the last few weeks of the war. They conducted patrols to mop up small pockets of resistance that remained in the region. The German surrender became official one minute past midnight 9 May, however, this was tempered by the knowledge that occupation duties in Europe or shipment to the Pacific Theater was probable.

On 27 May orders came down for the unit to leave Germany and move back to France in the vicinity of Le Havre. The regiment encamped at Camp Old Gold near Doudeville and started its new mission of processing the veterans of the ETO back to the United States. In total, the division processed 343,733 troops from 5 June to 1 September. That fall the regiment was transported back to the United States and it was finally inactivated 20 December 1945, at Camp Kilmer, New Jersey.

=== Postwar period ===
The regiment was activated 31 January 1947, in the Organized Reserve with headquarters at Omaha, Nebraska. The Organized Reserve Corps was redesignated as the Army Reserve on 9 July 1952. On 1 October 1959, the 355th Infantry Regiment was reorganized and redesignated the 355th Regiment and it became an element of the 89th Division (Training). On 1 January 1975, the 1st Battalion fell under 5th Brigade (Training). The 1st Battalion was inactivated 15 October 1978 and was relieved from assignment to the 5th Brigade (Training).

On 17 October 1996, the 4th Battalion, 89th Field Artillery was redesignated the 1st Battalion, 355th Regiment, becoming an element of the 1st Brigade, 95th Division (Institutional Training). The 1st Battalion Headquarters is located in Round Rock, Texas. On 1 April 2008, the 1st Battalion was ordered to active duty in support of the war on terrorism and assigned to the 434th Field Artillery Brigade at Fort Sill, near Lawton, Oklahoma.

== Lineage ==
- Constituted 5 August 1917 in the National Army as the 355th Infantry and assigned to the 89th Division.
- Organized 27 August 1917 at Camp Funston, Kansas
- Demobilized 1–3 June 1919 at Camp Funston, Kansas
- Reconstituted 24 June 1921 in the Organized Reserves as the 355th Infantry and assigned to the 89th Division (later redesignated as the 89th Infantry Division)
- Organized in October 1921 with headquarters at Omaha, Nebraska
- Ordered into active military service 15 July 1942 and reorganized at Camp Carson, Colorado
- Inactivated 20 December 1945 at Camp Kilmer, New Jersey
- Activated 31 January 1947 in the Organized Reserves with headquarters at Omaha, Nebraska
- (Organized Reserves redesignated 25 March 1948 as the Organized Reserve Corps; redesignated 9 July 1952 as the Army Reserve)
- (Location of headquarters changed 20 October 1952 to Lincoln, Nebraska)
- Reorganized and redesignated 1 October 1959 as the 355th Regiment, an element of the 89th Division (Training), with headquarters at Lincoln, Nebraska
- Reorganized 31 January 1968 to consist of the 1st and 3d Battalions, elements of the 89th Division (Training)
- Reorganized 1 January 1975 to consist of the 1st and 3d Battalions, elements of the 5th Brigade (Training)
- 1st and 3d Battalions inactivated 15 October 1978 and relieved from assignment to the 5th Brigade (Training)
- 355th Regiment reorganized 17 October 1996 to consist of the 1st, 2d, and 3d Battalions, elements of the 95th Division (Institutional Training)

== Coat of arms ==
=== Crest ===
That for the regiments and separate battalions of the Army Reserve: On a wreath of the colors or and azure, the Lexington Minute Man proper. The statue of the Minute Man, Captain John Parker, stands on the Common in Lexington, Massachusetts.

=== Shield ===
Azure, on a bend or three alerions gules.

=== Distinctive insignia ===
The insignia is the shield and motto of the coat of arms. The sample of the insignia was approved 27 June 1927.

=== Symbolism ===
The shield is blue for infantry. The bend and alerions are taken from the arms of Lorraine and commemorate service in France during World War I. The three alerions allude to the service in the St. Mihiel and Meuse-Argonne offensives and the Lorraine sector.

=== Campaign streamers ===
==== World War I ====
- St. Mihiel
- Meuse-Argonne
- Lorraine 1918

==== World War II ====
- Rhineland
- Central Europe
