= Rembercourt =

Rembercourt may refer to:

- Rembercourt-Sommaisne, a commune in the Meuse department of Lorraine, France
  - Rembercourt Aerodrome, a temporary World War I airfield nearby
- Rembercourt-sur-Mad, a commune in the Meurthe-et-Moselle department of Lorraine, France

== See also ==
- Raimbeaucourt, a commune in the Nord department of Nord-Pas-de-Calais, France
