= Waville =

- Commune
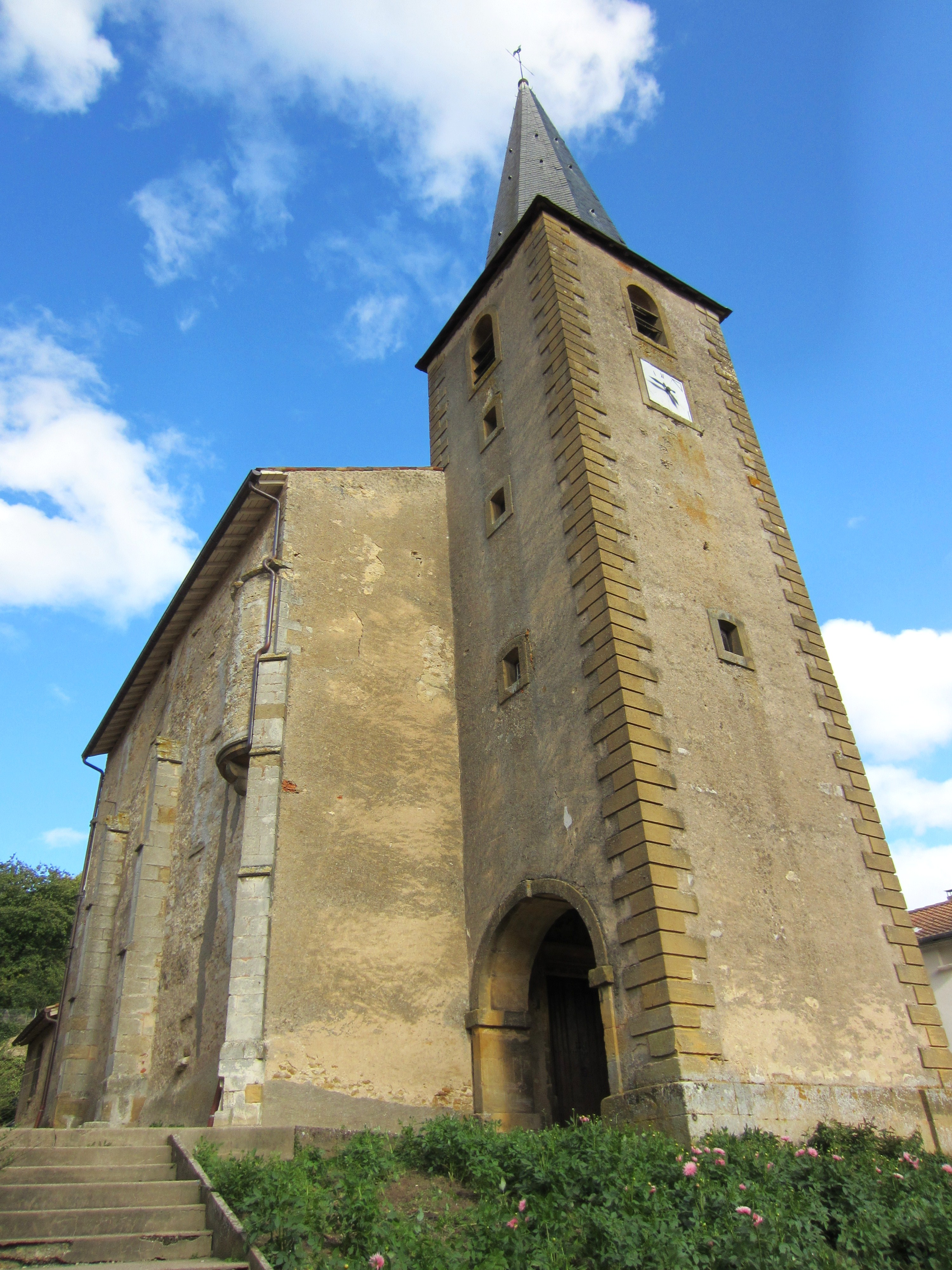
- Church of Waville

- Coat of arms
- Location of Waville
- Location within France Location within Grand Est
- Coordinates: 49°00′40″N 5°57′01″E
- Country: France
- Region: Grand Est
- Department: Meurthe-et-Moselle
- Arrondissement: Toul
- Canton: Pont-à-Mousson
- Intercommunality: Mad et Moselle

Government
  - Mayor (2020–2026): Isabelle Collignon
- Area^{1}: 11.43 km^{2} (4.41 sq mi)
- Elevation: 240 m (790 ft)
- Highest elevation: 340 m (1,120 ft)
- Lowest elevation: 187 m (614 ft)
- Population (2023): 433
  - Density: 37.9/km^{2} (98.1/sq mi)
- Time zone: UTC+01:00 (CET)
  - Summer (DST): UTC+02:00 (CEST)
- INSEE/Postal code: 54593 /54890
- ^{1} French Land Register data, which excludes lakes, ponds, glaciers > 1 km^{2} (0.386 sq mi or 247 acres) and river estuaries.

Waville (French pronunciation: [wavil]) is a commune in the Meurthe-et-Moselle department in north-eastern France.

== Geography ==
The village lies on the left bank of the Rupt de Mad, which forms the commune's south-eastern border.

== Population ==
Historical population
Year	Pop.	±% p.a.
1968	376	—
1975	363	−0.50%
1982	396	+1.25%
1990	406	+0.31%
1999	386	−0.56%
2007	438	+1.59%
2012	435	−0.14%
2017	429	−0.28%
2023	433	+0.15%
Source: INSEE

== See also ==
- Communes of the Meurthe-et-Moselle department
- Parc naturel régional de Lorraine
