= André Amellér =

French composer and conductor

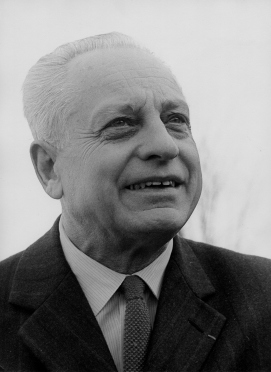
- André Amellér circa 1980
- Born: January 2, 1912
- Died: May 14, 1990 (aged 78)
- Occupations: Composer and Conductor

André Amellér (2 January 1912 – 14 May 1990) was a French composer and conductor. He is considered part of the French school of 20th-century classical music.

Amellér played double bass for the Opéra national de Paris from 1937 to 1953, except for a brief period spent as a prisoner of war in Germany. He was the director of the conservatoire national in Dijon from 1953 to 1981.

== Education ==
Amellér was born in Arnaville, Meurthe et Moselle to a family of amateur musicians. He began studying violin at a young age in the family's home in Chelles. He later began playing double bass. In January 1930, he joined the 24th Infantry Regiment of the French Army, playing in the regiment band.

While still a soldier, Amellér began his studies at the Conservatoire National Supérieur de Paris in 1931 under Édouard Nanny. He played for Concerts Poulet in 1932, then joined the Pasdeloup orchestra. He appeared as a soldier in the film Wooden Crosses, and used the money from that role to buy his first double bass. In 1934, he graduated with honours from the Conservatoire de Paris with a degree in double bass. Between 1934 and 1947, he also received degrees in conducting, harmony, fugue, counterpoint, composition and music history.

== Career ==
In 1937, Amellér won a position as double bassist in the Opéra national de Paris. He played under conductors Bruno Walter, Arturo Toscanini, Wilhelm Furtwängler, Albert Wolff and Paul Paray. When France entered World War II, his regiment was mobilized; he was taken prisoner and spent time as a prisoner of war in Oflag XIII. After being liberated, he returned to his position in the Opéra national in 1942.

In April 1953, Amellér became the director of the École Nationale de Musique in Dijon. He began adding classes and recruiting more teachers to the school. He also participated in the UNESCO International Conference on the Role and Place of Music in Education of Youth and Adults in Brussels. In 1977, the school became the Conservatoire National de Région pour la Musique, l'Art Dramatique et la Danse. Amellér retired as director in 1981.

Amellér was the vice-president of the International Society for Music Education (ISME) from 1972 to 1976. He was also the president of the Ordre National des Musiciens and the Confédération Musicale de France.

Amellér was also a prolific composer, creating almost 400 works, including pieces for orchestra, voice, and numerous solo instruments.

== Major compositions ==
Amellér composed numerous works, including:

Operas

- La lance de Fingal (1957)
- Cyrnos (1951-1960)

Orchestral works

- Annapurna (1952)
- Danse de Séléné (1955)
- À quoi rêvent les jeunes filles (1957)
- Hétérodoxes (1970)
- Dentelles et Broderies valencianes (1973)
- Airs hétérogène (1966)
- Crescendo pour grande formation d'harmonie (1974)
- Les Camisards, symphonic poem (1975)

Concertante

- Concerto for cello and orchestra (1947)
- Fantaisie for 2 guitars and string orchestra (1986)

Chamber music

- Sarabande for viola solo, Op.80 (1953)
- Jeux de table for alto saxophone and piano (1954)
- Trois pièces faciles (3 Easy Pieces) for viola and piano, Op.208 (1973)
- Mon premier concert (My First Concert), 6 Easy Pieces for viola and piano, Op.218 (1975)
- L'arc-en-ciel (The Rainbow), 7 Easy Pieces for viola and piano, Op.221 (1975)
- Sourire (Smile) for viola and piano, Op.307 (1983)
- Petit nuage (Little Cloud) for viola and piano, Op.308 (1983)
- Suite florentine for cello solo (1984)
- Sonatina for viola or violin, Op.357 (1984)
- Speranza for viola or violin and piano, Op.375 (1986)

== Awards ==
- Officer of the Légion d'Honneur (1978)
- Commander of the Ordre National du Mérite (1975)
- Commander of the Palmes Académiques (1981)
- Chevalier des Arts et Lettres (1960)
- Médaille de Vermeil de la Ville de Paris (1987)
