= Rupt de Mad =

River in France

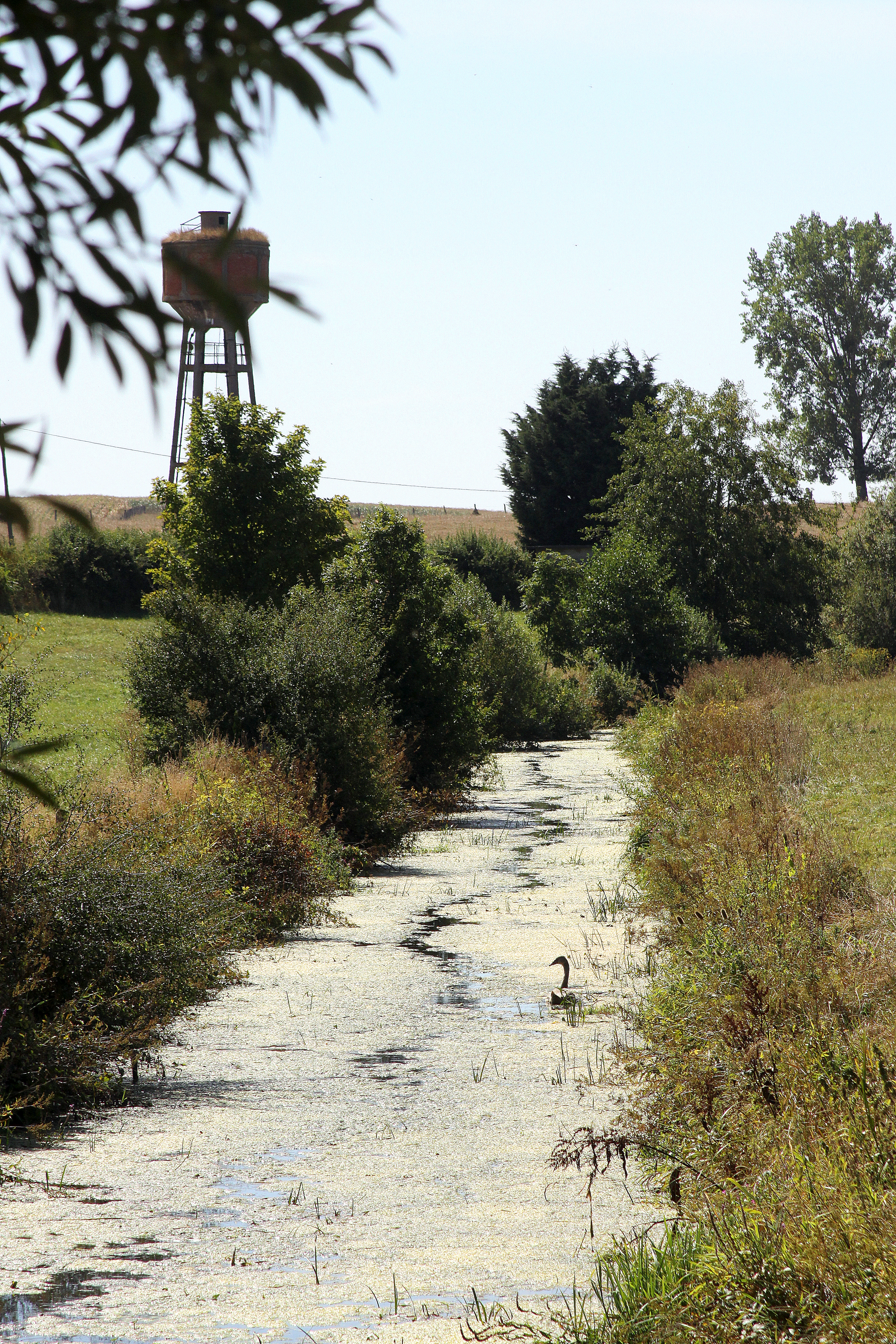
- The Rupt de Mad at Lahayville

- Location within France Location within Grand Est

Location
- Country: France

Physical characteristics
- Source
  - location: Geville
  - coordinates: 48°47′48″N 05°42′33″E
  - elevation: 240 m (790 ft)
- Mouth
  - location: Moselle
  - coordinates: 49°00′47″N 06°02′38″E
  - elevation: 170 m (560 ft)
- Length: 54.6 km (33.9 mi)
- Basin size: 385 km^{2} (149 sq mi)
- Discharge
  - average: 3.65 m^{3}/s (129 cu ft/s)

Basin features
- Progression: Moselle→ Rhine→ North Sea

The Rupt de Mad (French pronunciation: [ʁypt də mad]) is a 54.6-kilometre (33.9 mi) long river in the Meuse and Meurthe-et-Moselle départements, northeastern France. Its source is several small streams which rise at Geville, 17 kilometres (11 mi) northwest of Toul. It flows generally northeast. It is a left tributary of the Moselle into which it flows at Arnaville, 15 kilometres (9 mi) southwest of Metz.

== Départements and communes along its course ==
This list is ordered from source to mouth:

- Meuse: Geville, Broussey-Raulecourt, Bouconville-sur-Madt, Rambucourt, Xivray-et-Marvoisin, Richecourt, Lahayville
- Meurthe-et-Moselle: Saint-Baussant, Essey-et-Maizerais, Pannes, Euvezin, Bouillonville, Thiaucourt-Regniéville, Jaulny, Rembercourt-sur-Mad, Waville, Villecey-sur-Mad, Onville, Vandelainville, Bayonville-sur-Mad, Arnaville
