= Villecey-sur-Mad =

- Commune
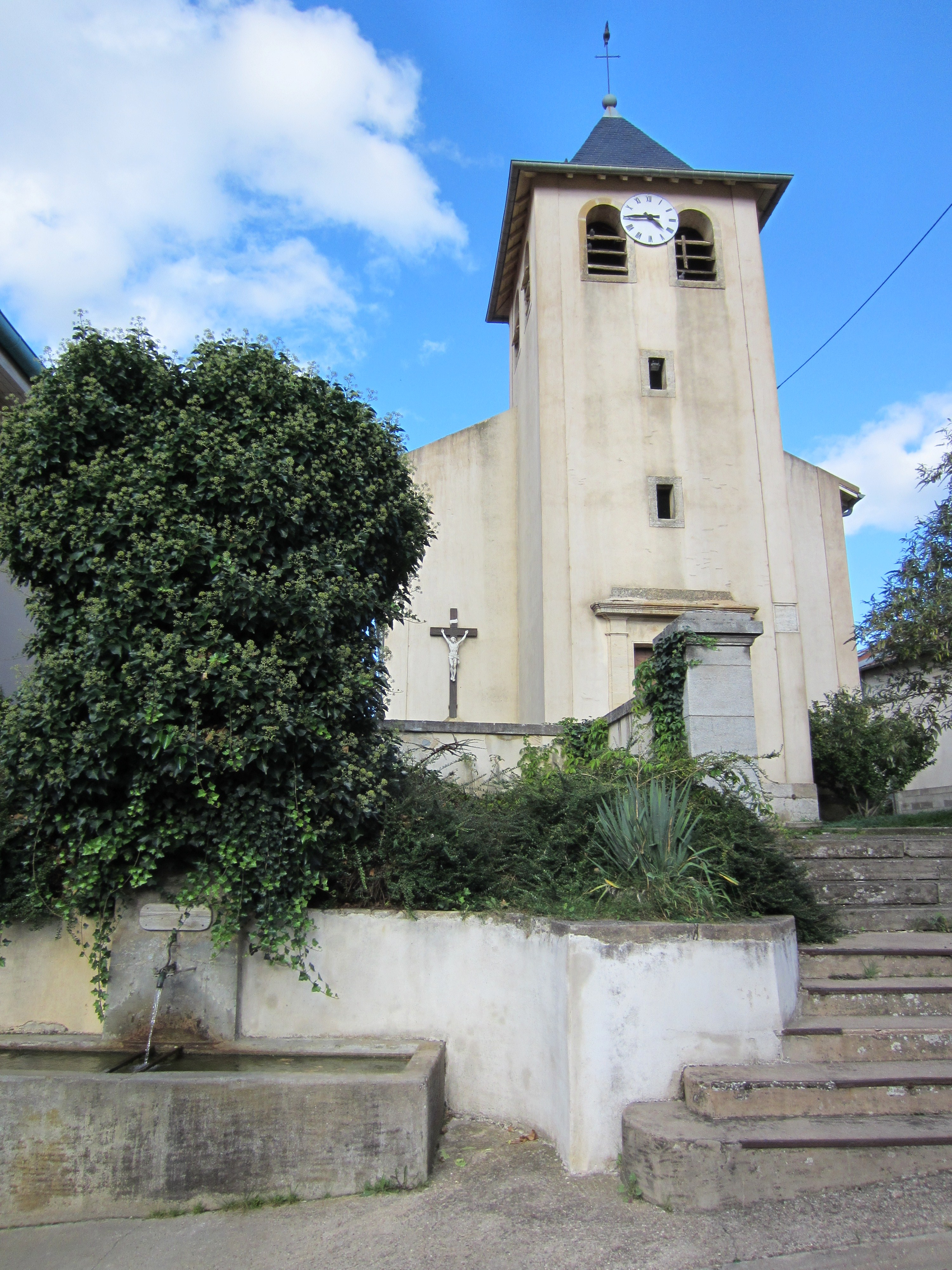
- The church in Villecey-sur-Mad

- Coat of arms
- Location of Villecey-sur-Mad
- Location within France Location within Grand Est
- Coordinates: 49°00′27″N 5°57′35″E
- Country: France
- Region: Grand Est
- Department: Meurthe-et-Moselle
- Arrondissement: Toul
- Canton: Pont-à-Mousson
- Intercommunality: Mad et Moselle

Government
  - Mayor (2020–2026): Pierre-David Jacqueson
- Area^{1}: 7.41 km^{2} (2.86 sq mi)
- Elevation: 195 m (640 ft)
- Highest elevation: 361 m (1,184 ft)
- Lowest elevation: 188 m (617 ft)
- Population (2023): 344
  - Density: 46.4/km^{2} (120/sq mi)
- Time zone: UTC+01:00 (CET)
  - Summer (DST): UTC+02:00 (CEST)
- INSEE/Postal code: 54570 /54890
- ^{1} French Land Register data, which excludes lakes, ponds, glaciers > 1 km^{2} (0.386 sq mi or 247 acres) and river estuaries.

Villecey-sur-Mad (French pronunciation: [vilsɛ syʁ mad], literally Villecey on Mad) is a commune in the Meurthe-et-Moselle department in north-eastern France.

== Geography ==
The village lies on the right bank of the Rupt de Mad, which forms the commune's north-western border.

== See also ==
- Communes of the Meurthe-et-Moselle department
- Parc naturel régional de Lorraine
