= Broussey-Raulecourt =

- Commune
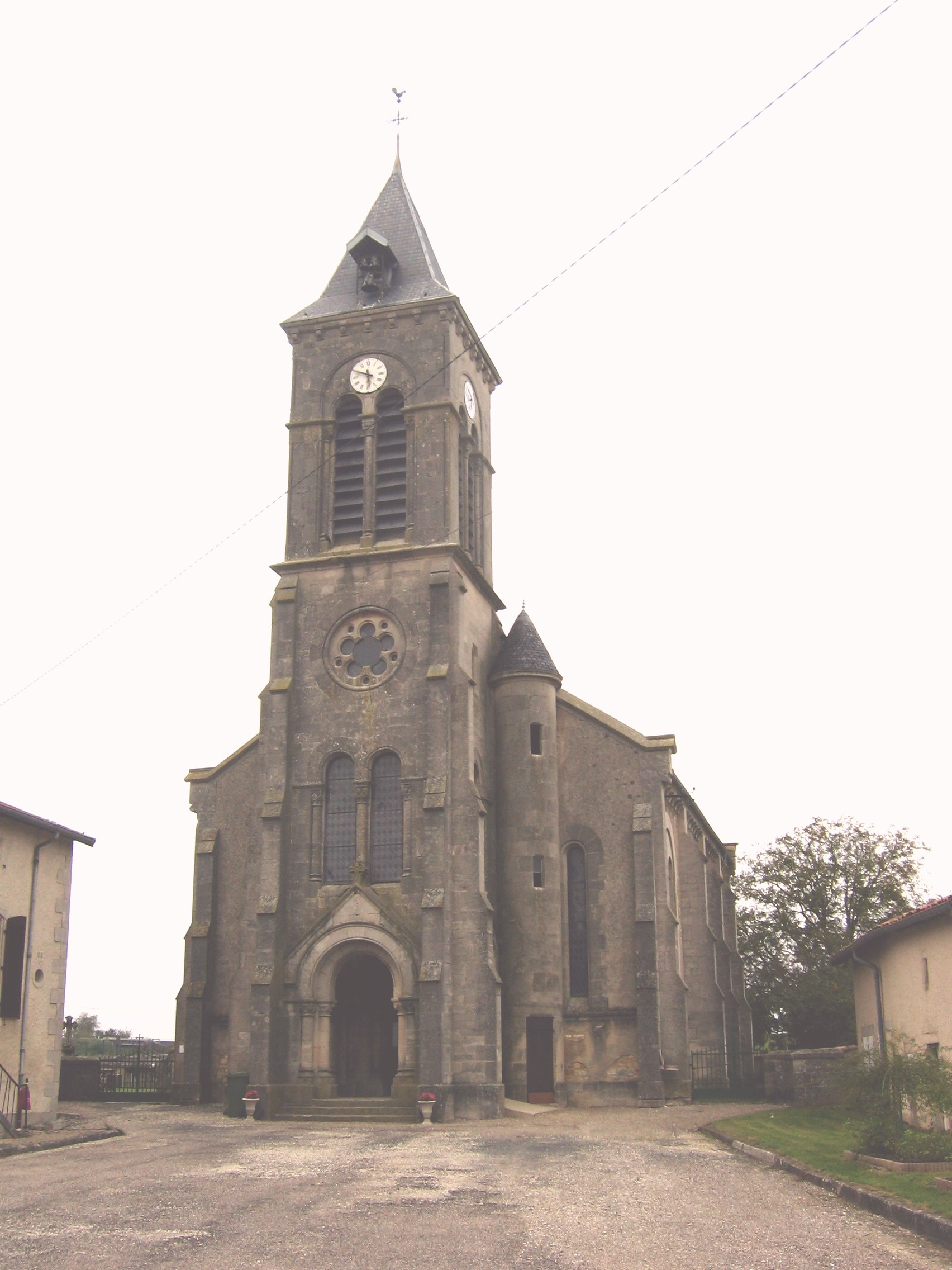
- The church in Broussey

- Coat of arms
- Location of Broussey-Raulecourt
- Location within France Location within Grand Est
- Coordinates: 48°49′31″N 5°42′17″E
- Country: France
- Region: Grand Est
- Department: Meuse
- Arrondissement: Commercy
- Canton: Saint-Mihiel
- Intercommunality: Côtes de Meuse Woëvre

Government
  - Mayor (2020–2026): Joël Klein
- Area^{1}: 21.02 km^{2} (8.12 sq mi)
- Elevation: 180 m (590 ft)
- Highest elevation: 254 m (833 ft)
- Lowest elevation: 228 m (748 ft)
- Population (2023): 283
  - Density: 13.5/km^{2} (34.9/sq mi)
- Time zone: UTC+01:00 (CET)
  - Summer (DST): UTC+02:00 (CEST)
- INSEE/Postal code: 55085 /55200
- ^{1} French Land Register data, which excludes lakes, ponds, glaciers > 1 km^{2} (0.386 sq mi or 247 acres) and river estuaries.

Broussey-Raulecourt (French pronunciation: [bʁusɛ ʁolkuʁ]) is a commune in the Meuse department in Grand Est in northeastern France.

== Geography ==
The Broussey-en-Woëvre village lies on the left bank of the Rupt de Mad, which flows northwest through the commune. Raulecourt, the other village in the commune, is located in its eastern part.

== Population ==
Historical population
Year	Pop.	±% p.a.
1968	251	—
1975	212	−2.38%
1982	216	+0.27%
1990	204	−0.71%
1999	217	+0.69%
2007	252	+1.89%
2012	264	+0.93%
2017	283	+1.40%
2023	283	+0.00%
Source: INSEE

== See also ==
- Communes of the Meuse department
- Parc naturel régional de Lorraine
