= Geville =

- Commune
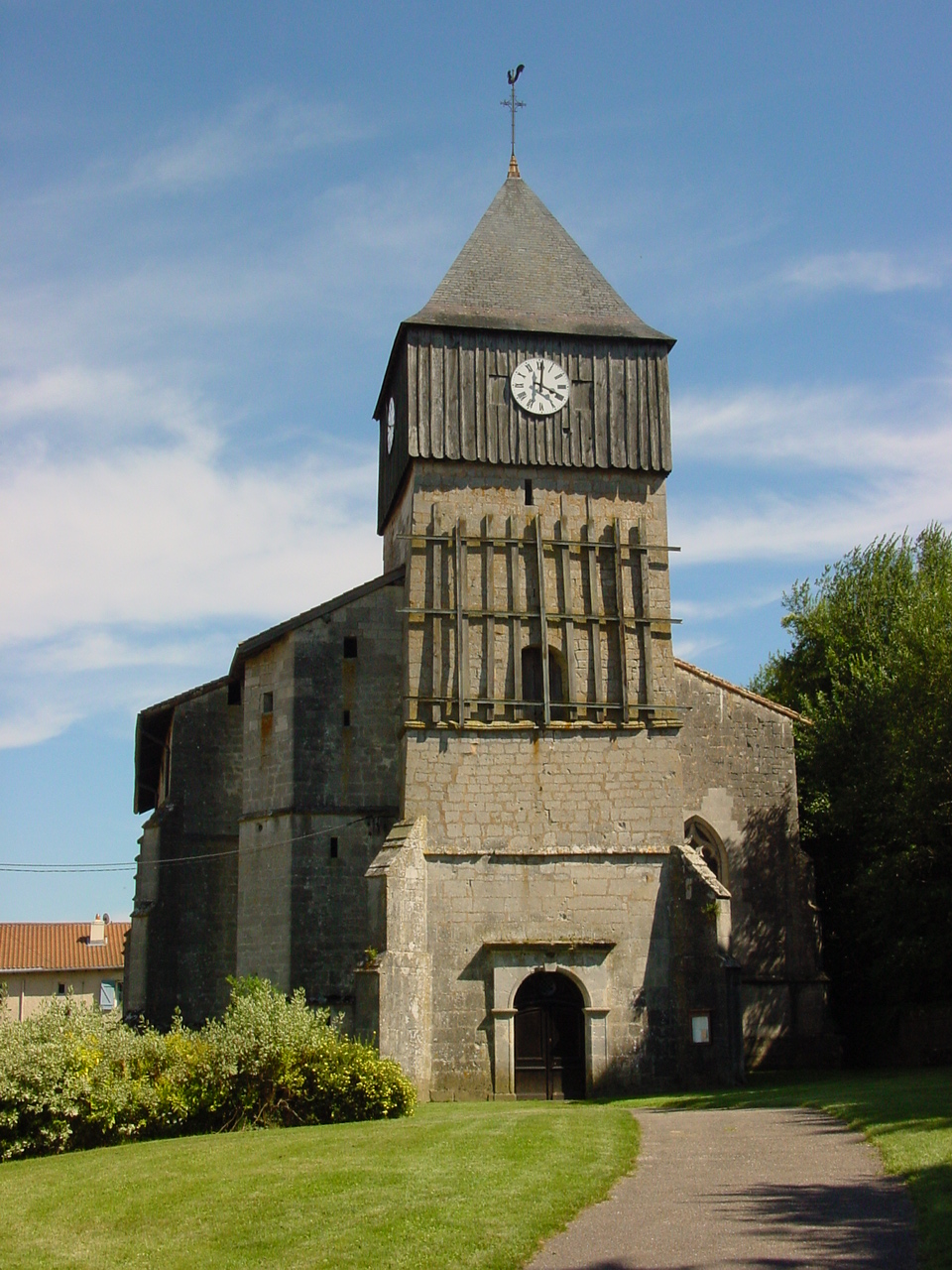
- The Gironville church in Geville

- Coat of arms
- Location of Geville
- Location within France Location within Grand Est
- Coordinates: 48°46′19″N 5°41′39″E
- Country: France
- Region: Grand Est
- Department: Meuse
- Arrondissement: Commercy
- Canton: Commercy
- Intercommunality: CC Côtes de Meuse Woëvre

Government
  - Mayor (2020–2026): Pierre Brasseur
- Area^{1}: 33 km^{2} (13 sq mi)
- Elevation: 280 m (920 ft)
- Highest elevation: 400 m (1,300 ft)
- Lowest elevation: 233 m (764 ft)
- Population (2023): 639
  - Density: 19/km^{2} (50/sq mi)
- Time zone: UTC+01:00 (CET)
  - Summer (DST): UTC+02:00 (CEST)
- INSEE/Postal code: 55258 /55200
- ^{1} French Land Register data, which excludes lakes, ponds, glaciers > 1 km^{2} (0.386 sq mi or 247 acres) and river estuaries.

Geville (French pronunciation: [ʒevil]; also Géville) is a commune in the Meuse department in Grand Est in north-eastern France. It was created in 1973 by the merger of three former communes: Corniéville, Gironville-sous-les-Côtes and Jouy-sous-les-Côtes.

== Geography ==
The commune counts three small villages: Jouy-sous-les-Côtes and Corniéville, in its southern part; Gironville-sous-les-Côtes, in its northern part.

The Rupt de Mad has its source in the commune.

== See also ==
- Communes of the Meuse department
- Parc naturel régional de Lorraine
