= Bayonville-sur-Mad =

- Commune
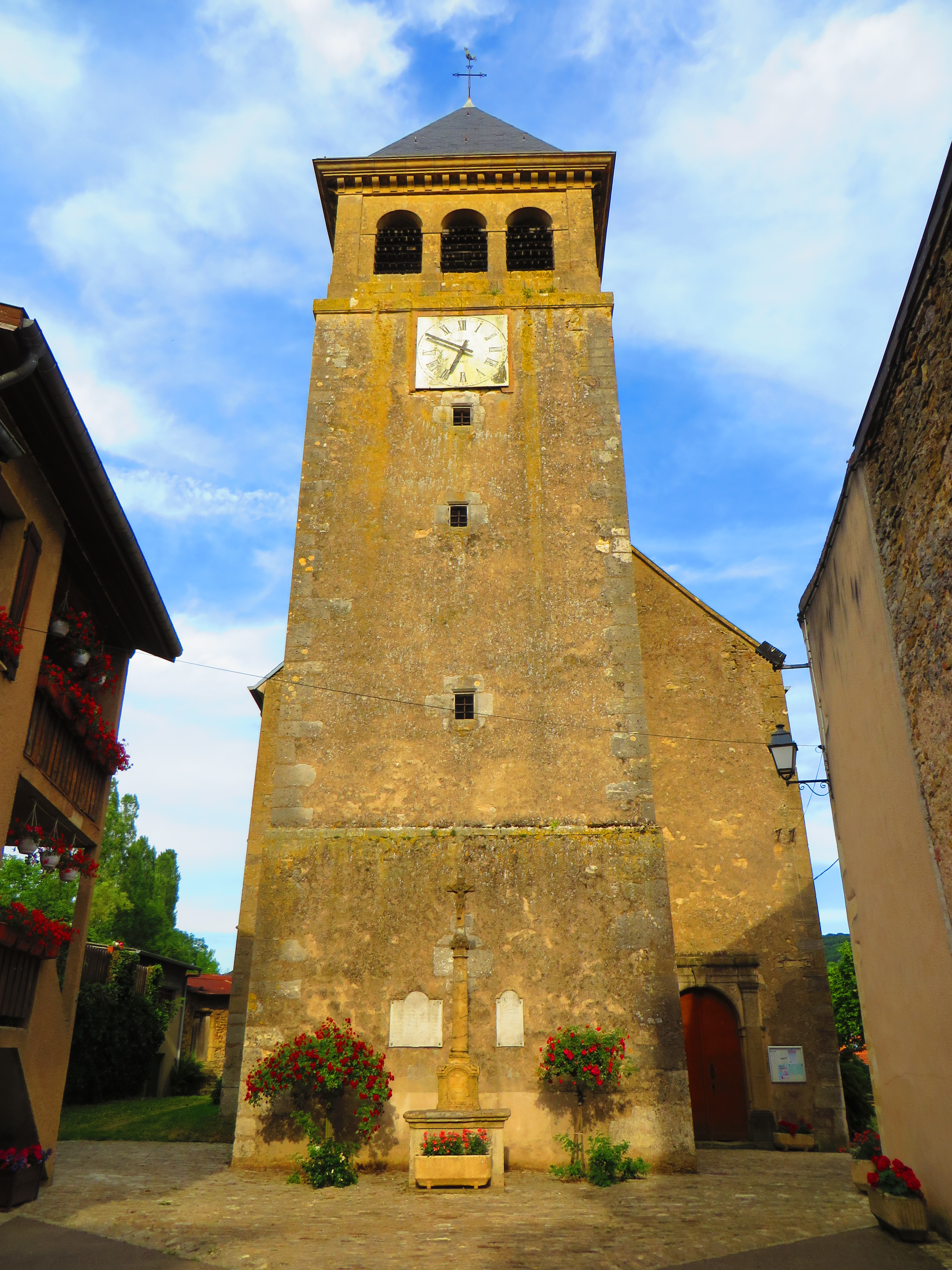
- The church in Bayonville-sur-Mad

- Coat of arms
- Location of Bayonville-sur-Mad
- Location within France Location within Grand Est
- Coordinates: 49°00′56″N 5°59′27″E
- Country: France
- Region: Grand Est
- Department: Meurthe-et-Moselle
- Arrondissement: Toul
- Canton: Pont-à-Mousson

Government
  - Mayor (2020–2026): Marie-Line Roch
- Area^{1}: 9.39 km^{2} (3.63 sq mi)
- Elevation: 185 m (607 ft)
- Highest elevation: 366 m (1,201 ft)
- Lowest elevation: 181 m (594 ft)
- Population (2023): 331
  - Density: 35.3/km^{2} (91.3/sq mi)
- Time zone: UTC+01:00 (CET)
  - Summer (DST): UTC+02:00 (CEST)
- INSEE/Postal code: 54055 /54890
- ^{1} French Land Register data, which excludes lakes, ponds, glaciers > 1 km^{2} (0.386 sq mi or 247 acres) and river estuaries.

Bayonville-sur-Mad (French pronunciation: [bajɔ̃vil syʁ mad], literally Bayonville on Mad) is a commune in the Meurthe-et-Moselle department in northeastern France.

== Geography ==
The Rupt de Mad flows east through the middle of the commune and crosses the village.

== Population ==
Historical population
Year	Pop.	±% p.a.
1968	370	—
1975	395	+0.94%
1982	340	−2.12%
1990	324	−0.60%
1999	306	−0.63%
2007	313	+0.28%
2012	325	+0.76%
2017	301	−1.52%
2023	331	+1.60%
Source: INSEE

== See also ==
- Communes of the Meurthe-et-Moselle department
- Parc naturel régional de Lorraine
