= Essey-et-Maizerais =

- Commune
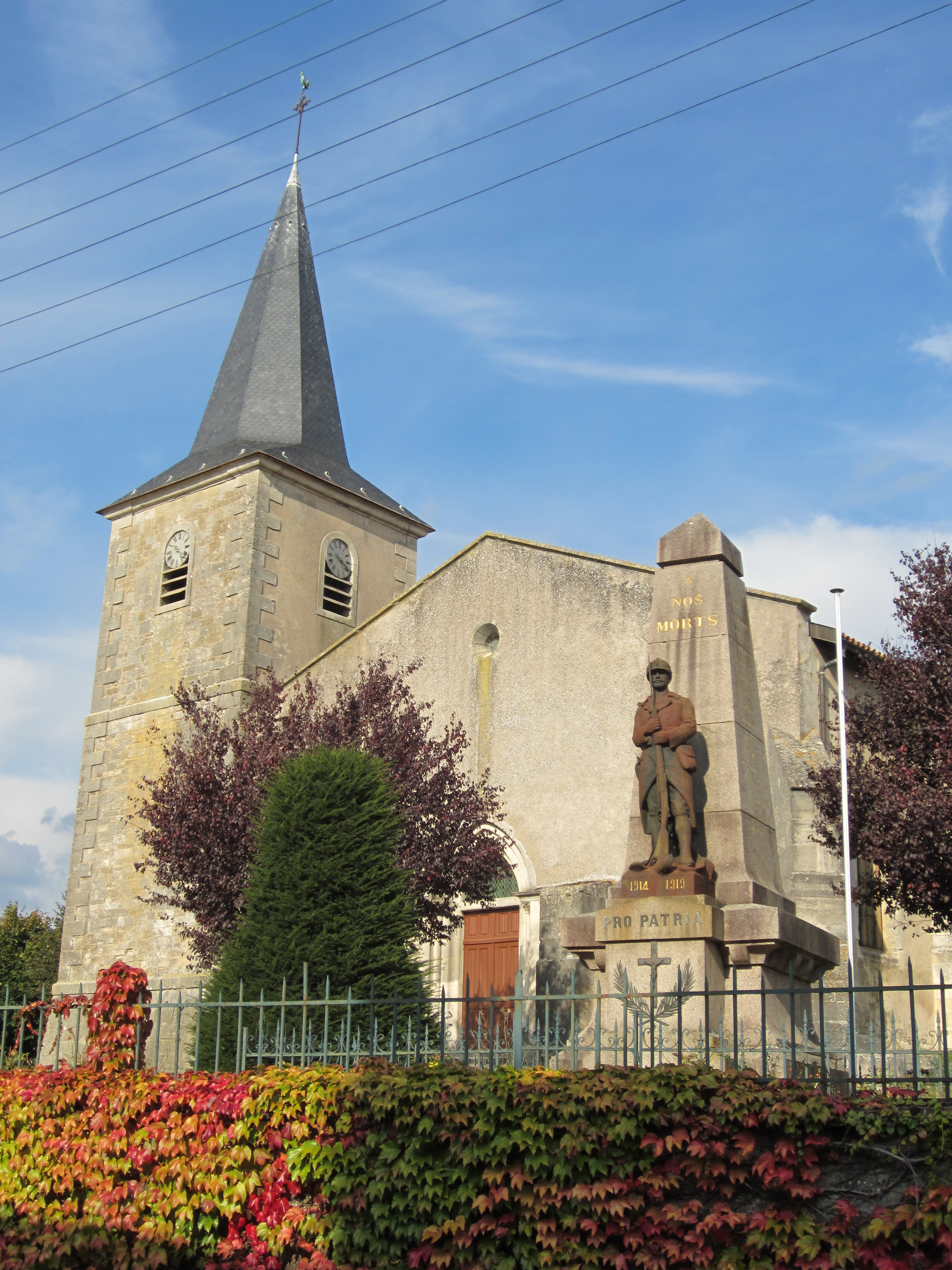
- The church in Essey-et-Maizerais

- Coat of arms
- Location of Essey-et-Maizerais
- Location within France Location within Grand Est
- Coordinates: 48°55′12″N 5°48′42″E
- Country: France
- Region: Grand Est
- Department: Meurthe-et-Moselle
- Arrondissement: Toul
- Canton: Le Nord-Toulois
- Intercommunality: Mad et Moselle

Government
  - Mayor (2020–2026): Gérald Petitjean
- Area^{1}: 13.02 km^{2} (5.03 sq mi)
- Elevation: 212 m (696 ft)
- Highest elevation: 286 m (938 ft)
- Lowest elevation: 213 m (699 ft)
- Population (2023): 339
  - Density: 26.0/km^{2} (67.4/sq mi)
- Time zone: UTC+01:00 (CET)
  - Summer (DST): UTC+02:00 (CEST)
- INSEE/Postal code: 54182 /54470
- ^{1} French Land Register data, which excludes lakes, ponds, glaciers > 1 km^{2} (0.386 sq mi or 247 acres) and river estuaries.

Essey-et-Maizerais (French pronunciation: [esɛ e mɛzʁɛ]) is a commune in the Meurthe-et-Moselle department in north-eastern France.

== Geography ==
The Rupt de Mad flows northeastward through the middle of the commune.

== See also ==
- Communes of the Meurthe-et-Moselle department
- Parc naturel régional de Lorraine
