= Beney (surname) =

Beney is a surname. Notable people with the surname include:

- Bert Beney (1883–1915), English footballer
- Iman Beney (b. 2006), Swiss footballer
- Nicolas Beney (b. 1980), Swiss footballer
- Noémie Beney (b. 1985), Swiss footballer
- Roméo Beney (b. 2005), Swiss footballer

Other

- Beney-en-Woëvre, commune in the Grand Est region in northeastern France
- Mount Beney, the largest of the La Grange Nunataks
