= Arnaville =

- Commune
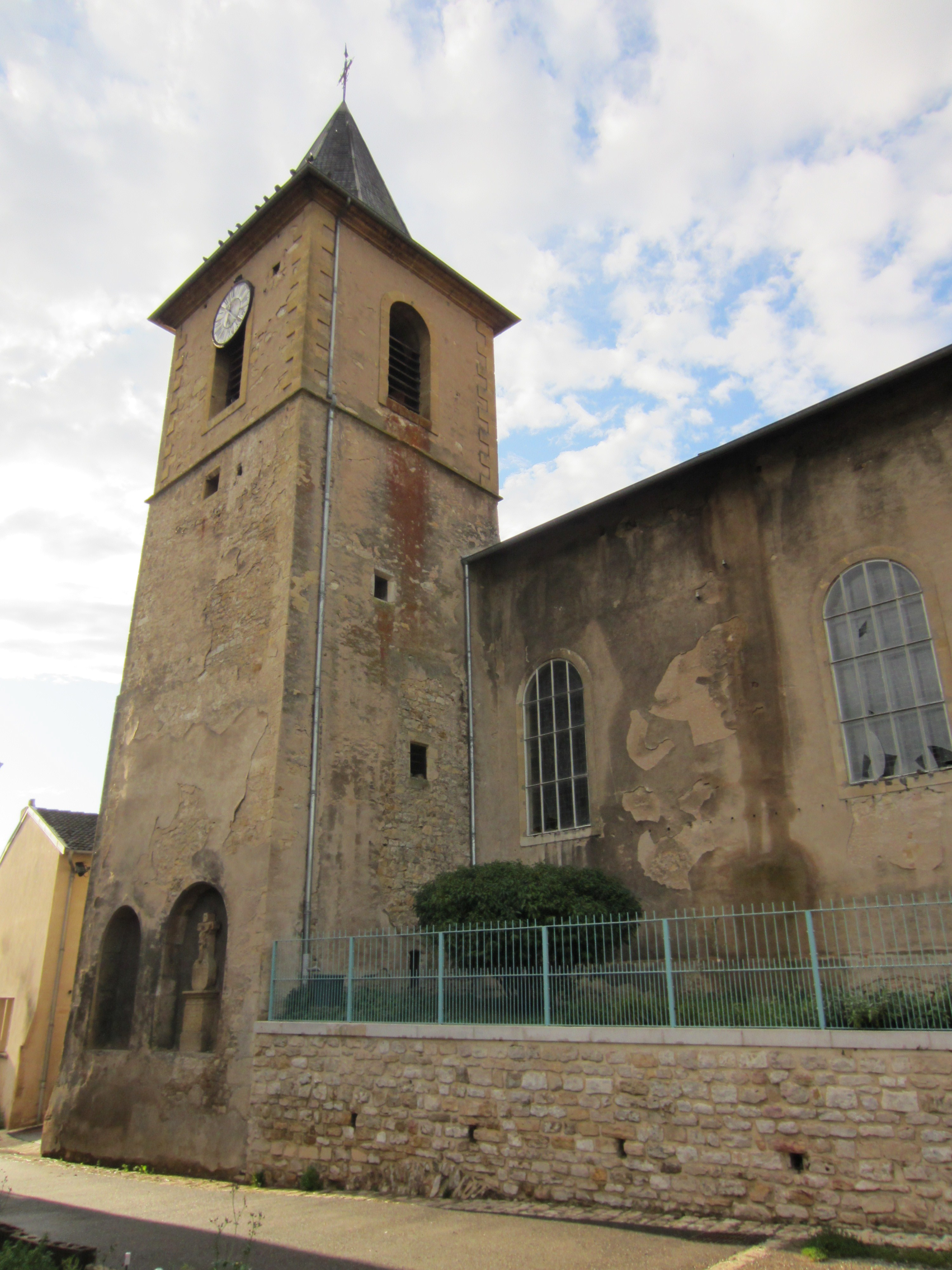
- The church in Arnaville

- Coat of arms
- Location of Arnaville
- Location within France Location within Grand Est
- Coordinates: 49°00′43″N 6°01′52″E
- Country: France
- Region: Grand Est
- Department: Meurthe-et-Moselle
- Arrondissement: Toul
- Canton: Pont-à-Mousson
- Intercommunality: CC Mad Moselle

Government
  - Mayor (2020–2026): René Cailloux
- Area^{1}: 5.22 km^{2} (2.02 sq mi)
- Elevation: 200 m (660 ft)
- Highest elevation: 354 m (1,161 ft)
- Lowest elevation: 171 m (561 ft)
- Population (2023): 556
  - Density: 107/km^{2} (276/sq mi)
- Time zone: UTC+01:00 (CET)
  - Summer (DST): UTC+02:00 (CEST)
- INSEE/Postal code: 54022 /54530
- ^{1} French Land Register data, which excludes lakes, ponds, glaciers > 1 km^{2} (0.386 sq mi or 247 acres) and river estuaries.

Arnaville (French pronunciation: [aʁnavil]) is a commune in the Meurthe-et-Moselle department in northeastern France.

== Geography ==
The village lies on the left bank of the Rupt de Mad, which flows southeast through the middle of the commune, then flows into the Moselle, which forms the commune's eastern border.

== Population ==
Historical population
| Year | Pop. | ±% p.a. |
|---|---|---|
| 1968 | 663 | — |
| 1975 | 640 | −0.50% |
| 1982 | 583 | −1.32% |
| 1990 | 597 | +0.30% |
| 1999 | 609 | +0.22% |
| 2007 | 583 | −0.54% |
| 2012 | 626 | +1.43% |
| 2017 | 565 | −2.03% |
| 2023 | 556 | −0.27% |
Source: INSEE

== Personalities ==
It is the birthplace of French composer and conductor André Amellér.

== See also ==
- Communes of the Meurthe-et-Moselle department
- Parc naturel régional de Lorraine
