= Vandelainville =

- Commune
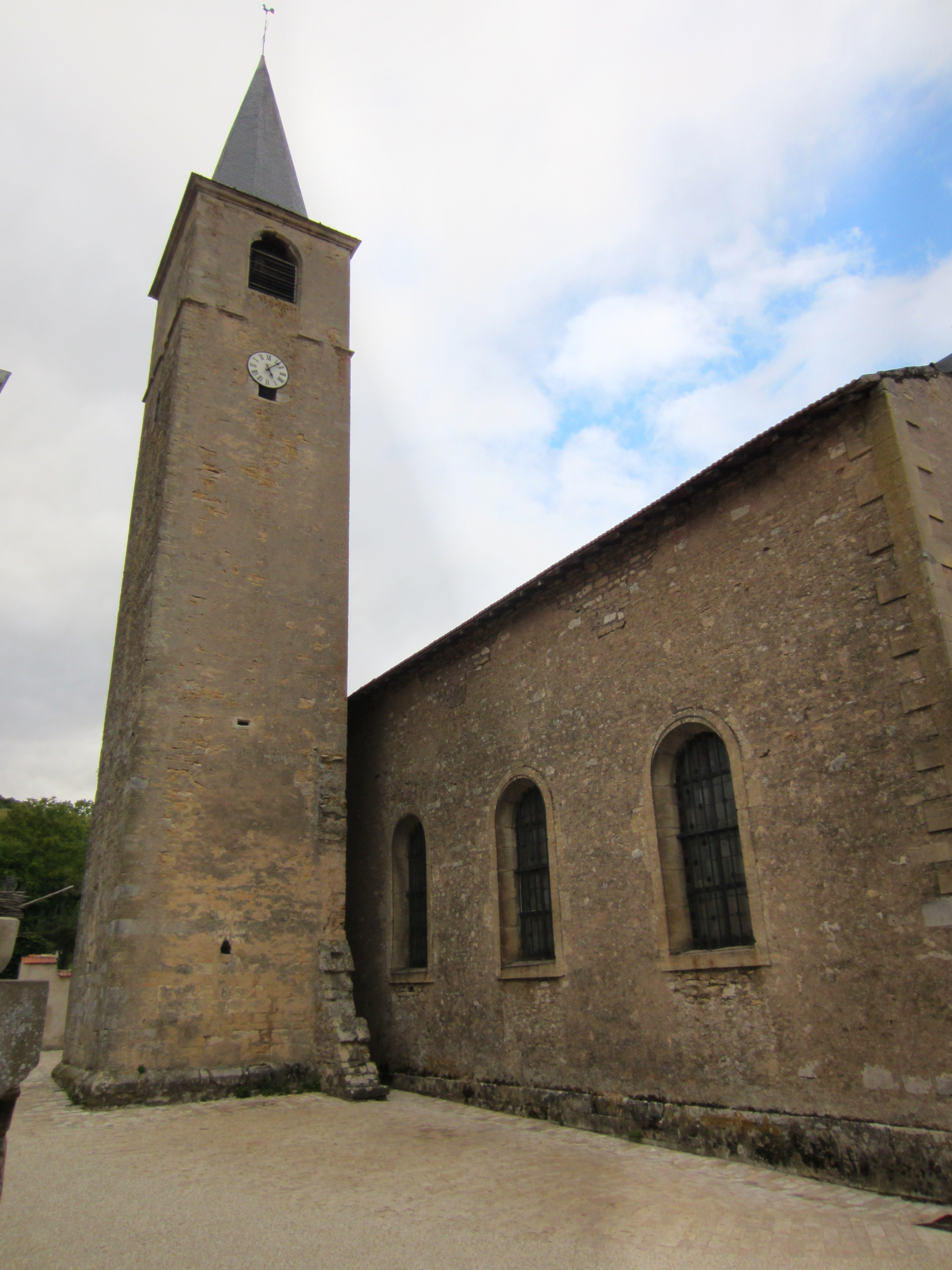
- The church in Vandelainville

- Coat of arms
- Location of Vandelainville
- Location within France Location within Grand Est
- Coordinates: 49°01′03″N 5°58′38″E
- Country: France
- Region: Grand Est
- Department: Meurthe-et-Moselle
- Arrondissement: Toul
- Canton: Pont-à-Mousson
- Intercommunality: Mad et Moselle

Government
  - Mayor (2020–2026): Jean-Louis Depierreux
- Area^{1}: 1.36 km^{2} (0.53 sq mi)
- Elevation: 195 m (640 ft)
- Highest elevation: 366 m (1,201 ft)
- Lowest elevation: 182 m (597 ft)
- Population (2023): 144
  - Density: 106/km^{2} (274/sq mi)
- Time zone: UTC+01:00 (CET)
  - Summer (DST): UTC+02:00 (CEST)
- INSEE/Postal code: 54544 /54890
- ^{1} French Land Register data, which excludes lakes, ponds, glaciers > 1 km^{2} (0.386 sq mi or 247 acres) and river estuaries.

Vandelainville (French pronunciation: [vɑ̃dlɛ̃vil]) is a commune in the Meurthe-et-Moselle department in north-eastern France.

== Geography ==
The village lies on the left bank of the Rupt de Mad, which forms most of the commune's southern border.

== See also ==
- Communes of the Meurthe-et-Moselle department
- Parc naturel régional de Lorraine
