= Pannes, Meurthe-et-Moselle =

Pannes
- Commune
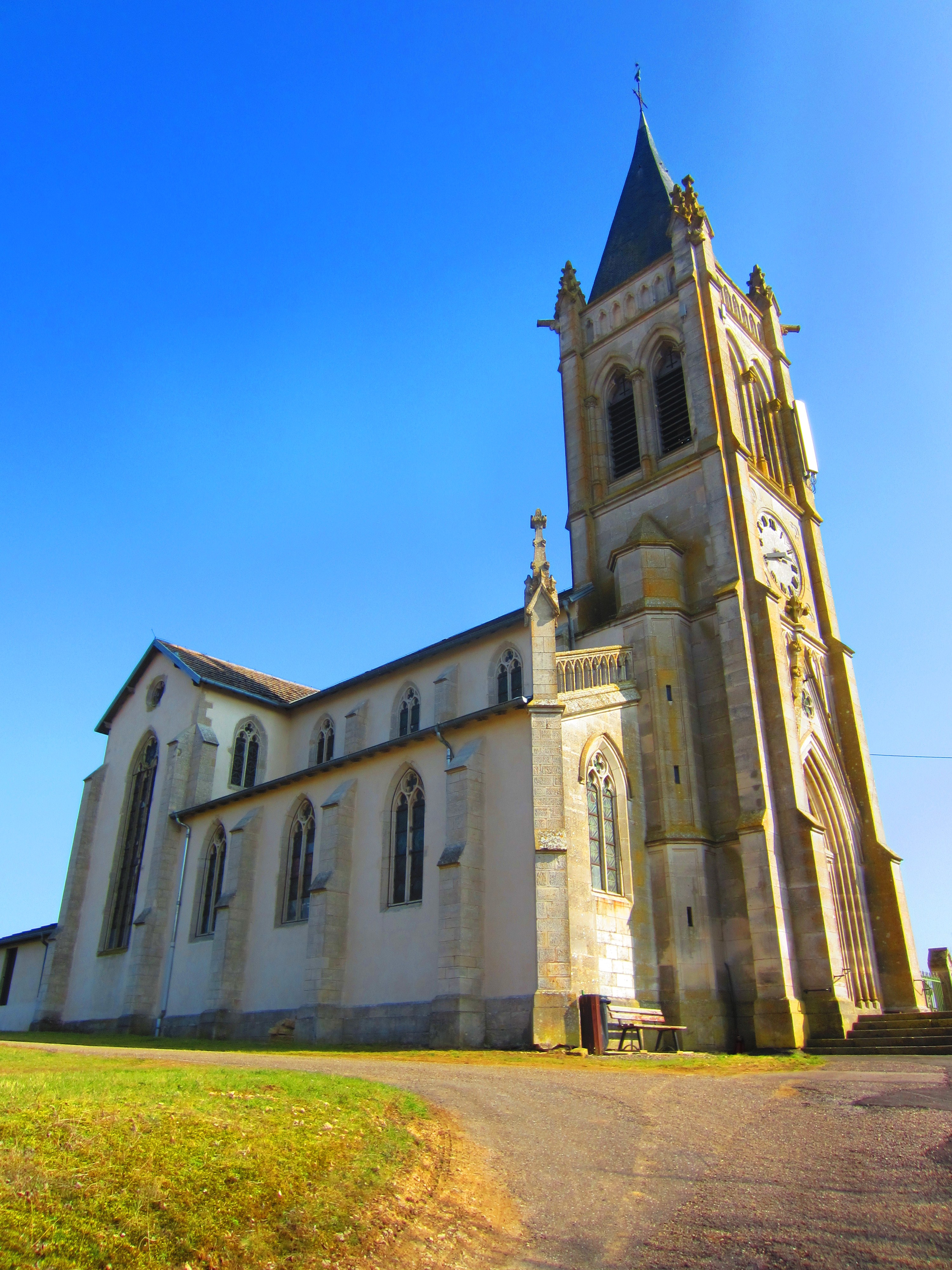
- The church in Pannes

- Coat of arms
- Location of Pannes
- Location within France Location within Grand Est
- Coordinates: 48°55′59″N 5°48′09″E
- Country: France
- Region: Grand Est
- Department: Meurthe-et-Moselle
- Arrondissement: Toul
- Canton: Le Nord-Toulois
- Intercommunality: Mad et Moselle

Government
  - Mayor (2020–2026): Gérald Brady
- Area^{1}: 8.37 km^{2} (3.23 sq mi)
- Elevation: 217 m (712 ft)
- Highest elevation: 249 m (817 ft)
- Lowest elevation: 210 m (690 ft)
- Population (2023): 172
  - Density: 20.5/km^{2} (53.2/sq mi)
- Time zone: UTC+01:00 (CET)
  - Summer (DST): UTC+02:00 (CEST)
- INSEE/Postal code: 54416 /54470
- ^{1} French Land Register data, which excludes lakes, ponds, glaciers > 1 km^{2} (0.386 sq mi or 247 acres) and river estuaries.

Pannes (French pronunciation: [pan]) is a commune in the Meurthe-et-Moselle department in north-eastern France.

== Geography ==
The village lies in the middle of the commune, on the left bank of the Madine, a stream, tributary of the Rupt de Mad, which forms part of the commune's south-eastern border.

== See also ==
- Communes of the Meurthe-et-Moselle department
- Parc naturel régional de Lorraine
