= Jaulny =

- Commune
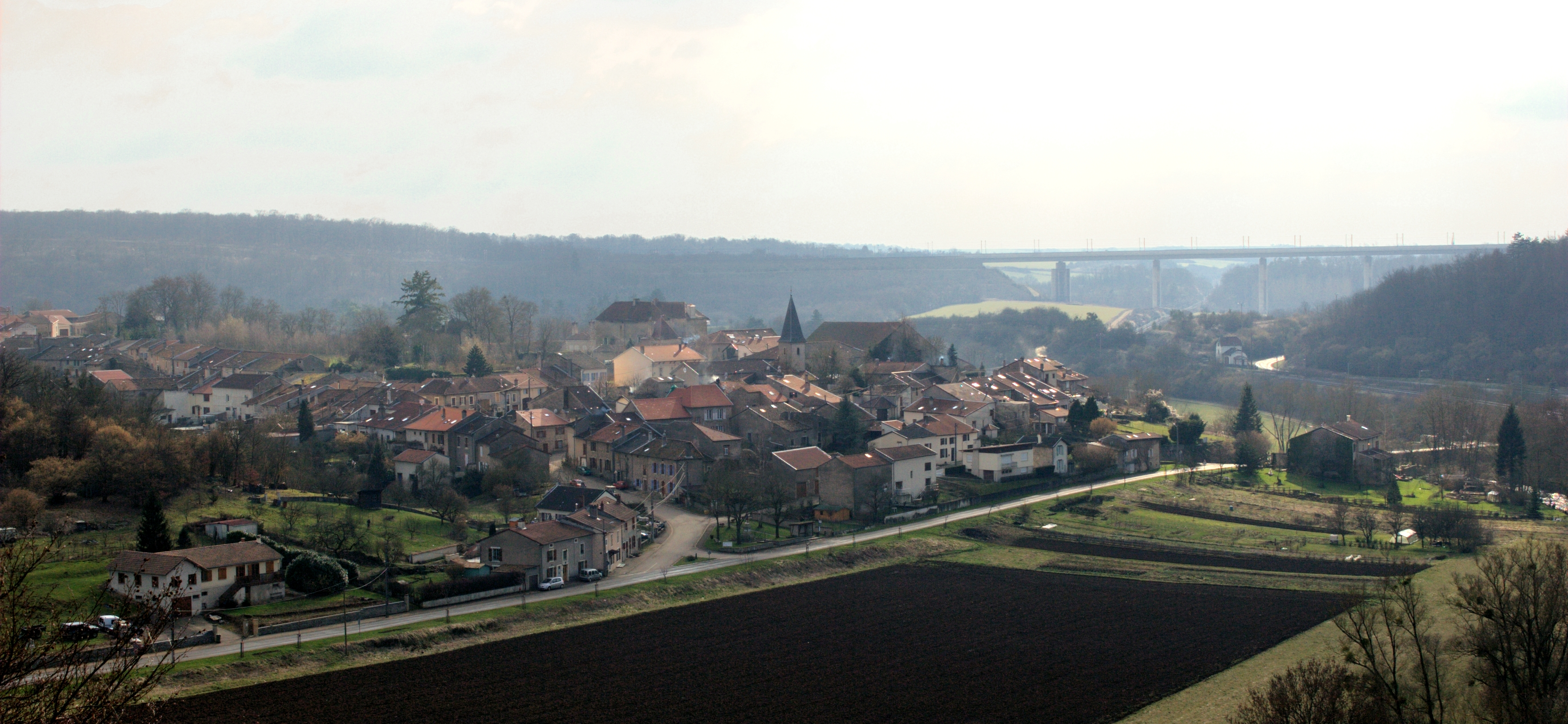
- Jaulny, seen from next to the Hailbat virgin. In the background: the viaduct of the LGV-Est

- Coat of arms
- Location of Jaulny
- Location within France Location within Grand Est
- Coordinates: 48°58′18″N 5°53′15″E
- Country: France
- Region: Grand Est
- Department: Meurthe-et-Moselle
- Arrondissement: Toul
- Canton: Le Nord-Toulois
- Intercommunality: Mad et Moselle

Government
  - Mayor (2020–2026): Corinne Halteur
- Area^{1}: 8.25 km^{2} (3.19 sq mi)
- Elevation: 200 m (660 ft)
- Highest elevation: 318 m (1,043 ft)
- Lowest elevation: 194 m (636 ft)
- Population (2023): 220
  - Density: 27/km^{2} (69/sq mi)
- Demonym: Jaulnois(e)s
- Time zone: UTC+01:00 (CET)
  - Summer (DST): UTC+02:00 (CEST)
- INSEE/Postal code: 54275 /54470
- ^{1} French Land Register data, which excludes lakes, ponds, glaciers > 1 km^{2} (0.386 sq mi or 247 acres) and river estuaries.

Jaulny (French pronunciation: [ʒo(l)ni]) is a commune in the Meurthe-et-Moselle department in north-eastern France.

== Geography ==
The village lies in the middle of the commune, on the right bank of the Rupt de Mad, which flows northward through the commune.

== See also ==
- Communes of the Meurthe-et-Moselle department
- Parc naturel régional de Lorraine
