= Saint-Baussant =

- Commune
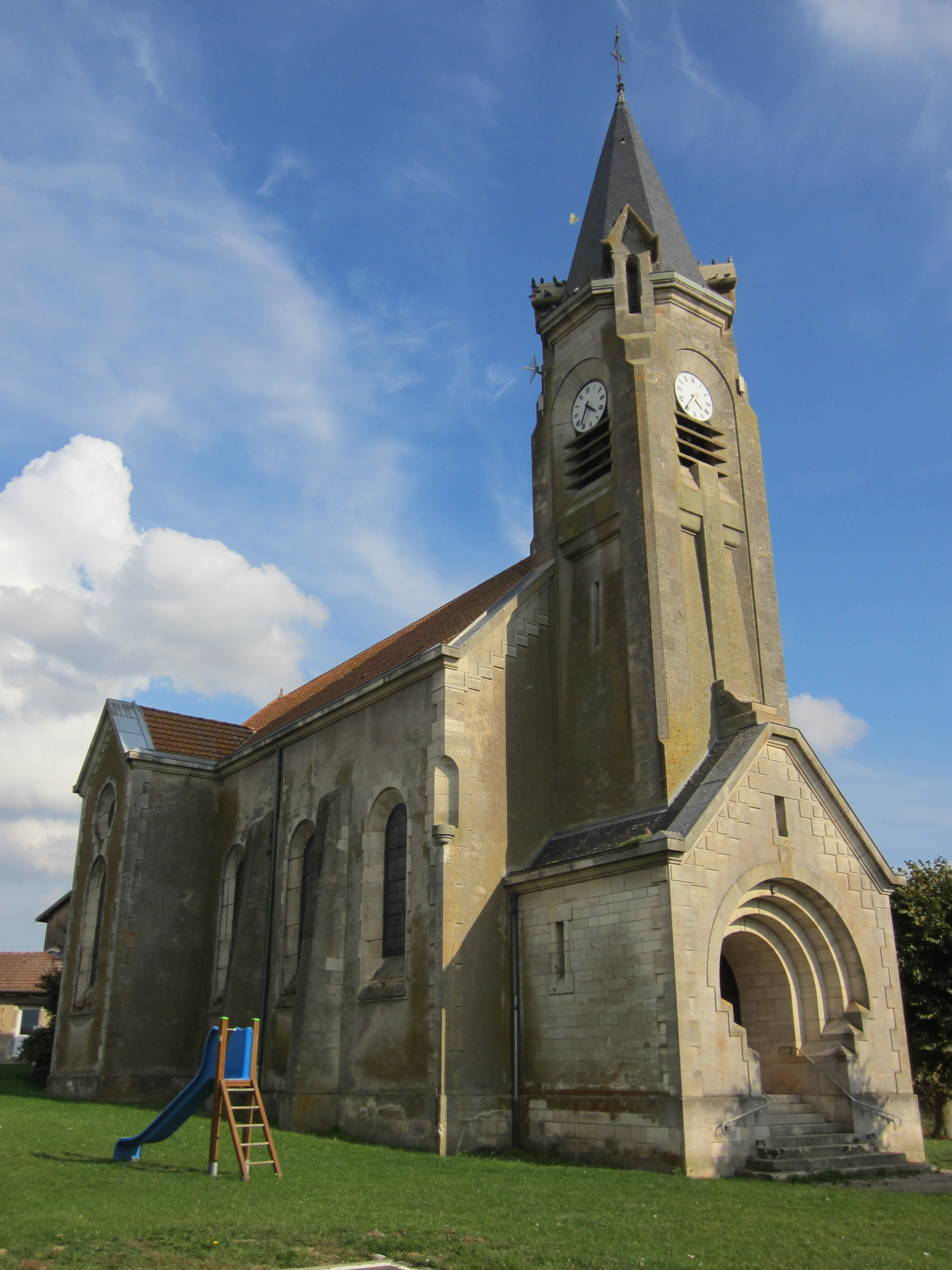
- The church in Saint-Baussant

- Coat of arms
- Location of Saint-Baussant
- Location within France Location within Grand Est
- Coordinates: 48°53′36″N 5°47′34″E
- Country: France
- Region: Grand Est
- Department: Meurthe-et-Moselle
- Arrondissement: Toul
- Canton: Le Nord-Toulois
- Intercommunality: Mad et Moselle

Government
  - Mayor (2020–2026): Didier Merchat
- Area^{1}: 8.92 km^{2} (3.44 sq mi)
- Elevation: 230 m (750 ft)
- Highest elevation: 297 m (974 ft)
- Lowest elevation: 217 m (712 ft)
- Population (2023): 60
  - Density: 6.7/km^{2} (17/sq mi)
- Time zone: UTC+01:00 (CET)
  - Summer (DST): UTC+02:00 (CEST)
- INSEE/Postal code: 54470 /54470
- ^{1} French Land Register data, which excludes lakes, ponds, glaciers > 1 km^{2} (0.386 sq mi or 247 acres) and river estuaries.

Saint-Baussant (French pronunciation: [sɛ̃ bosɑ̃]) is a commune in the Meurthe-et-Moselle department in north-eastern France.

It was formerly known as Saint-Baussonne, ultimately from Sanctus Balsamus.

The Rupt de Mad flows northeastward through the middle of the commune and forms part of its northern border.

== See also ==
- Communes of the Meurthe-et-Moselle department
