= Rembercourt-sur-Mad =

- Commune
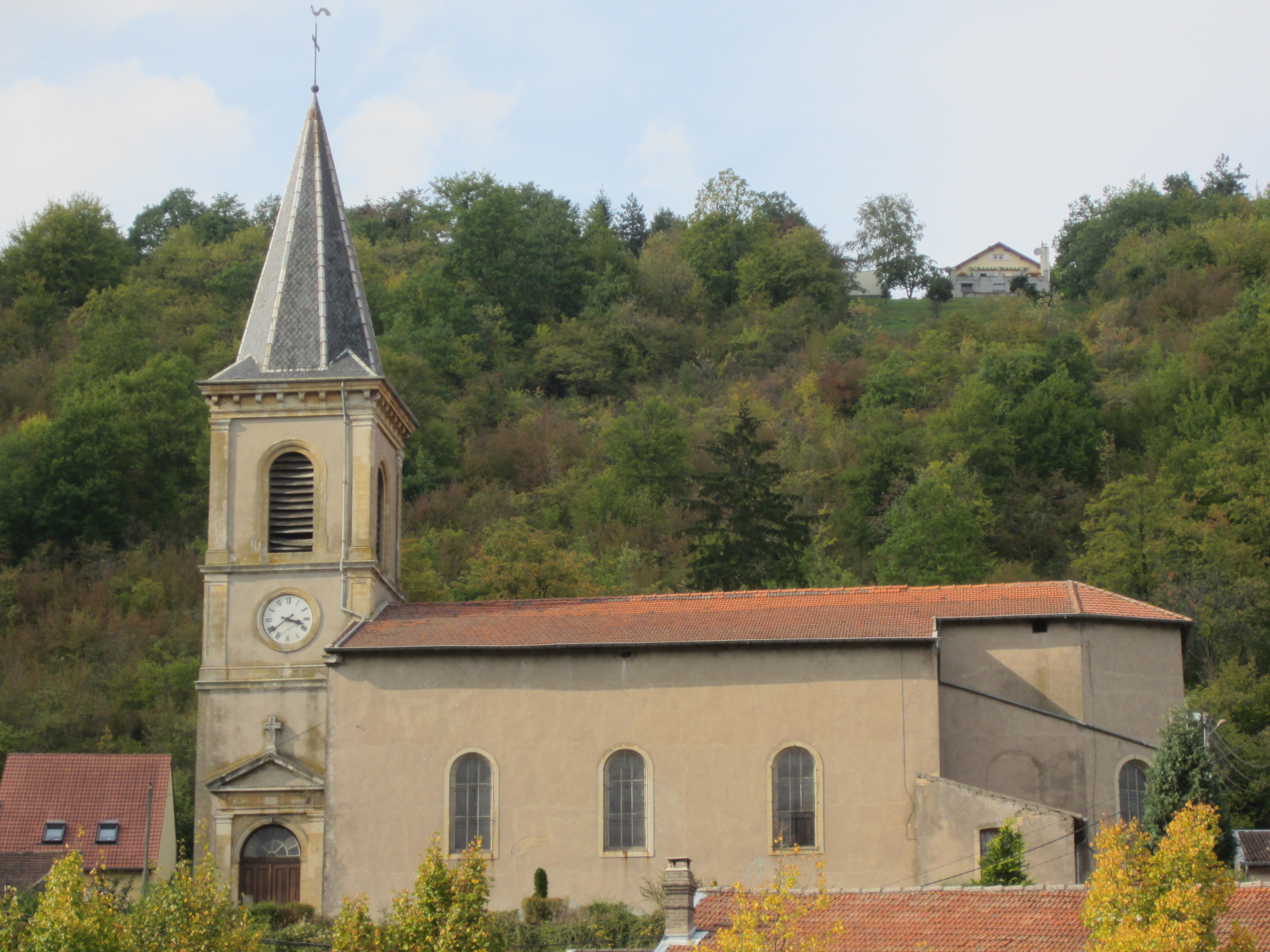
- The church in Rembercourt-sur-Mad

- Coat of arms
- Location of Rembercourt-sur-Mad
- Location within France Location within Grand Est
- Coordinates: 48°59′17″N 5°54′14″E
- Country: France
- Region: Grand Est
- Department: Meurthe-et-Moselle
- Arrondissement: Toul
- Canton: Le Nord-Toulois
- Intercommunality: Mad et Moselle

Government
  - Mayor (2020–2026): Jocelin Cavagni
- Area^{1}: 5.04 km^{2} (1.95 sq mi)
- Highest elevation: 322 m (1,056 ft)
- Lowest elevation: 192 m (630 ft)
- Population (2023): 164
  - Density: 32.5/km^{2} (84.3/sq mi)
- Time zone: UTC+01:00 (CET)
  - Summer (DST): UTC+02:00 (CEST)
- INSEE/Postal code: 54453 /54470
- ^{1} French Land Register data, which excludes lakes, ponds, glaciers > 1 km^{2} (0.386 sq mi or 247 acres) and river estuaries.

Rembercourt-sur-Mad (French pronunciation: [ʁɑ̃bɛʁkuʁ syʁ mad], literally Rembercourt on Mad) is a commune in the Meurthe-et-Moselle department in Grand Est in northeastern France.

== Geography ==
The Rupt de Mad flows northeastward through the commune and crosses the village.

== See also ==
- Communes of the Meurthe-et-Moselle department
- Parc naturel régional de Lorraine
