= Euvezin =

- Commune
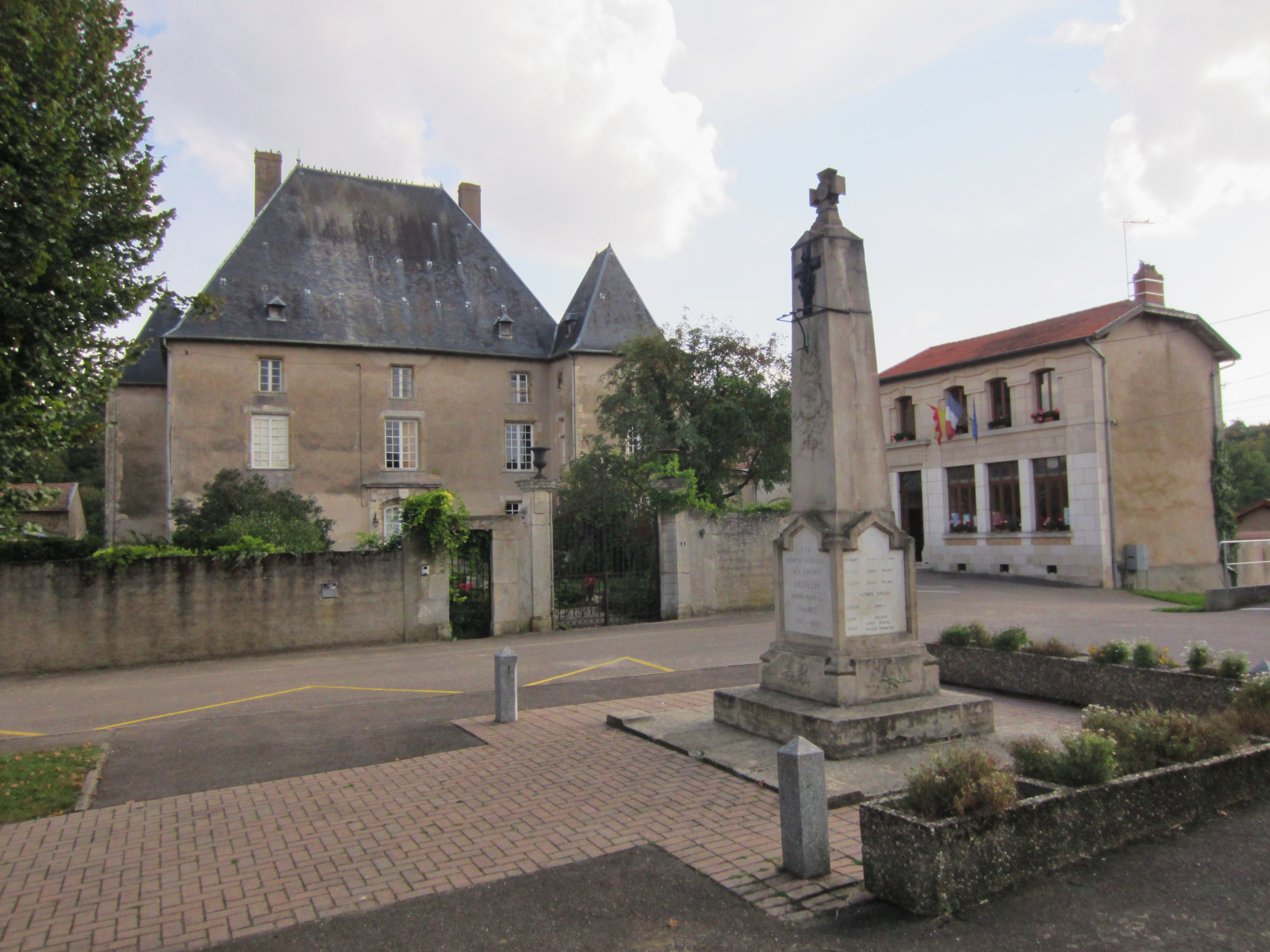
- The main square in Euvezin

- Coat of arms
- Location of Euvezin
- Location within France Location within Grand Est
- Coordinates: 48°55′29″N 5°50′20″E
- Country: France
- Region: Grand Est
- Department: Meurthe-et-Moselle
- Arrondissement: Toul
- Canton: Le Nord-Toulois
- Intercommunality: Mad et Moselle

Government
  - Mayor (2020–2026): Sabine Parmentelot
- Area^{1}: 11.28 km^{2} (4.36 sq mi)
- Elevation: 213 m (699 ft)
- Highest elevation: 328 m (1,076 ft)
- Lowest elevation: 208 m (682 ft)
- Population (2023): 107
  - Density: 9.49/km^{2} (24.6/sq mi)
- Time zone: UTC+01:00 (CET)
  - Summer (DST): UTC+02:00 (CEST)
- INSEE/Postal code: 54187 /54470
- ^{1} French Land Register data, which excludes lakes, ponds, glaciers > 1 km^{2} (0.386 sq mi or 247 acres) and river estuaries.

Euvezin (French pronunciation: [øv(ə)zɛ̃]) is a commune in the Meurthe-et-Moselle department in north-eastern France.

== Geography ==
The village lies on the left bank of the Rupt de Mad, which flows northeastward through the north-western part of the commune.

== See also ==
- Communes of the Meurthe-et-Moselle department
- Parc naturel régional de Lorraine
