= Bouillonville =

- Commune
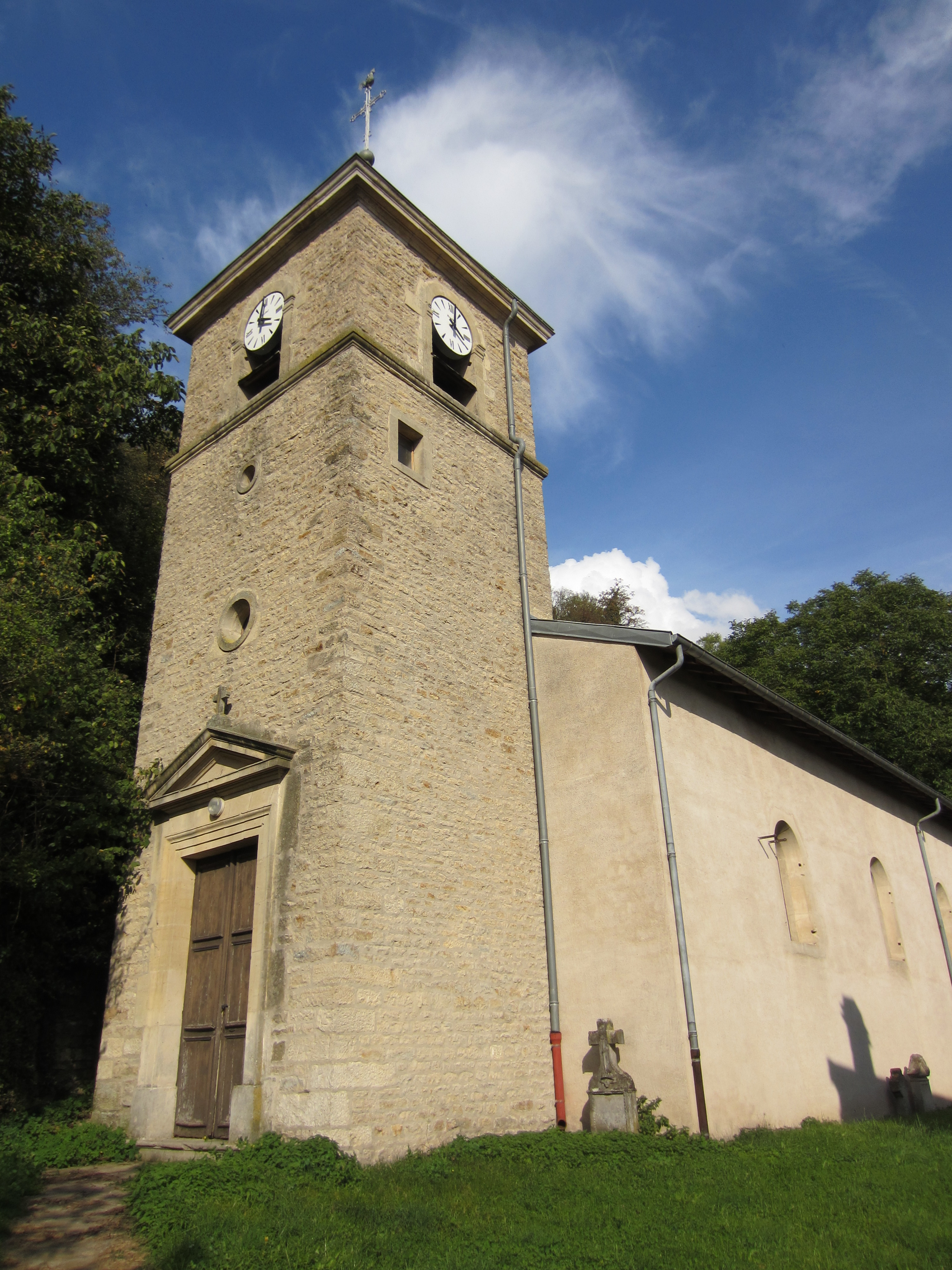
- The church in Bouillonville

- Coat of arms
- Location of Bouillonville
- Location within France Location within Grand Est
- Coordinates: 48°56′43″N 5°50′35″E
- Country: France
- Region: Grand Est
- Department: Meurthe-et-Moselle
- Arrondissement: Toul
- Canton: Le Nord-Toulois

Government
  - Mayor (2020–2026): Gérard Renouard
- Area^{1}: 5.32 km^{2} (2.05 sq mi)
- Elevation: 209 m (686 ft)
- Highest elevation: 264 m (866 ft)
- Lowest elevation: 205 m (673 ft)
- Population (2023): 145
  - Density: 27.3/km^{2} (70.6/sq mi)
- Time zone: UTC+01:00 (CET)
  - Summer (DST): UTC+02:00 (CEST)
- INSEE/Postal code: 54087 /54470
- ^{1} French Land Register data, which excludes lakes, ponds, glaciers > 1 km^{2} (0.386 sq mi or 247 acres) and river estuaries.

Bouillonville (French pronunciation: [bujɔ̃vil]) is a commune in the Meurthe-et-Moselle department in northeastern France.

== Geography ==
The village lies on the left bank of the Rupt de Mad, which flows north through the middle of the commune.

== Population ==
Historical population
Year	Pop.	±% p.a.
1968	102	—
1975	85	−2.57%
1982	76	−1.59%
1990	80	+0.64%
1999	91	+1.44%
2007	109	+2.28%
2012	128	+3.27%
2017	156	+4.04%
2023	145	−1.21%
Source: INSEE

== Sights ==
- The German war cemetery, where rest 1,368 German soldiers from World War I.

== See also ==
- Communes of the Meurthe-et-Moselle department
- Parc naturel régional de Lorraine
