= Canton of Lunéville-Nord =

Former canton in Meurthe-et-Moselle, France

Coordinates: 48°35′47″N 6°28′08″E

- Former canton
- Location of the canton in the arrondissement of Lunéville
- Country: France
- Region: Grand Est
- Department: Meurthe-et-Moselle
- No. of communes: {{{nbcomm}}}
- Disbanded: 2015

Government
  - Representatives: Grégory Grandjean
- Population (2012): 13,297

The canton of Lunéville-Nord (French: Canton de Lunéville-Nord) is a former French canton located in the department of Meurthe-et-Moselle in the Lorraine region (now part of Grand Est). This canton was organized around Lunéville in the arrondissement of Lunéville. It is now part of the canton of Lunéville-1.

The last general councillor from this canton was Grégory Grandjean (PS), elected in 2011.

== Composition ==
The canton of Lunéville-Nord grouped together a part of Lunéville and 18 other municipalities and had 13,297 inhabitants (2012 census without double counts).

1. Anthelupt
2. Bauzemont
3. Bienville-la-Petite
4. Bonviller
5. Courbesseaux
6. Crévic
7. Deuxville
8. Drouville
9. Einville-au-Jard
10. Flainval
11. Hoéville
12. Hudiviller
13. Lunéville (partly)
14. Maixe
15. Raville-sur-Sânon
16. Serres
17. Sommerviller
18. Valhey
19. Vitrimont
