= Canton of Lunéville-Sud =

Former canton in Meurthe-et-Moselle, France

Coordinates: 48°39′55″N 6°31′55″E

- Former canton
- Location of the canton in the arrondissement of Lunéville
- Country: France
- Region: Grand Est
- Department: Meurthe-et-Moselle
- No. of communes: {{{nbcomm}}}
- Disbanded: 2015

Government
  - Representatives: Michel Baumont
- Population (2012): 22,669

The canton of Lunéville-Sud (French: Canton de Lunéville-Sud) is a former French canton located in the department of Meurthe-et-Moselle in the Lorraine region (now part of Grand Est). This canton was organized around Lunéville in the arrondissement of Lunéville. It is now part of the canton of Lunéville-2.

The last general councillor from this canton was Michel Baumont (DVD), elected in 2008.

== Composition ==
The canton of Lunéville-Sud grouped together a part of Lunéville and 17 other municipalities and had 22,669 inhabitants (2012 census without double counts).

1. Bénaménil
2. Chanteheux
3. Chenevières
4. Crion
5. Croismare
6. Hénaménil
7. Hériménil
8. Jolivet
9. Laneuveville-aux-Bois
10. Laronxe
11. Lunéville (partly)
12. Manonviller
13. Marainviller
14. Moncel-lès-Lunéville
15. Saint-Clément
16. Sionviller
17. Thiébauménil
