= Jolivet (disambiguation) =

Jolivet may refer to:

- Jolivet, Meurthe-et-Moselle, a commune in Meurthe-et-Moselle, France
- André Jolivet (1905–1974), French composer
- Pierre Jolivet (born 1952), French film director, actor, scriptwriter
