= Dombasle-sur-Meurthe =

- Commune
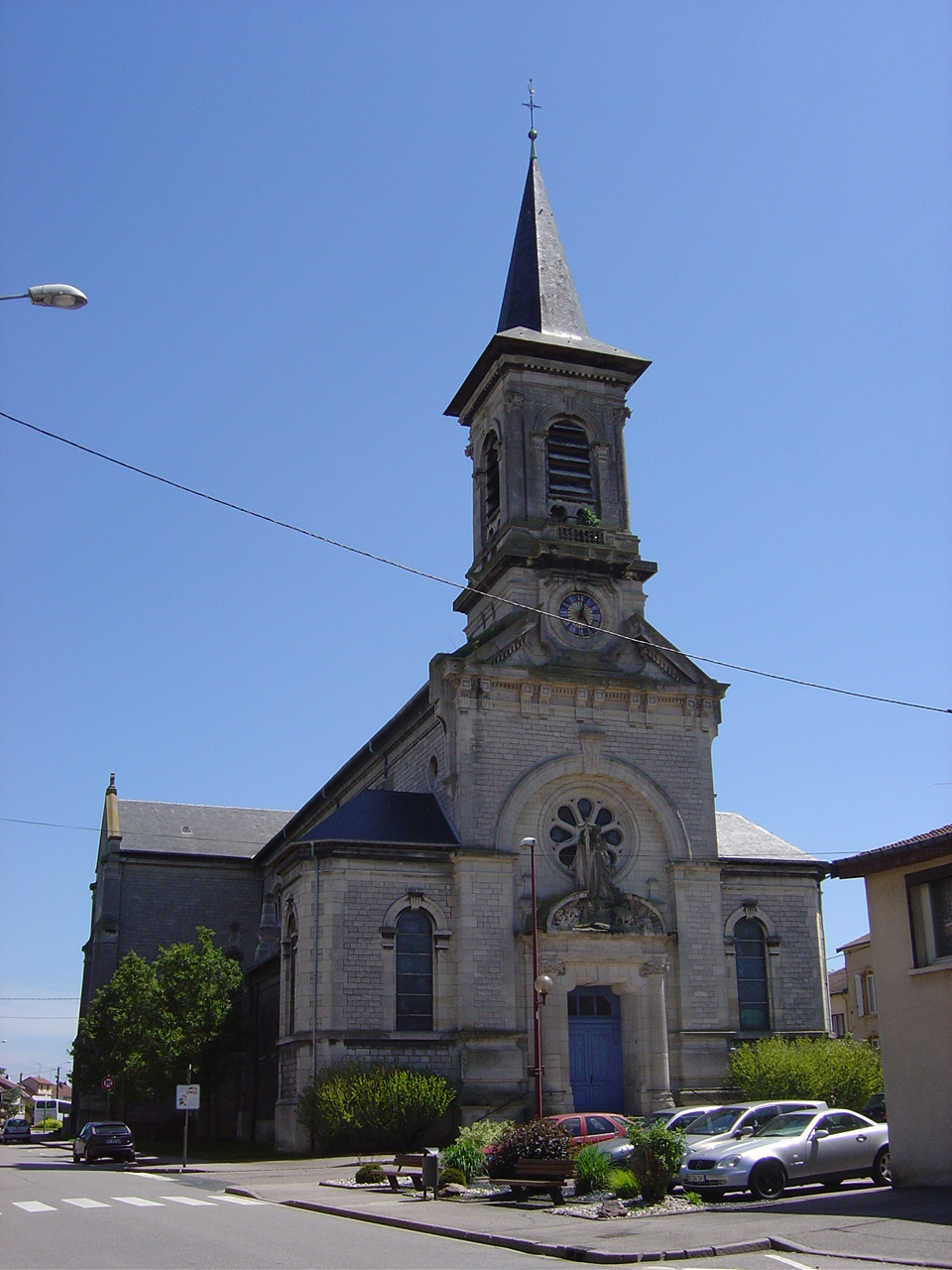
- Saint Basle church

- Coat of arms
- Location of Dombasle-sur-Meurthe
- Location within France Location within Grand Est
- Coordinates: 48°37′32″N 6°21′02″E
- Country: France
- Region: Grand Est
- Department: Meurthe-et-Moselle
- Arrondissement: Nancy
- Canton: Lunéville-1
- Intercommunality: CC des Pays du Sel et du Vermois

Government
  - Mayor (2020–2026): David Fischer
- Area^{1}: 11.21 km^{2} (4.33 sq mi)
- Elevation: 216 m (709 ft)
- Highest elevation: 320 m (1,050 ft)
- Lowest elevation: 203 m (666 ft)
- Population (2023): 9,424
  - Density: 840.7/km^{2} (2,177/sq mi)
- Time zone: UTC+01:00 (CET)
  - Summer (DST): UTC+02:00 (CEST)
- INSEE/Postal code: 54159 /54110
- Website: www.ville-dombasle.fr
- ^{1} French Land Register data, which excludes lakes, ponds, glaciers > 1 km^{2} (0.386 sq mi or 247 acres) and river estuaries.

Dombasle-sur-Meurthe (French pronunciation: [dɔ̃bal syʁ mœʁt], literally Dombasle on Meurthe) is a commune in the Meurthe-et-Moselle department in north-eastern France, close to the city of Nancy.

== History ==
Dombasle is one of the main production sites for sodium carbonate in the world, as Solvay created there in 1873 one of its oldest production plants. This sodium bicarbonate production plant is a key economic actor in Nancy region. The remains of the castle were destroyed in 1963.

== Population ==
Historical population
Year	Pop.	±% p.a.
1968	9,469	—
1975	10,027	+0.82%
1982	9,474	−0.81%
1990	9,133	−0.46%
1999	8,950	−0.22%
2007	9,716	+1.03%
2012	9,889	+0.35%
2017	9,734	−0.32%
2023	9,424	−0.54%
Source: INSEE

== See also ==
- Communes of the Meurthe-et-Moselle department

== Gallery ==
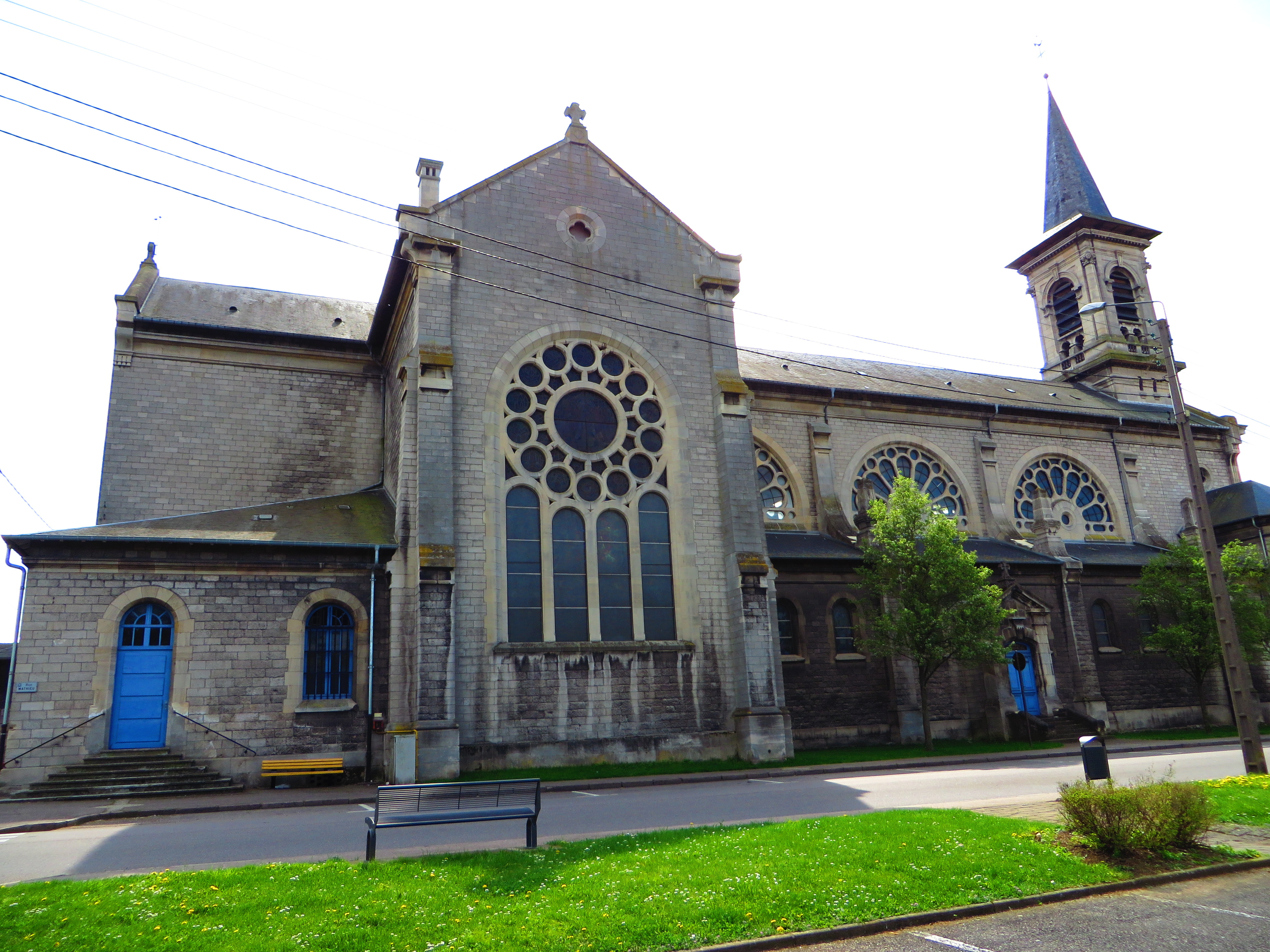
Eglise Saint-Basle

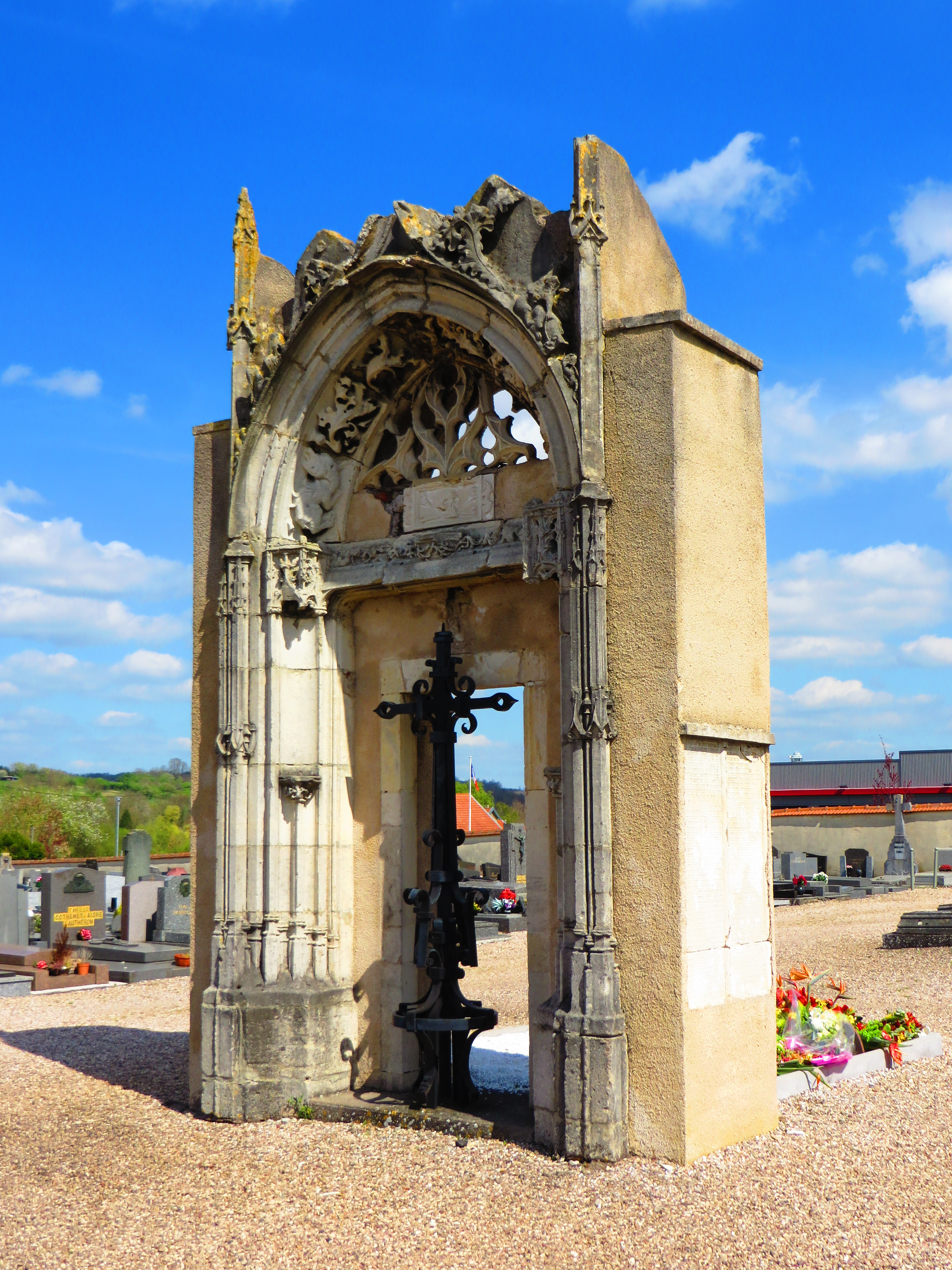
Ancient church

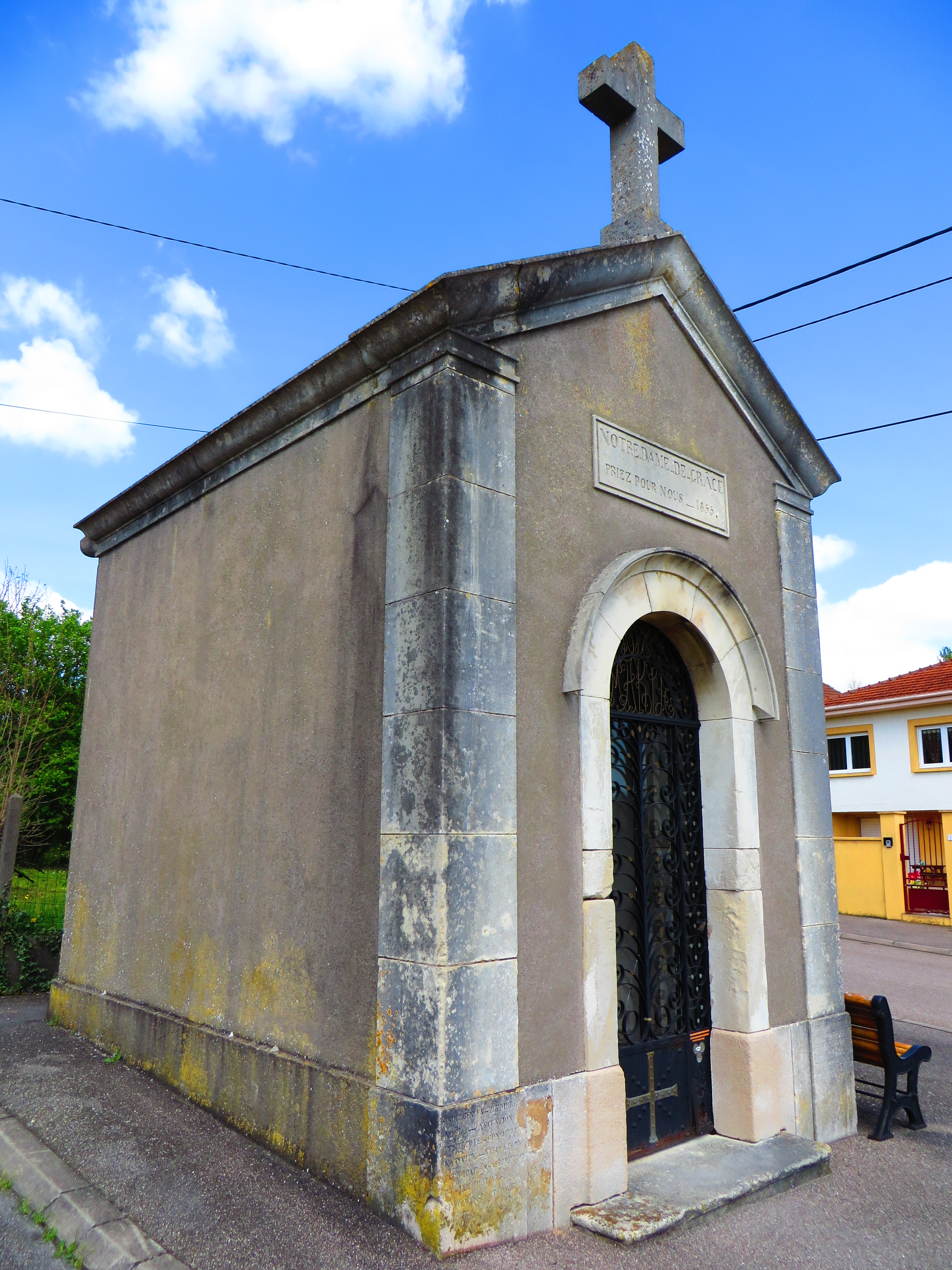
Chapelle
