= Communes of the Meurthe-et-Moselle department =

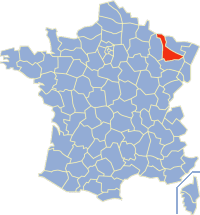

The following is a list of the 591 communes of the Meurthe-et-Moselle department of France.

The communes cooperate in the following intercommunalities (as of 2025):

- Métropole du Grand Nancy
- Communauté d'agglomération Grand Longwy Agglomération
- Communauté d'agglomération de Saint-Dié-des-Vosges (partly)
- Communauté de communes du Bassin de Pompey
- Communauté de communes du Bassin de Pont-à-Mousson
- Communauté de communes Cœur du Pays-Haut (partly)
- Communauté de communes Mad et Moselle (partly)
- Communauté de communes Meurthe, Mortagne, Moselle
- Communauté de communes Moselle et Madon
- Communauté de communes Orne Lorraine Confluences
- Communauté de communes du Pays de Colombey et du Sud Toulois (partly)
- Communauté de communes du Pays Haut Val d'Alzette (partly)
- Communauté de communes du Pays du Saintois
- Communauté de communes du Pays du Sânon
- Communauté de communes des Pays du Sel et du Vermois
- Communauté de communes de Seille et Grand Couronné
- Communauté de communes Terre Lorraine du Longuyonnais
- Communauté de communes Terres Touloises
- Communauté de communes du Territoire de Lunéville à Baccarat
- Communauté de communes de Vezouze en Piémont

INSEE code	Postal code	Commune
54001	54610	Abaucourt
54002	54800	Abbéville-lès-Conflans
54003	54115	Aboncourt
54004	54800	Affléville
54005	54740	Affracourt
54006	54770	Agincourt
54007	54460	Aingeray
54008	54170	Allain
54009	54800	Allamont
54010	54112	Allamps
54011	54260	Allondrelle-la-Malmaison
54012	54770	Amance
54013	54450	Amenoncourt
54014	54450	Ancerviller
54015	54560	Anderny
54016	54200	Andilly
54017	54540	Angomont
54018	54150	Anoux
54019	54470	Ansauville
54020	54110	Anthelupt
54021	54760	Armaucourt
54022	54530	Arnaville
54023	54370	Arracourt
54024	54760	Arraye-et-Han
54025	54510	Art-sur-Meurthe
54026	54370	Athienville
54027	54700	Atton
54028	54580	Auboué
54029	54560	Audun-le-Roman
54030	54450	Autrepierre
54031	54380	Autreville-sur-Moselle
54032	54160	Autrey
54033	54490	Avillers
54034	54385	Avrainville
54035	54450	Avricourt
54036	54150	Avril
54037	54210	Azelot
54038	54122	Azerailles
54039	54120	Baccarat
54040	54540	Badonviller
54041	54170	Bagneux
54042	54290	Bainville-aux-Miroirs
54043	54550	Bainville-sur-Madon
54044	54450	Barbas
54045	54360	Barbonville
54046	54170	Barisey-au-Plain
54047	54170	Barisey-la-Côte
54048	54150	Les Baroches
54049	54620	Baslieux
54050	54370	Bathelémont
54051	54980	Batilly
54052	54115	Battigny
54053	54370	Bauzemont
54054	54290	Bayon
54055	54890	Bayonville-sur-Mad
54056	54620	Bazailles
54057	54470	Beaumont
54058	54800	Béchamps
54059	54610	Belleau
54060	54940	Belleville
54061	54450	Bénaménil
54062	54740	Benney
54063	54470	Bernécourt
54064	54480	Bertrambois
54065	54120	Bertrichamps
54066	54640	Bettainvillers
54067	54620	Beuveille
54068	54115	Beuvezin
54069	54560	Beuvillers
54070	54760	Bey-sur-Seille
54071	54370	Bezange-la-Grande
54072	54380	Bezaumont
54073	54200	Bicqueley
54074	54300	Bienville-la-Petite
54075	54540	Bionville
54076	54360	Blainville-sur-l'Eau
54077	54450	Blâmont
54078	54450	Blémerey
54079	54700	Blénod-lès-Pont-à-Mousson
54080	54113	Blénod-lès-Toul
54557	54840	Bois-de-Haye
54081	54620	Boismont
54082	54800	Boncourt
54083	54300	Bonviller
54085	54290	Borville
54086	54200	Boucq
54087	54470	Bouillonville
54088	54200	Bouvron
54089	54770	Bouxières-aux-Chênes
54090	54136	Bouxières-aux-Dames
54091	54700	Bouxières-sous-Froidmont
54092	54930	Bouzanville
54093	54800	Brainville
54094	54740	Bralleville
54095	54610	Bratte
54096	54190	Bréhain-la-Ville
54097	54540	Bréménil
54098	54290	Brémoncourt
54100	54280	Brin-sur-Seille
54101	54120	Brouville
54102	54200	Bruley
54103	54800	Bruville
54104	54110	Buissoncourt
54105	54113	Bulligny
54106	54370	Bures
54107	54450	Buriville
54108	54210	Burthecourt-aux-Chênes
54109	54134	Ceintrey
54110	54420	Cerville
54111	54230	Chaligny
54112	54890	Chambley-Bussières
54113	54280	Champenoux
54114	54700	Champey-sur-Moselle
54115	54250	Champigneulles
54116	54300	Chanteheux
54117	54330	Chaouilley
54118	54260	Charency-Vezin
54119	54470	Charey
54120	54113	Charmes-la-Côte
54121	54360	Charmois
54122	54200	Chaudeney-sur-Moselle
54123	54230	Chavigny
54124	54450	Chazelles-sur-Albe
54125	54122	Chenevières
54126	54610	Chenicourt
54127	54720	Chenières
54128	54200	Choloy-Ménillot
54129	54480	Cirey-sur-Vezouze
54130	54290	Clayeures
54131	54610	Clémery
54132	54330	Clérey-sur-Brenon
54133	54370	Coincourt
54134	54260	Colmey
54135	54170	Colombey-les-Belles
54136	54800	Conflans-en-Jarnisy
54137	54870	Cons-la-Grandville
54138	54400	Cosnes-et-Romain
54139	54110	Courbesseaux
54140	54930	Courcelles
54141	54210	Coyviller
54142	54740	Crantenoy
54143	54170	Crépey
54144	54290	Crévéchamps
54145	54110	Crévic
54146	54113	Crézilles
54147	54300	Crion
54148	54300	Croismare
54149	54680	Crusnes
54150	54670	Custines
54151	54720	Cutry
54152	54360	Damelevières
54153	54470	Dampvitoux
54154	54120	Deneuvre
54155	54370	Deuxville
54156	54930	Diarville
54157	54380	Dieulouard
54158	54170	Dolcourt
54159	54110	Dombasle-sur-Meurthe
54160	54385	Domèvre-en-Haye
54161	54450	Domèvre-sur-Vezouze
54162	54119	Domgermain
54163	54450	Domjevin
54164	54115	Dommarie-Eulmont
54165	54130	Dommartemont
54166	54470	Dommartin-la-Chaussée
54167	54200	Dommartin-lès-Toul
54168	54770	Dommartin-sous-Amance
54169	54490	Domprix
54170	54290	Domptail-en-l'Air
54171	54800	Doncourt-lès-Conflans
54172	54620	Doncourt-lès-Longuyon
54173	54370	Drouville
54174	54200	Écrouves
54175	54360	Einvaux
54176	54370	Einville-au-Jard
54177	54370	Emberménil
54178	54260	Épiez-sur-Chiers
54179	54610	Éply
54180	54280	Erbéviller-sur-Amezule
54181	54680	Errouville
54182	54470	Essey-et-Maizerais
54183	54830	Essey-la-Côte
54184	54270	Essey-lès-Nancy
54185	54330	Étreval
54186	54690	Eulmont
54187	54470	Euvezin
54188	54760	Faulx
54189	54115	Favières
54190	54115	Fécocourt
54191	54540	Fenneviller
54192	54210	Ferrières
54193	54470	Fey-en-Haye
54194	54560	Fillières
54195	54110	Flainval
54196	54630	Flavigny-sur-Moselle
54197	54710	Fléville-devant-Nancy
54198	54150	Fléville-Lixières
54199	54122	Flin
54200	54470	Flirey
54201	54122	Fontenoy-la-Joûte
54202	54840	Fontenoy-sur-Moselle
54203	54330	Forcelles-Saint-Gorgon
54204	54930	Forcelles-sous-Gugney
54205	54570	Foug
54206	54300	Fraimbois
54207	54930	Fraisnes-en-Saintois
54208	54200	Francheville
54209	54830	Franconville
54210	54450	Fréménil
54211	54450	Frémonville
54212	54260	Fresnois-la-Montagne
54213	54800	Friauville
54214	54160	Frolois
54215	54390	Frouard
54216	54290	Froville
54217	54120	Gélacourt
54218	54115	Gélaucourt
54219	54110	Gellenoncourt
54220	54115	Gémonville
54221	54740	Gerbécourt-et-Haplemont
54222	54830	Gerbéviller
54223	54170	Germiny
54224	54740	Germonville
54225	54380	Gézoncourt
54226	54112	Gibeaumeix
54227	54780	Giraumont
54228	54830	Giriviller
54229	54122	Glonville
54230	54450	Gogney
54231	54800	Gondrecourt-Aix
54232	54840	Gondreville
54233	54450	Gondrexon
54234	54730	Gorcy
54235	54330	Goviller
54236	54260	Grand-Failly
54237	54115	Grimonviller
54238	54290	Gripport
54239	54380	Griscourt
54240	54470	Grosrouvres
54241	54930	Gugney
54242	54113	Gye
54243	54120	Hablainville
54244	54470	Hagéville
54245	54290	Haigneville
54246	54450	Halloville
54247	54330	Hammeville
54248	54470	Hamonville
54602	54620	Han-devant-Pierrepont
54249	54800	Hannonville-Suzémont
54250	54110	Haraucourt
54251	54450	Harbouey
54252	54740	Haroué
54253	54800	Hatrize
54254	54860	Haucourt-Moulaine
54255	54830	Haudonville
54256	54290	Haussonville
54257	54180	Heillecourt
54258	54370	Hénaménil
54259	54450	Herbéviller
54260	54300	Hériménil
54261	54440	Herserange
54262	54370	Hoéville
54263	54310	Homécourt
54264	54330	Houdelmont
54265	54180	Houdemont
54266	54330	Houdreville
54268	54930	Housséville
54269	54110	Hudiviller
54270	54590	Hussigny-Godbrange
54271	54450	Igney
54272	54200	Jaillon
54273	54800	Jarny
54274	54140	Jarville-la-Malgrange
54275	54470	Jaulny
54276	54114	Jeandelaincourt
54277	54800	Jeandelize
54278	54740	Jevoncourt
54279	54700	Jezainville
54280	54240	Jœuf
54281	54300	Jolivet
54282	54620	Joppécourt
54283	54800	Jouaville
54284	54490	Joudreville
54285	54370	Juvrecourt
54286	54800	Labry
54287	54120	Lachapelle
54288	54200	Lagney
54289	54770	Laître-sous-Amance
54290	54720	Laix
54291	54115	Lalœuf
54292	54300	Lamath
54293	54360	Landécourt
54294	54380	Landremont
54295	54970	Landres
54296	54280	Laneuvelotte
54297	54370	Laneuveville-aux-Bois
54298	54570	Laneuveville-derrière-Foug
54299	54740	Laneuveville-devant-Bayon
54300	54410	Laneuveville-devant-Nancy

INSEE code	Postal code	Commune
54301	54760	Lanfroicourt
54302	54150	Lantéfontaine
54303	54950	Laronxe
54304	54520	Laxou
54305	54690	Lay-Saint-Christophe
54306	54570	Lay-Saint-Remy
54307	54740	Lebeuville
54308	54450	Leintrey
54309	54740	Lemainville
54310	54740	Leménil-Mitry
54311	54110	Lenoncourt
54312	54700	Lesménils
54313	54610	Létricourt
54314	54720	Lexy
54315	54760	Leyr
54316	54470	Limey-Remenauville
54317	54470	Lironville
54318	54460	Liverdun
54320	54700	Loisy
54321	54810	Longlaville
54322	54260	Longuyon
54323	54400	Longwy
54324	54290	Lorey
54325	54290	Loromontzey
54326	54150	Lubey
54327	54200	Lucey
54328	54710	Ludres
54329	54300	Lunéville
54330	54210	Lupcourt
54331	54129	Magnières
54332	54700	Maidières
54333	54610	Mailly-sur-Seille
54334	54150	Mairy-Mainville
54335	54370	Maixe
54336	54550	Maizières
54337	54560	Malavillers
54338	54670	Malleloy
54339	54220	Malzéville
54340	54470	Mamey
54343	54470	Mandres-aux-Quatre-Tours
54344	54290	Mangonville
54345	54210	Manoncourt-en-Vermois
54346	54385	Manoncourt-en-Woëvre
54348	54385	Manonville
54349	54300	Manonviller
54350	54300	Marainviller
54351	54820	Marbache
54352	54230	Maron
54353	54800	Mars-la-Tour
54354	54330	Marthemont
54355	54380	Martincourt
54356	54830	Mattexey
54357	54320	Maxéville
54358	54280	Mazerulles
54359	54360	Méhoncourt
54360	54200	Ménil-la-Tour
54362	54960	Mercy-le-Bas
54363	54560	Mercy-le-Haut
54364	54850	Méréville
54365	54120	Merviller
54366	54850	Messein
54367	54135	Mexy
54368	54540	Mignéville
54369	54670	Millery
54370	54385	Minorville
54371	54580	Moineville
54372	54760	Moivrons
54373	54300	Moncel-lès-Lunéville
54374	54280	Moncel-sur-Seille
54375	54700	Montauville
54084	54111	Mont-Bonvillers
54376	54760	Montenoy
54377	54540	Montigny
54378	54870	Montigny-sur-Chiers
54379	54170	Mont-l'Étroit
54380	54113	Mont-le-Vignoble
54381	54450	Montreux
54382	54350	Mont-Saint-Martin
54383	54360	Mont-sur-Meurthe
54385	54920	Morfontaine
54386	54830	Moriviller
54387	54700	Morville-sur-Seille
54388	54370	Mouacourt
54389	54800	Mouaville
54390	54700	Mousson
54391	54660	Moutiers
54392	54113	Moutrot
54393	54118	Moyen
54394	54490	Murville
54395	54000	Nancy
54396	54540	Neufmaisons
54397	54230	Neuves-Maisons
54398	54540	Neuviller-lès-Badonviller
54399	54290	Neuviller-sur-Moselle
54400	54610	Nomeny
54401	54450	Nonhigny
54402	54150	Norroy-le-Sec
54403	54700	Norroy-lès-Pont-à-Mousson
54404	54385	Noviant-aux-Prés
54405	54170	Ochey
54406	54450	Ogéviller
54407	54330	Ognéville
54408	54800	Olley
54409	54330	Omelmont
54410	54890	Onville
54411	54740	Ormes-et-Ville
54412	54260	Othe
54413	54150	Ozerailles
54414	54200	Pagney-derrière-Barine
54415	54530	Pagny-sur-Moselle
54416	54470	Pannes
54417	54330	Parey-Saint-Césaire
54418	54370	Parroy
54419	54480	Parux
54420	54260	Petit-Failly
54421	54480	Petitmont
54422	54120	Pettonville
54423	54540	Pexonne
54424	54610	Phlin
54425	54490	Piennes
54426	54200	Pierre-la-Treiche
54427	54540	Pierre-Percée
54428	54620	Pierrepont
54429	54160	Pierreville
54430	54340	Pompey
54431	54700	Pont-à-Mousson
54432	54550	Pont-Saint-Vincent
54433	54700	Port-sur-Seille
54434	54116	Praye
54435	54530	Prény
54436	54490	Preutin-Higny
54437	54160	Pulligny
54438	54115	Pulney
54439	54425	Pulnoy
54440	54800	Puxe
54441	54800	Puxieux
54442	54330	Quevilloncourt
54443	54540	Raon-lès-Leau
54444	54610	Raucourt
54445	54370	Raville-sur-Sânon
54446	54370	Réchicourt-la-Petite
54447	54450	Réclonville
54449	54300	Rehainviller
54450	54120	Reherrey
54451	54430	Réhon
54452	54450	Reillon
54453	54470	Rembercourt-sur-Mad
54455	54830	Remenoville
54456	54110	Réméréville
54457	54370	Remoncourt
54458	54450	Repaix
54459	54630	Richardménil
54460	54380	Rogéville
54461	54360	Romain
54462	54110	Rosières-aux-Salines
54463	54385	Rosières-en-Haye
54464	54610	Rouves
54465	54290	Roville-devant-Bayon
54466	54200	Royaumeix
54467	54290	Rozelieures
54468	54210	Saffais
54469	54580	Saint-Ail
54470	54470	Saint-Baussant
54471	54290	Saint-Boingt
54472	54950	Saint-Clément
54474	54700	Sainte-Geneviève
54484	54540	Sainte-Pôle
54473	54930	Saint-Firmin
54475	54290	Saint-Germain
54476	54260	Saint-Jean-lès-Longuyon
54477	54470	Saint-Julien-lès-Gorze
54478	54800	Saint-Marcel
54479	54290	Saint-Mard
54480	54450	Saint-Martin
54481	54540	Saint-Maurice-aux-Forges
54482	54130	Saint-Max
54483	54210	Saint-Nicolas-de-Port
54485	54730	Saint-Pancré
54486	54740	Saint-Remimont
54487	54290	Saint-Rémy-aux-Bois
54488	54480	Saint-Sauveur
54489	54620	Saint-Supplet
54490	54380	Saizerais
54491	54560	Sancy
54492	54200	Sanzey
54493	54650	Saulnes
54494	54115	Saulxerotte
54495	54420	Saulxures-lès-Nancy
54496	54170	Saulxures-lès-Vannes
54497	54330	Saxon-Sion
54498	54280	Seichamps
54499	54470	Seicheprey
54500	54170	Selaincourt
54501	54830	Seranville
54502	54370	Serres
54504	54560	Serrouville
54505	54550	Sexey-aux-Forges
54507	54300	Sionviller
54508	54610	Sivry
54509	54110	Sommerviller
54510	54280	Sornéville
54511	54800	Sponville
54512	54480	Tanconville
54513	54116	Tantonville
54514	54260	Tellancourt
54515	54330	Thélod
54516	54930	They-sous-Vaudemont
54517	54610	Thézey-Saint-Martin
54518	54470	Thiaucourt-Regniéville
54519	54120	Thiaville-sur-Meurthe
54520	54300	Thiébauménil
54521	54880	Thil
54522	54115	Thorey-Lyautey
54523	54170	Thuilley-aux-Groseilles
54524	54800	Thumeréville
54525	54190	Tiercelet
54526	54510	Tomblaine
54527	54210	Tonnoy
54528	54200	Toul
54529	54115	Tramont-Émy
54530	54115	Tramont-Lassus
54531	54115	Tramont-Saint-André
54532	54385	Tremblecourt
54533	54750	Trieux
54534	54570	Trondes
54535	54800	Tronville
54536	54640	Tucquegnieux
54537	54870	Ugny
54538	54112	Uruffe
54539	54540	Vacqueville
54099	54150	Val de Briey
54540	54480	Val-et-Châtillon
54541	54370	Valhey
54542	54910	Valleroy
54543	54830	Vallois
54544	54890	Vandelainville
54545	54115	Vandeléville
54546	54121	Vandières
54547	54500	Vandœuvre-lès-Nancy
54548	54112	Vannes-le-Châtel
54549	54110	Varangéville
54550	54122	Vathiménil
54551	54370	Vaucourt
54552	54330	Vaudémont
54553	54740	Vaudeville
54554	54740	Vaudigny
54555	54120	Vaxainville
54556	54450	Vého
54558	54280	Velaine-sous-Amance
54559	54290	Velle-sur-Moselle
54560	54540	Veney
54561	54830	Vennezey
54562	54450	Verdenal
54563	54330	Vézelise
54564	54470	Viéville-en-Haye
54565	54360	Vigneulles
54566	54700	Vilcey-sur-Trey
54567	54290	Villacourt
54568	54620	Ville-au-Montois
54569	54380	Ville-au-Val
54570	54890	Villecey-sur-Mad
54571	54210	Ville-en-Vermois
54572	54730	Ville-Houdlémont
54573	54380	Villers-en-Haye
54574	54870	Villers-la-Chèvre
54575	54920	Villers-la-Montagne
54576	54260	Villers-le-Rond
54577	54760	Villers-lès-Moivrons
54578	54600	Villers-lès-Nancy
54579	54700	Villers-sous-Prény
54580	54190	Villerupt
54581	54800	Ville-sur-Yron
54582	54260	Villette
54583	54840	Villey-le-Sec
54584	54200	Villey-Saint-Étienne
54585	54290	Virecourt
54586	54123	Viterne
54587	54330	Vitrey
54588	54300	Vitrimont
54589	54700	Vittonville
54590	54260	Viviers-sur-Chiers
54591	54134	Voinémont
54592	54330	Vroncourt
54593	54890	Waville
54594	54470	Xammes
54595	54300	Xermaménil
54596	54990	Xeuilley
54597	54740	Xirocourt
54598	54490	Xivry-Circourt
54599	54800	Xonville
54600	54370	Xousse
54601	54370	Xures
