= Anthelupt =

- Commune
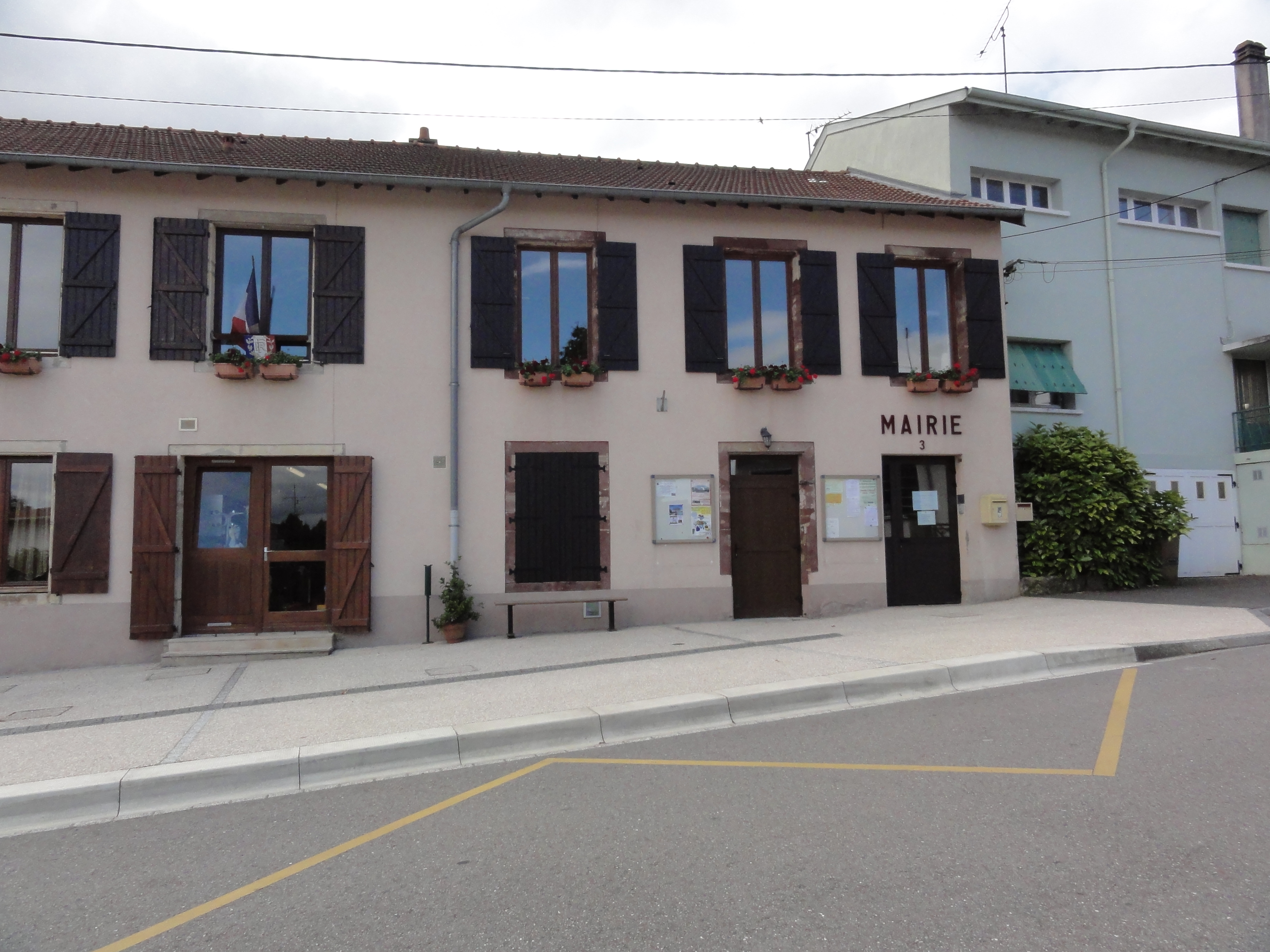
- The town hall in Anthelupt

- Coat of arms
- Location of Anthelupt
- Location within France Location within Grand Est
- Coordinates: 48°36′37″N 6°24′53″E
- Country: France
- Region: Grand Est
- Department: Meurthe-et-Moselle
- Arrondissement: Lunéville
- Canton: Lunéville-1
- Intercommunality: Pays du Sânon

Government
  - Mayor (2022–2026): Nicole Claver
- Area^{1}: 7.82 km^{2} (3.02 sq mi)
- Elevation: 300 m (980 ft)
- Highest elevation: 313 m (1,027 ft)
- Lowest elevation: 221 m (725 ft)
- Population (2023): 440
  - Density: 56/km^{2} (150/sq mi)
- Time zone: UTC+01:00 (CET)
  - Summer (DST): UTC+02:00 (CEST)
- INSEE/Postal code: 54020 /54110
- ^{1} French Land Register data, which excludes lakes, ponds, glaciers > 1 km^{2} (0.386 sq mi or 247 acres) and river estuaries.

Anthelupt (French pronunciation: [ɑ̃tly]) is a commune in the Meurthe-et-Moselle department (Grand Est Region) in northeastern France.

== Population ==
Historical population
Year	Pop.	±% p.a.
1968	295	—
1975	294	−0.05%
1982	392	+4.20%
1990	406	+0.44%
1999	430	+0.64%
2007	442	+0.34%
2012	441	−0.05%
2017	461	+0.89%
2023	440	−0.77%
Source: INSEE

== See also ==
- Communes of the Meurthe-et-Moselle department
