= Maixe =

- Commune
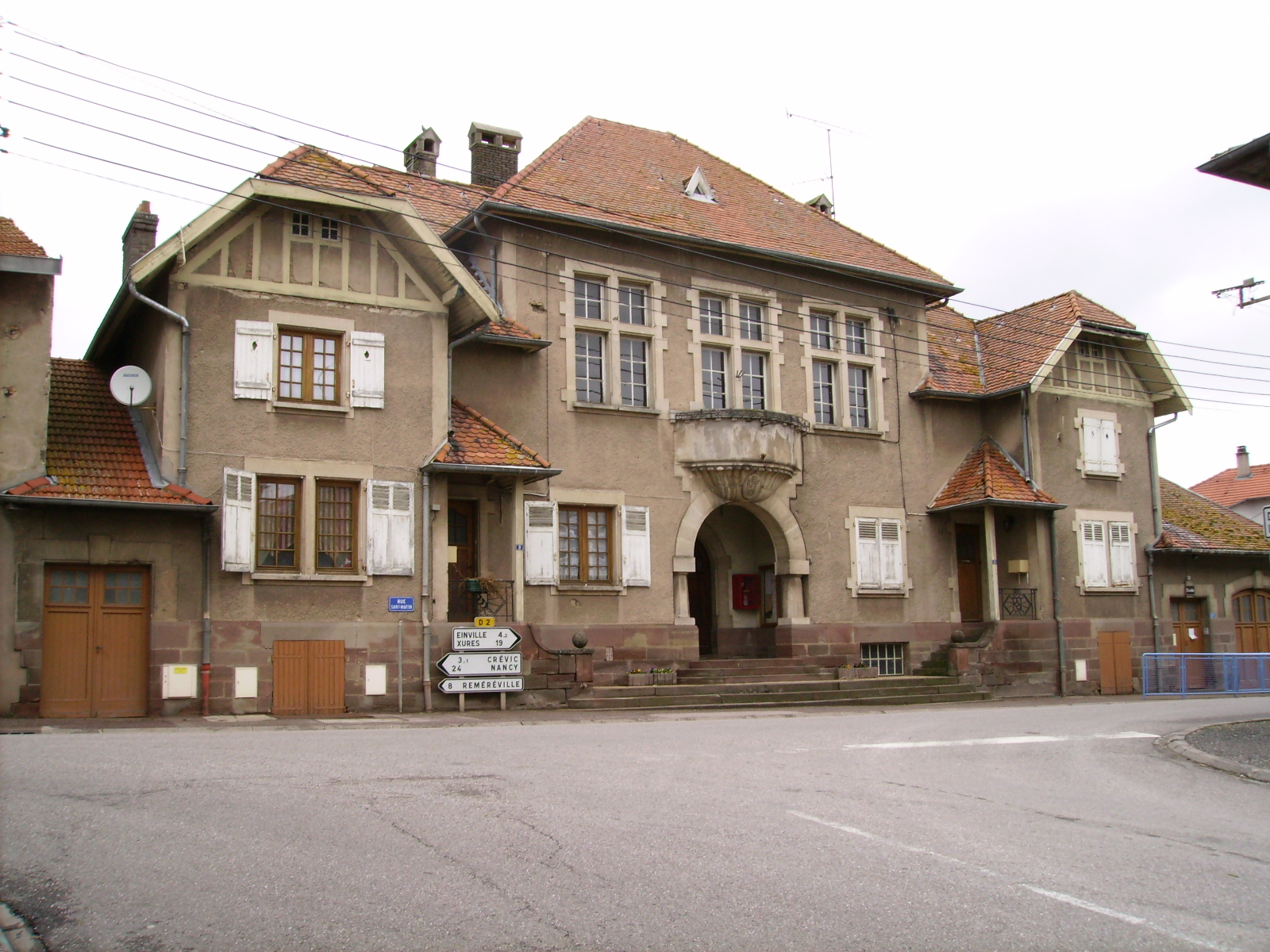
- The town hall in Maixe

- Coat of arms
- Location of Maixe
- Location within France Location within Grand Est
- Coordinates: 48°38′45″N 6°26′25″E
- Country: France
- Region: Grand Est
- Department: Meurthe-et-Moselle
- Arrondissement: Lunéville
- Canton: Lunéville-1
- Intercommunality: CC Pays du Sânon

Government
  - Mayor (2020–2026): Alexandra Hinzelin
- Area^{1}: 9.33 km^{2} (3.60 sq mi)
- Elevation: 215 m (705 ft)
- Highest elevation: 314 m (1,030 ft)
- Lowest elevation: 213 m (699 ft)
- Population (2023): 409
  - Density: 43.8/km^{2} (114/sq mi)
- Demonym: Maixois
- Time zone: UTC+01:00 (CET)
  - Summer (DST): UTC+02:00 (CEST)
- INSEE/Postal code: 54335 /54370
- ^{1} French Land Register data, which excludes lakes, ponds, glaciers > 1 km^{2} (0.386 sq mi or 247 acres) and river estuaries.

Maixe is a commune in the Meurthe-et-Moselle department in north-eastern France.

== See also ==
- Communes of the Meurthe-et-Moselle department
