= Laneuveville-aux-Bois =

- Commune
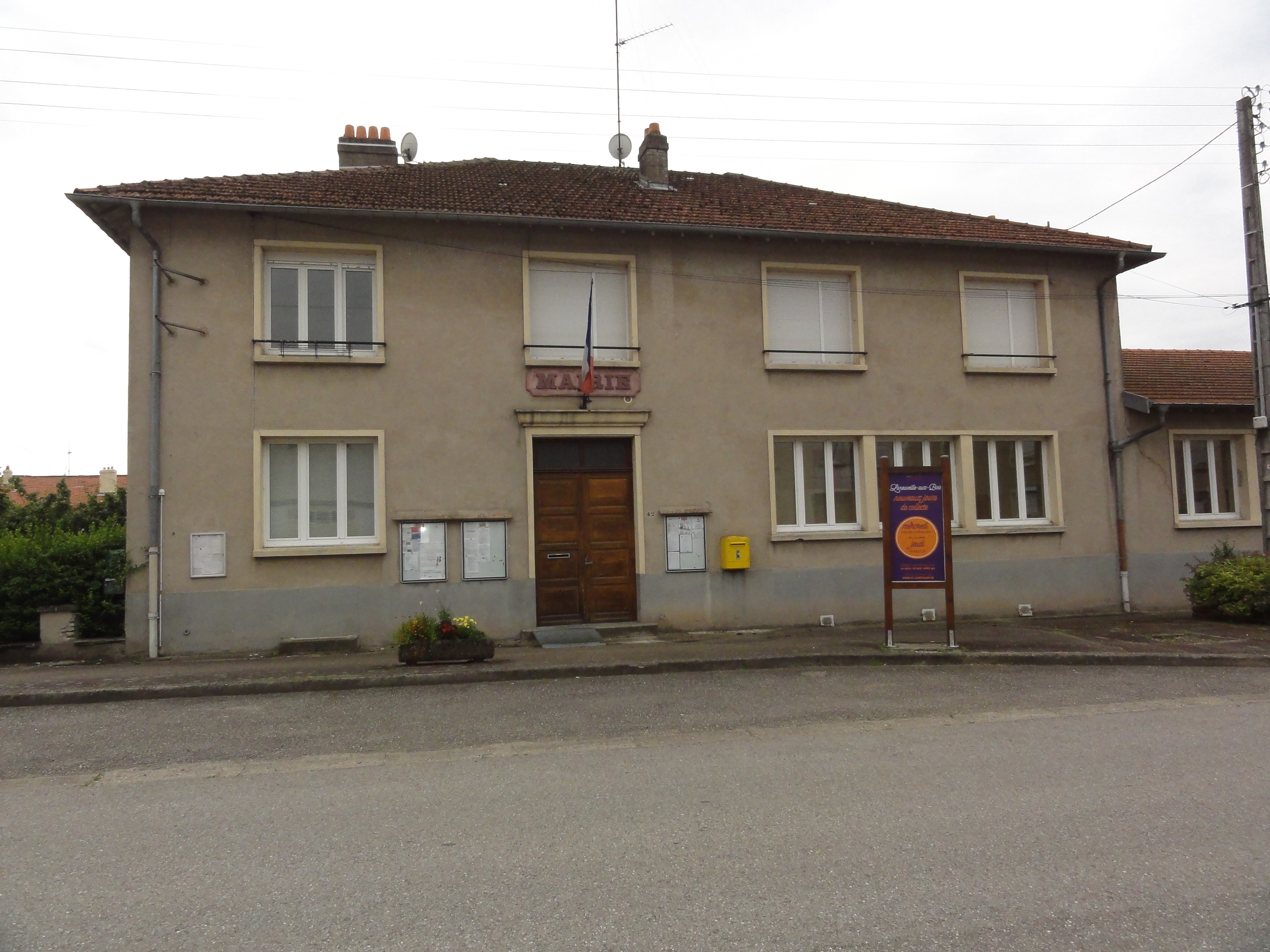
- The town hall in Laneuveville-aux-Bois

- Coat of arms
- Location of Laneuveville-aux-Bois
- Location within France Location within Grand Est
- Coordinates: 48°36′43″N 6°39′03″E
- Country: France
- Region: Grand Est
- Department: Meurthe-et-Moselle
- Arrondissement: Lunéville
- Canton: Baccarat
- Intercommunality: CC Territoire de Lunéville à Baccarat

Government
  - Mayor (2020–2026): Murielle Collot
- Area^{1}: 19.04 km^{2} (7.35 sq mi)
- Elevation: 240 m (790 ft)
- Highest elevation: 303 m (994 ft)
- Lowest elevation: 232 m (761 ft)
- Population (2023): 300
  - Density: 16/km^{2} (41/sq mi)
- Time zone: UTC+01:00 (CET)
  - Summer (DST): UTC+02:00 (CEST)
- INSEE/Postal code: 54297 /54370
- ^{1} French Land Register data, which excludes lakes, ponds, glaciers > 1 km^{2} (0.386 sq mi or 247 acres) and river estuaries.

Laneuveville-aux-Bois (French pronunciation: [lanœv.vil o bwa]) is a commune in the Meurthe-et-Moselle department in north-eastern France. The inhabitants of the town of Laneuveville-aux-Bois are called Laneuvillois, Laneuvilloises in French.

== See also ==
- Communes of the Meurthe-et-Moselle department
