= Flainval =

- Commune
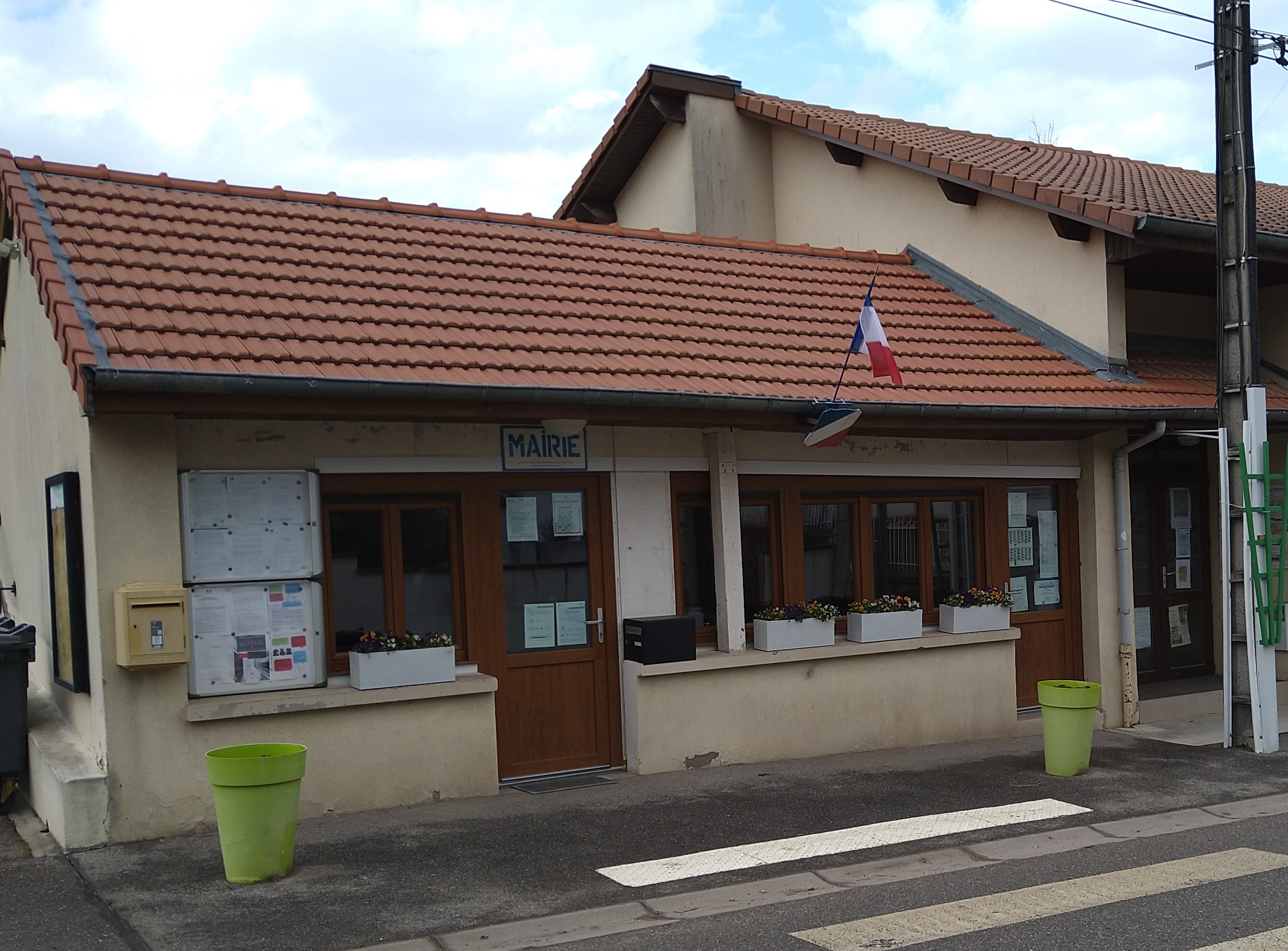
- Flainval Town Hall

- Coat of arms
- Location of Flainval
- Location within France Location within Grand Est
- Coordinates: 48°37′11″N 6°23′59″E
- Country: France
- Region: Grand Est
- Department: Meurthe-et-Moselle
- Arrondissement: Lunéville
- Canton: Lunéville-1
- Intercommunality: CC du Pays du Sânon

Government
  - Mayor (2020–2026): Jean-Pierre Jacquemin
- Area^{1}: 3.61 km^{2} (1.39 sq mi)
- Elevation: 240 m (790 ft)
- Highest elevation: 312 m (1,024 ft)
- Lowest elevation: 218 m (715 ft)
- Population (2023): 159
  - Density: 44.0/km^{2} (114/sq mi)
- Time zone: UTC+01:00 (CET)
  - Summer (DST): UTC+02:00 (CEST)
- INSEE/Postal code: 54195 /54110
- ^{1} French Land Register data, which excludes lakes, ponds, glaciers > 1 km^{2} (0.386 sq mi or 247 acres) and river estuaries.

Flainval (French pronunciation: [flɛ̃val]) is a commune in the Meurthe-et-Moselle department in north-eastern France.

== See also ==
- Communes of the Meurthe-et-Moselle department
