= Vitrimont =

- Commune
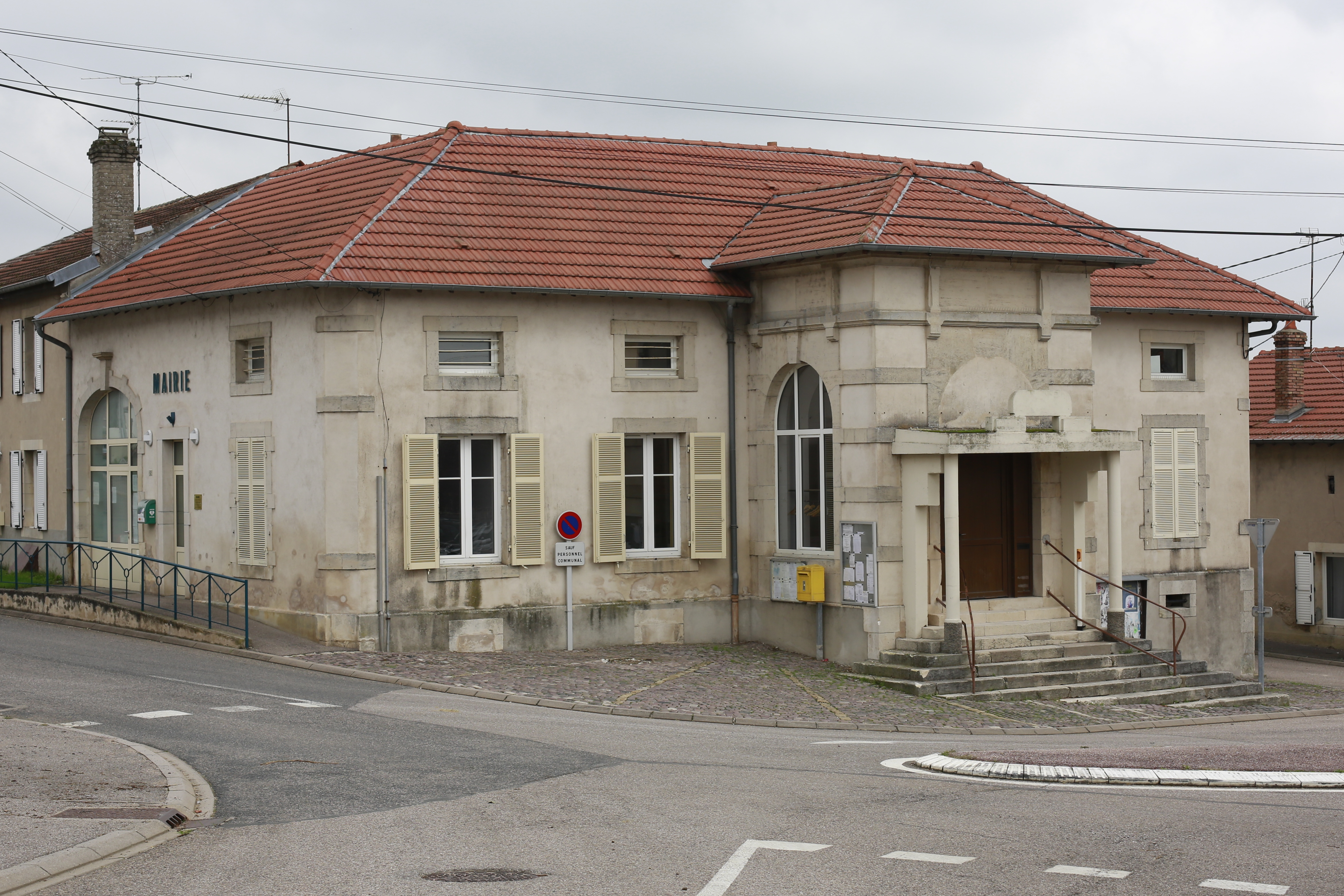
- The town hall in Vitrimont

- Coat of arms
- Location of Vitrimont
- Location within France Location within Grand Est
- Coordinates: 48°36′05″N 6°26′25″E
- Country: France
- Region: Grand Est
- Department: Meurthe-et-Moselle
- Arrondissement: Lunéville
- Canton: Lunéville-1
- Intercommunality: CC Territoire de Lunéville à Baccarat

Government
  - Mayor (2020–2026): Jacques Pister
- Area^{1}: 11.85 km^{2} (4.58 sq mi)
- Elevation: 270 m (890 ft)
- Highest elevation: 331 m (1,086 ft)
- Lowest elevation: 217 m (712 ft)
- Population (2023): 384
  - Density: 32.4/km^{2} (83.9/sq mi)
- Time zone: UTC+01:00 (CET)
  - Summer (DST): UTC+02:00 (CEST)
- INSEE/Postal code: 54588 /54300
- ^{1} French Land Register data, which excludes lakes, ponds, glaciers > 1 km^{2} (0.386 sq mi or 247 acres) and river estuaries.

Vitrimont (French pronunciation: [vitʁimɔ̃]) is a commune in the Meurthe-et-Moselle department in north-eastern France.

== See also ==
- Communes of the Meurthe-et-Moselle department
