= Raville-sur-Sânon =

- Commune
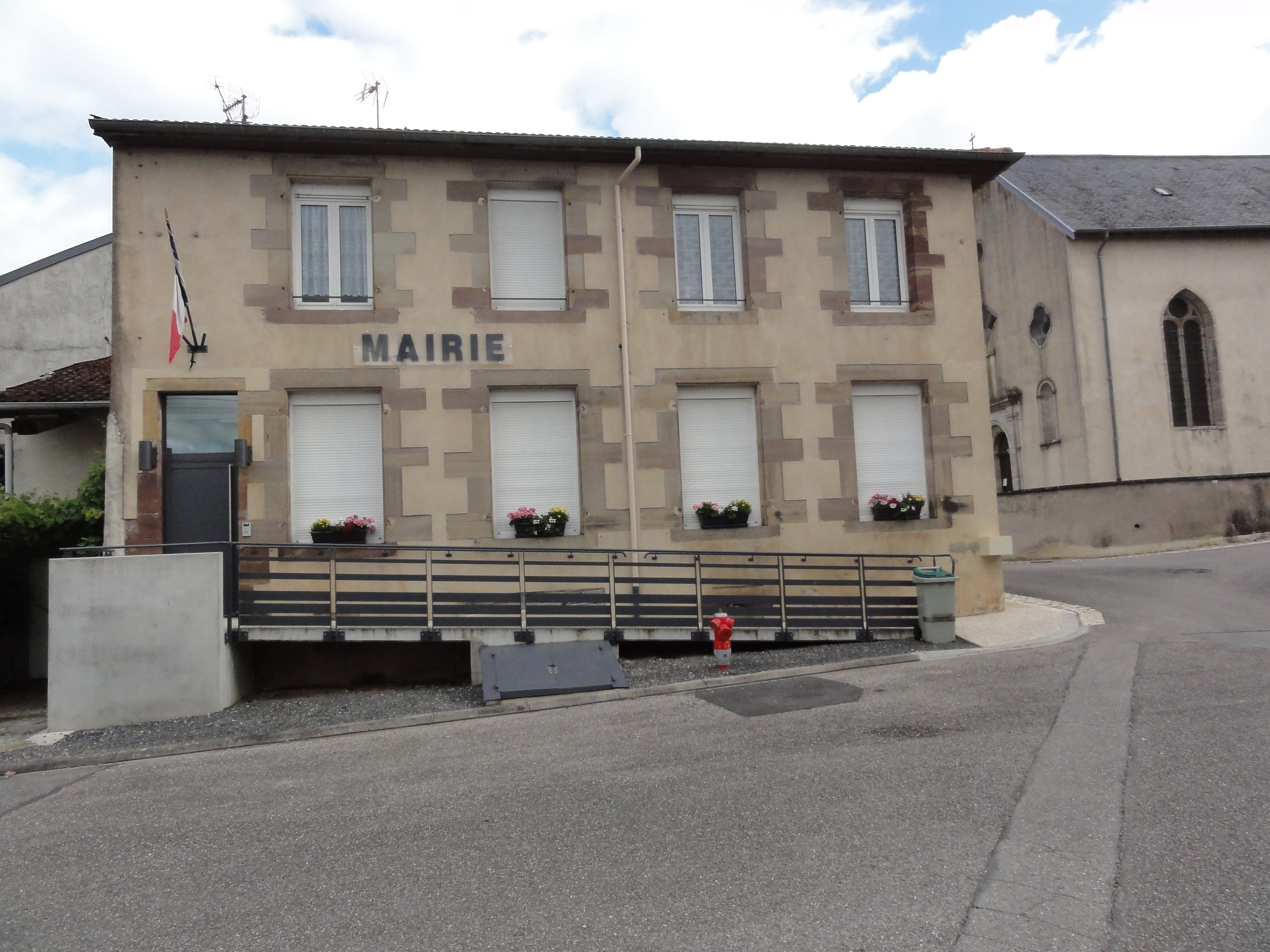
- The town hall in Raville-sur-Sânon

- Coat of arms
- Location of Raville-sur-Sânon
- Location within France Location within Grand Est
- Coordinates: 48°39′06″N 6°29′53″E
- Country: France
- Region: Grand Est
- Department: Meurthe-et-Moselle
- Arrondissement: Lunéville
- Canton: Lunéville-1
- Intercommunality: Pays du Sânon

Government
  - Mayor (2020–2026): Patrice Malgras
- Area^{1}: 3.35 km^{2} (1.29 sq mi)
- Elevation: 225 m (738 ft)
- Highest elevation: 274 m (899 ft)
- Lowest elevation: 217 m (712 ft)
- Population (2023): 106
  - Density: 31.6/km^{2} (82.0/sq mi)
- Time zone: UTC+01:00 (CET)
  - Summer (DST): UTC+02:00 (CEST)
- INSEE/Postal code: 54445 /54370
- ^{1} French Land Register data, which excludes lakes, ponds, glaciers > 1 km^{2} (0.386 sq mi or 247 acres) and river estuaries.

Raville-sur-Sânon (French pronunciation: [ʁavil syʁ sanɔ̃]) is a commune in the Meurthe-et-Moselle department in north-eastern France.

== See also ==
- Communes of the Meurthe-et-Moselle department
