= Deuxville =

- Commune
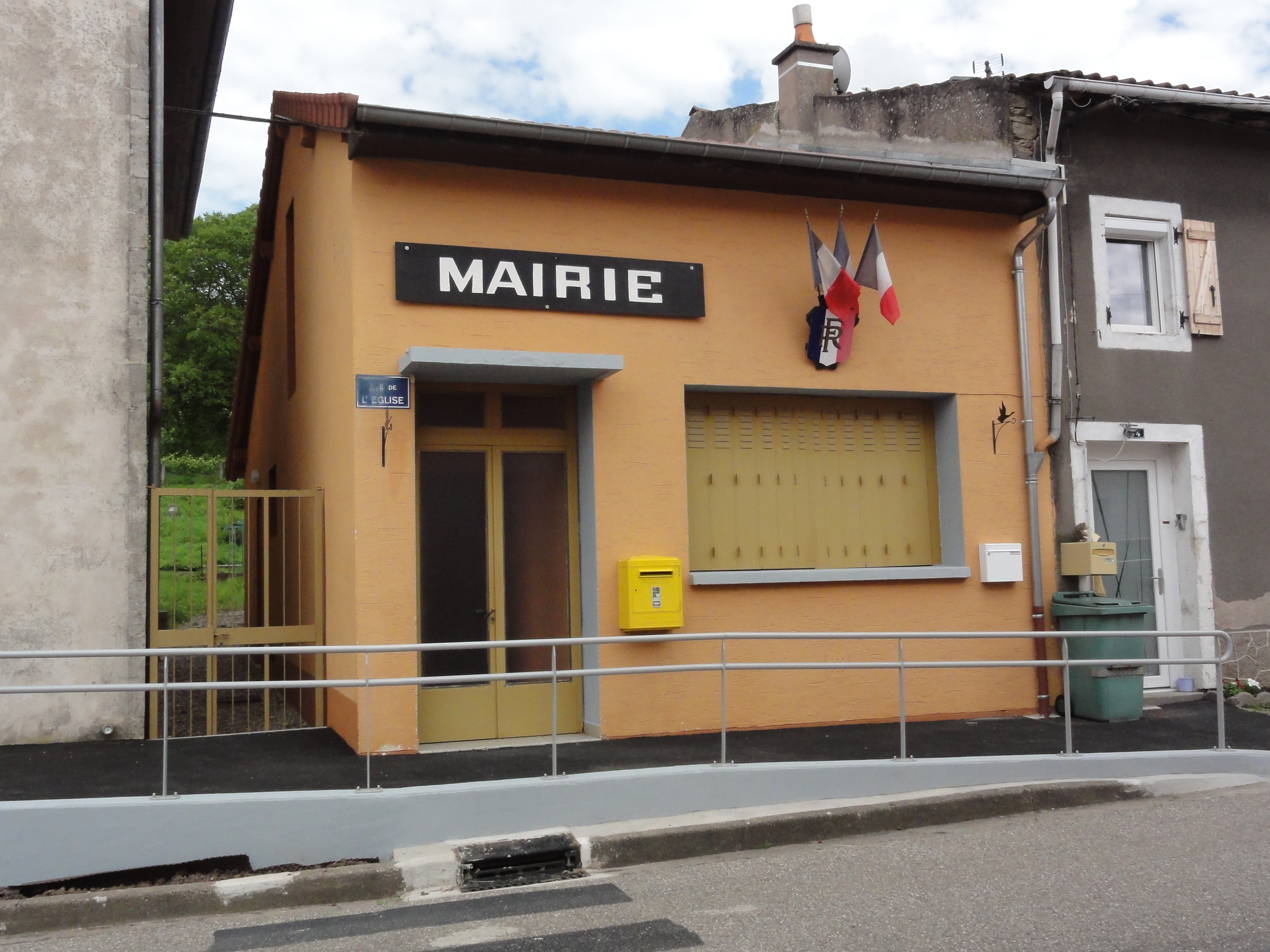
- The town hall in Deuxville

- Coat of arms
- Location of Deuxville
- Location within France Location within Grand Est
- Coordinates: 48°37′07″N 6°27′21″E
- Country: France
- Region: Grand Est
- Department: Meurthe-et-Moselle
- Arrondissement: Lunéville
- Canton: Lunéville-1
- Intercommunality: CC du Pays du Sânon

Government
  - Mayor (2024–2026): Francis Faltot
- Area^{1}: 7.23 km^{2} (2.79 sq mi)
- Elevation: 228 m (748 ft)
- Highest elevation: 340 m (1,120 ft)
- Lowest elevation: 225 m (738 ft)
- Population (2023): 400
  - Density: 55/km^{2} (140/sq mi)
- Time zone: UTC+01:00 (CET)
  - Summer (DST): UTC+02:00 (CEST)
- INSEE/Postal code: 54155 /54370
- ^{1} French Land Register data, which excludes lakes, ponds, glaciers > 1 km^{2} (0.386 sq mi or 247 acres) and river estuaries.

Deuxville is a commune in the Meurthe-et-Moselle department in north-eastern France.

== See also ==
- Communes of the Meurthe-et-Moselle department
