= Croismare =

- Commune
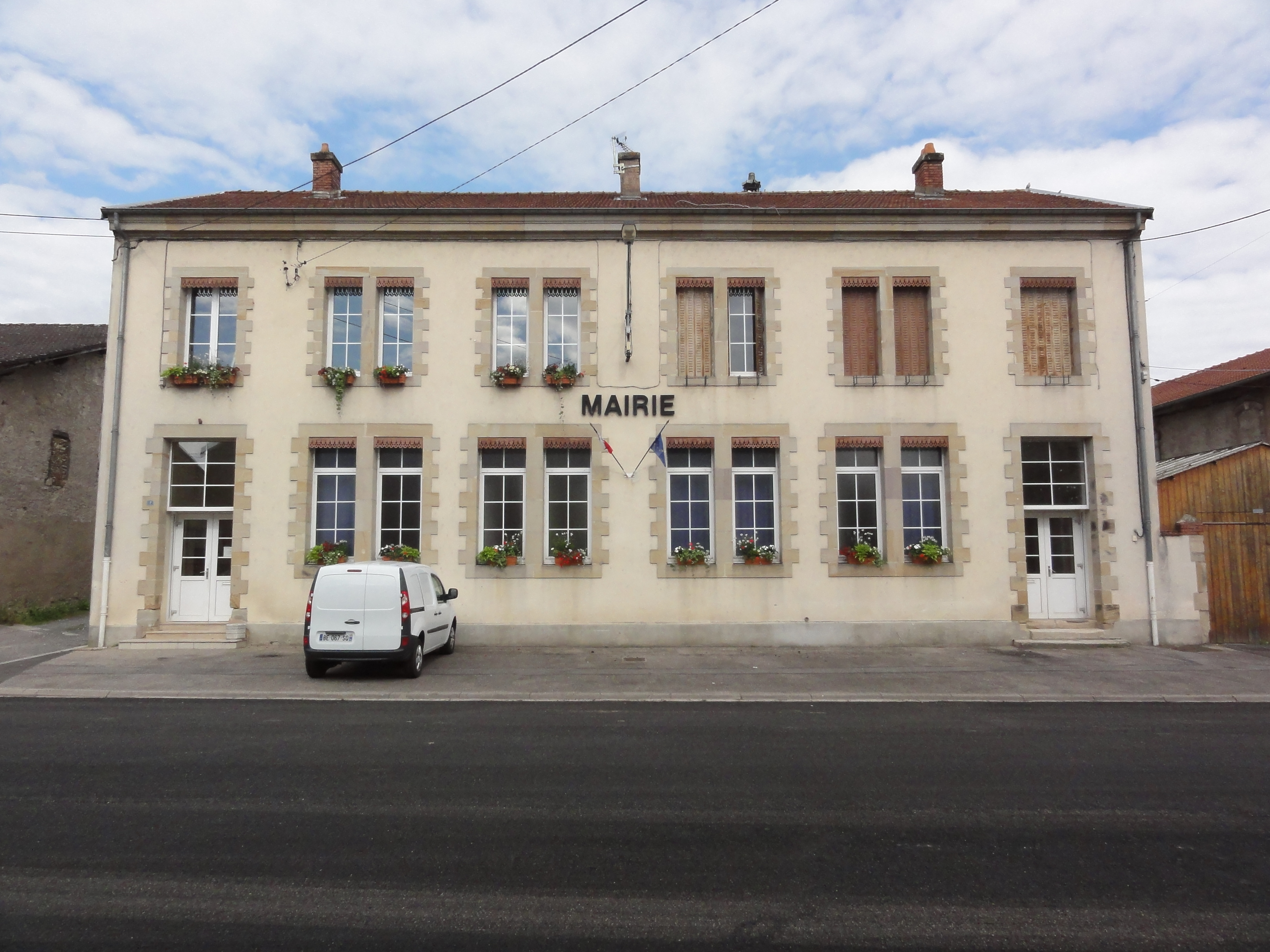
- The town hall in Croismare

- Coat of arms
- Location of Croismare
- Location within France Location within Grand Est
- Coordinates: 48°35′59″N 6°34′17″E
- Country: France
- Region: Grand Est
- Department: Meurthe-et-Moselle
- Arrondissement: Lunéville
- Canton: Lunéville-1
- Intercommunality: CC Territoire de Lunéville à Baccarat

Government
  - Mayor (2020–2026): Catherine Dron
- Area^{1}: 15.7 km^{2} (6.1 sq mi)
- Elevation: 232 m (761 ft)
- Highest elevation: 293 m (961 ft)
- Lowest elevation: 224 m (735 ft)
- Population (2023): 626
  - Density: 39.9/km^{2} (103/sq mi)
- Time zone: UTC+01:00 (CET)
  - Summer (DST): UTC+02:00 (CEST)
- INSEE/Postal code: 54148 /54300
- ^{1} French Land Register data, which excludes lakes, ponds, glaciers > 1 km^{2} (0.386 sq mi or 247 acres) and river estuaries.

Croismare (French pronunciation: [kʁwamaʁ]) is a commune in the Meurthe-et-Moselle department in north-eastern France.

== See also ==
- Communes of the Meurthe-et-Moselle department
