= Courbesseaux =

- Commune
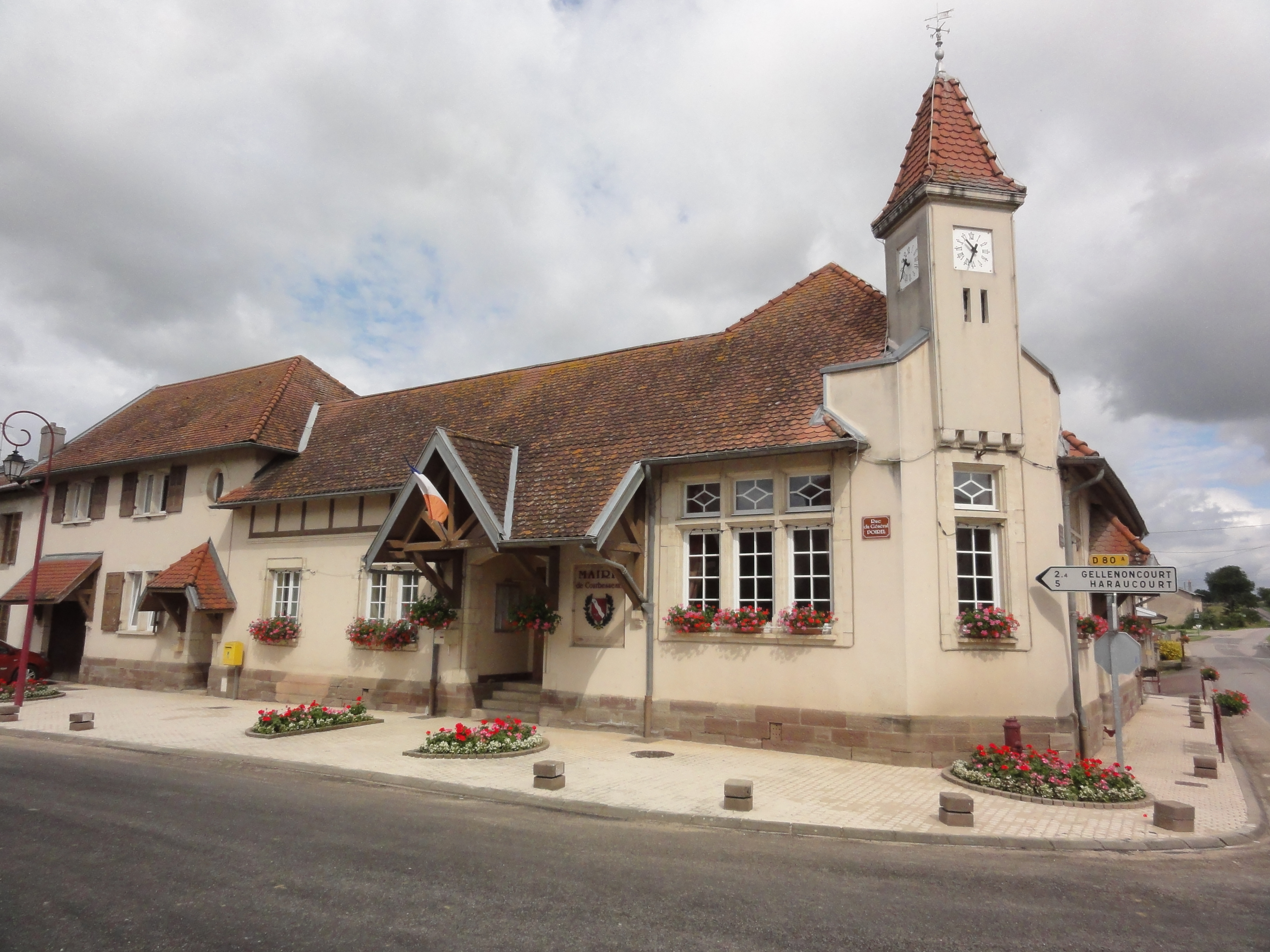
- The town hall in Courbesseaux

- Coat of arms
- Location of Courbesseaux
- Location within France Location within Grand Est
- Coordinates: 48°41′25″N 6°23′48″E
- Country: France
- Region: Grand Est
- Department: Meurthe-et-Moselle
- Arrondissement: Lunéville
- Canton: Lunéville-1
- Intercommunality: CC Pays du Sânon

Government
  - Mayor (2020–2026): Fabrice Boyer
- Area^{1}: 6.32 km^{2} (2.44 sq mi)
- Elevation: 230 m (750 ft)
- Highest elevation: 293 m (961 ft)
- Lowest elevation: 217 m (712 ft)
- Population (2023): 397
  - Density: 62.8/km^{2} (163/sq mi)
- Time zone: UTC+01:00 (CET)
  - Summer (DST): UTC+02:00 (CEST)
- INSEE/Postal code: 54139 /54110
- ^{1} French Land Register data, which excludes lakes, ponds, glaciers > 1 km^{2} (0.386 sq mi or 247 acres) and river estuaries.

Courbesseaux (French pronunciation: [kuʁbɛso]) is a commune in the Meurthe-et-Moselle department in north-eastern France. It has a small population, it also contains a medium-sized military cemetery from WW2, at the middle of the town is also located the église de la Sainte-Croix de Courbesseaux, an old church, now rarely used, except for the bus stop next to it used by children.

== See also ==
- Communes of the Meurthe-et-Moselle department
