= Bauzemont =

- Commune
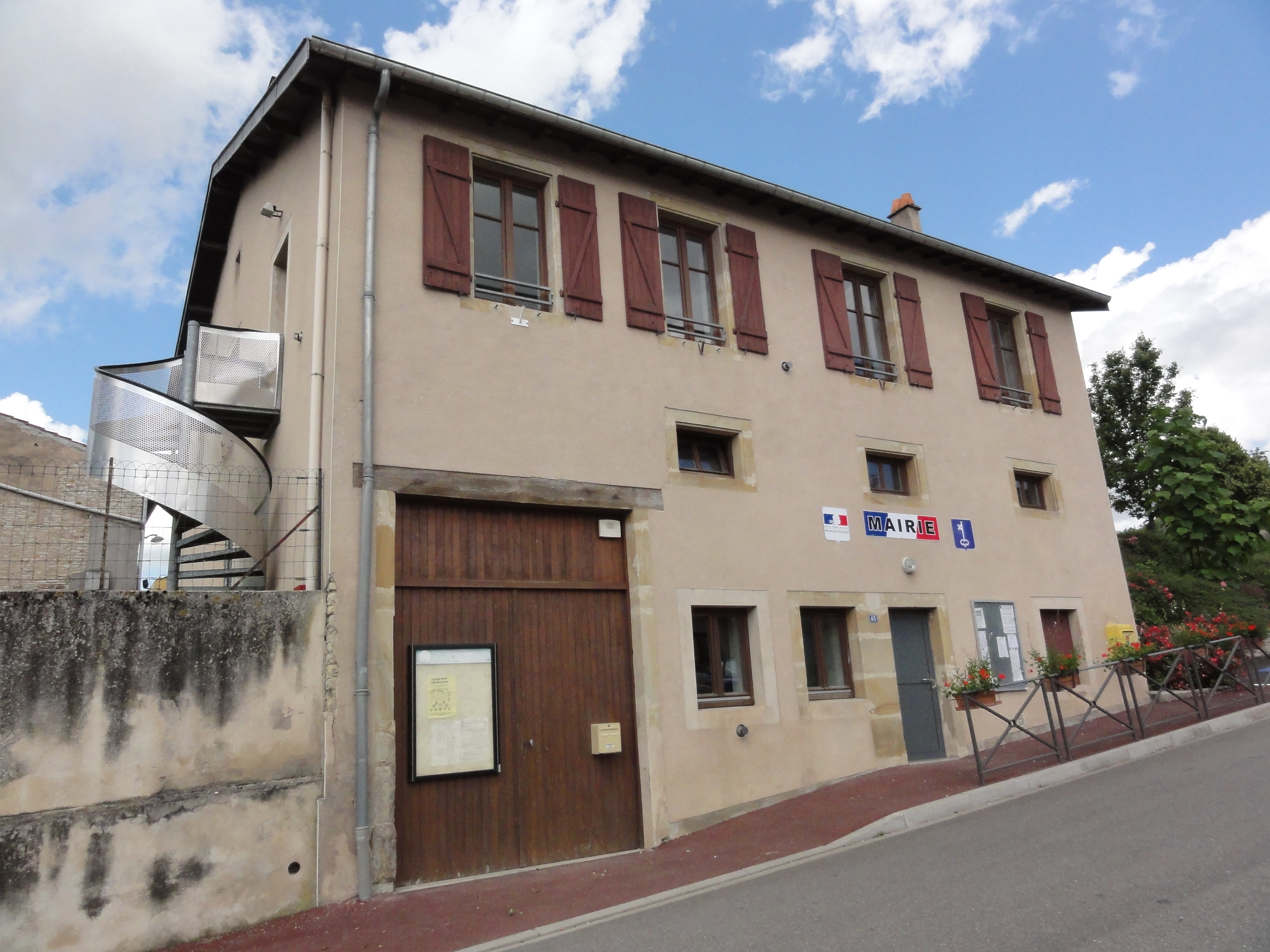
- The town hall in Bauzemont

- Coat of arms
- Location of Bauzemont
- Location within France Location within Grand Est
- Coordinates: 48°40′25″N 6°31′43″E
- Country: France
- Region: Grand Est
- Department: Meurthe-et-Moselle
- Arrondissement: Lunéville
- Canton: Lunéville-1
- Intercommunality: Pays du Sânon

Government
  - Mayor (2020–2026): Alain Loentgen
- Area^{1}: 6.32 km^{2} (2.44 sq mi)
- Elevation: 224 m (735 ft)
- Highest elevation: 287 m (942 ft)
- Lowest elevation: 216 m (709 ft)
- Population (2023): 154
  - Density: 24.4/km^{2} (63.1/sq mi)
- Time zone: UTC+01:00 (CET)
  - Summer (DST): UTC+02:00 (CEST)
- INSEE/Postal code: 54053 /54370
- ^{1} French Land Register data, which excludes lakes, ponds, glaciers > 1 km^{2} (0.386 sq mi or 247 acres) and river estuaries.

Bauzemont (French pronunciation: [bozmɔ̃]) is a commune in the Meurthe-et-Moselle department in northeastern France.

== Population ==
Historical population
Year	Pop.	±% p.a.
1968	151	—
1975	144	−0.68%
1982	131	−1.34%
1990	133	+0.19%
1999	129	−0.34%
2007	155	+2.32%
2012	147	−1.05%
2017	154	+0.93%
2023	154	+0.00%
Source: INSEE

== See also ==
- Communes of the Meurthe-et-Moselle department
