= Crion =

- Commune
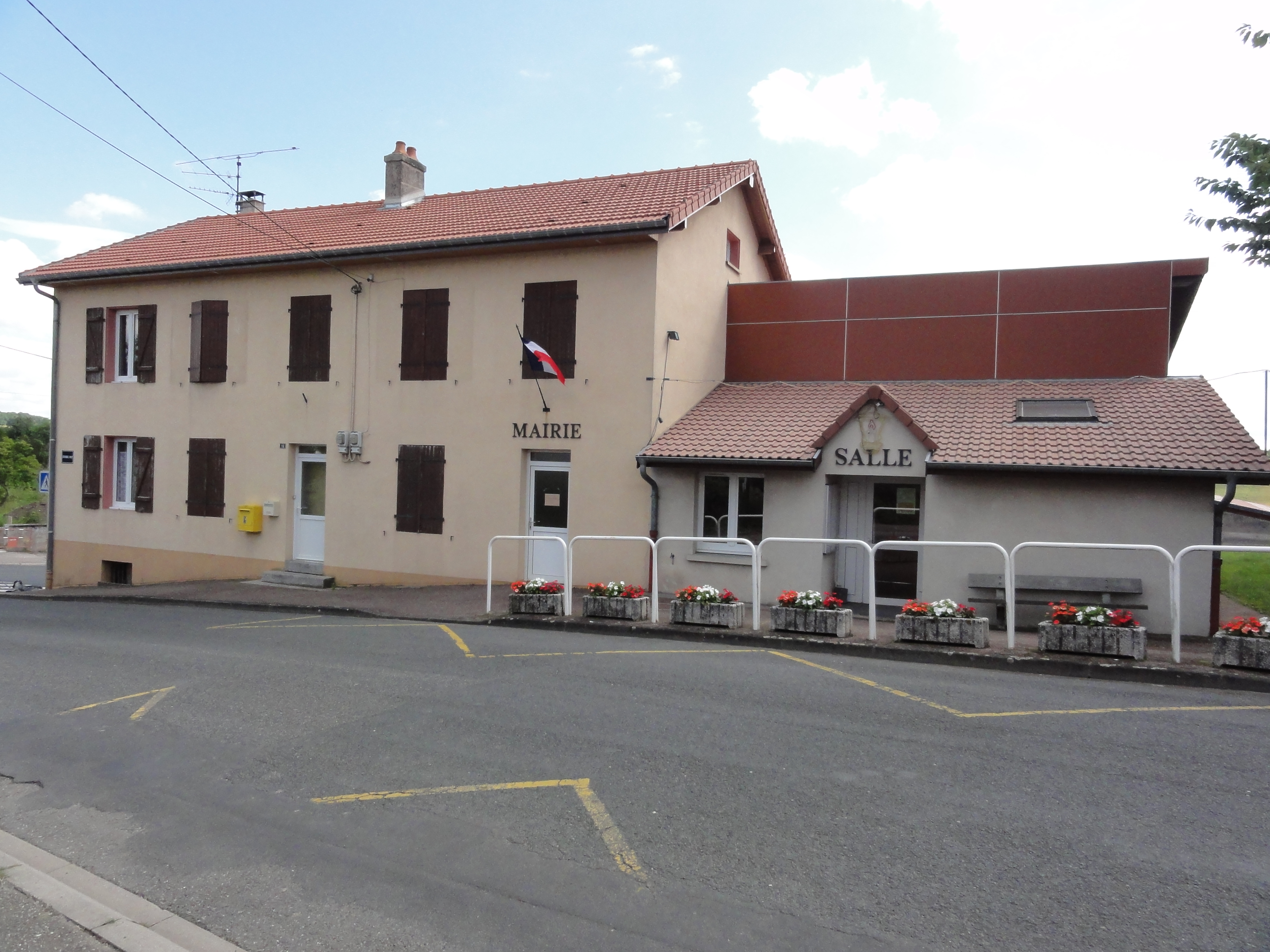
- The town hall in Crion

- Coat of arms
- Location of Crion
- Location within France Location within Grand Est
- Coordinates: 48°38′27″N 6°31′41″E
- Country: France
- Region: Grand Est
- Department: Meurthe-et-Moselle
- Arrondissement: Lunéville
- Canton: Lunéville-1

Government
  - Mayor (2020–2026): Marc Gerardin
- Area^{1}: 8.08 km^{2} (3.12 sq mi)
- Elevation: 250 m (820 ft)
- Highest elevation: 292 m (958 ft)
- Lowest elevation: 227 m (745 ft)
- Population (2023): 112
  - Density: 13.9/km^{2} (35.9/sq mi)
- Time zone: UTC+01:00 (CET)
  - Summer (DST): UTC+02:00 (CEST)
- INSEE/Postal code: 54147 /54300
- ^{1} French Land Register data, which excludes lakes, ponds, glaciers > 1 km^{2} (0.386 sq mi or 247 acres) and river estuaries.

Crion (French pronunciation: [kʁijɔ̃]) is a commune in the Meurthe-et-Moselle department in north-eastern France.

== See also ==
- Communes of the Meurthe-et-Moselle department
