= Hoéville =

- Commune
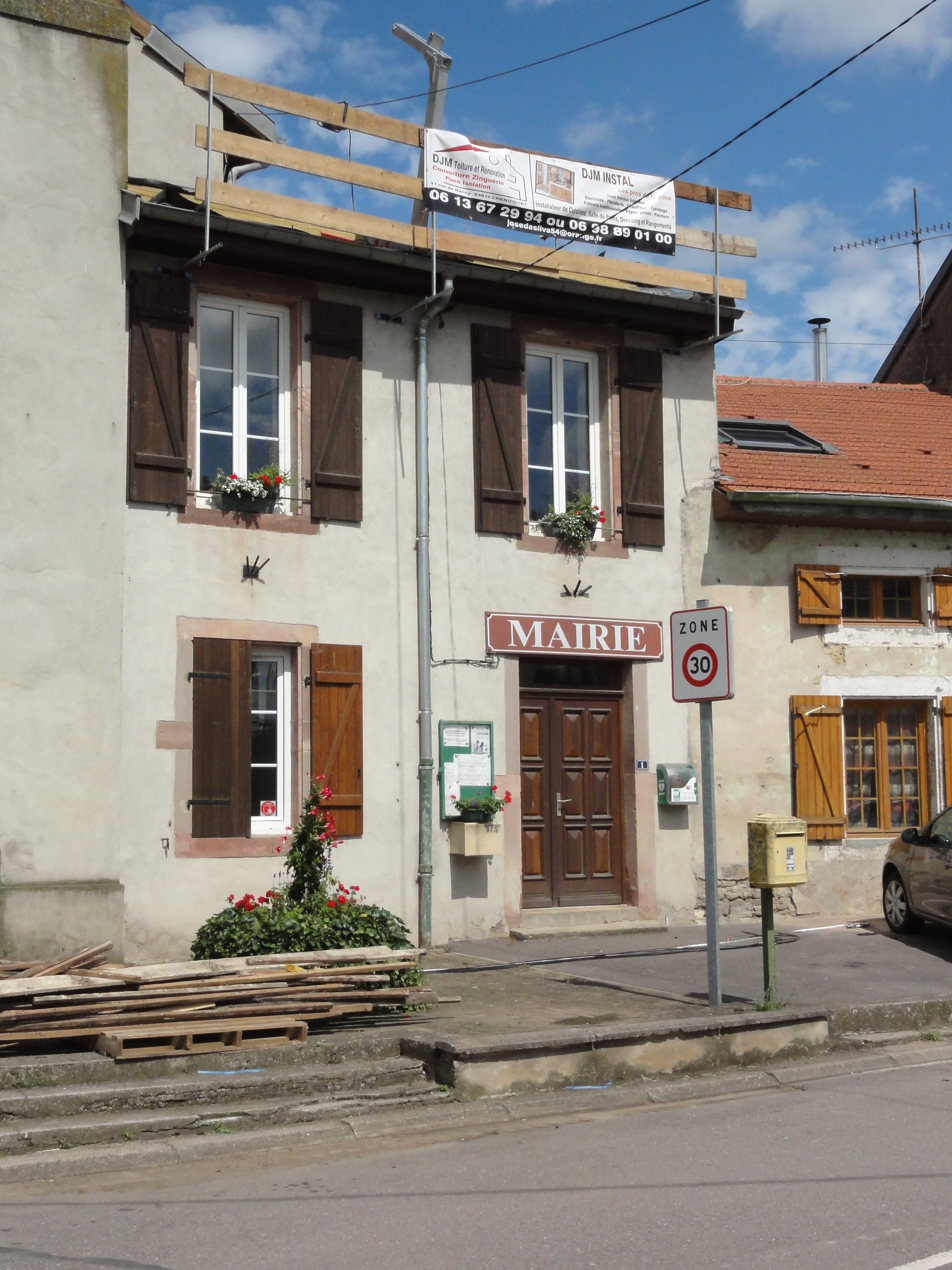
- The town hall in Hoéville

- Coat of arms
- Location of Hoéville
- Location within France Location within Grand Est
- Coordinates: 48°42′27″N 6°26′07″E
- Country: France
- Region: Grand Est
- Department: Meurthe-et-Moselle
- Arrondissement: Lunéville
- Canton: Lunéville-1
- Intercommunality: CC Pays du Sânon

Government
  - Mayor (2020–2026): François Marchand
- Area^{1}: 8.54 km^{2} (3.30 sq mi)
- Elevation: 270 m (890 ft)
- Highest elevation: 328 m (1,076 ft)
- Lowest elevation: 218 m (715 ft)
- Population (2023): 199
  - Density: 23.3/km^{2} (60.4/sq mi)
- Time zone: UTC+01:00 (CET)
  - Summer (DST): UTC+02:00 (CEST)
- INSEE/Postal code: 54262 /54370
- ^{1} French Land Register data, which excludes lakes, ponds, glaciers > 1 km^{2} (0.386 sq mi or 247 acres) and river estuaries.

Hoéville (French pronunciation: [ɔevil]) is a commune in the Meurthe-et-Moselle department in north-eastern France.

== See also ==
- Communes of the Meurthe-et-Moselle department
