= Serres, Meurthe-et-Moselle =

Serres
- Commune
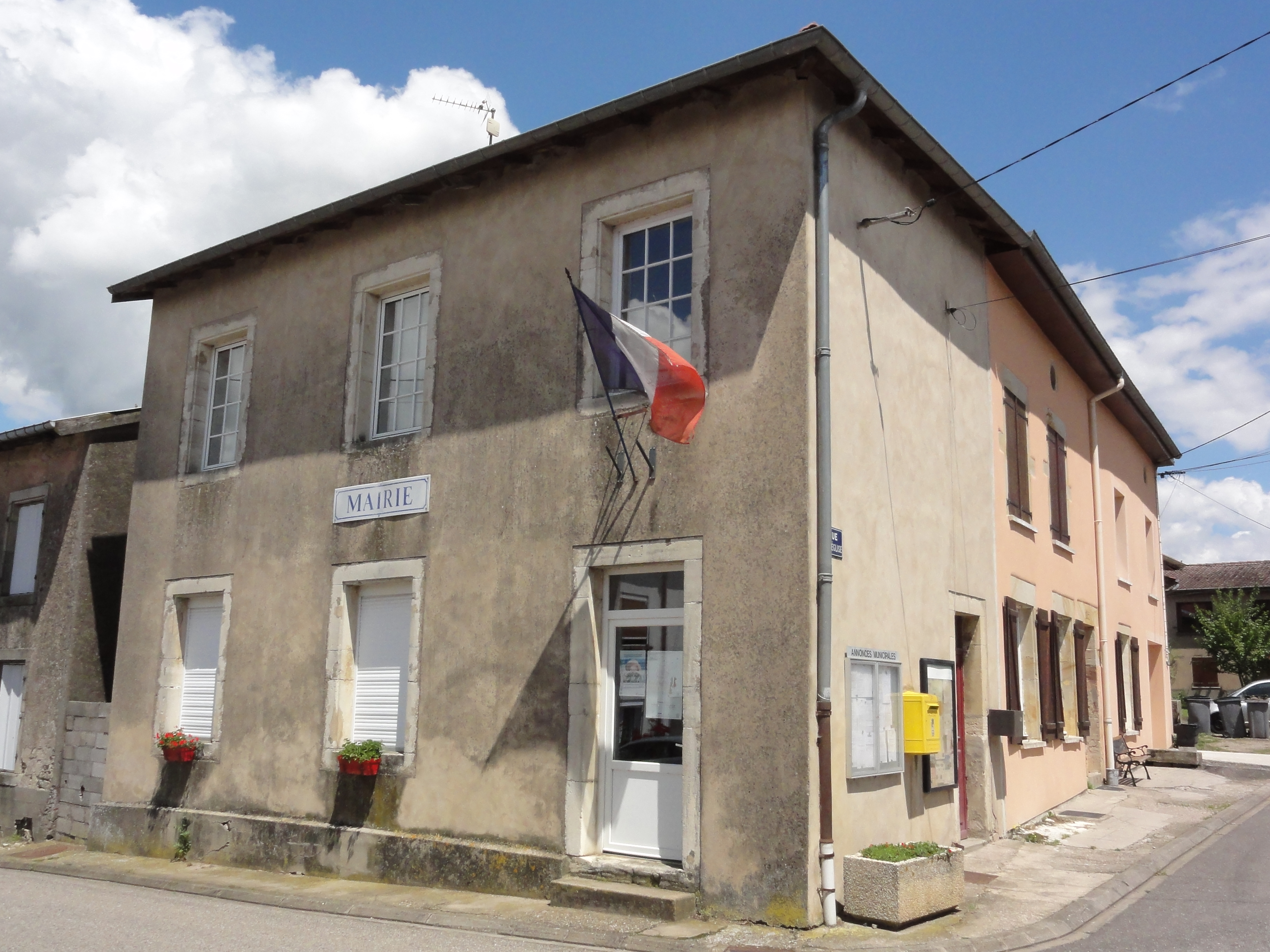
- The town hall in Serres

- Coat of arms
- Location of Serres
- Location within France Location within Grand Est
- Coordinates: 48°41′27″N 6°27′48″E
- Country: France
- Region: Grand Est
- Department: Meurthe-et-Moselle
- Arrondissement: Lunéville
- Canton: Lunéville-1
- Intercommunality: Pays du Sânon

Government
  - Mayor (2020–2026): Leendert Tukker
- Area^{1}: 15.55 km^{2} (6.00 sq mi)
- Elevation: 277 m (909 ft)
- Highest elevation: 324 m (1,063 ft)
- Lowest elevation: 215 m (705 ft)
- Population (2023): 254
  - Density: 16.3/km^{2} (42.3/sq mi)
- Time zone: UTC+01:00 (CET)
  - Summer (DST): UTC+02:00 (CEST)
- INSEE/Postal code: 54502 /54370
- ^{1} French Land Register data, which excludes lakes, ponds, glaciers > 1 km^{2} (0.386 sq mi or 247 acres) and river estuaries.

Serres (French pronunciation: [sɛʁ]) is a commune in the Meurthe-et-Moselle department in north-eastern France.

== Population ==
Historical population
Year	Pop.	±% p.a.
1968	227	—
1975	232	+0.31%
1982	204	−1.82%
1990	217	+0.78%
1999	249	+1.54%
2007	270	+1.02%
2012	245	−1.92%
2017	247	+0.16%
2023	254	+0.47%
Source: INSEE

== See also ==
- Communes of the Meurthe-et-Moselle department
