= Sionviller =

- Commune
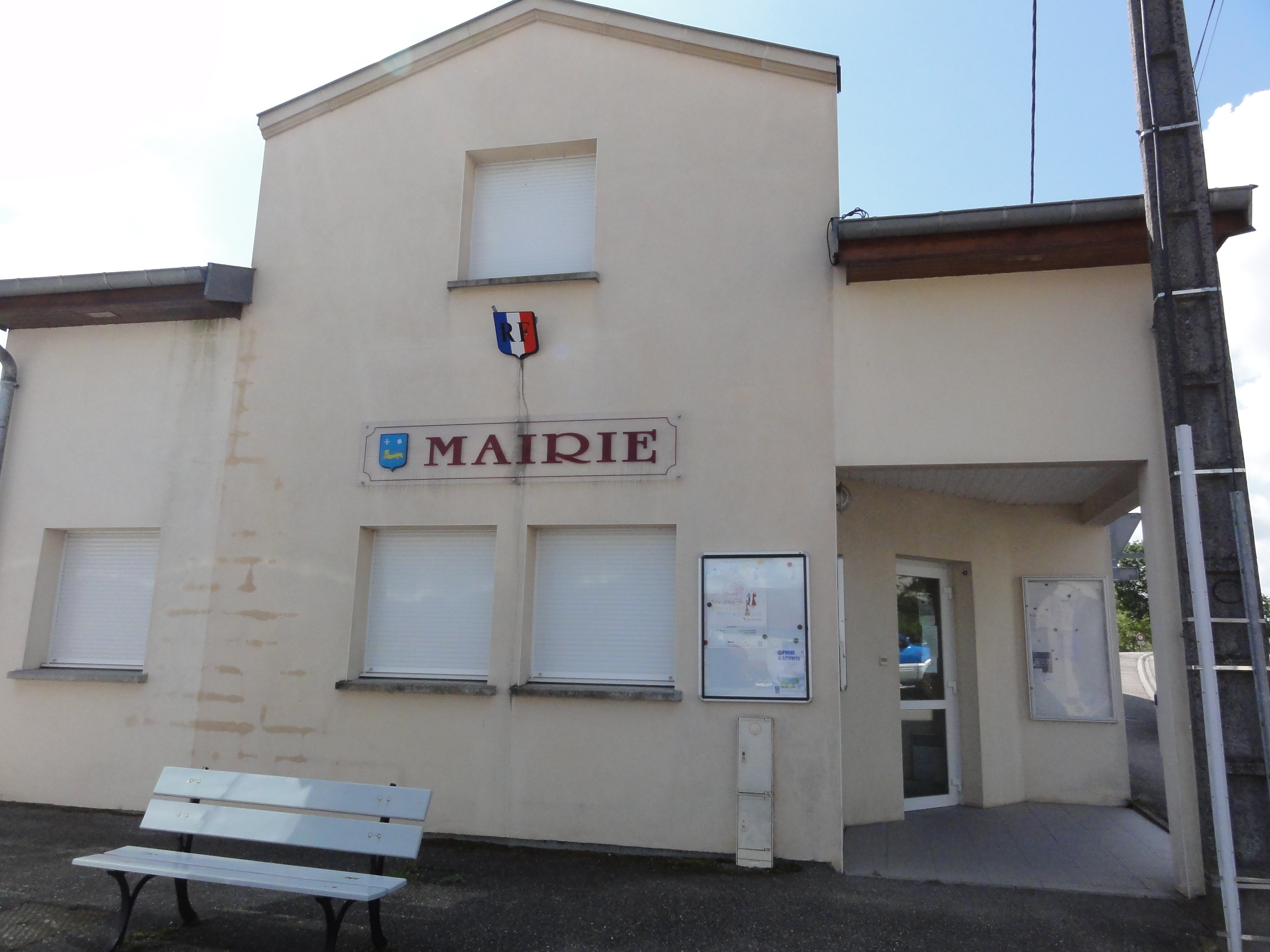
- The town hall in Sionviller

- Coat of arms
- Location of Sionviller
- Location within France Location within Grand Est
- Coordinates: 48°38′06″N 6°31′54″E
- Country: France
- Region: Grand Est
- Department: Meurthe-et-Moselle
- Arrondissement: Lunéville
- Canton: Lunéville-1
- Intercommunality: CC du Pays du Sânon

Government
  - Mayor (2020–2026): Jean-Luc Gravel
- Area^{1}: 6.74 km^{2} (2.60 sq mi)
- Elevation: 250 m (820 ft)
- Highest elevation: 297 m (974 ft)
- Lowest elevation: 239 m (784 ft)
- Population (2023): 102
  - Density: 15.1/km^{2} (39.2/sq mi)
- Time zone: UTC+01:00 (CET)
  - Summer (DST): UTC+02:00 (CEST)
- INSEE/Postal code: 54507 /54300
- ^{1} French Land Register data, which excludes lakes, ponds, glaciers > 1 km^{2} (0.386 sq mi or 247 acres) and river estuaries.

Sionviller (French pronunciation: [sjɔ̃vilɛʁ]) is a commune in the Meurthe-et-Moselle department in north-eastern France.

== Population ==
Historical population
Year	Pop.	±% p.a.
1968	50	—
1975	52	+0.56%
1982	81	+6.54%
1990	121	+5.14%
1999	117	−0.37%
2007	98	−2.19%
2012	114	+3.07%
2017	103	−2.01%
2023	102	−0.16%
Source: INSEE

== See also ==
- Communes of the Meurthe-et-Moselle department
