= Canton of Lunéville-1 =

Canton in Grand Est, France

Coordinates: 48.59°N 6.49°E

The canton of Lunéville-1 is an administrative division of the Meurthe-et-Moselle department, northeastern France. It was created at the French canton reorganisation which came into effect in March 2015. Its seat is in Lunéville.

It consists of the following communes:

1. Anthelupt
2. Bauzemont
3. Bienville-la-Petite
4. Bonviller
5. Courbesseaux
6. Crévic
7. Crion
8. Croismare
9. Deuxville
10. Dombasle-sur-Meurthe
11. Drouville
12. Einville-au-Jard
13. Flainval
14. Hénaménil
15. Hoéville
16. Hudiviller
17. Jolivet
18. Lunéville (partly)
19. Maixe
20. Raville-sur-Sânon
21. Serres
22. Sionviller
23. Sommerviller
24. Valhey
25. Varangéville
26. Vitrimont
