= Bienville-la-Petite =

- Commune
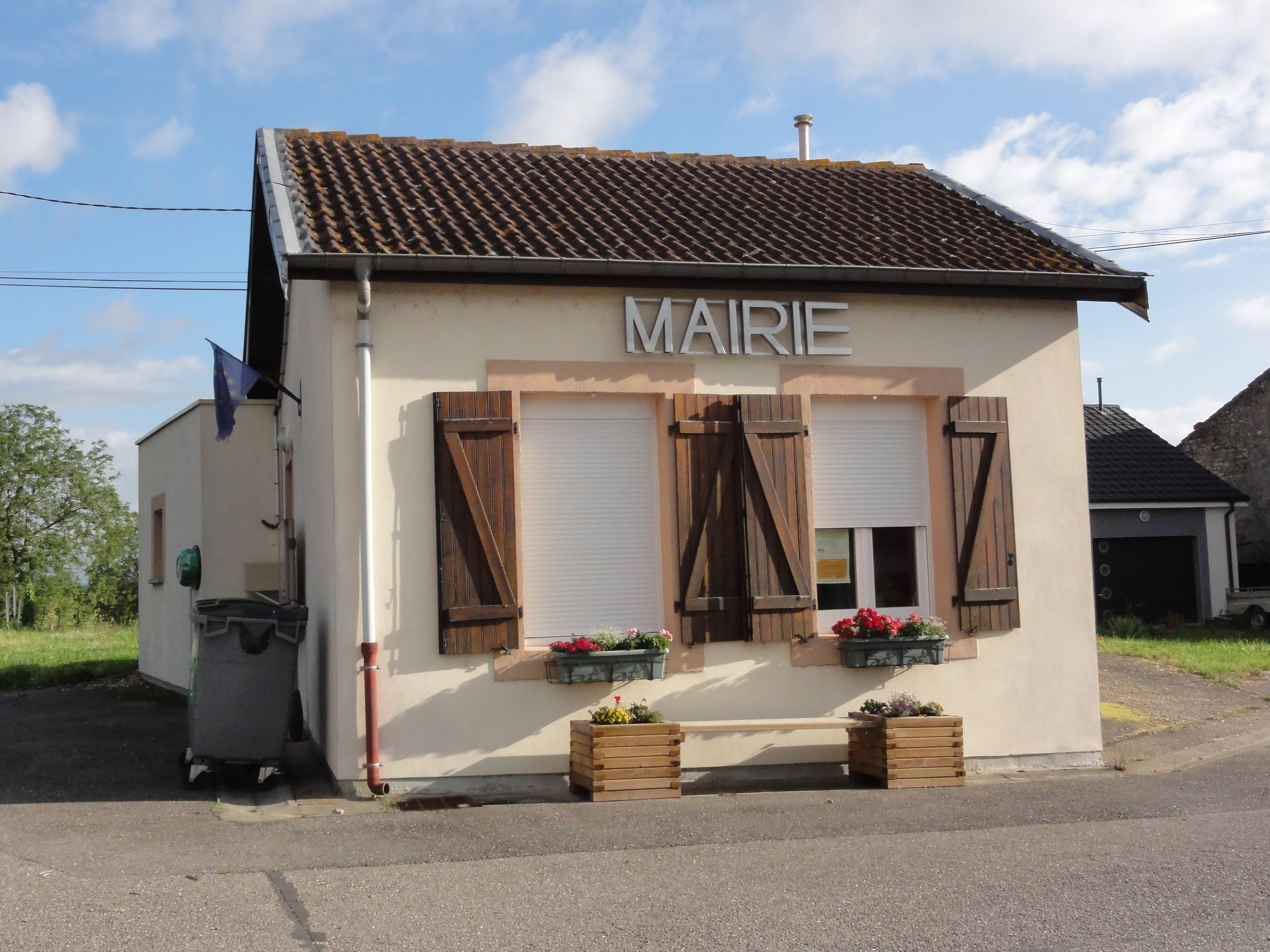
- The town hall in Bienville-la-Petite

- Coat of arms
- Location of Bienville-la-Petite
- Location within France Location within Grand Est
- Coordinates: 48°38′20″N 6°30′35″E
- Country: France
- Region: Grand Est
- Department: Meurthe-et-Moselle
- Arrondissement: Lunéville
- Canton: Lunéville-1
- Intercommunality: Pays du Sânon

Government
  - Mayor (2020–2026): Florence Duhay
- Area^{1}: 1.83 km^{2} (0.71 sq mi)
- Elevation: 220 m (720 ft)
- Highest elevation: 280 m (920 ft)
- Lowest elevation: 224 m (735 ft)
- Population (2023): 36
  - Density: 20/km^{2} (51/sq mi)
- Time zone: UTC+01:00 (CET)
  - Summer (DST): UTC+02:00 (CEST)
- INSEE/Postal code: 54074 /54300
- ^{1} French Land Register data, which excludes lakes, ponds, glaciers > 1 km^{2} (0.386 sq mi or 247 acres) and river estuaries.

Bienville-la-Petite (French pronunciation: [bjɛ̃vil la pətit]) is a commune in the Meurthe-et-Moselle department in northeastern France.

== Population ==
Historical population
Year	Pop.	±% p.a.
1968	44	—
1975	33	−4.03%
1982	27	−2.83%
1990	33	+2.54%
1999	27	−2.21%
2007	28	+0.46%
2012	29	+0.70%
2017	34	+3.23%
2023	36	+0.96%
Source: INSEE

== See also ==
- Communes of the Meurthe-et-Moselle department
