= Drouville =

- Commune
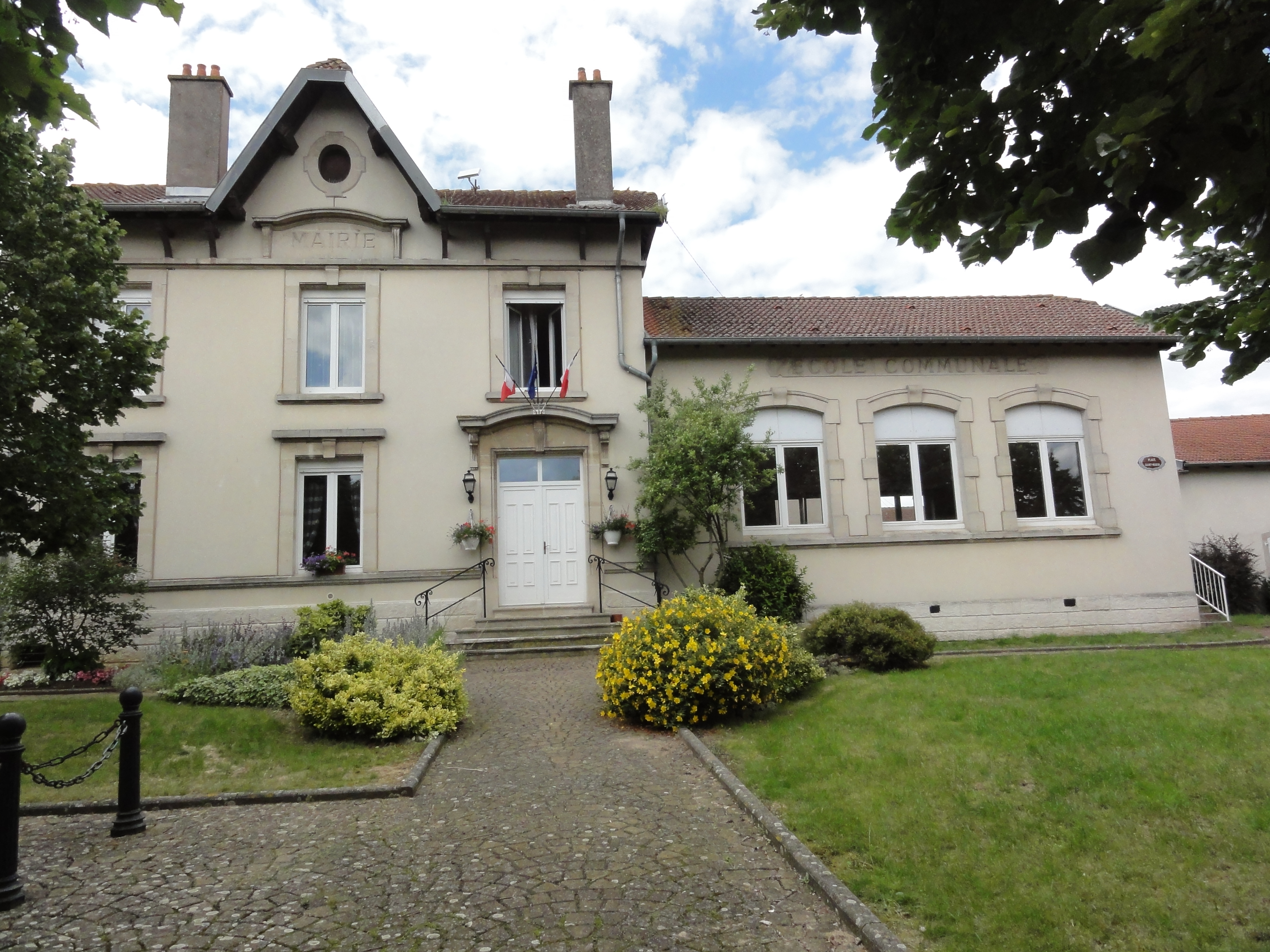
- The town hall and school in Drouville

- Coat of arms
- Location of Drouville
- Location within France Location within Grand Est
- Coordinates: 48°40′19″N 6°24′31″E
- Country: France
- Region: Grand Est
- Department: Meurthe-et-Moselle
- Arrondissement: Lunéville
- Canton: Lunéville-1
- Intercommunality: CC du Pays du Sânon

Government
  - Mayor (2020–2026): Didier Bourdon
- Area^{1}: 7.12 km^{2} (2.75 sq mi)
- Elevation: 245 m (804 ft)
- Highest elevation: 303 m (994 ft)
- Lowest elevation: 226 m (741 ft)
- Population (2023): 191
  - Density: 26.8/km^{2} (69.5/sq mi)
- Time zone: UTC+01:00 (CET)
  - Summer (DST): UTC+02:00 (CEST)
- INSEE/Postal code: 54173 /54370
- ^{1} French Land Register data, which excludes lakes, ponds, glaciers > 1 km^{2} (0.386 sq mi or 247 acres) and river estuaries.

Drouville (French pronunciation: [dʁuvil]) is a commune in the Meurthe-et-Moselle department in north-eastern France.

== See also ==
- Communes of the Meurthe-et-Moselle department
