= Crévic =

- Commune
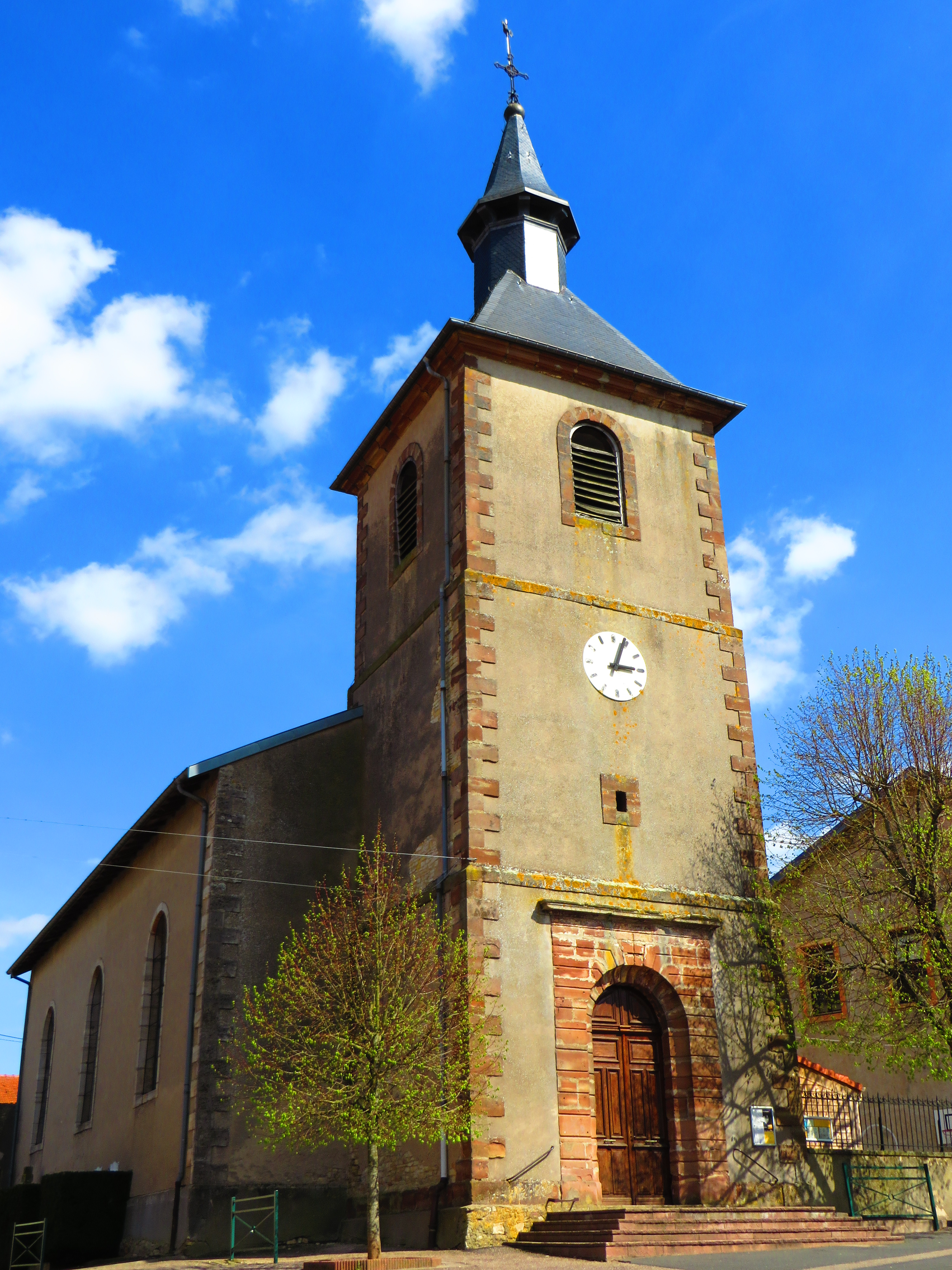
- The church in Crévic

- Coat of arms
- Location of Crévic
- Location within France Location within Grand Est
- Coordinates: 48°38′23″N 6°24′17″E
- Country: France
- Region: Grand Est
- Department: Meurthe-et-Moselle
- Arrondissement: Nancy
- Canton: Lunéville-1
- Intercommunality: Pays du Sel et du Vermois

Government
  - Mayor (2020–2026): Chantal Didier
- Area^{1}: 10.69 km^{2} (4.13 sq mi)
- Elevation: 220 m (720 ft)
- Highest elevation: 315 m (1,033 ft)
- Lowest elevation: 205 m (673 ft)
- Population (2023): 935
  - Density: 87.5/km^{2} (227/sq mi)
- Time zone: UTC+01:00 (CET)
  - Summer (DST): UTC+02:00 (CEST)
- INSEE/Postal code: 54145 /54110
- ^{1} French Land Register data, which excludes lakes, ponds, glaciers > 1 km^{2} (0.386 sq mi or 247 acres) and river estuaries.

Crévic (French pronunciation: [kʁevik]) is a commune in the Meurthe-et-Moselle department in north-eastern France.

== See also ==
- Communes of the Meurthe-et-Moselle department
