= Sommerviller =

- Commune
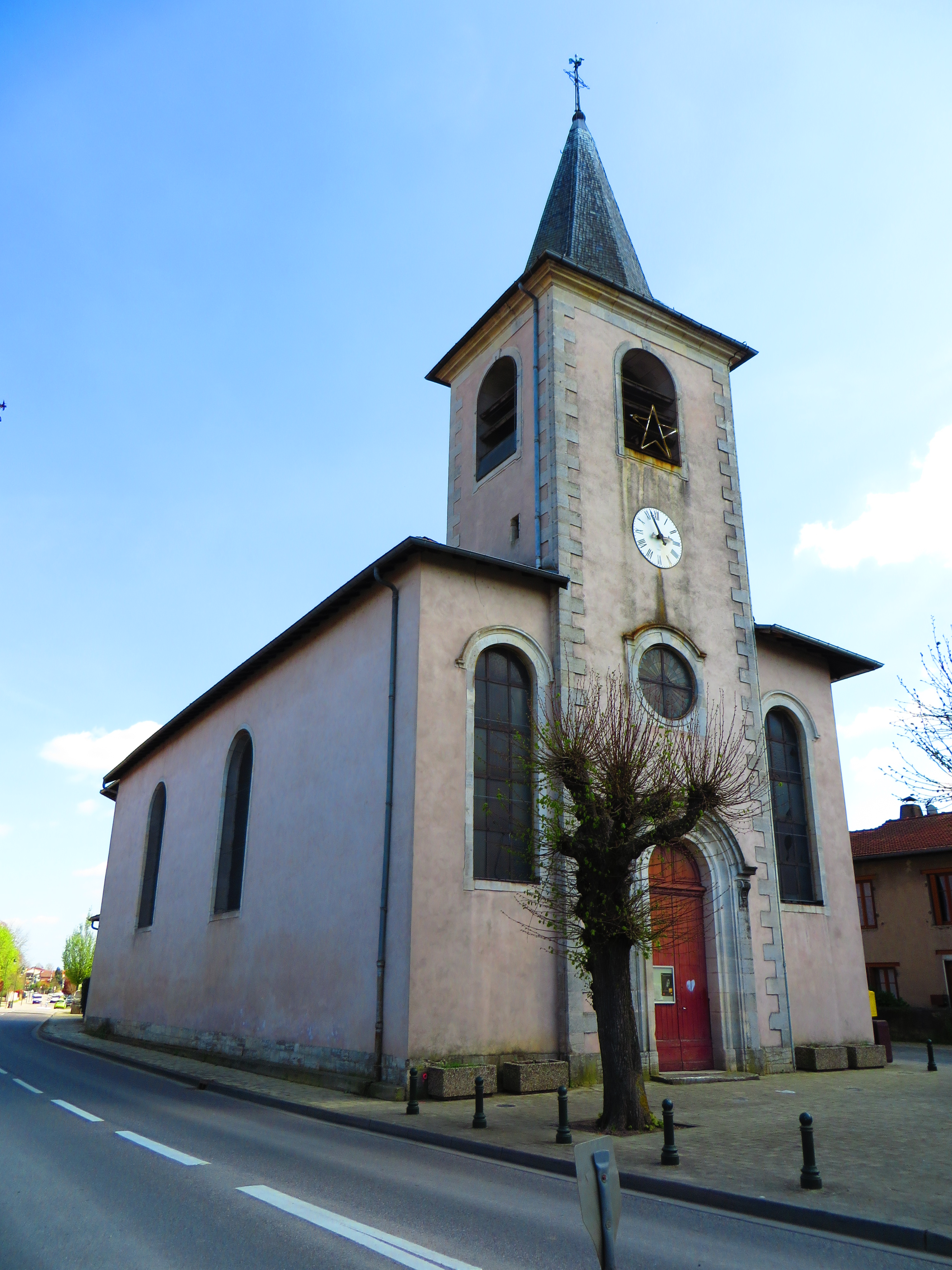
- The church in Sommerviller

- Coat of arms
- Location of Sommerviller
- Location within France Location within Grand Est
- Coordinates: 48°37′57″N 6°22′38″E
- Country: France
- Region: Grand Est
- Department: Meurthe-et-Moselle
- Arrondissement: Nancy
- Canton: Lunéville-1
- Intercommunality: CC des Pays du Sel et du Vermois

Government
  - Mayor (2020–2026): Stéphane Lejeune
- Area^{1}: 3.81 km^{2} (1.47 sq mi)
- Elevation: 211 m (692 ft)
- Highest elevation: 320 m (1,050 ft)
- Lowest elevation: 207 m (679 ft)
- Population (2023): 1,010
  - Density: 265/km^{2} (687/sq mi)
- Time zone: UTC+01:00 (CET)
  - Summer (DST): UTC+02:00 (CEST)
- INSEE/Postal code: 54509 /54110
- ^{1} French Land Register data, which excludes lakes, ponds, glaciers > 1 km^{2} (0.386 sq mi or 247 acres) and river estuaries.

Sommerviller is a commune in the Meurthe-et-Moselle department in north-eastern France.

== Population ==
Historical population
Year	Pop.	±% p.a.
1968	838	—
1975	978	+2.23%
1982	953	−0.37%
1990	955	+0.03%
1999	954	−0.01%
2007	919	−0.47%
2012	922	+0.07%
2017	990	+1.43%
2023	1,010	+0.33%
Source: INSEE

== See also ==
- Communes of the Meurthe-et-Moselle department
