= Bonviller =

- Commune
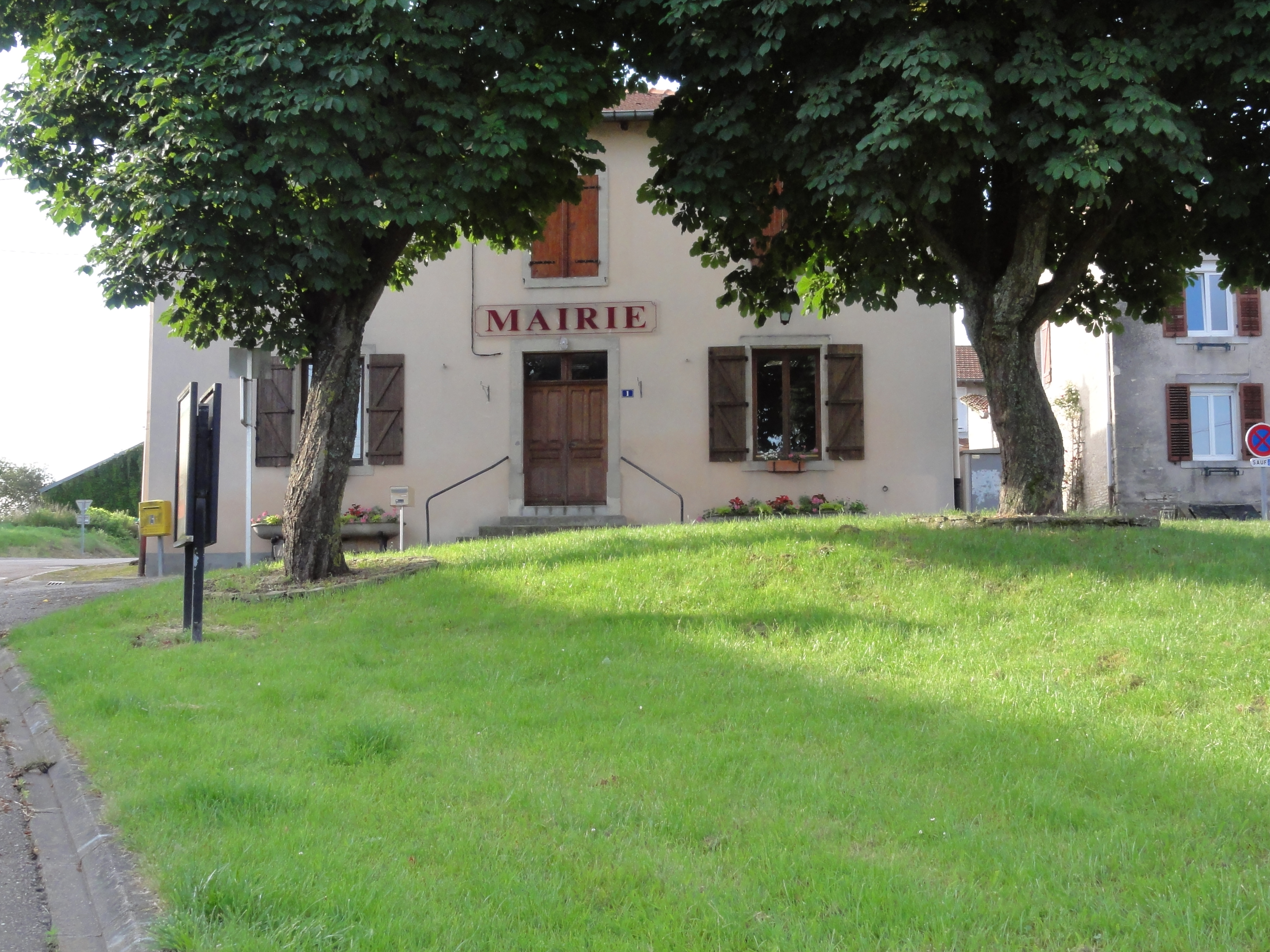
- The town hall in Bonviller

- Coat of arms
- Location of Bonviller
- Location within France Location within Grand Est
- Coordinates: 48°38′03″N 6°29′53″E
- Country: France
- Region: Grand Est
- Department: Meurthe-et-Moselle
- Arrondissement: Lunéville
- Canton: Lunéville-1
- Intercommunality: Pays du Sânon

Government
  - Mayor (2020–2026): Rachel Kaiser
- Area^{1}: 5.04 km^{2} (1.95 sq mi)
- Elevation: 250 m (820 ft)
- Highest elevation: 294 m (965 ft)
- Lowest elevation: 225 m (738 ft)
- Population (2023): 183
  - Density: 36.3/km^{2} (94.0/sq mi)
- Time zone: UTC+01:00 (CET)
  - Summer (DST): UTC+02:00 (CEST)
- INSEE/Postal code: 54083 /54300
- ^{1} French Land Register data, which excludes lakes, ponds, glaciers > 1 km^{2} (0.386 sq mi or 247 acres) and river estuaries.

Bonviller (French pronunciation: [bɔ̃vile]) is a commune in the Meurthe-et-Moselle department in northeastern France.

== Population ==
Historical population
Year	Pop.	±% p.a.
1968	149	—
1975	152	+0.29%
1982	155	+0.28%
1990	165	+0.78%
1999	173	+0.53%
2007	183	+0.70%
2012	185	+0.22%
2017	183	−0.22%
2023	183	+0.00%
Source: INSEE

== See also ==
- Communes of the Meurthe-et-Moselle department
