= Manonviller =

- Commune
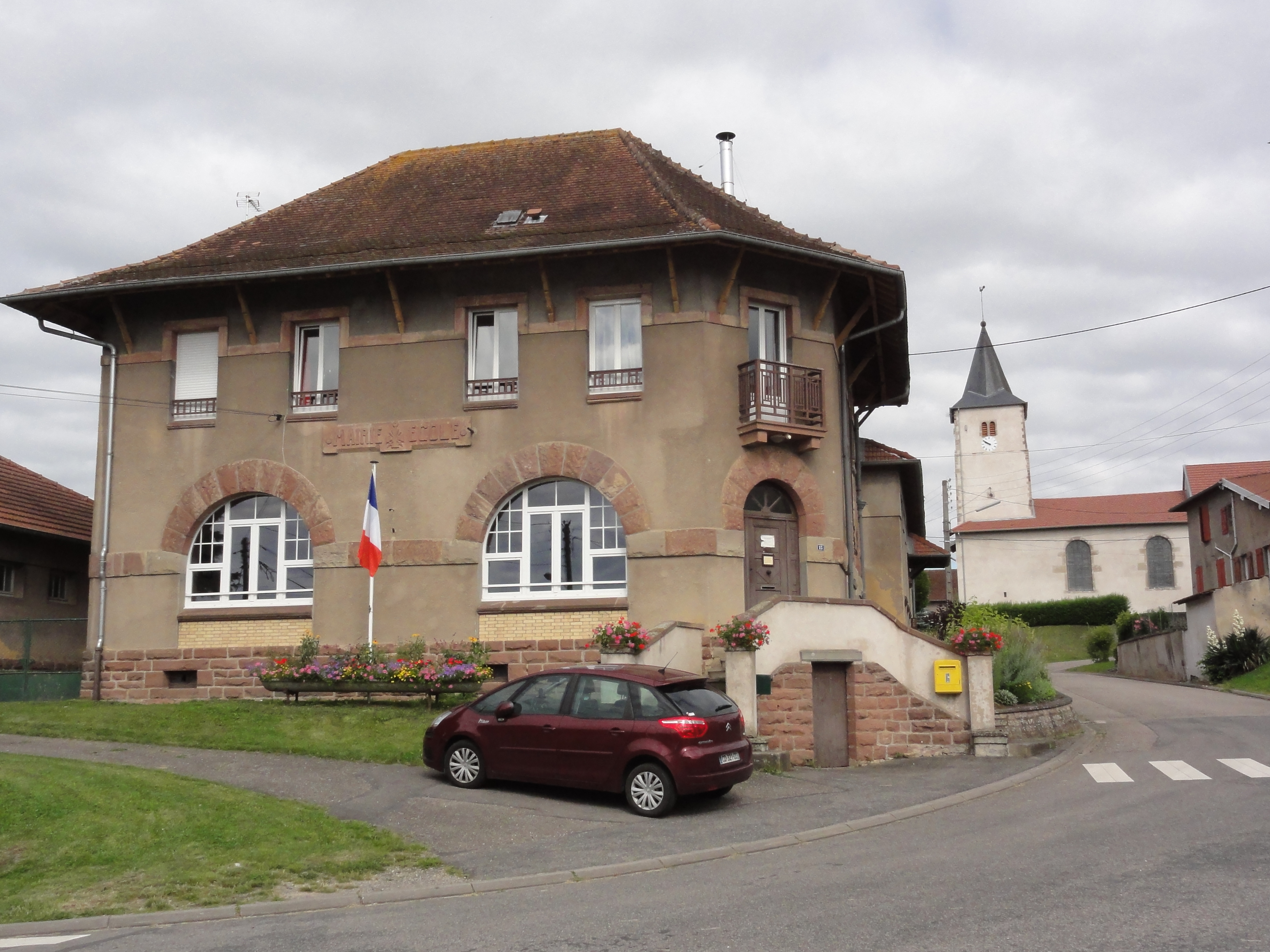
- The town hall in Manonviller

- Coat of arms
- Location of Manonviller
- Location within France Location within Grand Est
- Coordinates: 48°35′02″N 6°39′06″E
- Country: France
- Region: Grand Est
- Department: Meurthe-et-Moselle
- Arrondissement: Lunéville
- Canton: Baccarat
- Intercommunality: CC Territoire de Lunéville à Baccarat

Government
  - Mayor (2020–2026): Frédéric Privet
- Area^{1}: 6.98 km^{2} (2.69 sq mi)
- Elevation: 257 m (843 ft)
- Highest elevation: 318 m (1,043 ft)
- Lowest elevation: 232 m (761 ft)
- Population (2023): 172
  - Density: 24.6/km^{2} (63.8/sq mi)
- Time zone: UTC+01:00 (CET)
  - Summer (DST): UTC+02:00 (CEST)
- INSEE/Postal code: 54349 /54300
- ^{1} French Land Register data, which excludes lakes, ponds, glaciers > 1 km^{2} (0.386 sq mi or 247 acres) and river estuaries.

Manonviller (French pronunciation: [manɔ̃vile]) is a commune in the Meurthe-et-Moselle department in north-eastern France.

== See also ==
- Communes of the Meurthe-et-Moselle department
