= Hénaménil =

- Commune
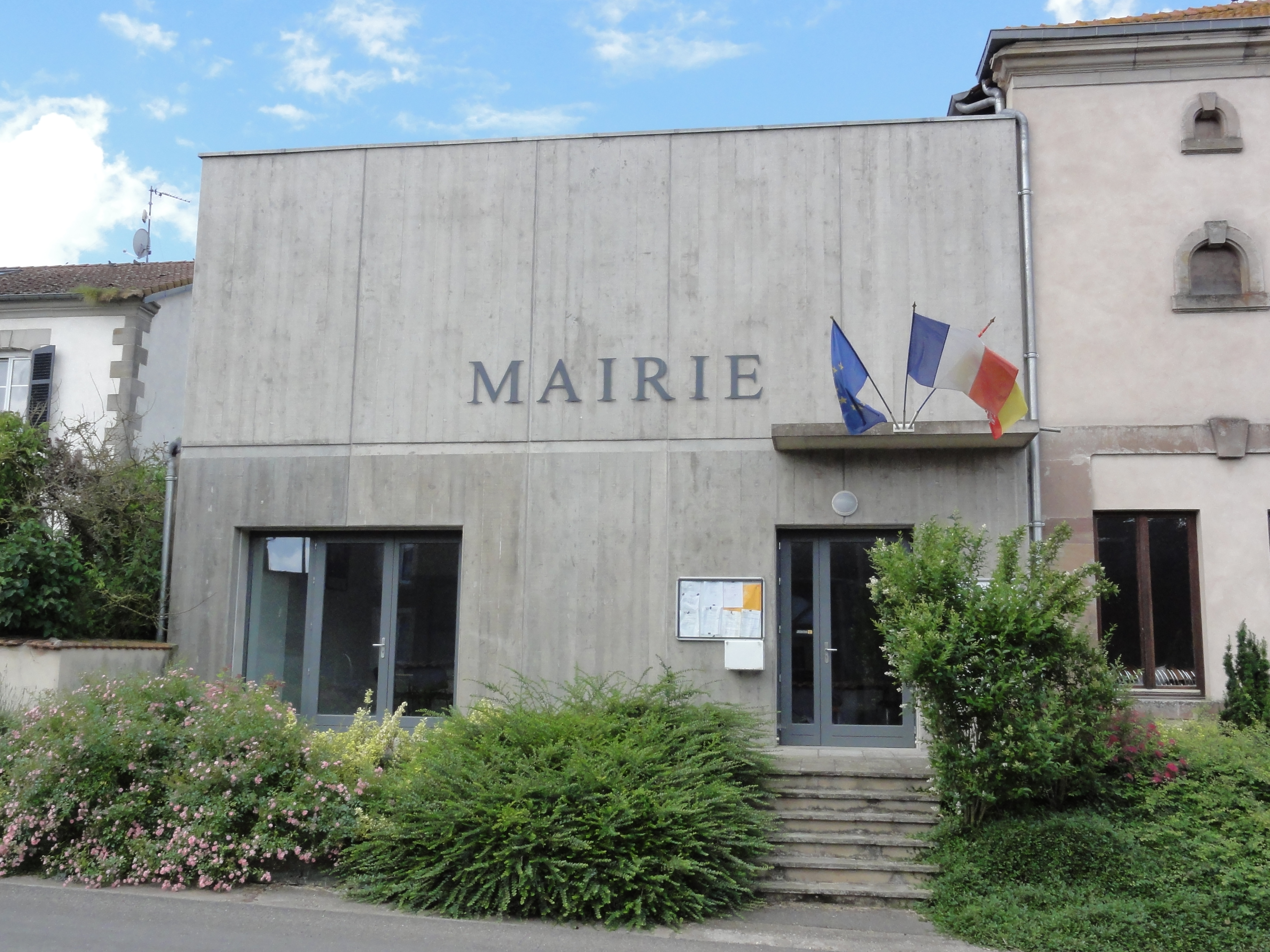
- The town hall in Hénaménil

- Coat of arms
- Location of Hénaménil
- Location within France Location within Grand Est
- Coordinates: 48°40′18″N 6°33′34″E
- Country: France
- Region: Grand Est
- Department: Meurthe-et-Moselle
- Arrondissement: Lunéville
- Canton: Lunéville-1
- Intercommunality: CC du Pays du Sânon

Government
  - Mayor (2020–2026): Carole Cuny
- Area^{1}: 14.21 km^{2} (5.49 sq mi)
- Elevation: 242 m (794 ft)
- Highest elevation: 302 m (991 ft)
- Lowest elevation: 218 m (715 ft)
- Population (2023): 147
  - Density: 10.3/km^{2} (26.8/sq mi)
- Time zone: UTC+01:00 (CET)
  - Summer (DST): UTC+02:00 (CEST)
- INSEE/Postal code: 54258 /54370
- ^{1} French Land Register data, which excludes lakes, ponds, glaciers > 1 km^{2} (0.386 sq mi or 247 acres) and river estuaries.

Hénaménil (French pronunciation: [enamenil]) is a commune in the Meurthe-et-Moselle department in north-eastern France.

== See also ==
- Communes of the Meurthe-et-Moselle department
