= Jolivet, Meurthe-et-Moselle =

Jolivet
- Commune
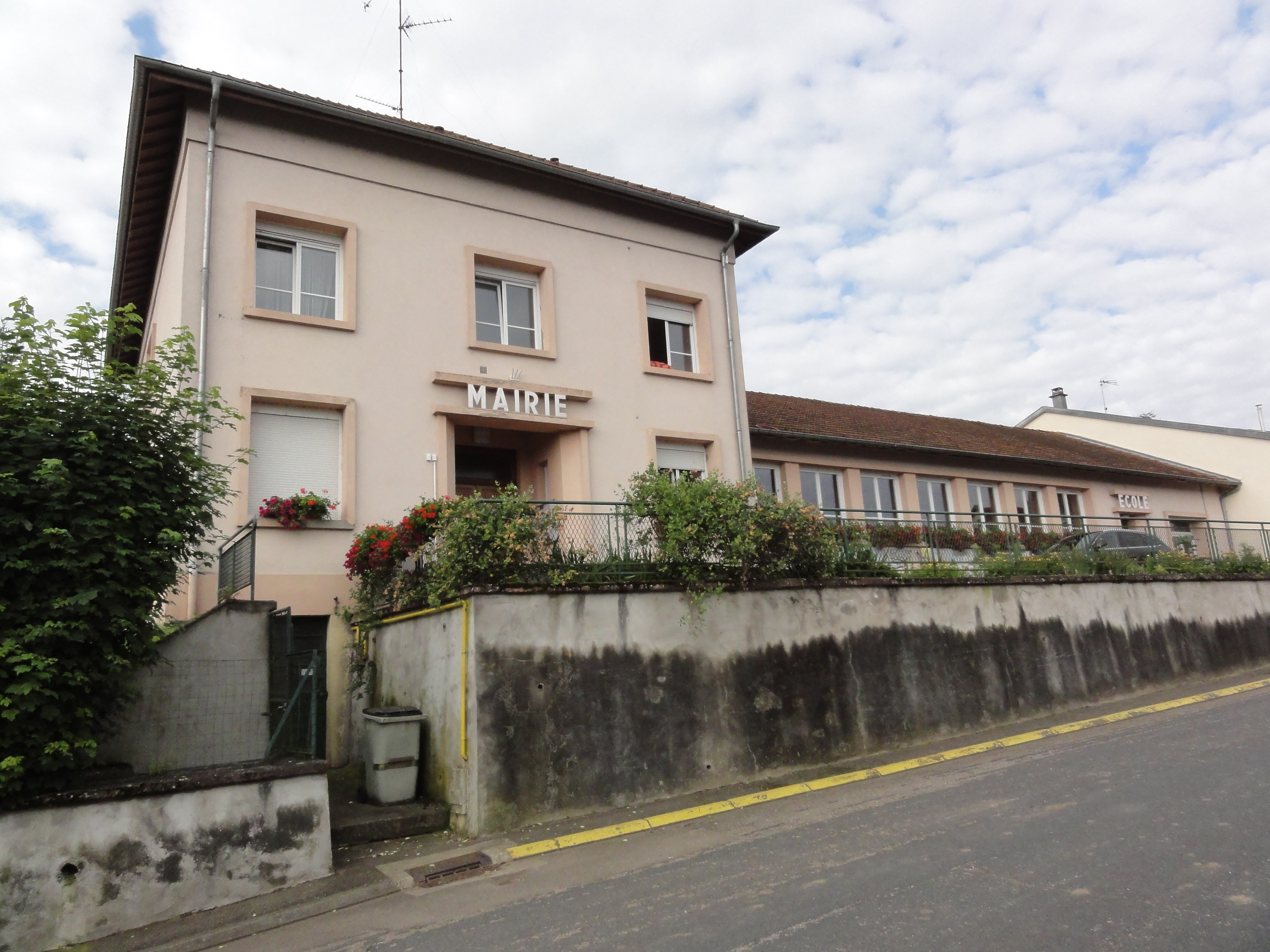
- The town hall and school in Jolivet

- Coat of arms
- Location of Jolivet
- Location within France Location within Grand Est
- Coordinates: 48°36′22″N 6°30′29″E
- Country: France
- Region: Grand Est
- Department: Meurthe-et-Moselle
- Arrondissement: Lunéville
- Canton: Lunéville-1
- Intercommunality: CC Territoire de Lunéville à Baccarat

Government
  - Mayor (2020–2026): Serge Descle
- Area^{1}: 7.2 km^{2} (2.8 sq mi)
- Elevation: 220 m (720 ft)
- Highest elevation: 295 m (968 ft)
- Lowest elevation: 221 m (725 ft)
- Population (2023): 888
  - Density: 120/km^{2} (320/sq mi)
- Time zone: UTC+01:00 (CET)
  - Summer (DST): UTC+02:00 (CEST)
- INSEE/Postal code: 54281 /54300
- ^{1} French Land Register data, which excludes lakes, ponds, glaciers > 1 km^{2} (0.386 sq mi or 247 acres) and river estuaries.

Jolivet (French pronunciation: [ʒɔlivɛ]) is a commune in the Meurthe-et-Moselle department in north-eastern France.

== See also ==
- Communes of the Meurthe-et-Moselle department
