= Baccarat, Meurthe-et-Moselle =

Administrative division in Grand Est, France

Baccarat
- Commune
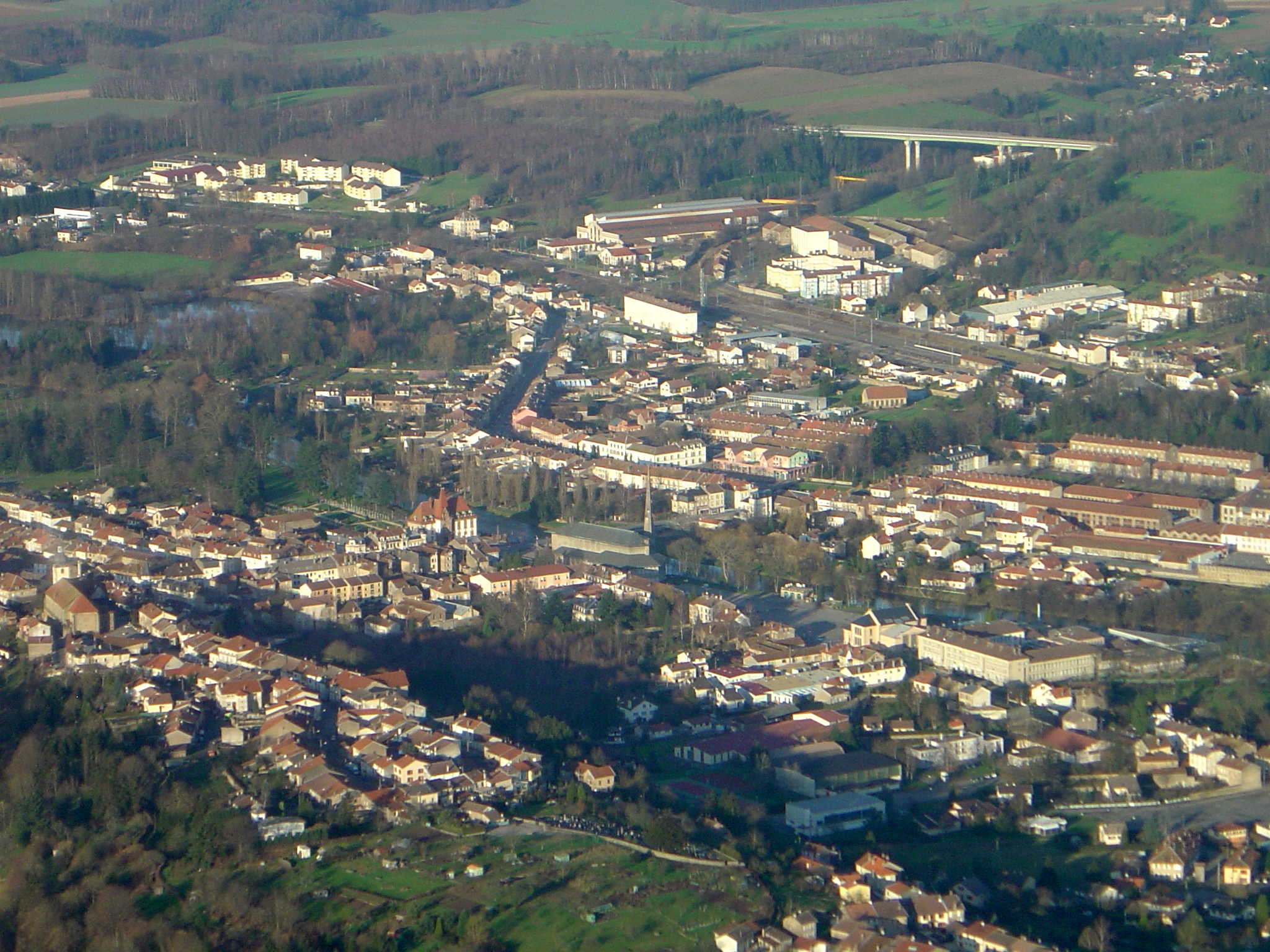
- An aerial view of Baccarat

- Coat of arms
- Location of Baccarat
- Location within France Location within Grand Est
- Coordinates: 48°26′57″N 6°44′20″E
- Country: France
- Region: Grand Est
- Department: Meurthe-et-Moselle
- Arrondissement: Lunéville
- Canton: Baccarat
- Intercommunality: Territoire de Lunéville à Baccarat

Government
  - Mayor (2020–2026): Christian Gex
- Area^{1}: 13.53 km^{2} (5.22 sq mi)
- Elevation: 275 m (902 ft)
- Highest elevation: 365 m (1,198 ft)
- Lowest elevation: 257 m (843 ft)
- Population (2023): 4,089
  - Density: 302.2/km^{2} (782.7/sq mi)
- Time zone: UTC+01:00 (CET)
  - Summer (DST): UTC+02:00 (CEST)
- INSEE/Postal code: 54039 /54120
- ^{1} French Land Register data, which excludes lakes, ponds, glaciers > 1 km^{2} (0.386 sq mi or 247 acres) and river estuaries.

Baccarat (IPA: [bakaʁa]; German: Burgambach) is a town and commune in the Meurthe-et-Moselle department in the Grand Est region of north-eastern France.

The commune has been awarded three flowers by the National Council of Towns and Villages in Bloom in the Competition of cities and villages in Bloom.

== Geography ==
Baccarat lies in the district (arrondissement) of Lunéville in the department of Meurthe-et-Moselle.

Baccarat is located some 25 km south-east of Lunéville and 30 km north-west of Saint-Dié-des-Vosges in the Meurthe river valley between the Deneuvre plateau and the wooded hills of Grammont. Access to the commune is by the Route nationale N59 from Bertrichamps in the south-east which passes through the heart of the commune east of the town and continues north-west to join the N333 south-east of Lunéville. The D590 also goes from Bertrichamps and passes through the town continuing north-west to Azerailles. The D19 goes north from the village to Gélacourt. The D935 goes north-east from the town to Merviller and also south-west, changing to the D435 at the departmental border, to Ménil-sur-Belvitte. A railway also passes through the commune with a station near the town and the railway line coming from Azerailles in the north-west continuing to Bertrichamps in the south-east. The commune has a large forest in the east with the rest of the commune mixed forest and farmland. The Meurthe river passes through the commune and the town from the south-east flowing north—west to eventually join the Moselle at Custines. The Ruisseau des Bingottes rises east of the commune and joins the Meurthe in the south of the commune.

== History ==
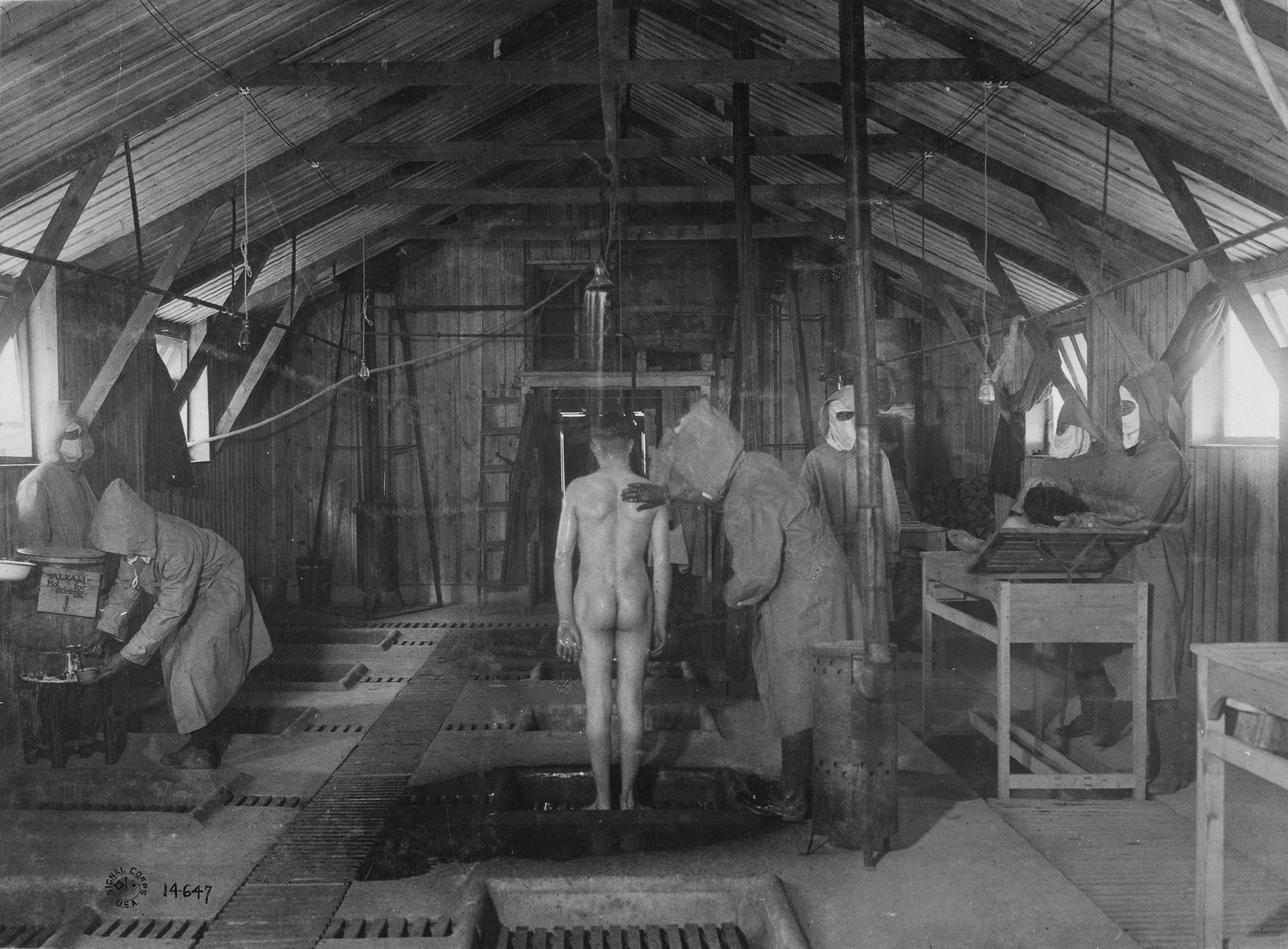
American Hospital No. 2 in Baccarat specialised in the treatment of patients "gassed" by chemical weapons during the First World War, 8 June 1918

Baccarat was originally a suburb of the city of Deneuvre which has Roman origins. The name Baccarat comes perhaps from Bacchi-ara ("Altar of Bacchus") which was the name of a Roman castellum of which there remains a relic called the Tower of Bacha on the heights of Deneuvre.

The Castellany belonged to the Diocese of Metz. In 1305 Henri, first lord of Blâmont from the House of Salm, dedicated Deneuvre for the Bishop of Metz and, to ensure its safety, he built the Tower of Voués at the bottom of the spur. A suburb formed at its foot: this was the origin of Baccarat (which has been spelt Bacquarat, Bakarroit, Beckarrat, and Backarrat). The name Baccarat appeared for the first time in 1291.

In 1459 the city was best known for its drapers as well as wine. Louis XV authorized the creation of a glassworks in 1764 at the instigation of the Bishop of Metz who was anxious to sell the important local production of firewood. A glassworks named Antoine Renaut responded to the authorisation. The works became a crystal glassworks in 1817 and was sold to the Compagnie des Cristalleries in 1881 subsequently achieving worldwide fame under the name of Baccarat. The growing number of workers enabled the development of the commune with the construction of housing, schools, shops, roads, and small industries but the war marked a halt to this development.

On the eve of the First World War the city was home to the 20th Batailion of Foot Chasseurs at the Haxo barracks - some buildings of which remain today. The period between the two world wars was marked by the construction of the church, the bridge, and the town hall (1924). During the Second World War there was much damage to the city including the destruction of the church in October 1944. Liberated by the French 2nd Armoured Division on 31 October 1944, the city resumed its industrial expansion in 1945. The reconstruction of the church was done in 1953.

=== Heraldry ===
Arms of Baccarat	These are the Arms of the chapter of the cathedral at Metz who owned the lordship, together with a stemmed glass symbolising the crystal glass industry. Blazon: Party per fesse, 1 Gules a dexter arm hand Carnation armed Argent holding a sword the same hilt and pommel Or between two roundels the same; 2 Azure a goblet Argent.

== Administration ==
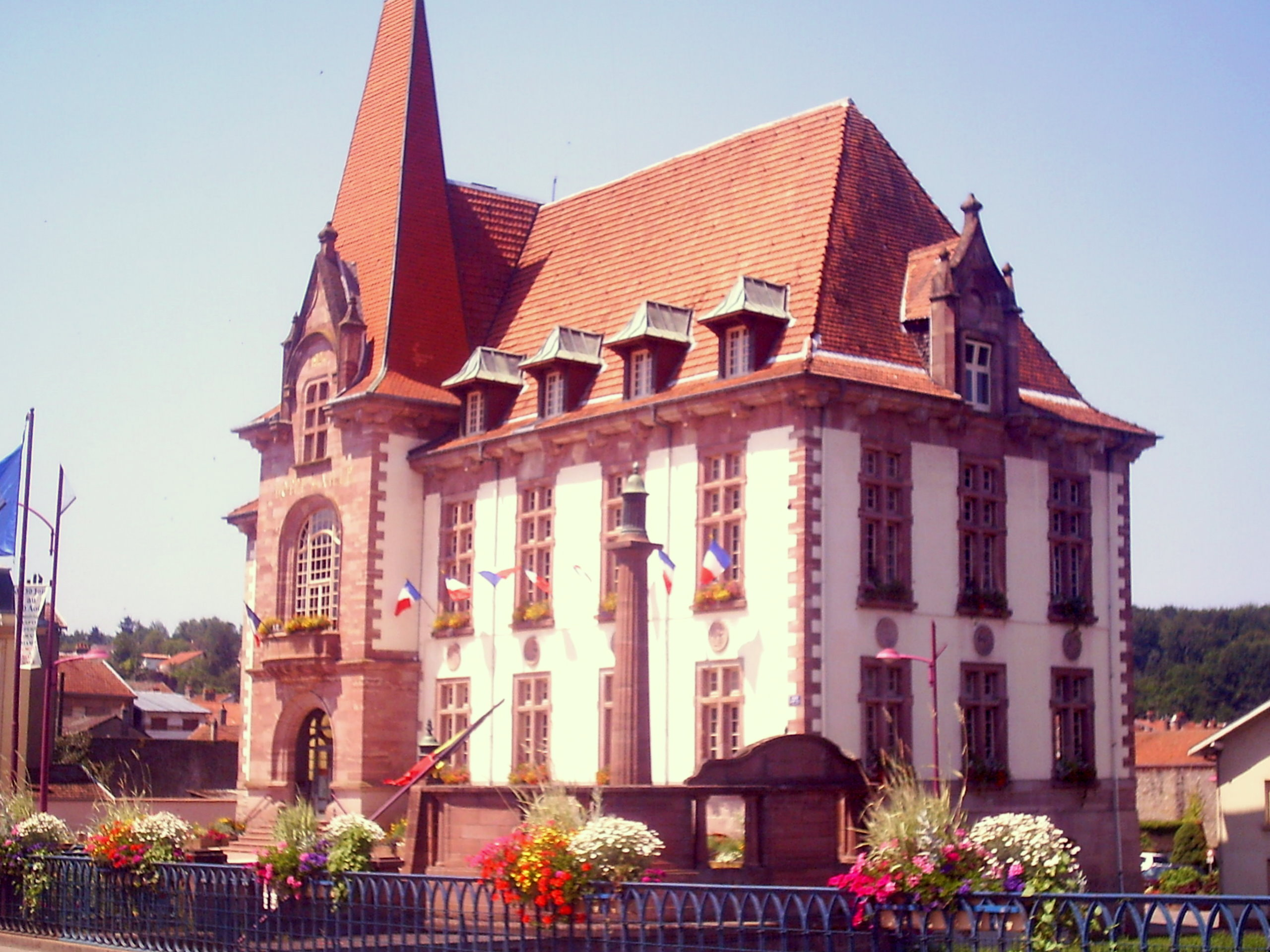
The Town Hall

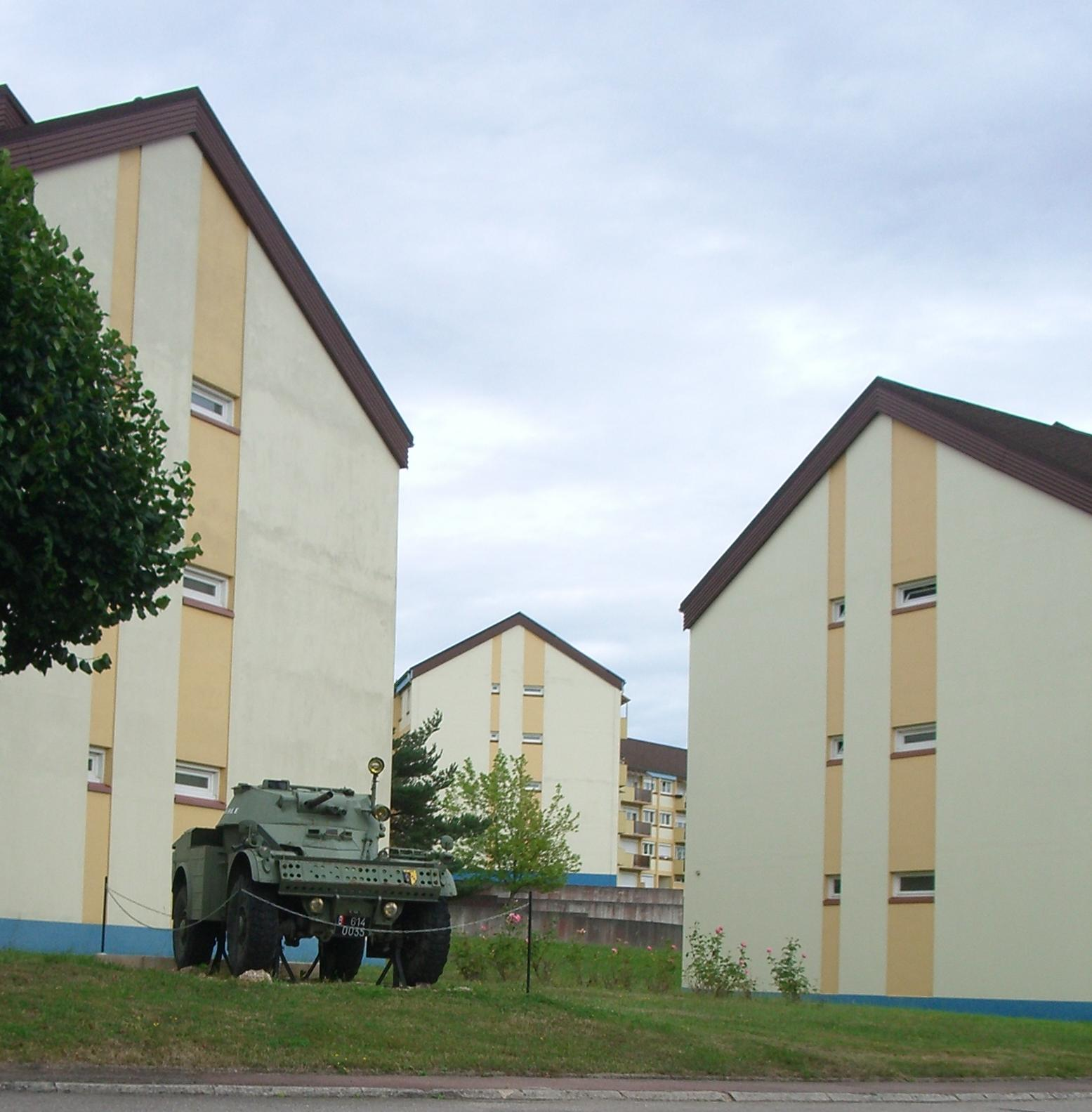
The Escadron de Gendarmerie Mobile at Baccarat

The Canton of Baccarat includes 20 communes: Azerailles, Baccarat proper, Bertrichamps, Brouville, Deneuvre, Flin, Fontenoy-la-Joûte, Gélacourt, Glonville, Hablainville, Lachapelle, Merviller, Mignéville, Montigny, Pettonville, Reherrey, Thiaville-sur-Meurthe, Vacqueville, Vaxainville, and Veney.

The Community of communes of Cristal was created on 1 January 2004 to link Baccarat with the neighbouring communes of Lachapelle and Thiaville-sur-Meurthe.

In 2010 Baccarat was awarded the Certification mark of "Ville Internet @@" (Internet Town).

List of Successive Mayors

From	To	Name	Party	Position
	1857	Jean Joseph Grégoire		
1914	1914	Arthur Marie Joseph Tisserand		
1965	1971	Jean-Marie Fève		Doctor, born in Vicherey
1971	1975	André Violle		
1975	1983	Georges Humbert		
1983	1989	Michel Bacus		
1989	2001	Jean-Marie Fève		
2001	2008	Michel le Paige	PS	
2008	2014	Josette Renaux		Retired French Consul
2014	2026	Christian Gex	PS	Engineer

=== Twinning ===
Baccarat has twinning associations with:

- Gernsbach (Germany) since 1962.

== Population ==
The inhabitants of the commune are known as Bachâmois or Bachâmoises in French.

Historical population

Year	Pop.	±% p.a.
1793	983	—
1800	1,096	+1.57%
1806	1,246	+2.16%
1821	1,857	+2.70%
1831	2,304	+2.18%
1836	3,057	+5.82%
1841	3,216	+1.02%
1846	3,260	+0.27%
1851	3,520	+1.55%
1856	3,565	+0.25%
1861	4,121	+2.94%
1872	5,036	+1.84%
1876	5,764	+3.43%
1881	6,013	+0.85%
1886	5,823	−0.64%
1891	5,723	−0.35%
1896	6,772	+3.42%
1901	7,014	+0.70%

Year	Pop.	±% p.a.
1906	6,996	−0.05%
1911	7,277	+0.79%
1921	5,739	−2.35%
1926	5,605	−0.47%
1931	5,598	−0.02%
1936	5,336	−0.95%
1946	5,034	−0.58%
1954	6,024	+2.27%
1962	6,067	+0.09%
1968	5,856	−0.59%
1975	5,590	−0.66%
1982	5,433	−0.41%
1990	5,022	−0.98%
1999	4,746	−0.63%
2007	4,663	−0.22%
2012	4,512	−0.66%
2017	4,330	−0.82%
2023	4,089	−0.95%

Source: EHESS and INSEE

== Economy ==
The town's celebrated glassworks and crystal factory, also known as Baccarat, has operated since 1765. Its technique was established by Aimé Gabriel d'Artigues. Many of its workers under Mr. Roland-Gosselin in the 1950s were awarded the title of Meilleur Ouvrier de France.

Around the time of the Franco-Prussian War, the town was also noted for its large export trade of timber, wheels, planks, and charcoal.

== Culture and heritage ==
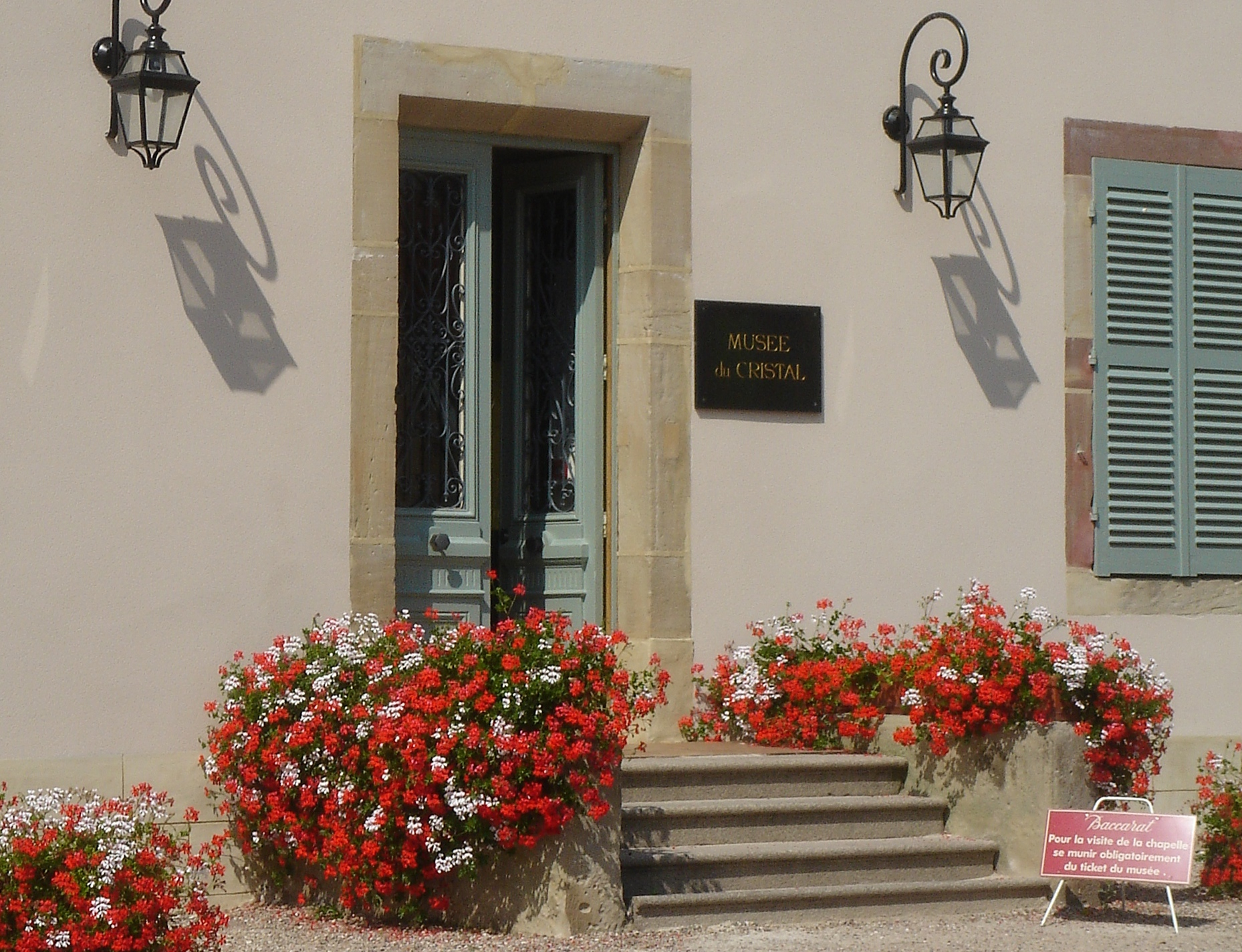
The Baccarat Museum

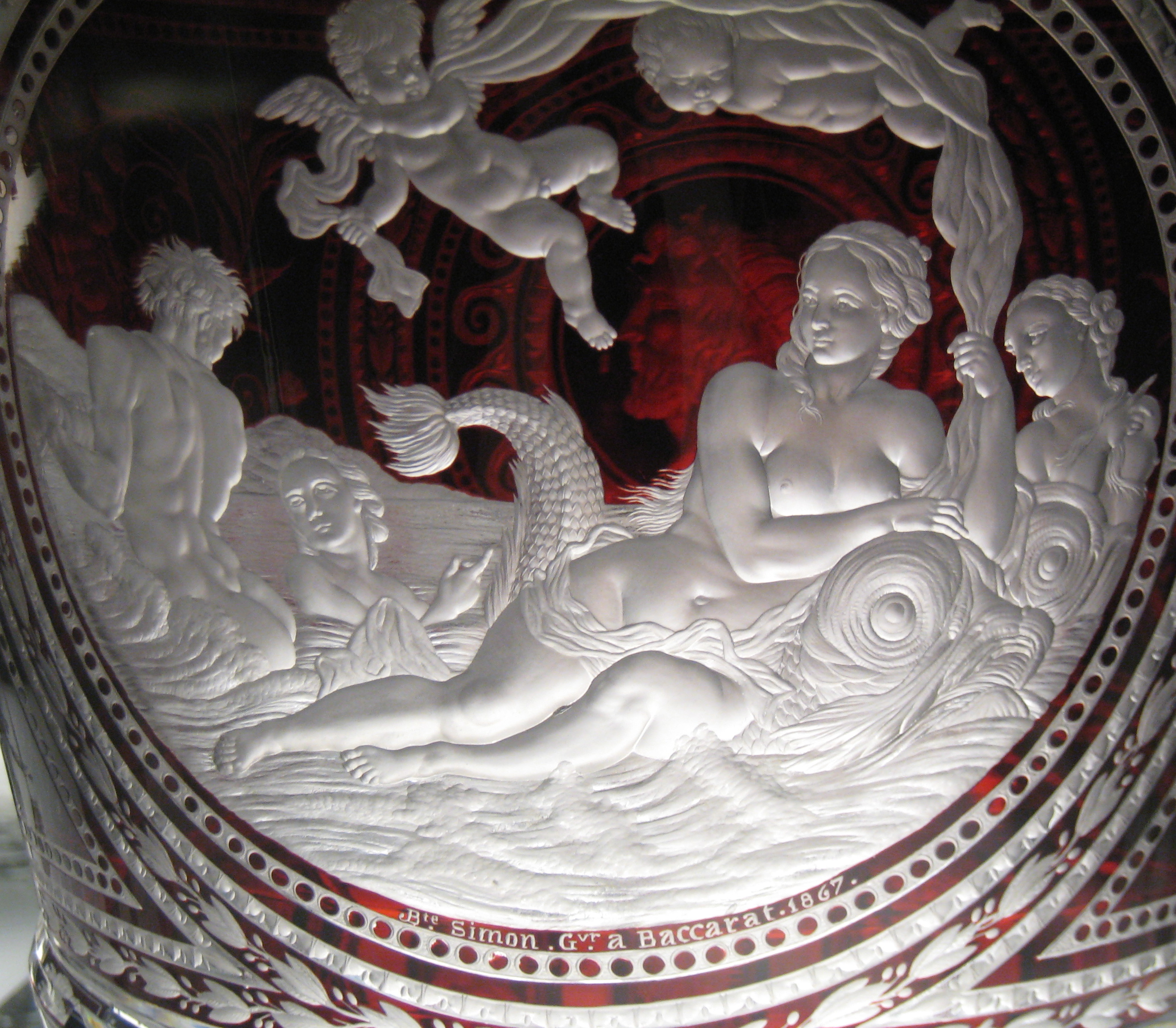
A Crystal object in the Baccarat Museum, Paris

=== Civil heritage ===
The commune has many sites that are registered as historical monuments:

- The Berthelon Gasworks at 28 Rue du 20e Bataillon (1909) The Gasworks contains a Gas Meter (19th century) which is registered as an historical object.
- The Société des Constructions Métalliques de Baccarat (Metalwork Factory) at 30 Rue du 20e Bataillon (1913)
- The Hydro-electric Power Plant at Rue des Cristalleries (1927)
- The Gasworks at 49 Rue des Cristalleries (1851)
- The Chateau de la Cristallerie (now Museum) at 6 Rue des Cristalleries (1764) was enlarged for Aimé d'Artigues (1778–1848), the recipient of the glassworks in 1816 by the addition of two lateral bodies in 1817. It was used as housing for the administrators of the crystal works from the middle the 19th century. Part of the ground floor has now been converted into a museum of Baccarat crystal products. The park was bisected by an open street in the 1st half of the 19th century and a part (located to the west of the orangery) was subdivided in the last years of the 19th century for the construction of the Workers' City. There are also some private archives.
- The Saint Anne Glassworks (now Cristallerie de Baccarat) at 6-49 Rue des Cristalleries (1764–1954) The Glassworks contains a Stained glass panel depicting Glass workers (1992) which is registered as an historical object.
- A Sawmill at 4a Rue de Humbépaire (19th century)
- The Drouard et Berthault Lock and Metalwork Factory (now Société des Constructions Métalliques de Baccarat) at 10 Avenue de Lachapelle (1873)
- The former Dairy Factory (now an Auto workshop) on Route de Merviller (1930)
- The former Deneuvre Mill (now a Crystal Lapidary and Engraving Factory) on Rue du Moulin de Deneuvre (1836)
- The Workers' City (1764–1892)

An exhibition of Baccarat Glass at Petit Palais à Paris, November 2014

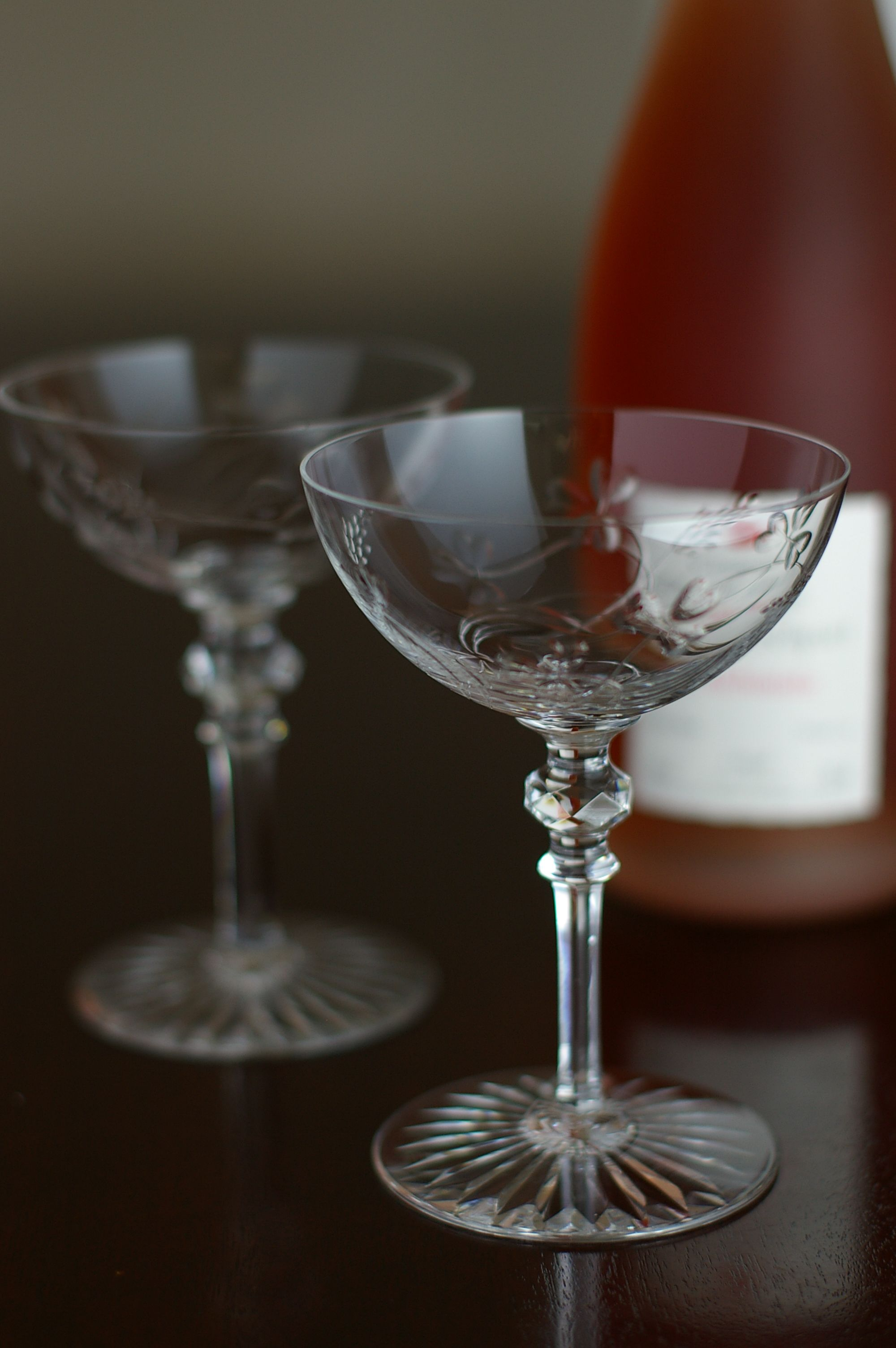
Champagne Glass 1890

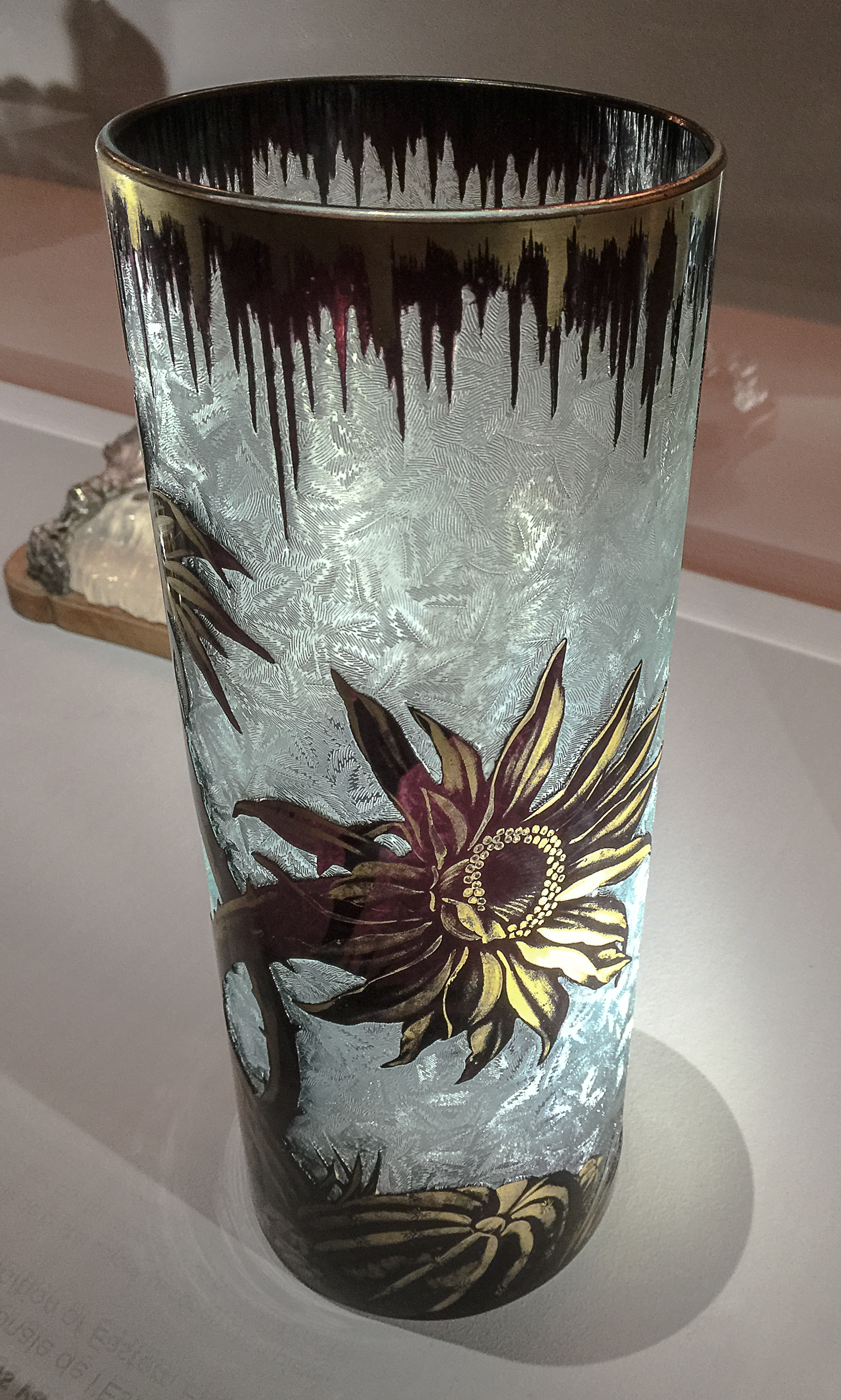

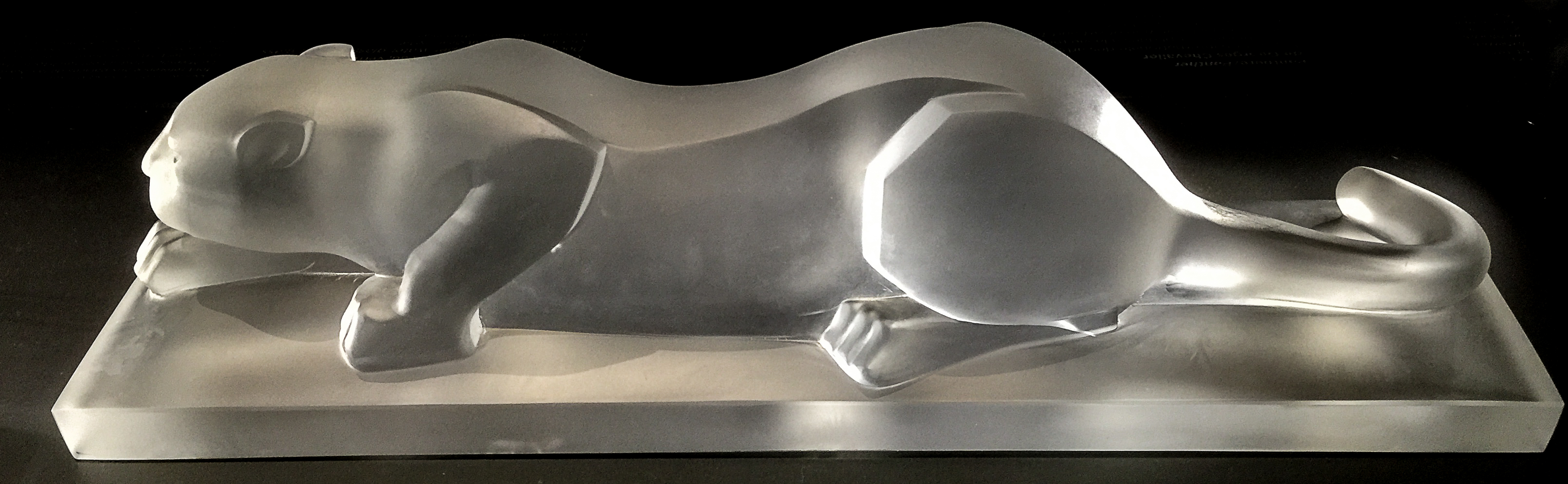

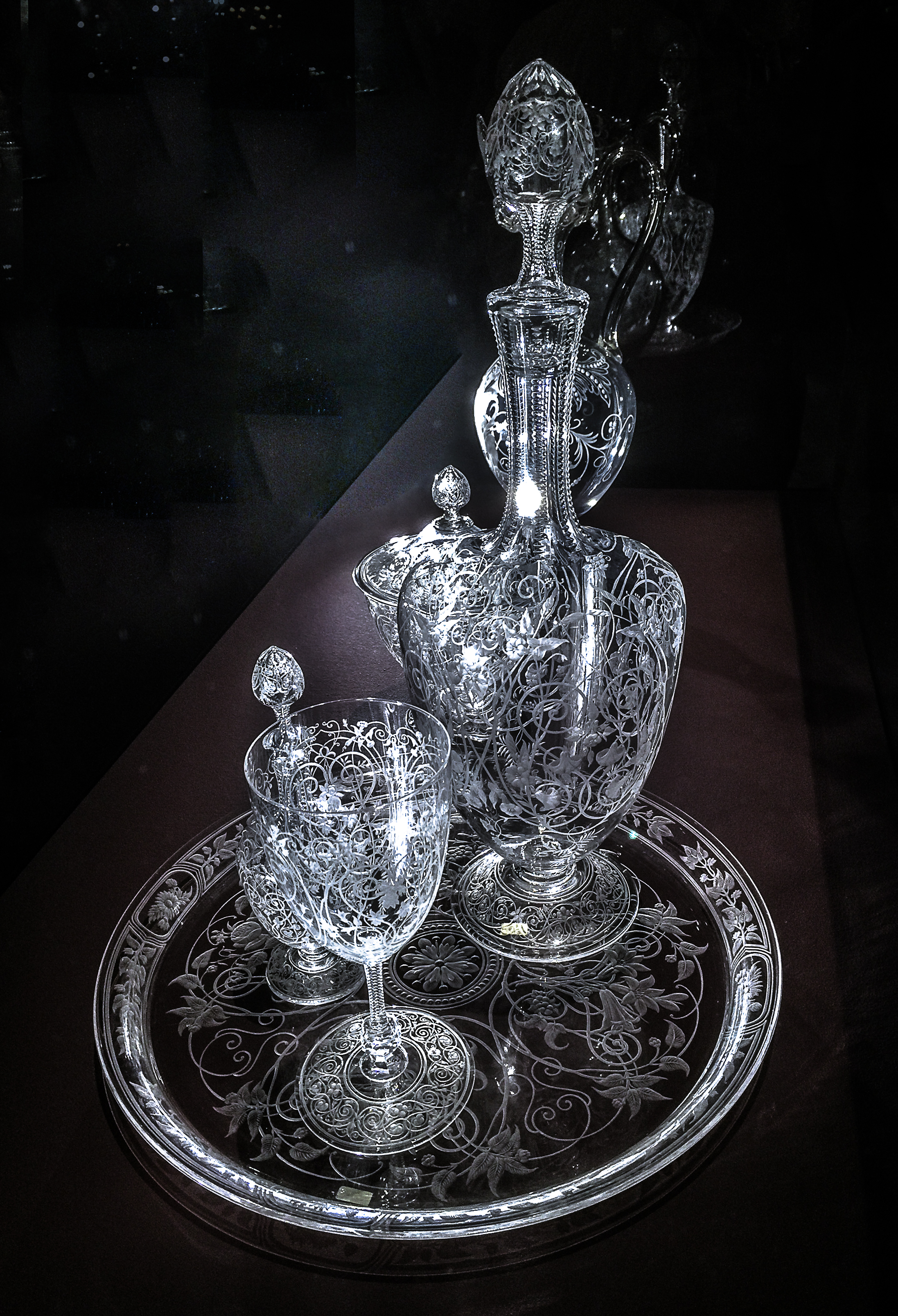

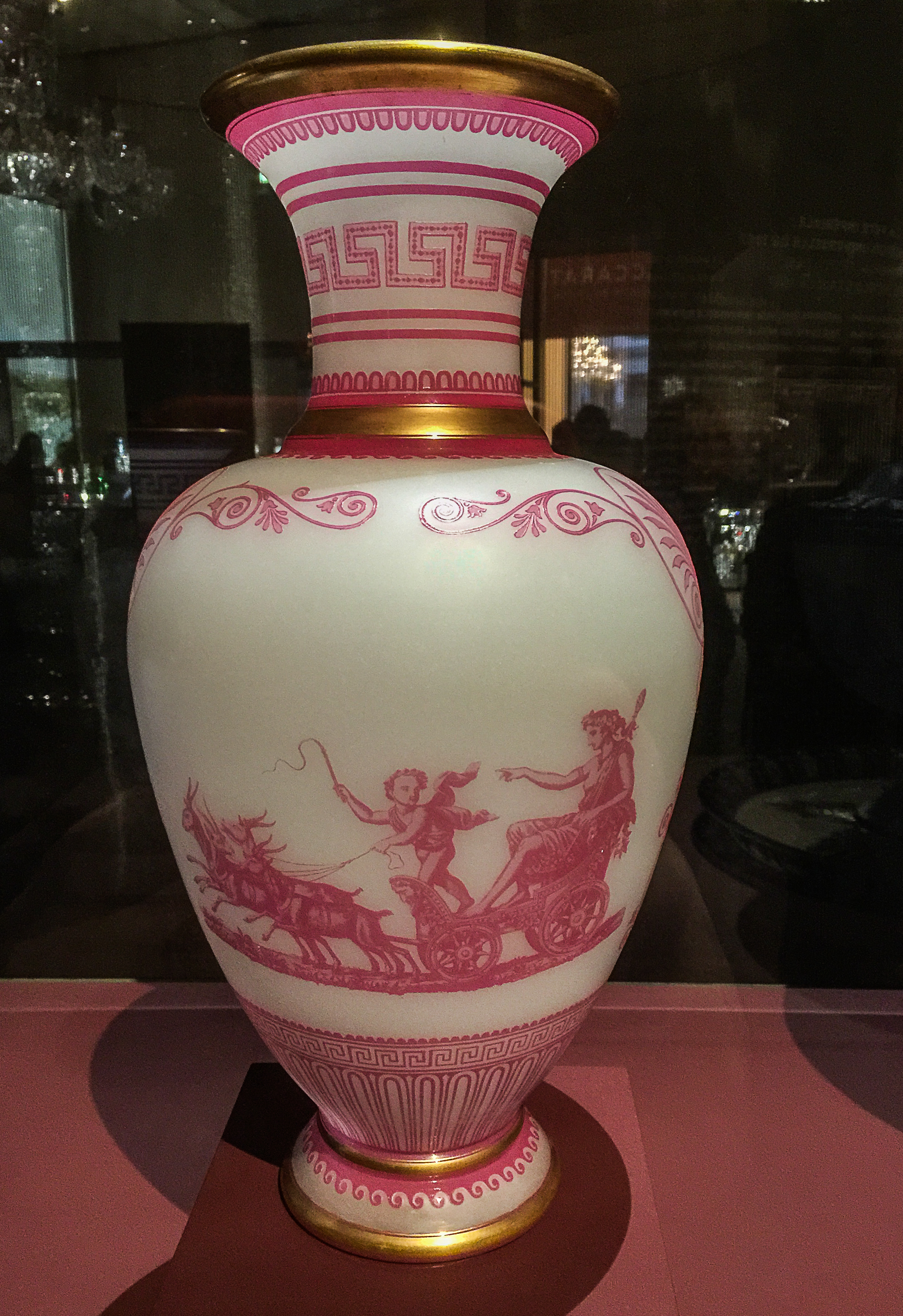

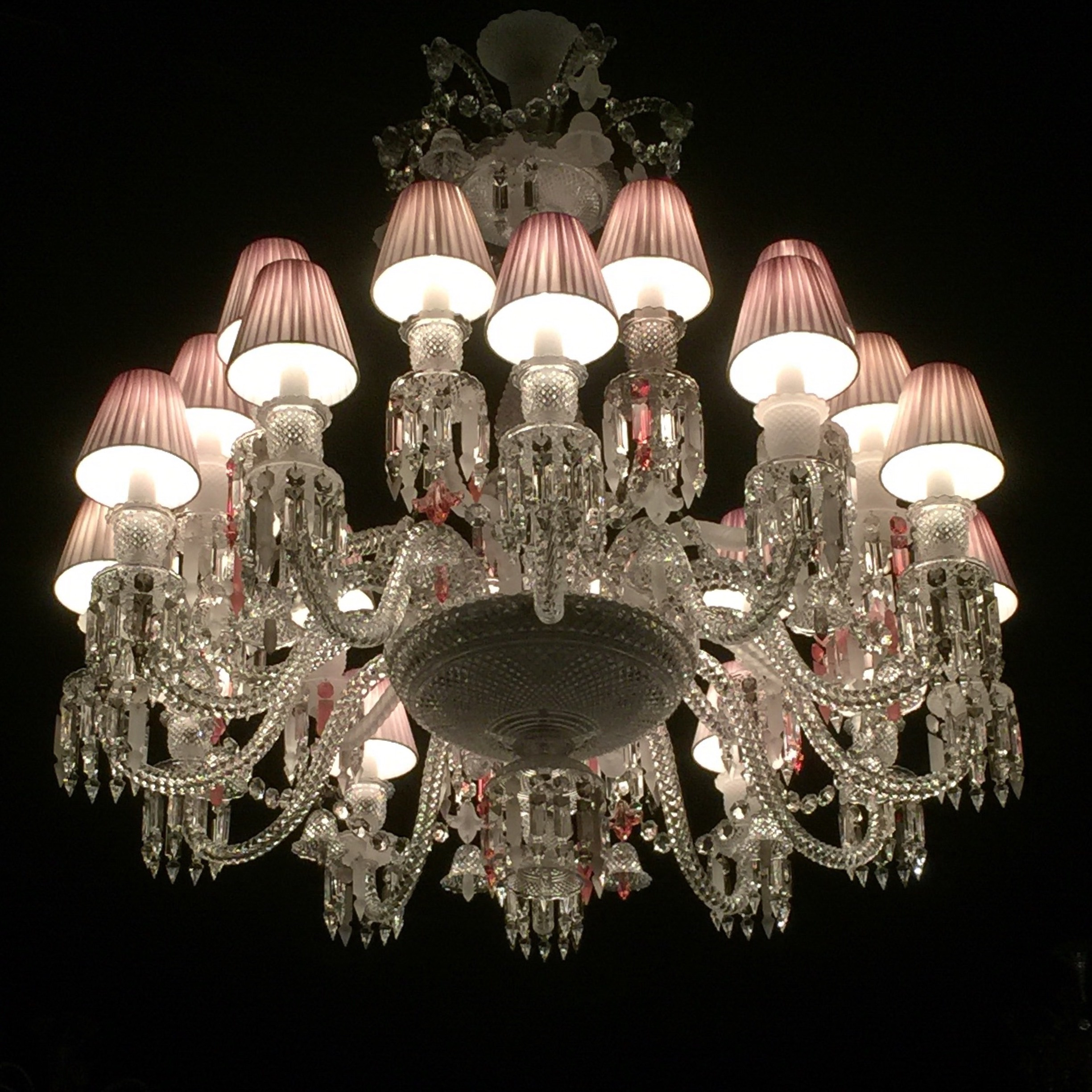

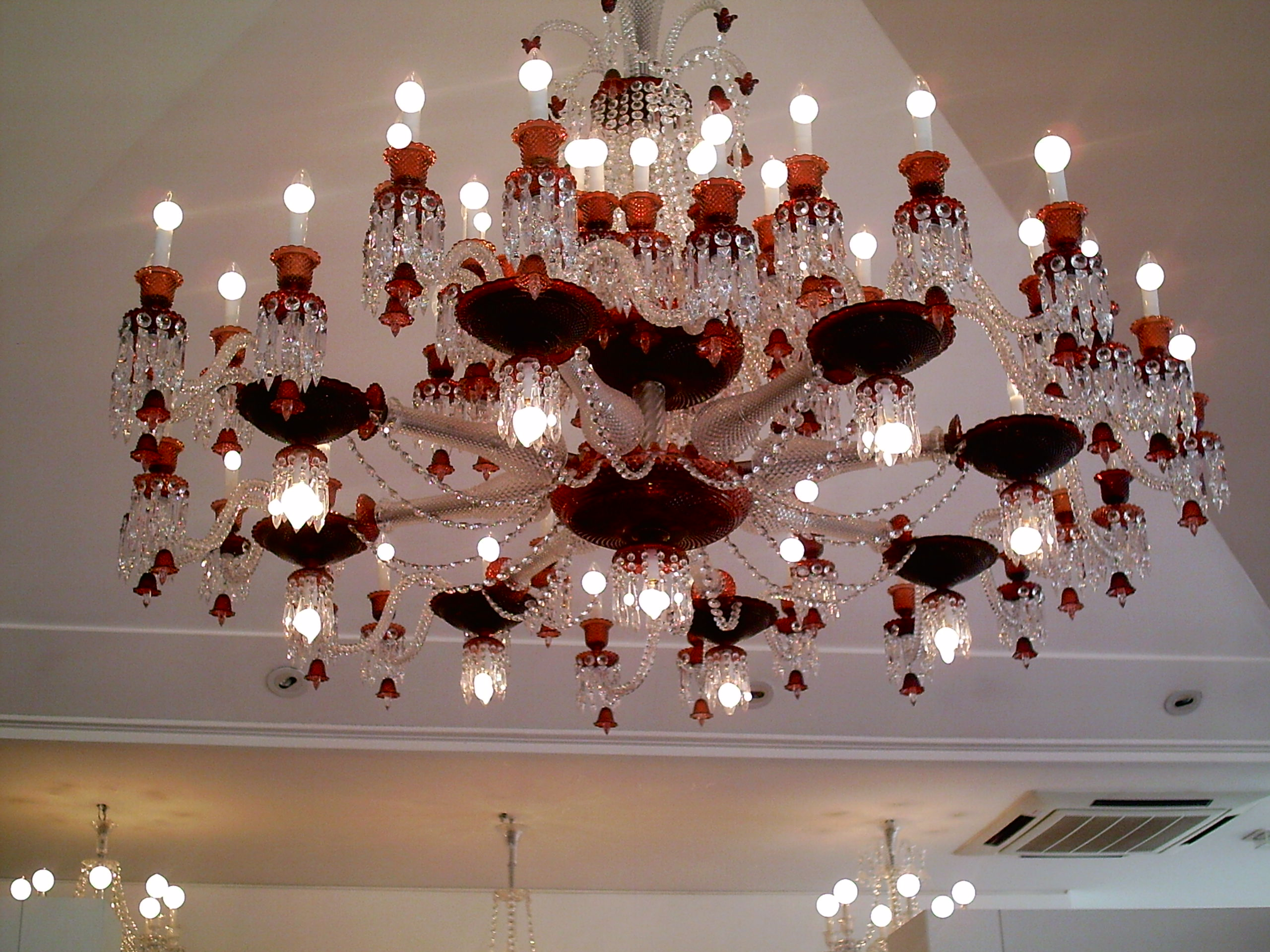

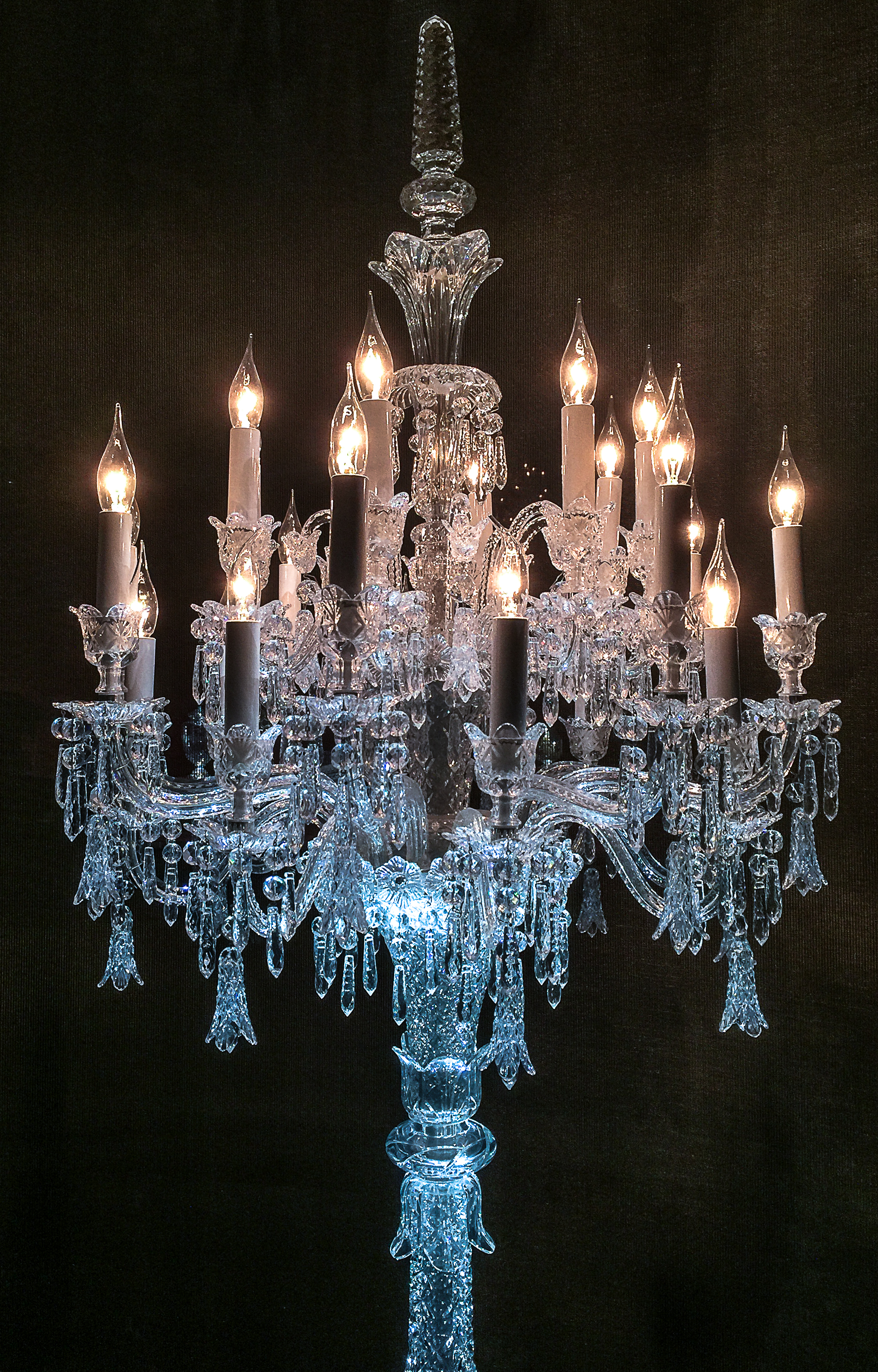

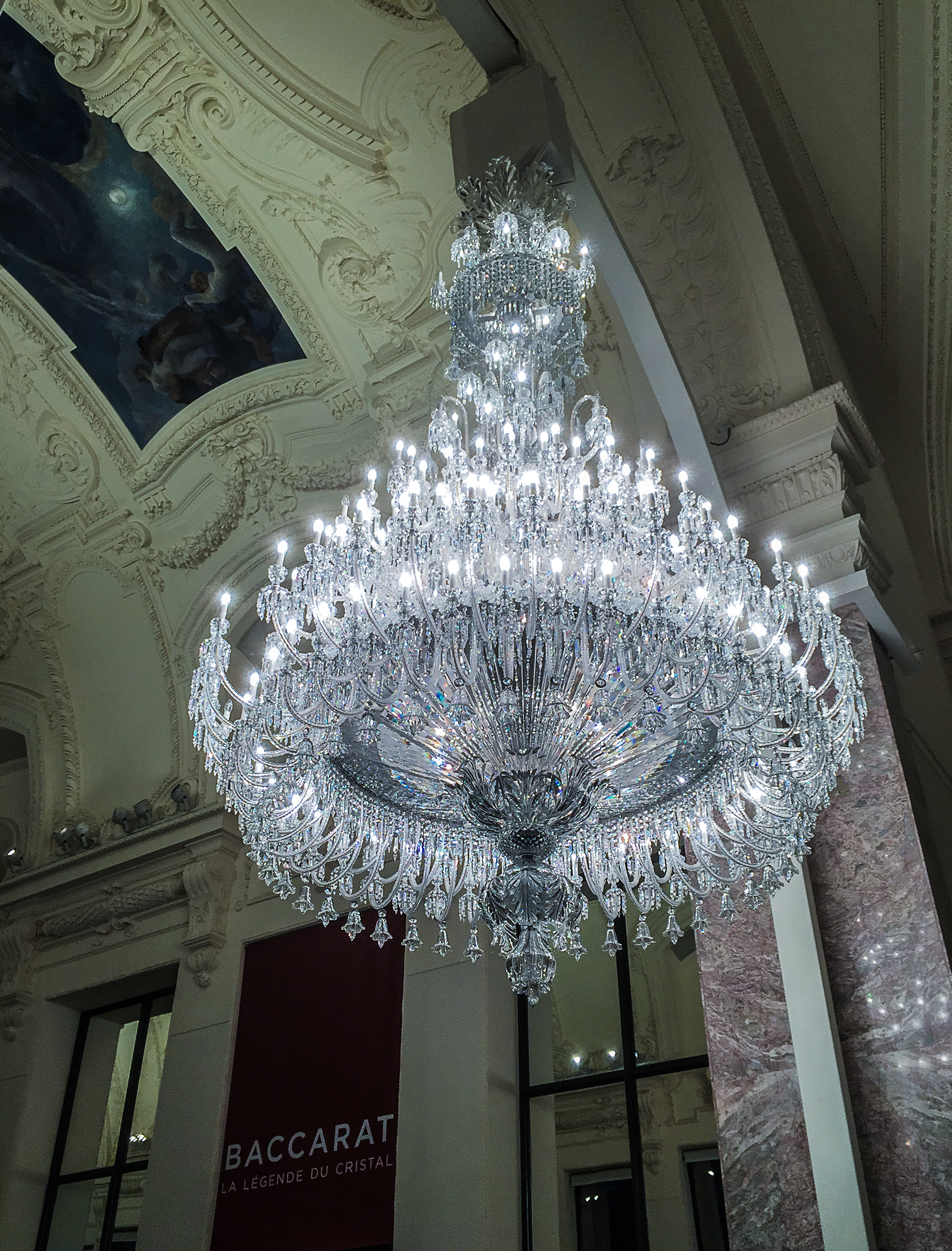

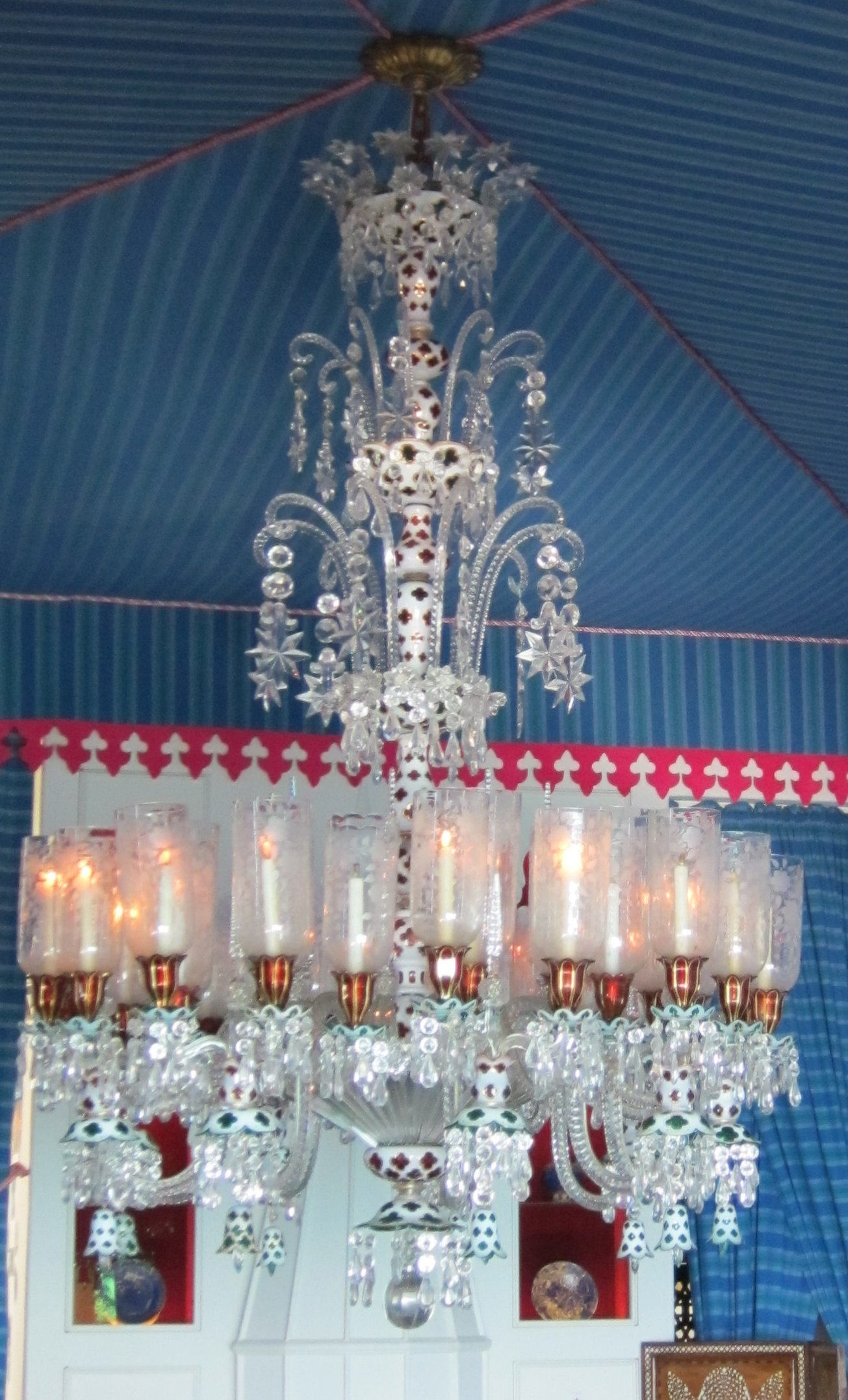
A Baccarat Chandelier (1840) made for India

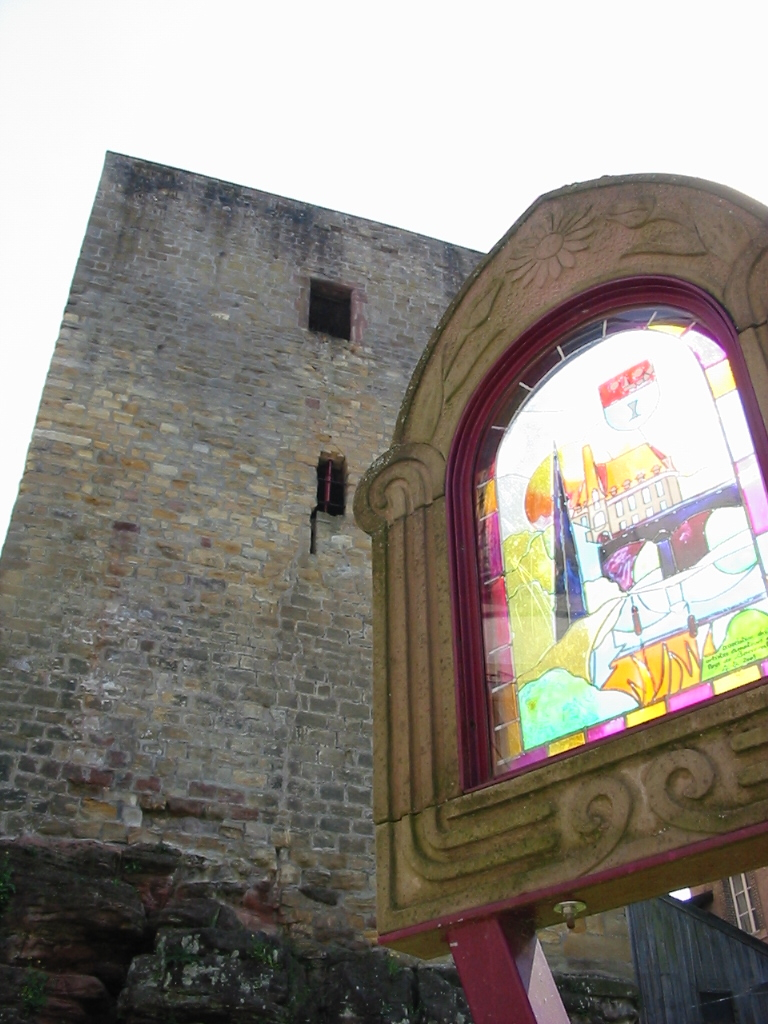
The Tower of Voués

Other sites of interest

- The Tower of Voués was the keep of the castle built in 1305 by Count Henry I to protect the serfs' houses. It measures 11.70 m in the North by 14.70 m in the East and its height is approximately 30 m. It was sold in 1332 by Henry III to Adhémar de Monteil (Bishop of Metz) who built a castle around which Baccarat would be built. The castle was demolished in the middle of the 17th century by Charles IV, Duke of Lorraine.
- The Town Hall in neo-Renaissance style was built in 1924 by architect Deville, inspired by Flemish houses. On the facade carved buttons represent the different skills of the crystal industry. The grand staircase is the work of Jean Prouvé. The entire building was completely renovated in 2004. The Town Hall contains many items that are registered as historical objects:
  - Framed Drawings (1947)
  - Framed Paintings (19th-20th century)
  - 4 Chandeliers and 6 Sconces of Baccarat crystal (1925)
- The Haxo Building contains a Painting of a Forest Landscape which is registered as an historical object.
- The Community Hall contains two items that are registered as historical objects:
  - 2 Chandeliers and 2 Sconces (1925)
  - 2 Paintings: A Boar taken by a team of Mastiffs and The double blow (1886)
- The Baccarat Museum at 2 Rue des Cristalleries
- An Arboretum and rose garden (Michaut Park - 7 hectares) behind the Hotel de Ville.
- The Crystal fountain roundabout between the Town Hall and St Rémy de Baccarat
- Fables de La Fontaine, made of stained glass windows in pink sandstone frames, are installed in different areas in the city.
- The Pôle Bijou

=== Religious heritage ===
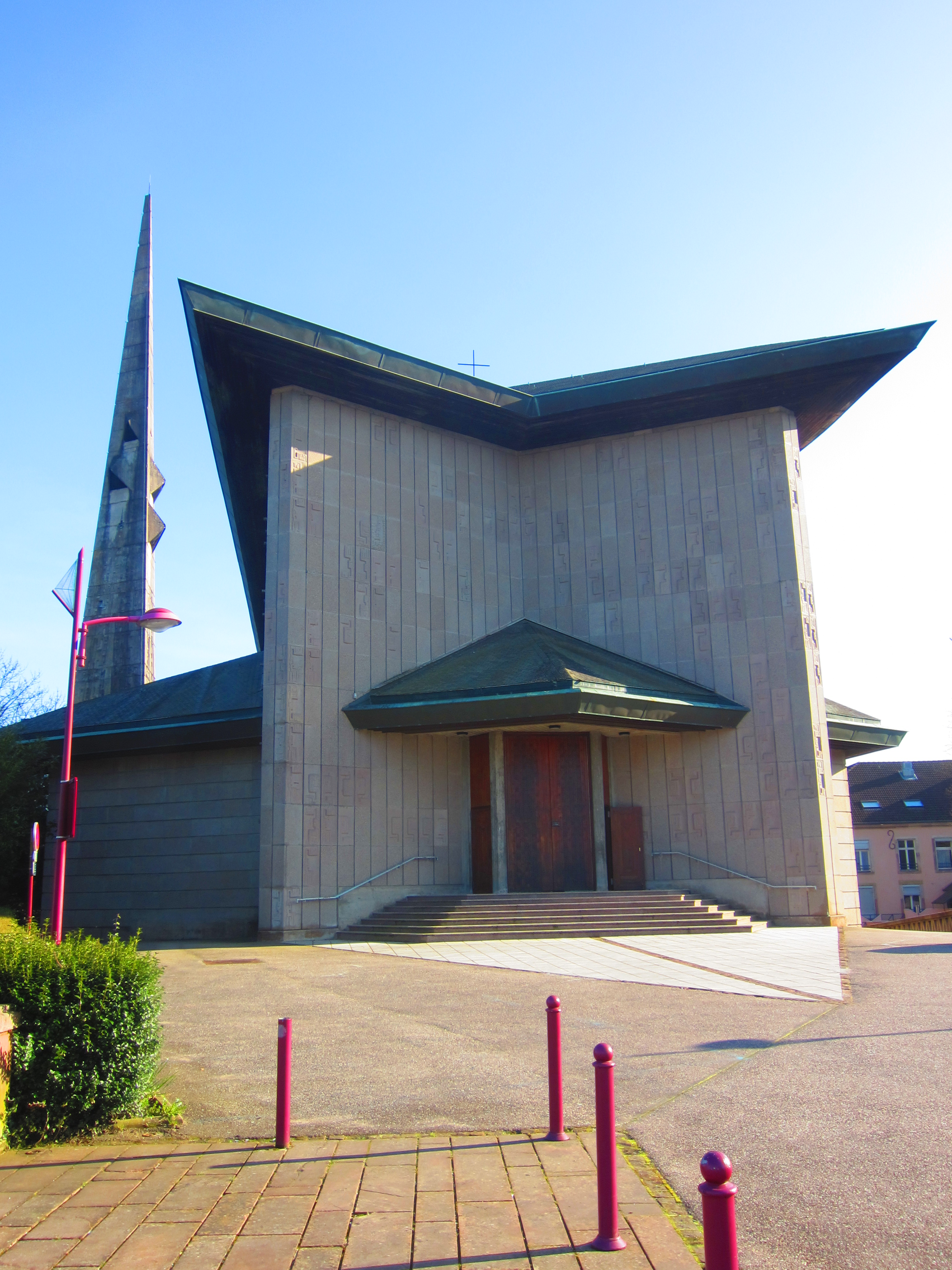
The Church of Saint-Rémy

The commune has several religious buildings and structures that are registered as historical monuments:

- The Chapel of Saint Anne at 6 Rue des Cristalleries (1775) was intended for the use of glassworks staff. It was built as a church annexe for the Deneuvre parish in 1802 and currently it is used for summer exhibitions organized by the Baccarat factory.
- The Church of Saint-Rémy at Au Patis (1954) was destroyed in 1944 and rebuilt in modern style. Built by the architect Nicolas Kazis, it is entirely built using the sign of the triangle - the symbol of the Holy Trinity. The bell tower of trihedral shape measures 55 metres in height and houses 3 bells. On each side of the choir two symmetrical groups represent the twelve Apostles, recognizable by their traditional attributes. Beautiful wrought iron furniture completes the church: two stoups with basins in baccarat, a chandelier, 2 separation grills in the transept, the Ambon, the Tabernacle with its and crystal panels, and a baptistery at the foot of the cross with a wooden Christ. There are two other statues in the lateral naves: Saint Remy and a Virgin and Child (Our Lady of the Offering) by François Brochet. The side aisles have sculptures of reconstituted stone and Baccarat crystal representing the 14 Stations of the Cross. A wonderful ceiling (the most beautiful of its kind in Europe) is composed of 130 laminated timber elements which weigh 19 tons. At the entrance of the church a pipe organ by Jacquot Lavergne was installed in the gallery in 1958 with 3 keyboards and pedals and 40 registers. The organ has 3,660 pipes. The church contains two items that are registered as historical objects:
  - A Ciborium (No. 3) (19th century)
  - 48 Stained glass windows: The Apostles and Calvary (1957) The panels are composed of 4,000 glass tiles 2.5 cm thick cut into 20,000 small pieces of Baccarat crystal fitted in concrete. The colourful set uses over 150 colours which makes it unique in the world.

Other religious sites of interest

- The Chapel of Saint Christopher (12th century) has some statues.
- The Chapel of Saint Catherine (17th century)
- Chapel of Our Lady of Deliverance (19th century)
- Chapel of Our Lady of Humbépaire (1948) is illuminated by 20 stained glass panels by Gabriel Loire, a carillon of 6 Paccard bells is installed in the belfry.
- Remains of the Carmelite Convent (15th century)
- The Church of Saint Joseph of Badmenil was restored in 2012.
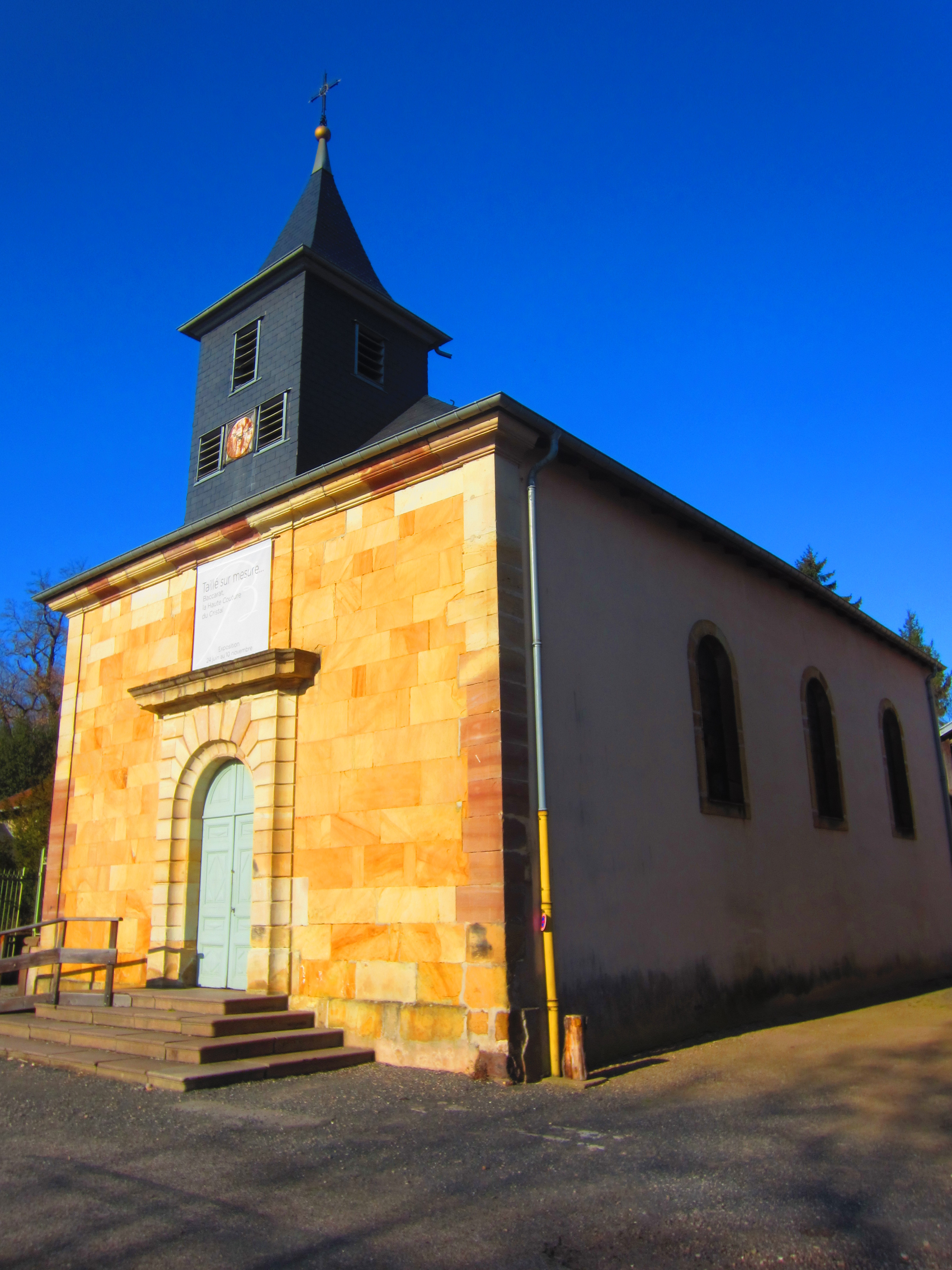
Chapel of Saint Anne

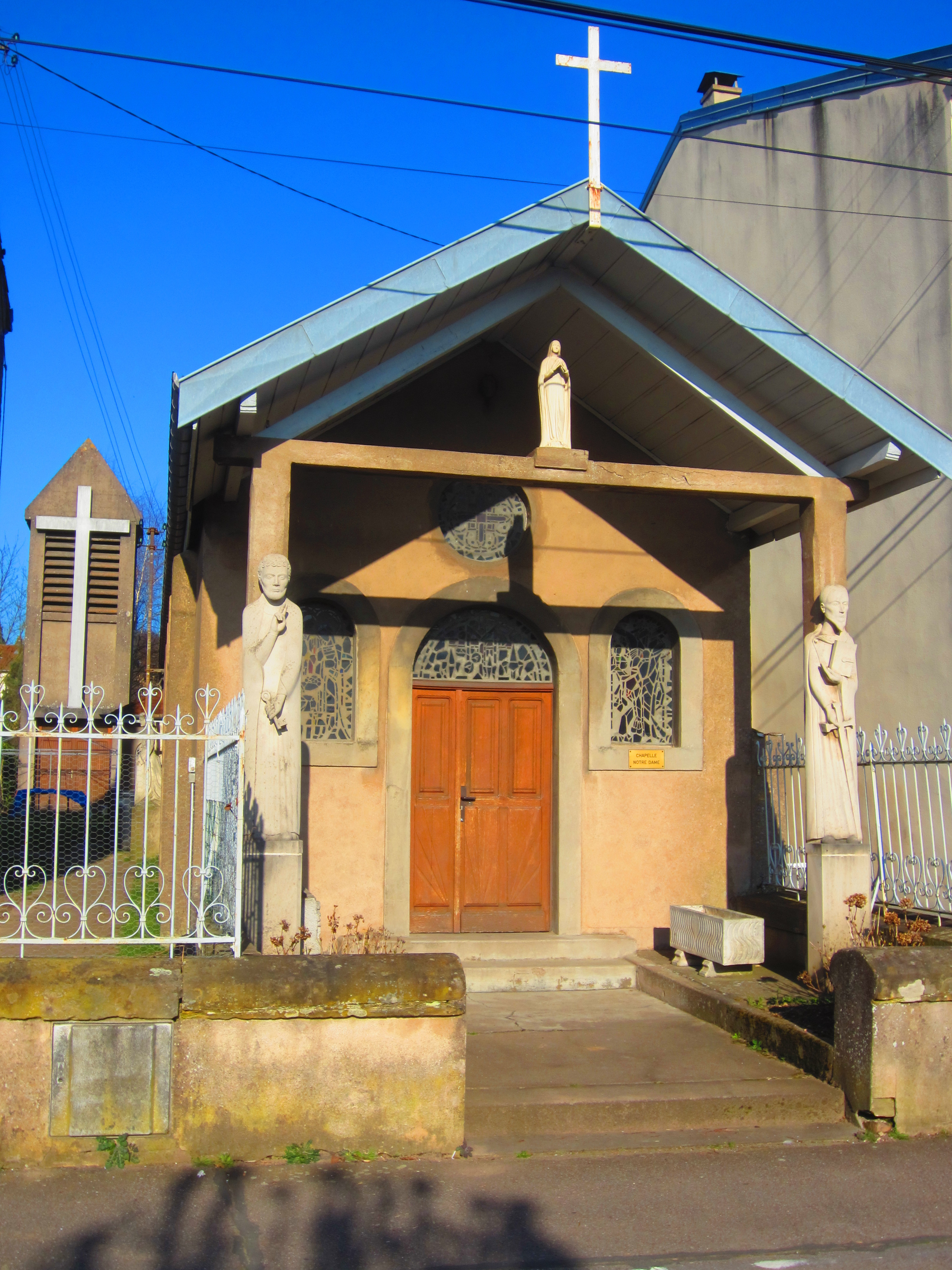
Chapel of Our Lady of Humbépaire

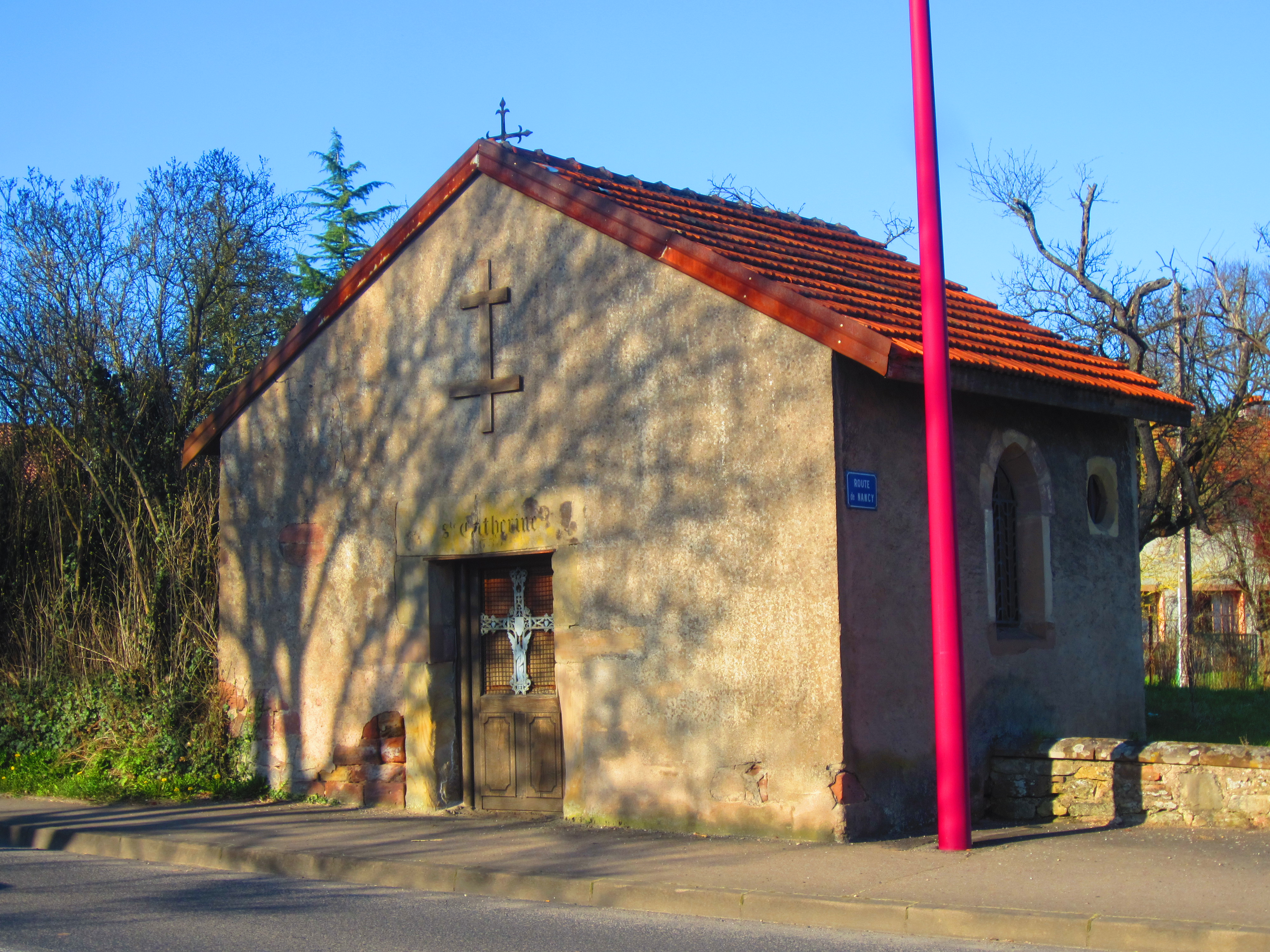
Chapel of Saint Catherine

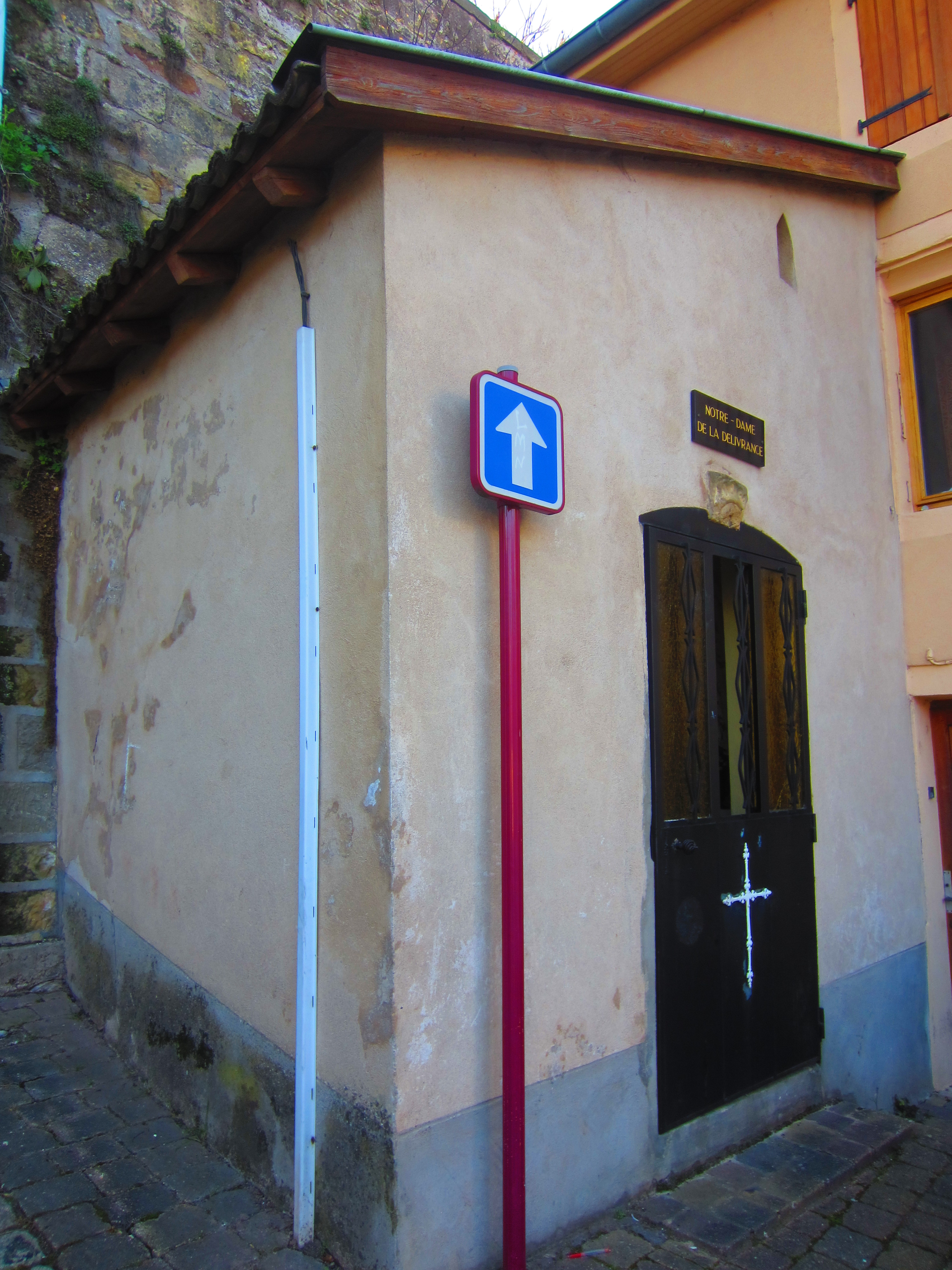
Chapel of Our Lady of Deliverance

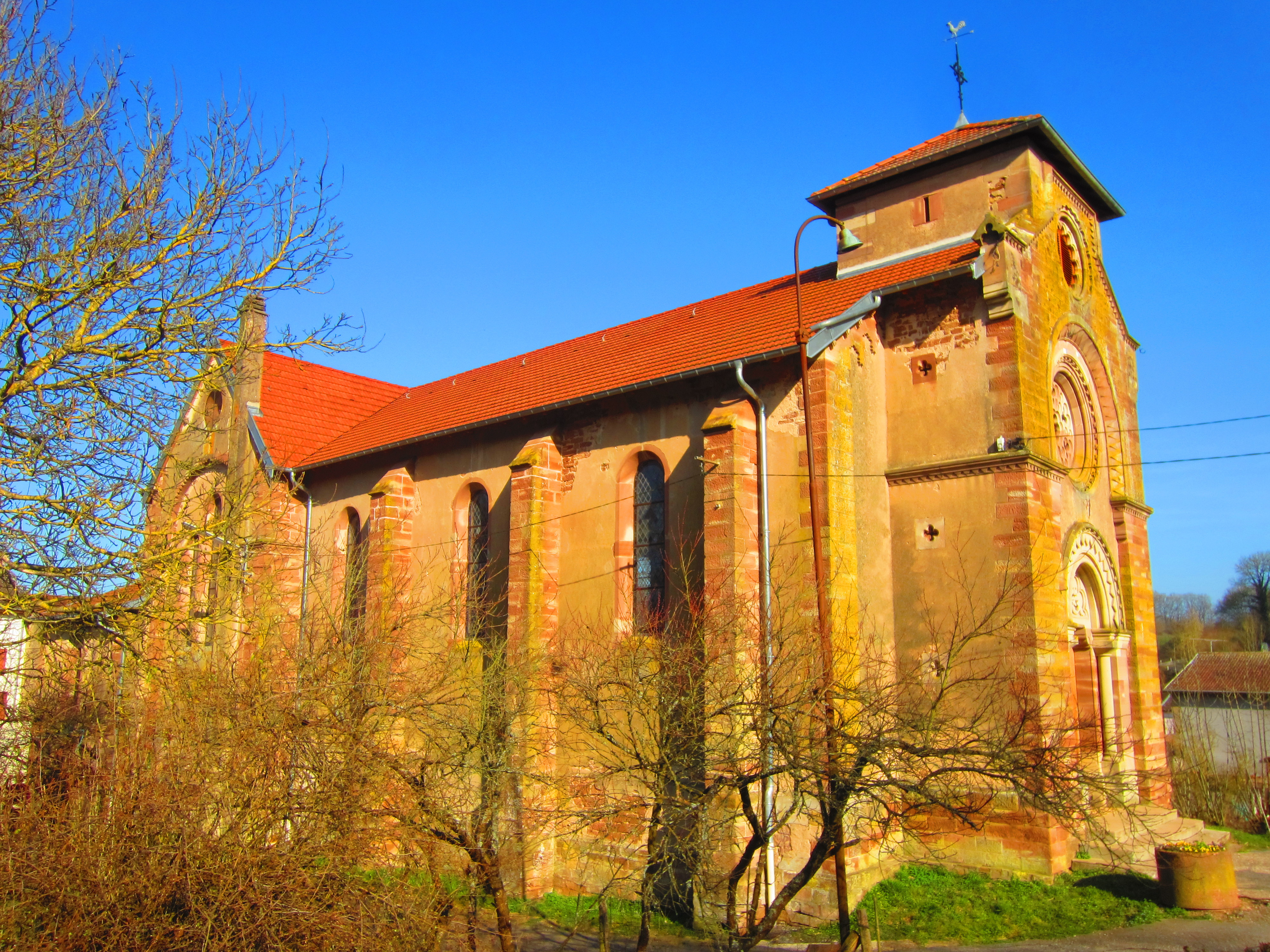
Church of Saint-Joseph of Badmenil

=== Military Life ===
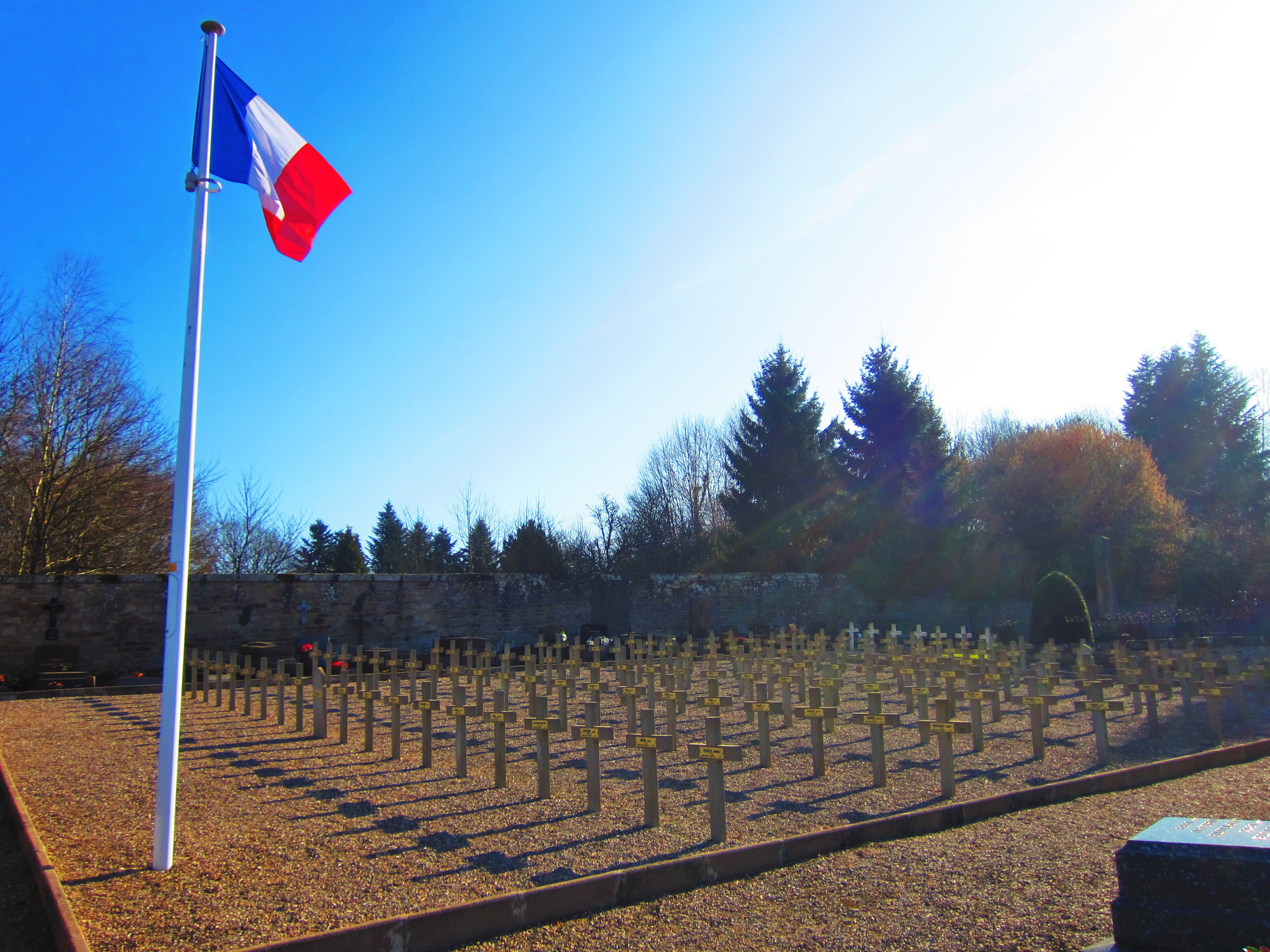
Baccarat Military Cemetery

The 20th Battalion of Foot Chasseurs were stationed in Baccarat from 1906 to 1918.

=== Festivals ===
- The Fête du pâté lorrain (Festival of Lorraine pâté) is held on the second Sunday of September
- The Grand Carnival is held in March every second year
- Les Insolites (The Unusuals) is a discovery trail of contemporary works in Michaut Park from mid-June to the end of August
- The Festival International des Métiers d'art (International Festival of Crafts) (FIMA) is held every second year

== Notable people linked to the commune ==
- Louis Ancel (1736–1802), General of the Army of the Republic, died in Baccarat.
- François Gény (1861–1959), lawyer, born in Baccarat.
- Jean-Michel Bertrand (1943–2008), politician, MP for Ain, born in Baccarat.
- Édouard Ignace (1862–1924), former MP for Seine and Under-secretary of State for Military Justice.
- Maurice Jaubert, composer born in 1900, wounded in action and died in Baccarat on 19 June 1940.
- Charles Peccatte (1870–1962), painter
- Michel-Auguste Colle (1872–1949), painter
- André Thirion (1907–2001), leftist activist and surrealist writer

== See also ==
- Communes of the Meurthe-et-Moselle department
