= Glonville =

- Commune
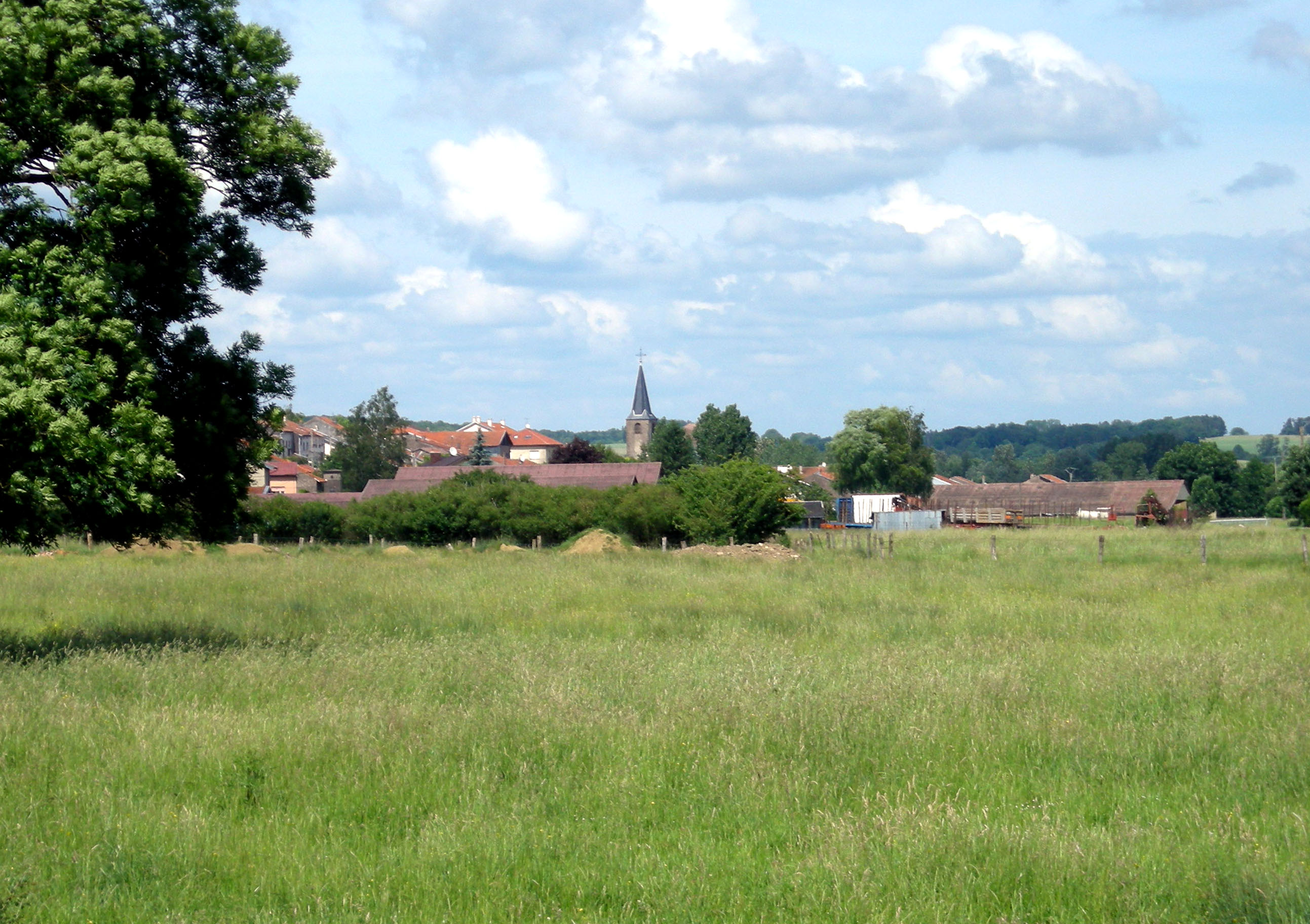
- A general view of Glonville, seen from Fontenoy-la-Joûte

- Coat of arms
- Location of Glonville
- Location within France Location within Grand Est
- Coordinates: 48°28′29″N 6°41′28″E
- Country: France
- Region: Grand Est
- Department: Meurthe-et-Moselle
- Arrondissement: Lunéville
- Canton: Baccarat
- Intercommunality: Territoire de Lunéville à Baccarat

Government
  - Mayor (2020–2026): Marie-Lucie Henry
- Area^{1}: 18.58 km^{2} (7.17 sq mi)
- Highest elevation: 353 m (1,158 ft)
- Lowest elevation: 251 m (823 ft)
- Population (2023): 385
  - Density: 20.7/km^{2} (53.7/sq mi)
- Time zone: UTC+01:00 (CET)
  - Summer (DST): UTC+02:00 (CEST)
- INSEE/Postal code: 54229 /54122
- ^{1} French Land Register data, which excludes lakes, ponds, glaciers > 1 km^{2} (0.386 sq mi or 247 acres) and river estuaries.

Glonville (French pronunciation: [ɡlɔ̃vil]) is a commune in the Meurthe-et-Moselle department in north-eastern France.

== See also ==
- Communes of the Meurthe-et-Moselle department
