= Pâté lorrain =

French meat pastry

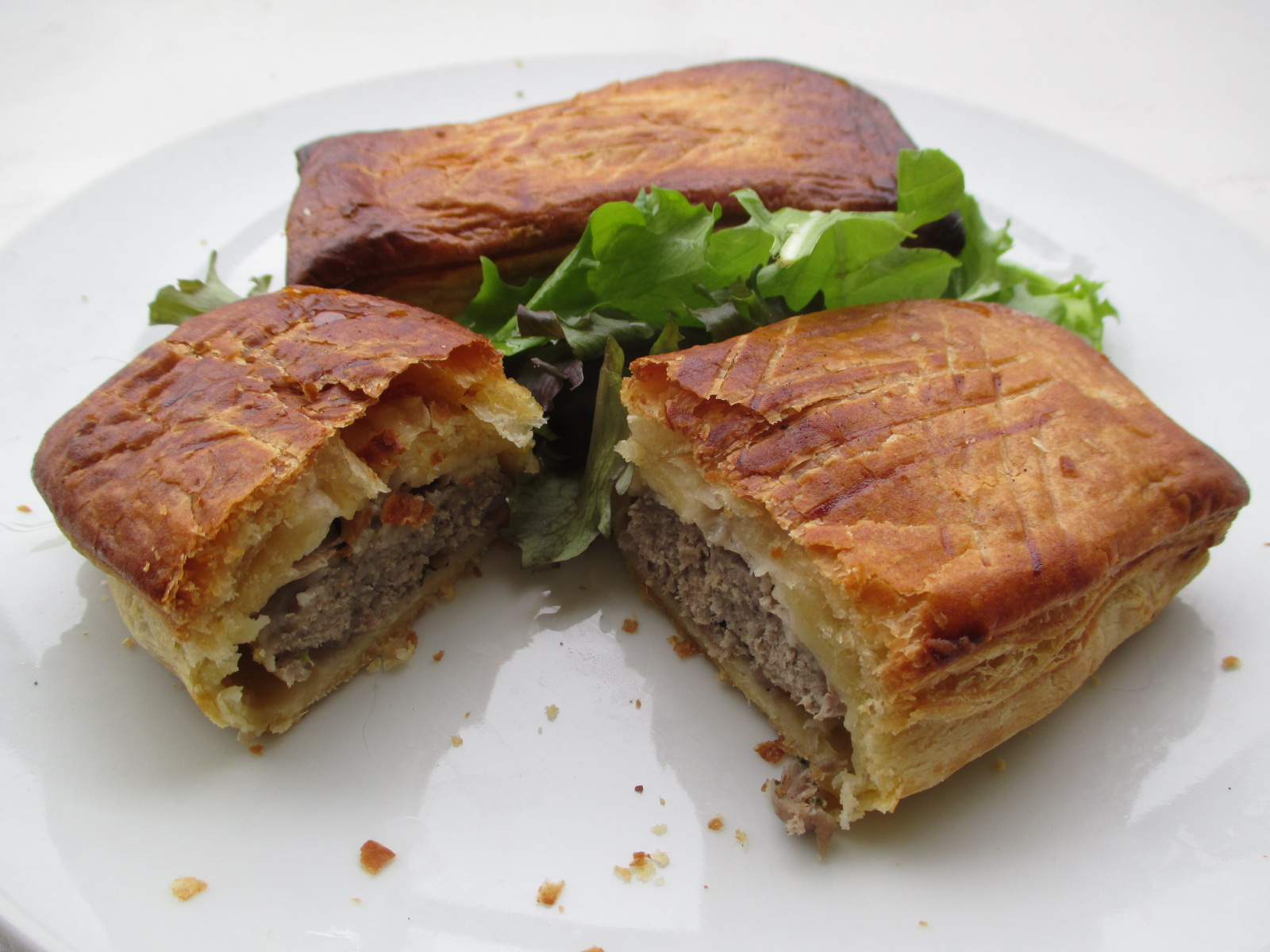
- Place of origin: France
- Region or state: Lorraine
- Main ingredients: Diced meat in pastry

Pâté lorrain is a savoury dish from Lorraine in north-east France. It now usually consists of a meat terrine or pâté covered in pastry, usually puff, occasionally shortcrust, but was formerly made without a pastry case. It may be served warm or cold. The dish is regarded as emblematic of Lorraine, and there is a fraternity devoted to its promotion and protection.

== Content ==
Curnonsky, the twentieth-century food writer dubbed Prince élu des gastronomes, published a recipe for pâté lorrain which called for a mixture of veal, fresh pork and game (according to the season) seasoned with pepper, spices, cloves and nutmeg in layers alternating with a forcemeat made of meat scraps, shallots, onions, parsley and fat bacon, moistened with a glass of white wine and baked for two to three hours. Once cooked, the pâté was covered in goose fat and chilled.

More recent recipes call for the mixture to be wrapped in puff pastry (pâte feuilletée) before being put in the oven, although shortcrust (pâte brisée) is sometimes suggested. Marinating the meat overnight or longer in marc de Champagne, white wine or sometimes red wine in a refrigerator is widely recommended. In most recipes the only vegetables in the minced meat are shallots or onions, but occasionally chopped cooked Brussels sprouts are added. The finished dish may be served warm from the oven or cold.

The dish is regarded as emblematic of Lorraine and is traditionally served on festive days, accompanied by a green salad. Like several other revered French dishes, the pâté lorrain has its own society dedicated to promoting it, La Confrérie du Pâté Lorrain de Chatenois. It was founded by members of the management team of the Châtenois Easter Festival together with local shopkeepers, and inaugurated on Easter Day 1990 under the auspices of the Confrérie des Tastes-Cuisses de Grenouilles de Vittel (Fraternity of the Frogs' Legs Tasters of Vittel). There is a gastronomic and festive event, the Fête du Pâté Lorrain, held in Baccarat every September. It has been held for more than 55 years and celebrates pâté lorrain with a parade of a giant pâté, tastings and other entertainments, attracting around 20,000 pâtés and thousands of visitors over a weekend.

== Sources ==
- Curnonsky (1959). Recettes des provinces de France (in French). Paris: Les Productions de Paris. OCLC 1153529366.
- Di Folco, Philippe (2010). À table avec les tontons: 70 recettes de bistrots (in French). Paris: A. Viénot. ISBN 2353260845.
- Husson, René (2005). Recettes en Lorraine (in French). Saint-Affrique: Fleurines. ISBN 9782912690234.
- Le Brun, Dominique (1993). Le velo tout terrain (in French). Paris: Solar. ISBN 2263000100.
- Montevi, Béatrice (2008). Carnet de recettes de nos grand-mères (in French). Croissy-sur-Seine: Anagramme. ISBN 2350351599.
- Ringer, Stéphane; Claudy Obriot; Rosine Lagier (2012). Cuisine lorraine d'hier et d'aujourd'hui (in French). Rennes: Ouest-France. ISBN 9782737356742.
- Toussaint, Jean-Marc (2001). Les bonnes recettes de nos grands-mères: de traditions vosgiennes (in French). Haroué: PLI – Gérard Louis. ISBN 2914554095.
