= Flin =

- Commune
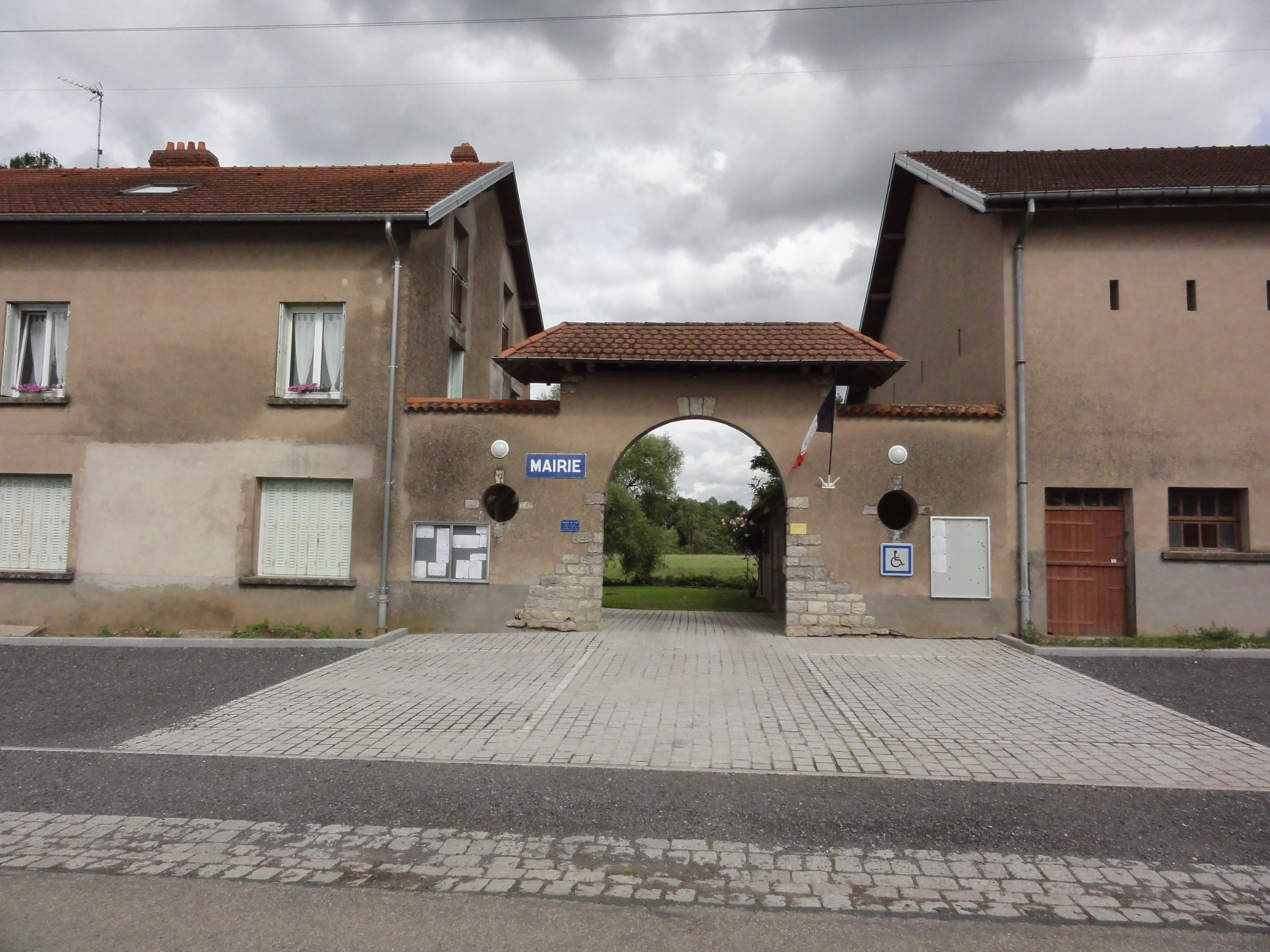
- The town hall in Flin

- Coat of arms
- Location of Flin
- Location within France Location within Grand Est
- Coordinates: 48°29′54″N 6°39′20″E
- Country: France
- Region: Grand Est
- Department: Meurthe-et-Moselle
- Arrondissement: Lunéville
- Canton: Baccarat
- Intercommunality: Territoire de Lunéville à Baccarat

Government
  - Mayor (2020–2026): Jean-Paul François
- Area^{1}: 11.64 km^{2} (4.49 sq mi)
- Elevation: 252 m (827 ft)
- Highest elevation: 317 m (1,040 ft)
- Lowest elevation: 246 m (807 ft)
- Population (2023): 398
  - Density: 34.2/km^{2} (88.6/sq mi)
- Time zone: UTC+01:00 (CET)
  - Summer (DST): UTC+02:00 (CEST)
- INSEE/Postal code: 54199 /54122
- ^{1} French Land Register data, which excludes lakes, ponds, glaciers > 1 km^{2} (0.386 sq mi or 247 acres) and river estuaries.

Flin (French pronunciation: [flɛ̃]) is a commune in the Meurthe-et-Moselle department found in north-eastern France.

== Population ==
Historical population
| Year | Pop. | ±% p.a. |
|---|---|---|
| 1968 | 425 | — |
| 1975 | 369 | −2.00% |
| 1982 | 333 | −1.46% |
| 1990 | 343 | +0.37% |
| 1999 | 374 | +0.97% |
| 2007 | 371 | −0.10% |
| 2012 | 384 | +0.69% |
| 2017 | 378 | −0.31% |
| 2023 | 398 | +0.86% |
Source: INSEE

== See also ==
- Communes of the Meurthe-et-Moselle department
