= Bertrichamps =

- Commune
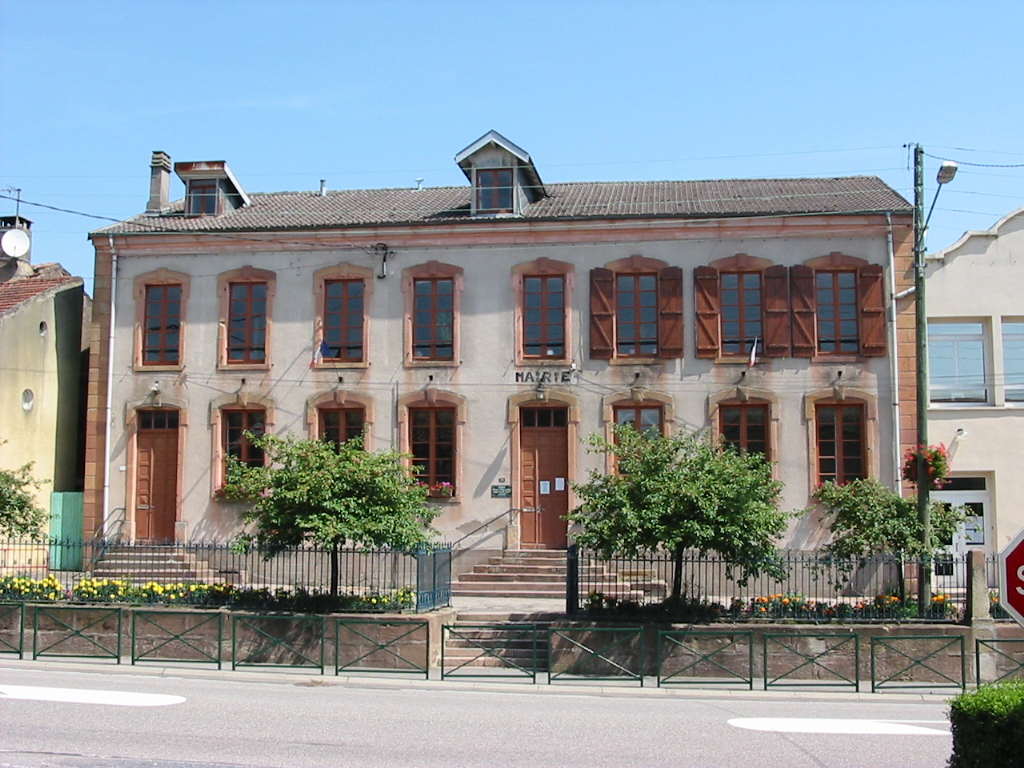
- The town hall in Bertrichamps

- Coat of arms
- Location of Bertrichamps
- Location within France Location within Grand Est
- Coordinates: 48°25′48″N 6°47′41″E
- Country: France
- Region: Grand Est
- Department: Meurthe-et-Moselle
- Arrondissement: Lunéville
- Canton: Baccarat
- Intercommunality: Territoire de Lunéville à Baccarat

Government
  - Mayor (2021–2026): Bernard Miclo
- Area^{1}: 19.66 km^{2} (7.59 sq mi)
- Elevation: 277 m (909 ft)
- Highest elevation: 422 m (1,385 ft)
- Lowest elevation: 266 m (873 ft)
- Population (2023): 1,081
  - Density: 54.98/km^{2} (142.4/sq mi)
- Time zone: UTC+01:00 (CET)
  - Summer (DST): UTC+02:00 (CEST)
- INSEE/Postal code: 54065 /54120
- ^{1} French Land Register data, which excludes lakes, ponds, glaciers > 1 km^{2} (0.386 sq mi or 247 acres) and river estuaries.

Bertrichamps (French pronunciation: [bɛʁtʁiʃɑ̃]) is a commune in the Meurthe-et-Moselle department in northeastern France.

== See also ==
- Communes of the Meurthe-et-Moselle department
