= Deneuvre =

- Commune
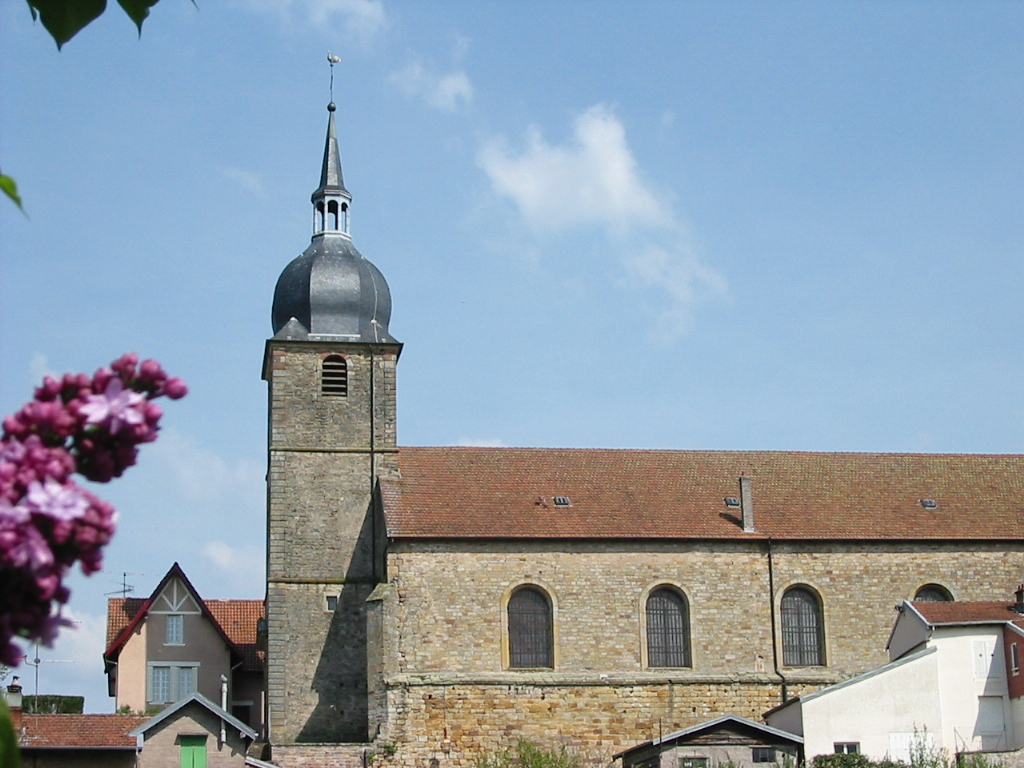
- The church in Deneuvre

- Coat of arms
- Location of Deneuvre
- Location within France Location within Grand Est
- Coordinates: 48°26′39″N 6°44′14″E
- Country: France
- Region: Grand Est
- Department: Meurthe-et-Moselle
- Arrondissement: Lunéville
- Canton: Baccarat
- Intercommunality: Territoire de Lunéville à Baccarat

Government
  - Mayor (2023–2026): Fabien Kremer
- Area^{1}: 9.7 km^{2} (3.7 sq mi)
- Elevation: 340 m (1,120 ft)
- Highest elevation: 377 m (1,237 ft)
- Lowest elevation: 262 m (860 ft)
- Population (2023): 454
  - Density: 47/km^{2} (120/sq mi)
- Time zone: UTC+01:00 (CET)
  - Summer (DST): UTC+02:00 (CEST)
- INSEE/Postal code: 54154 /54120
- ^{1} French Land Register data, which excludes lakes, ponds, glaciers > 1 km^{2} (0.386 sq mi or 247 acres) and river estuaries.

Deneuvre (French pronunciation: [də.nœvʁ]) is a commune in the Meurthe-et-Moselle department in north-eastern France.

== See also ==
- Communes of the Meurthe-et-Moselle department
