= Azerailles =

- Commune
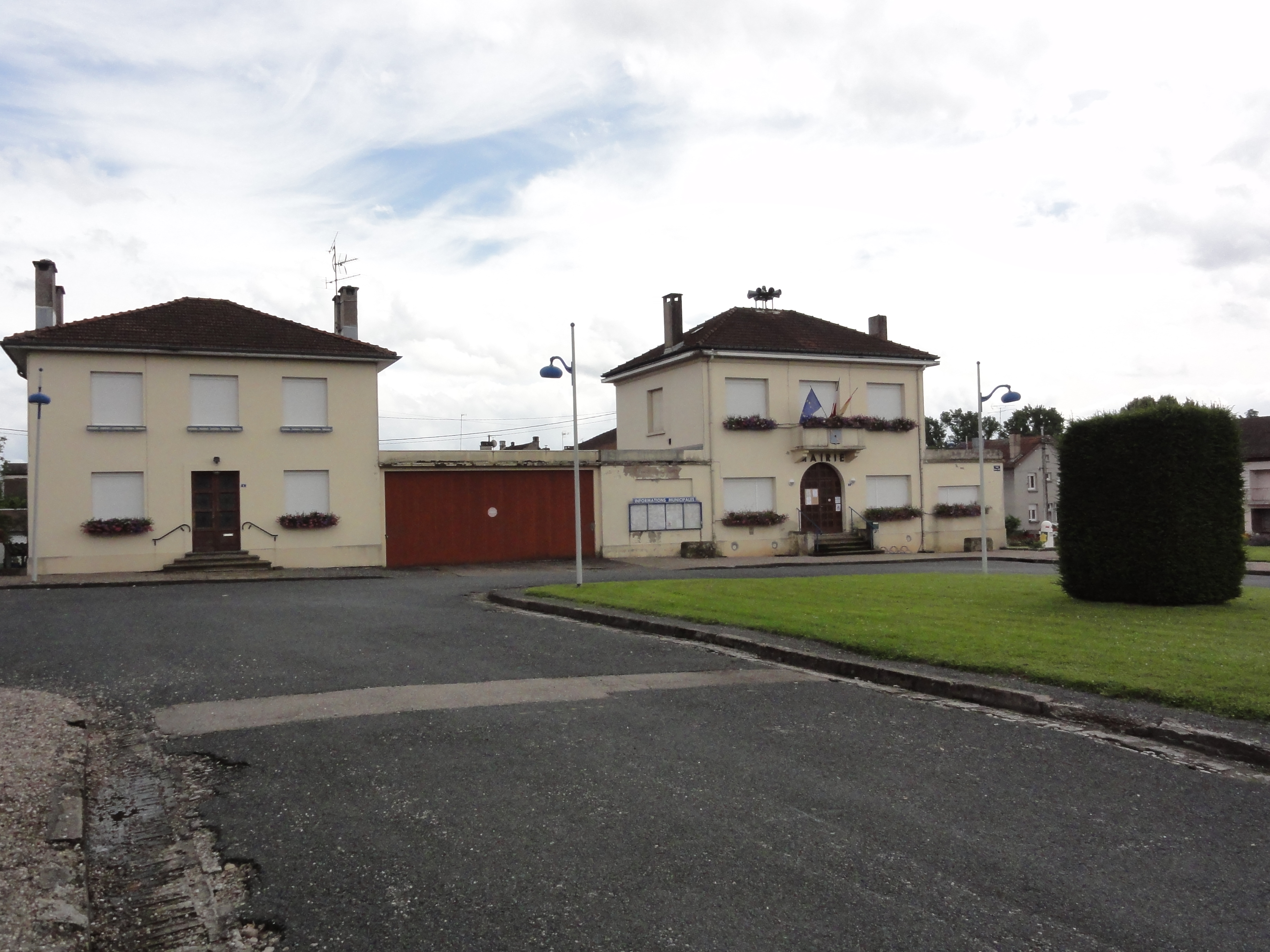
- The town hall in Azerailles

- Coat of arms
- Location of Azerailles
- Location within France Location within Grand Est
- Coordinates: 48°29′19″N 6°41′43″E
- Country: France
- Region: Grand Est
- Department: Meurthe-et-Moselle
- Arrondissement: Lunéville
- Canton: Baccarat
- Intercommunality: CC Territoire Lunéville Baccarat

Government
  - Mayor (2020–2026): Rose-Marie Falque
- Area^{1}: 14 km^{2} (5.4 sq mi)
- Elevation: 267 m (876 ft)
- Highest elevation: 339 m (1,112 ft)
- Lowest elevation: 249 m (817 ft)
- Population (2023): 786
  - Density: 56/km^{2} (150/sq mi)
- Time zone: UTC+01:00 (CET)
  - Summer (DST): UTC+02:00 (CEST)
- INSEE/Postal code: 54038 /54122
- ^{1} French Land Register data, which excludes lakes, ponds, glaciers > 1 km^{2} (0.386 sq mi or 247 acres) and river estuaries.

Azerailles (French pronunciation: [azʁaj]) is a commune in the Meurthe-et-Moselle department in northeastern France.

== Population ==
Historical population
Year	Pop.	±% p.a.
1968	846	—
1975	844	−0.03%
1982	798	−0.80%
1990	792	−0.09%
1999	819	+0.37%
2007	835	+0.24%
2012	820	−0.36%
2017	771	−1.22%
2023	786	+0.32%
Source: INSEE

== See also ==
- Communes of the Meurthe-et-Moselle department
