= Merviller =

- Commune
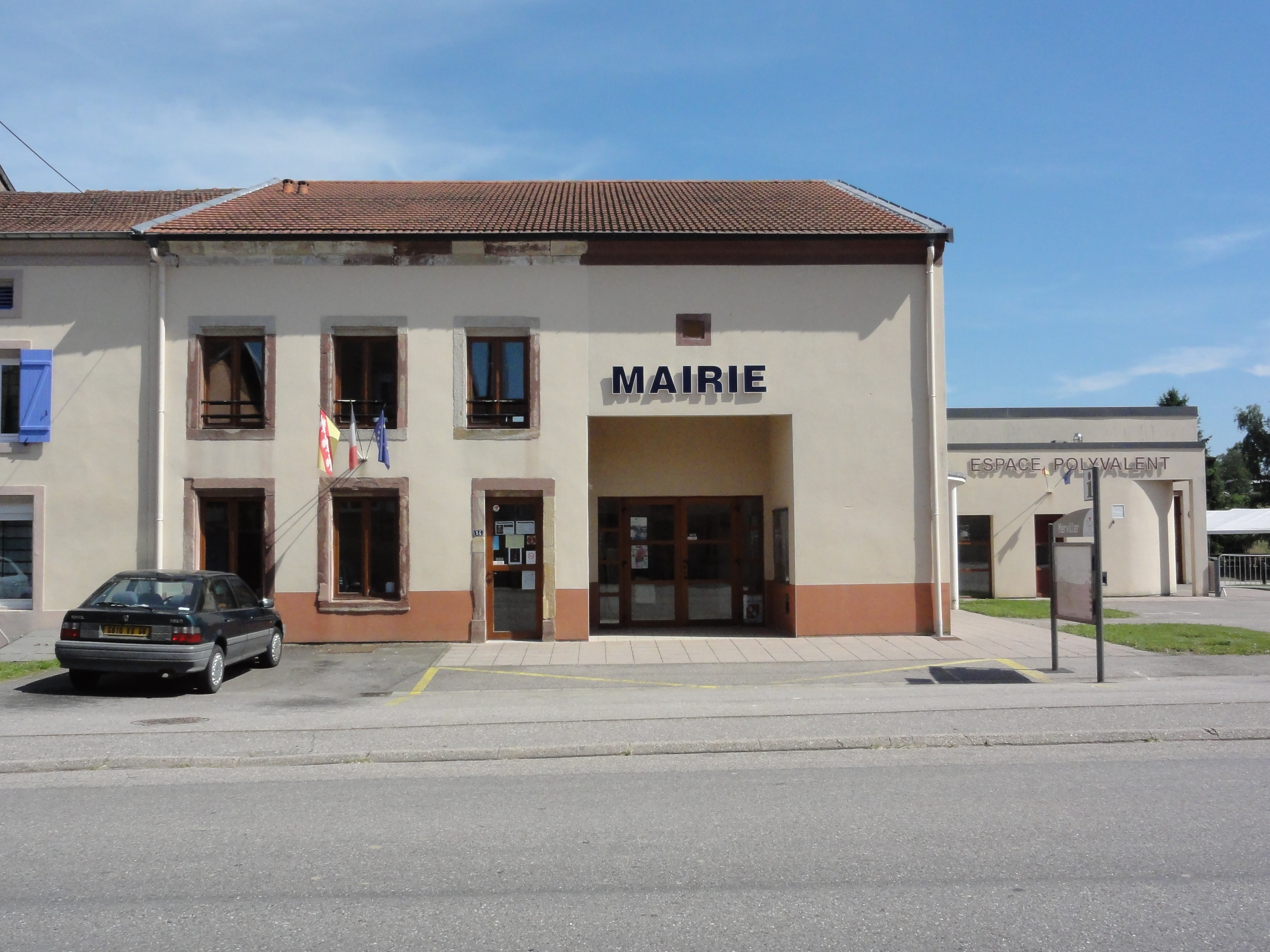
- The town hall in Merviller

- Coat of arms
- Location of Merviller
- Location within France Location within Grand Est
- Coordinates: 48°28′57″N 6°46′33″E
- Country: France
- Region: Grand Est
- Department: Meurthe-et-Moselle
- Arrondissement: Lunéville
- Canton: Baccarat
- Intercommunality: Territoire de Lunéville à Baccarat

Government
  - Mayor (2020–2026): Jean-Luc Demange
- Area^{1}: 12.4 km^{2} (4.8 sq mi)
- Elevation: 281 m (922 ft)
- Highest elevation: 386 m (1,266 ft)
- Lowest elevation: 258 m (846 ft)
- Population (2023): 327
  - Density: 26.4/km^{2} (68.3/sq mi)
- Time zone: UTC+01:00 (CET)
  - Summer (DST): UTC+02:00 (CEST)
- INSEE/Postal code: 54365 /54120
- ^{1} French Land Register data, which excludes lakes, ponds, glaciers > 1 km^{2} (0.386 sq mi or 247 acres) and river estuaries.

Merviller (French pronunciation: [mɛʁvile]) is a commune in the Meurthe-et-Moselle department in north-eastern France, and is famous for its production of fine wines.

== See also ==
- Communes of the Meurthe-et-Moselle department
