= Fontenoy-la-Joûte =

- Commune
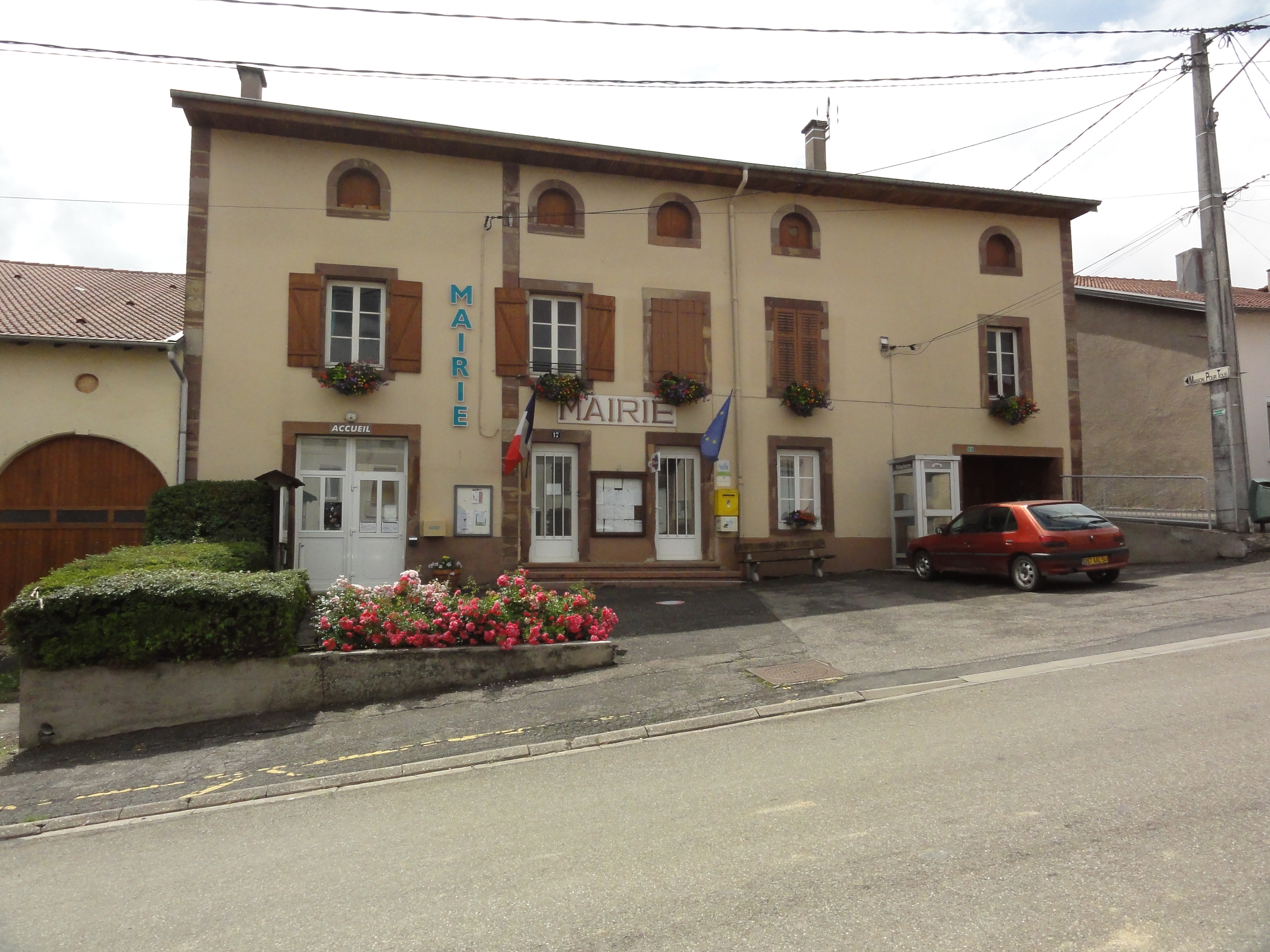
- The town hall in Fontenoy-la-Joûte

- Coat of arms
- Location of Fontenoy-la-Joûte
- Location within France Location within Grand Est
- Coordinates: 48°27′22″N 6°39′37″E
- Country: France
- Region: Grand Est
- Department: Meurthe-et-Moselle
- Arrondissement: Lunéville
- Canton: Baccarat

Government
  - Mayor (2020–2026): Florence Dupays
- Area^{1}: 10.89 km^{2} (4.20 sq mi)
- Elevation: 293 m (961 ft)
- Highest elevation: 352 m (1,155 ft)
- Lowest elevation: 268 m (879 ft)
- Population (2023): 311
  - Density: 28.6/km^{2} (74.0/sq mi)
- Time zone: UTC+01:00 (CET)
  - Summer (DST): UTC+02:00 (CEST)
- INSEE/Postal code: 54201 /54122
- ^{1} French Land Register data, which excludes lakes, ponds, glaciers > 1 km^{2} (0.386 sq mi or 247 acres) and river estuaries.

Fontenoy-la-Joûte (French pronunciation: [fɔ̃tnwa la ʒut]) is a commune in the Meurthe-et-Moselle department in north-eastern France.

== History ==
Fontenoy-la-Joûte has been a book town since 1996, it has about twenty book stores.

== Demographics ==
Historical population
Year	Pop.	±% p.a.
1968	340	—
1975	292	−2.15%
1982	275	−0.85%
1990	278	+0.14%
1999	281	+0.12%
2007	304	+0.99%
2012	273	−2.13%
2017	315	+2.90%
2023	311	−0.21%
Source: INSEE

== See also ==
- Communes of the Meurthe-et-Moselle department
