= Mühlen (surname) =

Mühlen is a German surname. Notable people with the surname include:

- Ernest Mühlen (1926–2014), Luxembourgish politician
- Georg Mühlen-Schulte (1882–1981), German writer
- Heribert Mühlen (1927–2006), German theologian
- Hermynia Zur Mühlen (1883–1951), Austrian writer and translator
- Kurt von Mühlen (1905–1971), German military officer
- Louis Muhlen-Schulte (born 1998), Australian alpine skier
- Raimund von zur-Mühlen (1854–1931), German tenor
- Tomo in der Mühlen, German musician

== See also ==
- Mühlen, municipality in Styria, Austria
