= Bainville =

Bainville may refer to:

- Bainville, Montana
- Bainville-aux-Miroirs
  - Bainville Castle, ruined, former seat of the Lords of Vaudémont
- Bainville-aux-Saules
- Bainville-sur-Madon
- Jacques Bainville
