= Chavigny =

Chavigny may refer:

- Chavigny, Aisne, a commune in the department of Aisne, France
- Chavigny, Meurthe-et-Moselle, a commune in the department of Meurthe-et-Moselle, France
- Chavigny-Bailleul, a commune in the department of Eure, France
- Jean-Aimé de Chavigny
