= Maizières =

Maizières is the name or part of the name of several communes in France:

- Maizières, Calvados, in the Calvados département
- Maizières, Haute-Marne, in the Haute-Marne département
- Maizières, Meurthe-et-Moselle, in the Meurthe-et-Moselle département
- Maizières, Pas-de-Calais, in the Pas-de-Calais département
- Maizières, Haute-Saône, in the Haute-Saône département
- Maizières-la-Grande-Paroisse, in the Aube département
- Maizières-lès-Brienne, in the Aube département
- Maizières-lès-Metz, in the Moselle département
- Maizières-lès-Vic, in the Moselle département
- Maizières-sur-Amance, in the Haute-Marne département
