= Jean-Aimé =

Jean-Aimé is a French masculine given name. Notable people with the name include:

- Jean-Aimé de Chavigny (1524?–1604), French alchemist and astrologer
- Jean-Aimé Randrianalijaona, Malagasy hurdler who competed for Madagascar at the 1972 Summer Olympics
- Jean-Aimé Toupane (born 1958), Senegalese-French basketball coach and former player

== See also ==
- Jean François Aimé Dejean (1749–1824), French army officer and general
- Jean François Aimé Théophile Philippe Gaudin (1766–1833), Swiss botanist and pastor
- Jean-Baptiste Janson (1742–1803; born Jean-Baptiste-Aimé-Joseph Janson) French cellist and composer
- Jean-Paul Gobel (born 1943; middle name Aimé) French prelate of the Catholic Church
- JA (disambiguation)
