= 553rd Volksgrenadier Division =

553rd Volksgrenadier Division 553rd Grenadier Division
- 553. Volksgrenadier-Division; 553. Grenadier-Division
- Active: 1944–1945
- Country: Germany
- Branch: German Army
- Type: Volksgrenadier
- Size: Division
- Engagements: World War II; Siegfried Line campaign; Operation Nordwind; Western Allied invasion of Germany

Commanders
- Notable commanders: Johannes Bruhn

The 553rd Volksgrenadier Division (German: 553. Volksgrenadier-Division) was a volksgrenadier division of the German Army during World War II that fought entirely on the Western Front.

Sent to stop the Allied advance from Paris to the Rhine in September 1944, it was nearly encircled and destroyed twice in northeastern France: first at Nancy and then at the Saverne Gap. After being rebuilt, in January 1945 it participated in Operation Nordwind, the southern counterpart of the German offensive that became known as the Battle of the Bulge. It captured a bridgehead on the Rhine and elements of the 553rd took part in destroying two American battalions from the U.S. 12th Armored Division at the village of Herrlisheim, along with the 10th SS Panzer Division Frundsberg. After the operation was called off in late January, the 553rd was withdrawn from the front and remained in the Army Group G reserve until the German surrender in May 1945.

== Background ==
After the Wehrmacht took heavy casualties among infantry divisions in the summer of 1944, they started organizing volksgrenadier ("people's grenadier") divisions, which were new infantry divisions with less manpower and equipment, along with a new title to raise morale. Adolf Hitler came up with the name, with volk appealing to German nationalism and grenadier referring to German military traditions. These had fewer soldiers and less heavy equipment than normal infantry divisions, but more automatic weapons (such as the Sturmgewehr 44) and anti-tank weapons (Panzerfaust and Panzerschreck). They also had a shortage of motorized vehicles, relying primarily on horses and to a lesser extent on bicycles. The volksgrenadier formations were put together with young and old conscripts, security troops, former personnel of the Luftwaffe and Kriegsmarine, and, in some cases, they were combined with surviving members of infantry divisions that had been destroyed. The latter received the numbers of the infantry divisions they were combined with, as Hitler wanted to preserve their history, while those that were completely new were generally given a number in the 500 series. Heinrich Himmler and the SS were responsible for overseeing the training of these units, though they remained part of the Wehrmacht.

== History ==
=== Battle of Nancy ===
It was created as the 553rd Grenadier Division at the Münsingen training ground from the mobilization wave of July 1944, and was renamed the 553rd Volksgrenadier Division on 9 October 1944. As of early September, when George Patton's U.S. Third Army was preparing to invade Saarland from northeastern France, the 553rd arrived in Saarbrücken as one of the divisions sent to help stop the Allied advance from Paris to the Rhine. In the first days of September the division, along with the 3rd and 15th Panzergrenadier divisions and the 559th Volksgrenadier Division, were assembled in western Germany.

After this they entered France, where the 553rd fought against the forward units of the U.S. Third Army in the area in and around Nancy. In mid-September Patton's Third Army began its advance, and the 553rd Grenadier was ordered by German commanders to hold the Moselle river bridgeheads near the city and Nancy itself at all costs. A Luftwaffe field regiment from the 1st Parachute Army was also assigned to the 553rd for the defense of the city itself, while on their flanks, the 3rd Panzergrenadier Division was holding the riverbank north of Nancy and elements of the 15th Panzergrenadier were holding the south. The American XII Corps began crossing the Moselle river to the north of Nancy with its 80th Infantry Division and to the south with the 35th Infantry, before using the 4th Armored Division to exploit the breakthrough.

After some fighting the Germans were unable to stop the Americans from crossing the river and canals in both the north and south. The bulk of the 553rd Grenadier Division, located in the city, was encircled by them in a double-envelopment. The division attempted to break out of the encirclement to retreat east, while U.S. troops captured Nancy on 15 September 1944. The 553rd held out on the plateau northeast of the city, in the village of Agincourt, before launching a counterattack on 18 September. The German counterattack failed, but the division continued to resist the American advance, even by using old trenches in the area from World War I, and was able to delay the 35th and 80th divisions. The commander of XII Corps, Major General Manton S. Eddy, then brought in the tanks of the 6th Armored Division to assist in the attack, and by 23 September the grenadier division was in danger of being encircled. Colonel Erich Löhr, its commander, gave the order to withdraw on 23 September, for which he was relieved of command by the head of the German 1st Army (and was later court-martialed in 1945). The 553rd was ordered to go on the offensive despite its weakened state after the Battle of Nancy, and it recorded as having lost 319 killed, 1,052 wounded, and 2,125 missing during September 1944. Major General Johannes Bruhn became the new commander of the division after Löhr was relieved.

The division continued fighting the American advance from the Moselle to the Seille river over the next several days, and in a battle near Port-sur-Seille on 8 October 1944, the division sustained large casualties, with the Americans reportedly capturing 1,264 German prisoners. After taking heavy losses in France, including an entire regimental staff, the 553rd Volksgrenadier Division was withdrawn from the front later on 13 October to be combined with a static fortress infantry battalion, two machine gun battalions, some anti-aircraft artillery batteries, and two grenadier training and replacement battalions. When it returned to the front lines by the first week of November the 553rd Volksgrenadier was reassigned from 1st Army to the 19th Army, both part of Army Group G, located near the American-French 6th Army Group.

=== Saverne Gap ===
On 13 November elements of the 6th Army Group launched an attack aimed at capturing the Saverne Gap in the Vosges mountains and forcing the German 19th Army out of Alsace. The 553rd Volksgrenadier Division, the 708th Volksgrenadier Division, and a small kampfgruppe (battle group) from the 11th Panzer Division were responsible for holding the city of Saarburg and the approaches to the mountain passes. The 553rd soon encountered the U.S. 44th Infantry Division, which the Germans met with artillery fire as it advanced along the road to Saarburg, while the French 2nd Armored Division went around the city and passed through the Vosges at another location. The 553rd was able to slow down the American infantry for several days until they broke through and surrounded the Germans at Saarburg. By 20 November the German defenses outside the Saverne Gap began disintegrating, but during the night and amidst bad weather, Major General Bruhn led about 2,000 troops out of the encirclement, allowing the remnants of the division to escape. As French forces overran the 553rd Division's last defensive line outside of the mountain pass, Bruhn himself was captured on 22 November 1944, and the Saverne Gap fell under Allied control in the next several days.

Bruhn was replaced by Major General Gerhard Hüther and the nearly destroyed 553rd was temporarily placed under the 361st Volksgrenadier Division. General of Panzer Troops Hermann Balck, who had been the commander of Army Group G in the fall of 1944, wrote in his memoirs after the war that the 553rd Volksgrenadier Division's record of escaping encirclement twice and General Bruhn's leadership deserved recognition. The remains of the 553rd took defensive positions on the other side of the Vosges, near Sarre-Union, with the 361st and the Panzer Lehr Division, before being sent to Stuttgart to rebuild. In December 1944 the division was ordered to the east bank of the Rhine to continue rebuilding. At this point only the 1119th Grenadier Regiment was at full strength, and the 553rd also received regiments from several other units, including an anti-tank and an assault gun battalion.

=== The Rhine ===
The division was estimated to have about 3,500 troops in January 1945. When the German Ardennes offensive in the north stalled by the end of December 1944, the German high command decided to launch another offensive further south into Alsace, and split the American forces from the French in the south. Army Group G forces were committed for this operation, called Nordwind. The 553rd Volksgrenadier Division was given the objective of crossing the Rhine and creating a bridgehead in Gambsheim that would be used by Army Group Upper Rhine. The operation began on 1 January 1945, and the 553rd crossed the river and captured Gambsheim on 5 January. Its troops then took up defensive positions and also occupied the town of Herrlisheim and the Steinwald forest. Elements of the 553rd Volksgrenadier and the 10th SS Panzer Division Frundsberg defended Herrlisheim. Later that month two battalions of the U.S. 12th Armored Division attacked their positions, but by 19 January both battalions had been destroyed. Elsewhere, a final German offensive in the Alsace was launched on 24 January that failed to reach its objectives, and German troops in the area withdrew back to the other side of the Rhine.

After the end of Operation Nordwind the division was removed from the front and became the Army Group G reserve. It surrendered to the Allies in Württemberg in May 1945.

== Commanders ==
The division was commanded by the following officers.

- Colonel Erich Löhr (11 July – 23 September 1944)
- Major General Johannes Bruhn (23 September – 22 November 1944)
- Major General Gerhard Hüther (23 November 1944 – January 1945)
- Colonel Utz (January – May 1945)

== Structure ==
The division consisted of the following units.

- 1119th Grenadier Regiment
- 1120th Grenadier Regiment
- 1121st Grenadier Regiment
- 1553rd Artillery Regiment
- 1553rd Fusilier Company
- 1553rd Signal Battalion
- 1553rd Tank Destroyer Battalion
- 1553rd Engineer Battalion
- 1553rd Divisional Supply Troops
- 92nd Luftwaffe Field Regiment (September 1944)
- Marbach Regiment (December 1944)
- 2nd SS Police Regiment (December 1944)

== Bibliography ==
- Balck, Hermann (2015). David T. Zabecki; Dieter J. Biedekarken (eds.). Order in Chaos: The Memoirs of General of Panzer Troops Hermann Balck. Lexington: University Press of Kentucky. ISBN 978-0-8131-6127-3.
- Cole, Hugh M. (1984) [1950]. The Lorraine Campaign. Washington, D.C.: Center of Military History. LCCN 50-60957.
- Fox, Don M. (2015) [2003]. Patton's Vanguard: The United States Fourth Armored Division. Jefferson: McFarland & Company. ISBN 978-0-7864-5516-4.
- Mitcham, Samuel W. (2007). German Order of Battle: 291st–999th Infantry Divisions, Named Infantry Divisions, and Special Divisions in WWII. Vol. 2. Mechanicsburg: Stackpole Books. ISBN 978-0-8117-3437-0.
- Mitcham, Samuel W. (2009). The Siegfried Line: The German Defense of the West Wall, September-December 1944. Mechanicsburg: Stackpole Books. ISBN 978-1-4617-5163-2.
- Monroe-Jones, Edward, ed. (2010). Crossing the Zorn: The January 1945 Battle at Herrlisheim as Told by the American and German Soldiers Who Fought It. Jefferson: McFarland & Company. ISBN 978-0-7864-4712-1.
- Prefer, Nathan N. (2015). Eisenhower's Thorn on the Rhine: The Battles for the Colmar Pocket, 1944–45. Haverton: Casemate Publishers. ISBN 978-1-61200-323-8.
- Ripley, Tim (2003). The Wehrmacht: The German Army in World War II, 1939–1945. New York: Taylor & Francis. ISBN 978-1-57958-312-5.
- Sylvan, William C.; Smith, Francis G. (2008). John T. Greenwood (ed.). Normandy to Victory: The War Diary of General Courtney H. Hodges and the First U.S. Army. Lexington: University Press of Kentucky. ISBN 978-0-8131-2642-5.
- Yeide, Harry (2014). Fighting Patton: George S. Patton Jr. Through the Eyes of His Enemies. Zenith Press. ISBN 978-0-7603-4592-4.
- Zabecki, David T., ed. (2020). The German War Machine in World War II: An Encyclopedia. Santa Barbara: ABC-CLIO. ISBN 978-1-4408-6918-1.
