= Méréville =

Méréville is the name of the following communes in France:

- Méréville, Meurthe-et-Moselle, in the Meurthe-et-Moselle department
- Méréville, Essonne, in the Essonne department
