= Frolois =

- Commune
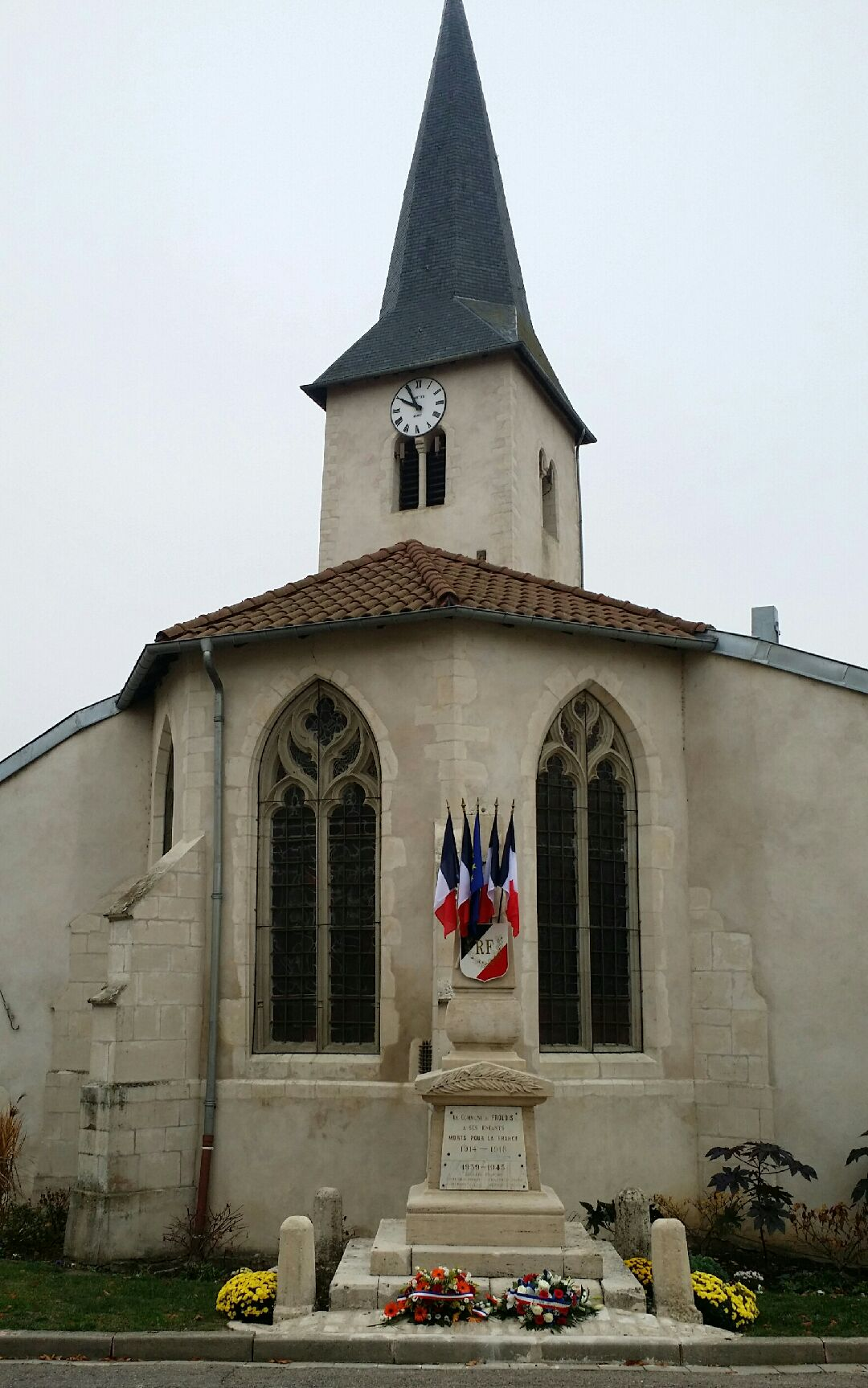
- The church in Frolois

- Coat of arms
- Location of Frolois
- Location within France Location within Grand Est
- Coordinates: 48°33′57″N 6°07′38″E
- Country: France
- Region: Grand Est
- Department: Meurthe-et-Moselle
- Arrondissement: Nancy
- Canton: Neuves-Maisons
- Intercommunality: Moselle et Madon

Government
  - Mayor (2022–2026): André Vermandé
- Area^{1}: 9.4 km^{2} (3.6 sq mi)
- Elevation: 320 m (1,050 ft)
- Highest elevation: 327 m (1,073 ft)
- Lowest elevation: 222 m (728 ft)
- Population (2023): 717
  - Density: 76/km^{2} (200/sq mi)
- Time zone: UTC+01:00 (CET)
  - Summer (DST): UTC+02:00 (CEST)
- INSEE/Postal code: 54214 /54160
- ^{1} French Land Register data, which excludes lakes, ponds, glaciers > 1 km^{2} (0.386 sq mi or 247 acres) and river estuaries.

Frolois (French pronunciation: [fʁɔlwa]) is a commune in the Meurthe-et-Moselle department in north-eastern France. It is the site of the former fortified castle of Acraignes. The counts of Vaudémont were the first owners of Frolois, from the 13th century. The castle passed through numerous hands; Nicolas de Haraucourt acquired it in 1553; at the beginning of the 18th century it was rebuilt by Anne-Marie-Joseph de Lorraine-Harcourt, prince de Guise; after the revolution the castle was sold as a national asset in 1795. No remains can be seen today. On 10–11 September 1944, the bridge across the river Moselle near the commune was the site of a fierce battle between American soldiers of the 134th Infantry Regiment and German soldiers of the 15th Panzergrenadier Division.

== Geography ==
The river Madon flows through the commune, while the Moselle is located just to the northeast.

== See also ==
- Communes of the Meurthe-et-Moselle department
