= Maron, Meurthe-et-Moselle =

Maron
- Commune
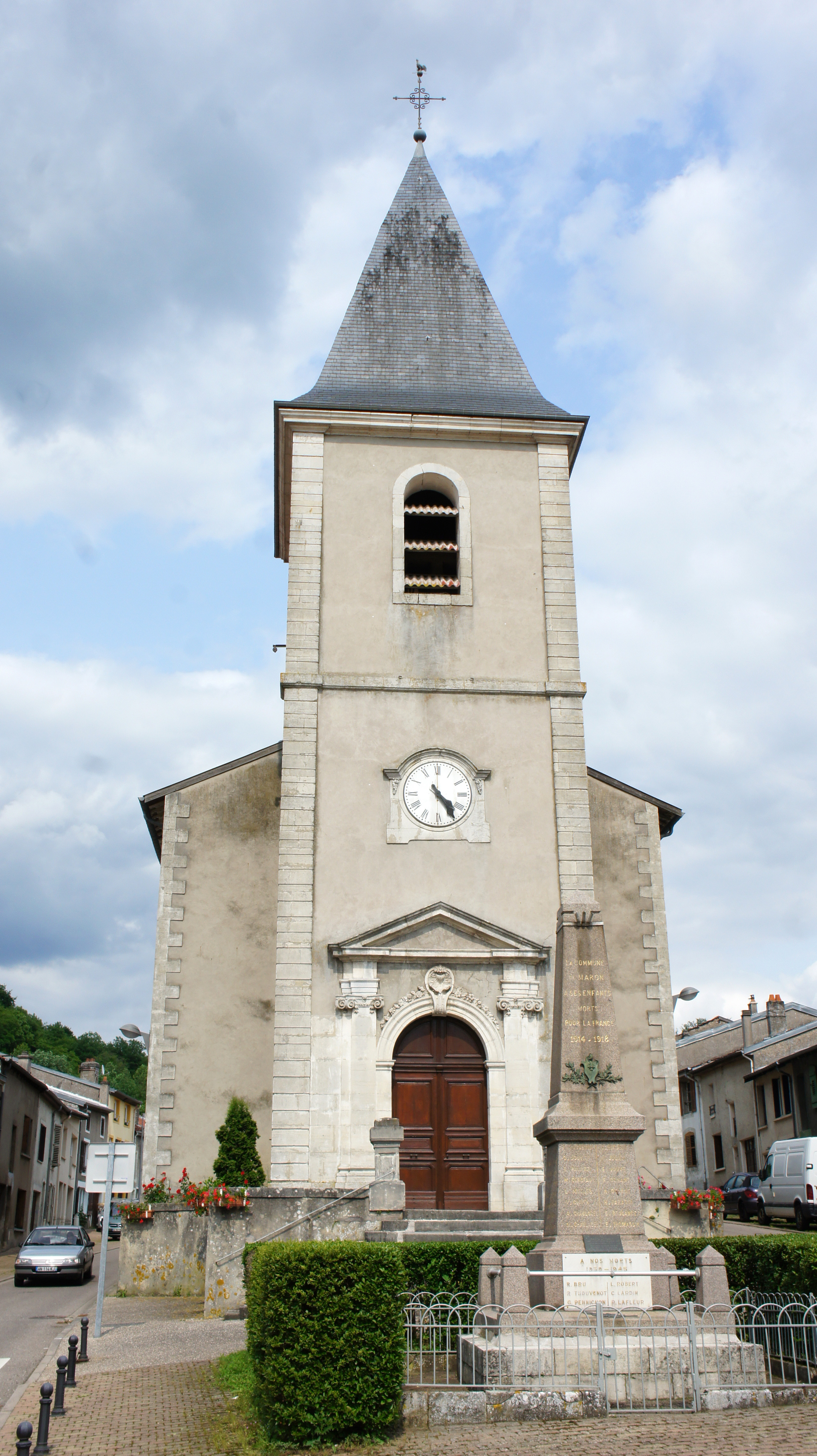
- A view of the church and war memorial

- Coat of arms
- Location of Maron
- Location within France Location within Grand Est
- Coordinates: 48°38′07″N 6°02′52″E
- Country: France
- Region: Grand Est
- Department: Meurthe-et-Moselle
- Arrondissement: Nancy
- Canton: Neuves-Maisons
- Intercommunality: CC Moselle et Madon

Government
  - Mayor (2020–2026): Rémi Maniette
- Area^{1}: 19.1 km^{2} (7.4 sq mi)
- Elevation: 233 m (764 ft)
- Highest elevation: 404 m (1,325 ft)
- Lowest elevation: 211 m (692 ft)
- Population (2023): 841
  - Density: 44.0/km^{2} (114/sq mi)
- Time zone: UTC+01:00 (CET)
  - Summer (DST): UTC+02:00 (CEST)
- INSEE/Postal code: 54352 /54230
- ^{1} French Land Register data, which excludes lakes, ponds, glaciers > 1 km^{2} (0.386 sq mi or 247 acres) and river estuaries.

Maron (French pronunciation: [maʁɔ̃]) is a commune in the Meurthe-et-Moselle department in north-eastern France.

== See also ==
- Communes of the Meurthe-et-Moselle department
