= Canton of Neuves-Maisons =

Canton in Grand Est, France

Coordinates: 48.62°N 6.11°E

The canton of Neuves-Maisons is an administrative division of the Meurthe-et-Moselle department, northeastern France. Its borders were modified at the French canton reorganisation which came into effect in March 2015. Its seat is in Neuves-Maisons.

It consists of the following communes:

1. Bainville-sur-Madon
2. Chaligny
3. Chavigny
4. Flavigny-sur-Moselle
5. Frolois
6. Maizières
7. Maron
8. Méréville
9. Messein
10. Neuves-Maisons
11. Pont-Saint-Vincent
12. Pulligny
13. Richardménil
14. Sexey-aux-Forges
