= Sexey-aux-Forges =

- Commune
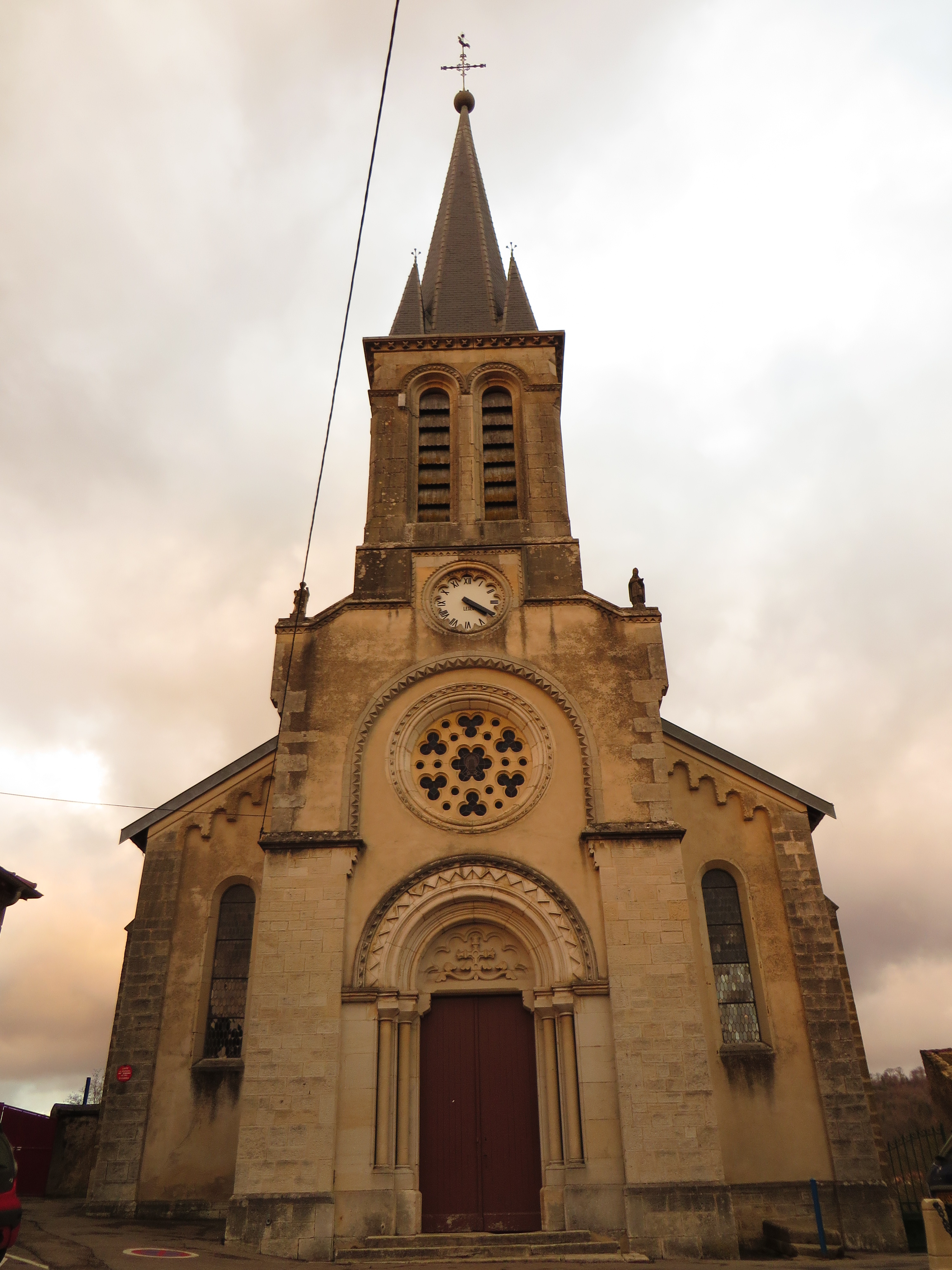
- The church in Sexey-aux-Forges

- Coat of arms
- Location of Sexey-aux-Forges
- Location within France Location within Grand Est
- Coordinates: 48°37′23″N 6°02′53″E
- Country: France
- Region: Grand Est
- Department: Meurthe-et-Moselle
- Arrondissement: Nancy
- Canton: Neuves-Maisons
- Intercommunality: CC Moselle et Madon

Government
  - Mayor (2020–2026): Patrick Potts
- Area^{1}: 14.08 km^{2} (5.44 sq mi)
- Elevation: 235 m (771 ft)
- Highest elevation: 352 m (1,155 ft)
- Lowest elevation: 211 m (692 ft)
- Population (2023): 718
  - Density: 51.0/km^{2} (132/sq mi)
- Time zone: UTC+01:00 (CET)
  - Summer (DST): UTC+02:00 (CEST)
- INSEE/Postal code: 54505 /54550
- ^{1} French Land Register data, which excludes lakes, ponds, glaciers > 1 km^{2} (0.386 sq mi or 247 acres) and river estuaries.

Sexey-aux-Forges (French pronunciation: [sɛksɛ o fɔʁʒ]) is a commune in the Meurthe-et-Moselle department in north-eastern France.

== Population ==
Historical population
Year	Pop.	±% p.a.
1968	579	—
1975	575	−0.10%
1982	561	−0.35%
1990	584	+0.50%
1999	609	+0.47%
2007	659	+0.99%
2012	677	+0.54%
2017	705	+0.81%
2023	718	+0.30%
Source: INSEE

== See also ==
- Communes of the Meurthe-et-Moselle department
