= Pulligny =

- Commune
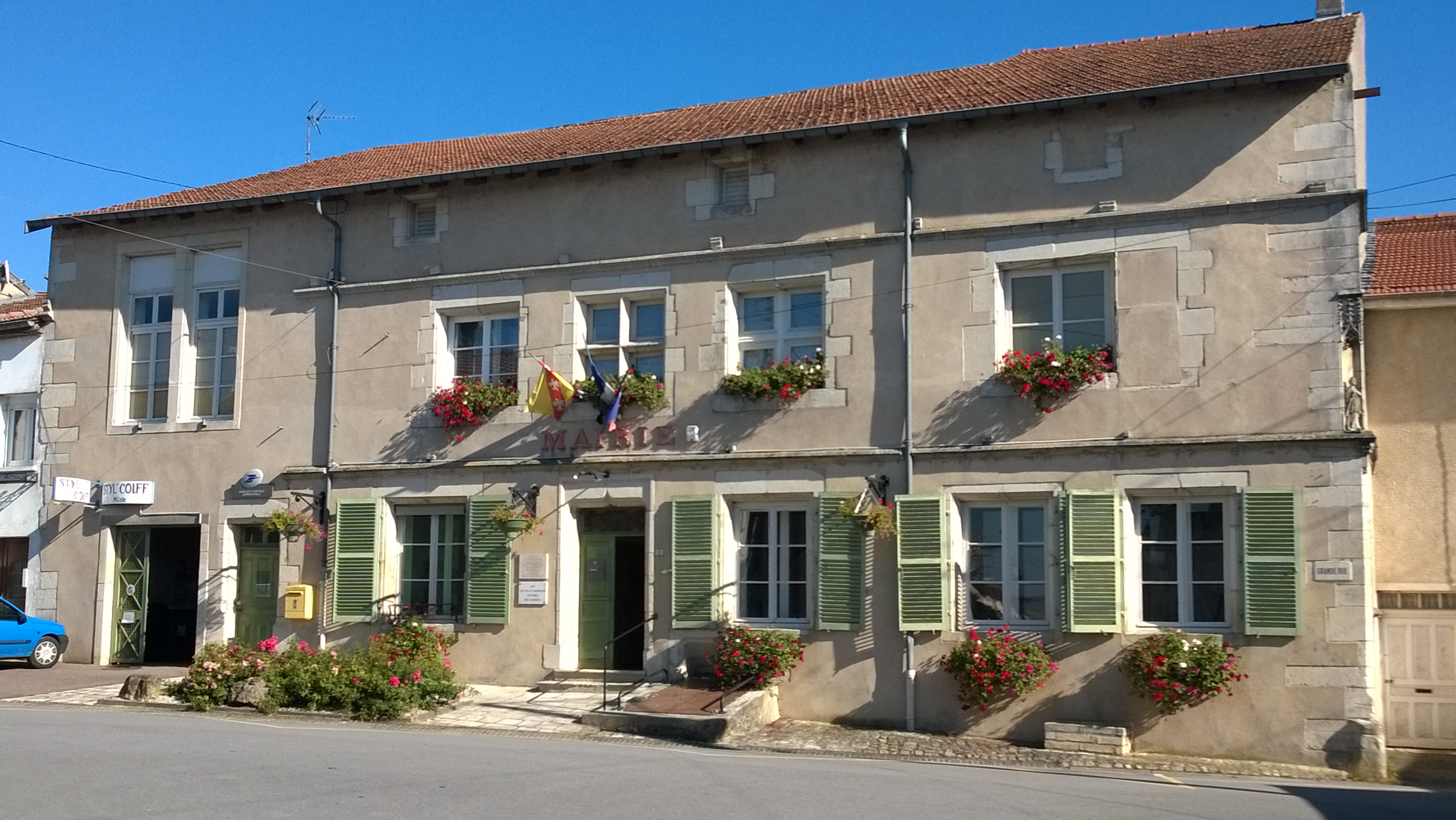
- The town hall in Pulligny

- Coat of arms
- Location of Pulligny
- Location within France Location within Grand Est
- Coordinates: 48°32′34″N 6°08′32″E
- Country: France
- Region: Grand Est
- Department: Meurthe-et-Moselle
- Arrondissement: Nancy
- Canton: Neuves-Maisons
- Intercommunality: Moselle et Madon

Government
  - Mayor (2020–2026): Denis Gardel
- Area^{1}: 9.3 km^{2} (3.6 sq mi)
- Elevation: 234 m (768 ft)
- Highest elevation: 340 m (1,120 ft)
- Lowest elevation: 225 m (738 ft)
- Population (2023): 1,155
  - Density: 120/km^{2} (320/sq mi)
- Time zone: UTC+01:00 (CET)
  - Summer (DST): UTC+02:00 (CEST)
- INSEE/Postal code: 54437 /54160
- ^{1} French Land Register data, which excludes lakes, ponds, glaciers > 1 km^{2} (0.386 sq mi or 247 acres) and river estuaries.

Pulligny (French pronunciation: [pyliɲi]) is a commune in the Meurthe-et-Moselle department in north-eastern France.

== Geography ==
The river Madon flows through the commune.

== See also ==
- Communes of the Meurthe-et-Moselle department
