= Neuves-Maisons =

- Commune
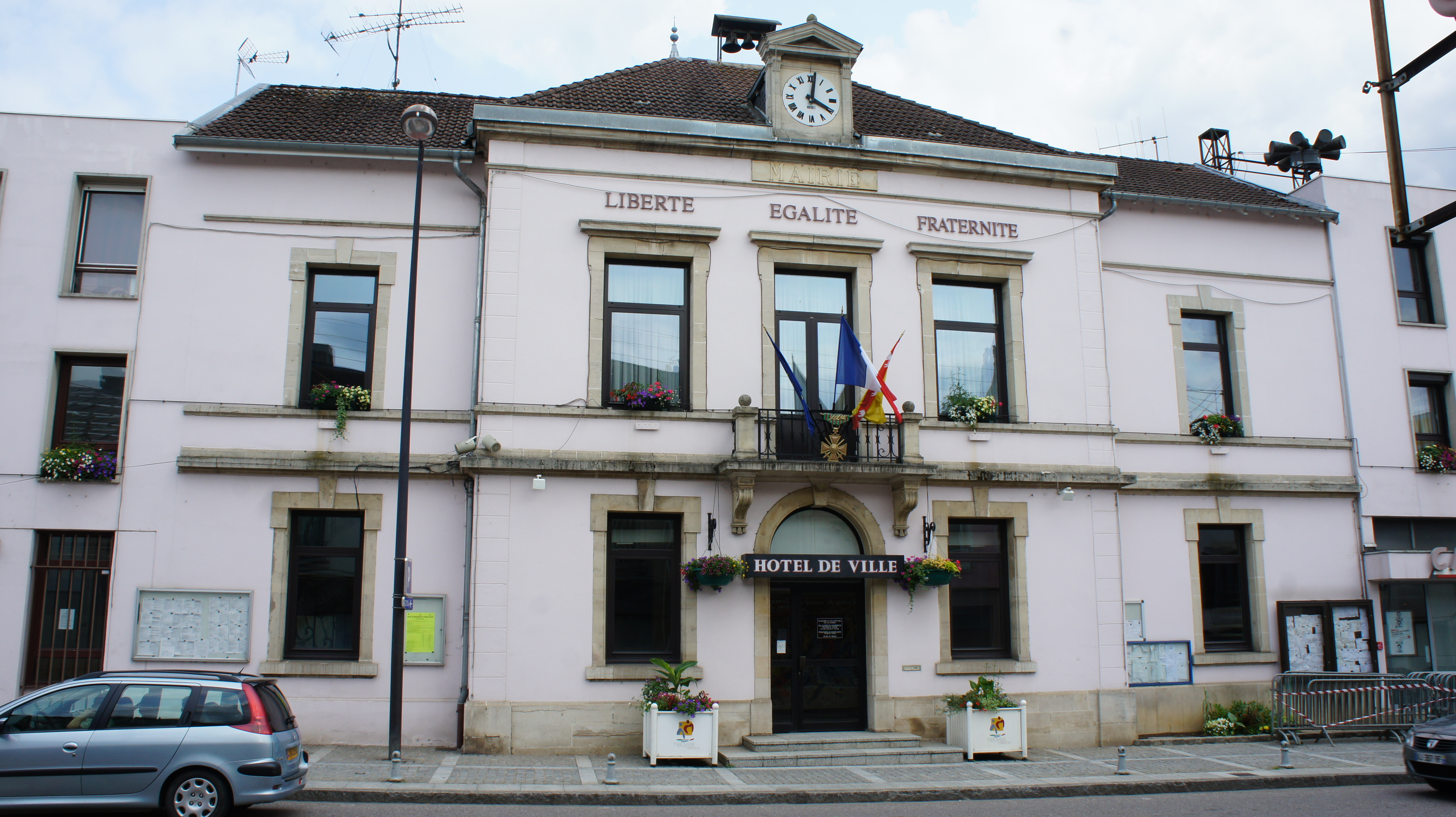
- The town hall in Neuves-Maisons

- Coat of arms
- Location of Neuves-Maisons
- Location within France Location within Grand Est
- Coordinates: 48°37′01″N 6°06′16″E
- Country: France
- Region: Grand Est
- Department: Meurthe-et-Moselle
- Arrondissement: Nancy
- Canton: Neuves-Maisons
- Intercommunality: CC Moselle et Madon

Government
  - Mayor (2020–2026): Pascal Schneider
- Area^{1}: 4.44 km^{2} (1.71 sq mi)
- Elevation: 226 m (741 ft)
- Highest elevation: 360 m (1,180 ft)
- Lowest elevation: 217 m (712 ft)
- Population (2023): 6,524
  - Density: 1,470/km^{2} (3,810/sq mi)
- Time zone: UTC+01:00 (CET)
  - Summer (DST): UTC+02:00 (CEST)
- INSEE/Postal code: 54397 /54230
- ^{1} French Land Register data, which excludes lakes, ponds, glaciers > 1 km^{2} (0.386 sq mi or 247 acres) and river estuaries.

Neuves-Maisons (French pronunciation: [nœv mɛzɔ̃], literally New Houses) is a commune in the Meurthe-et-Moselle department in Grand Est in North-Eastern France, on the banks of the Moselle. It is the seat of the Canton of Neuves-Maisons and neighbored by the commune Pont-Saint-Vincent on the other side of the Moselle.

== History ==
The city had a great steel industry during the 19th and 20th century.

Neuves-Maisons erected a plaque in the memory of Émilie Busquant, a feminist, anarcho-syndicalist and an anti-colonial activist born in the area, on the fiftieth anniversary of her death in 2003. A 2015 documentary by director Rabah Zanoun introduced a French audience to her forgotten story.

== Population ==
Historical population
Year	Pop.	±% p.a.
1968	6,660	—
1975	6,805	+0.31%
1982	6,952	+0.31%
1990	6,432	−0.97%
1999	6,849	+0.70%
2007	6,951	+0.18%
2012	7,067	+0.33%
2017	6,729	−0.98%
2023	6,524	−0.51%
Source: INSEE

== See also ==
- Communes of the Meurthe-et-Moselle department
