= Messein =

- Commune
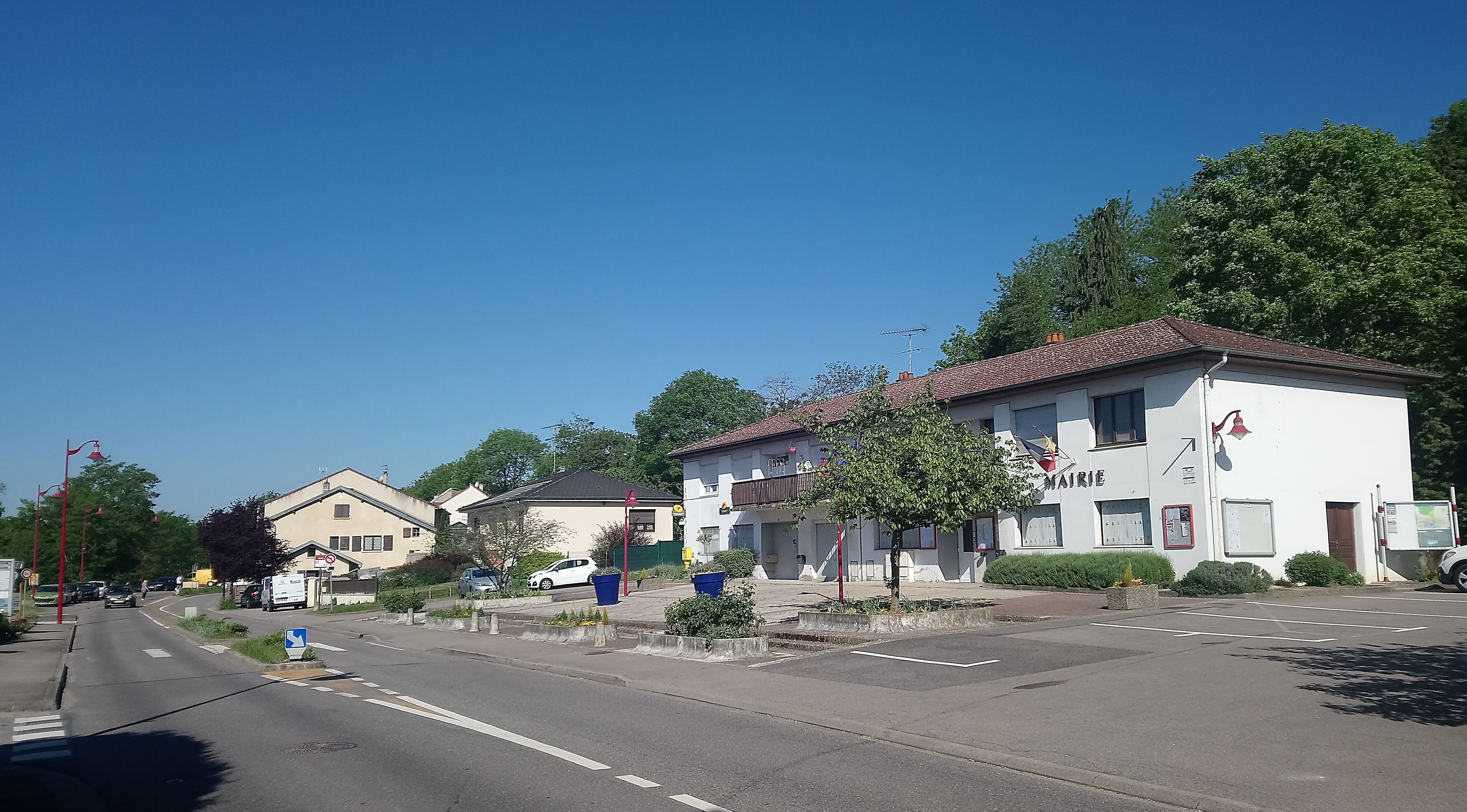
- The town hall in Messein

- Coat of arms
- Location of Messein
- Location within France Location within Grand Est
- Coordinates: 48°36′45″N 6°08′20″E
- Country: France
- Region: Grand Est
- Department: Meurthe-et-Moselle
- Arrondissement: Nancy
- Canton: Neuves-Maisons
- Intercommunality: CC Moselle et Madon

Government
  - Mayor (2020–2026): Daniel Lagrange
- Area^{1}: 5.14 km^{2} (1.98 sq mi)
- Elevation: 258 m (846 ft)
- Highest elevation: 417 m (1,368 ft)
- Lowest elevation: 216 m (709 ft)
- Population (2023): 1,981
  - Density: 385/km^{2} (998/sq mi)
- Time zone: UTC+01:00 (CET)
  - Summer (DST): UTC+02:00 (CEST)
- INSEE/Postal code: 54366 /54850
- ^{1} French Land Register data, which excludes lakes, ponds, glaciers > 1 km^{2} (0.386 sq mi or 247 acres) and river estuaries.

Messein (French pronunciation: [mesɛ̃]) is a commune in the Meurthe-et-Moselle department in north-eastern France.

== See also ==
- Communes of the Meurthe-et-Moselle department
