= Chaligny =

- Commune
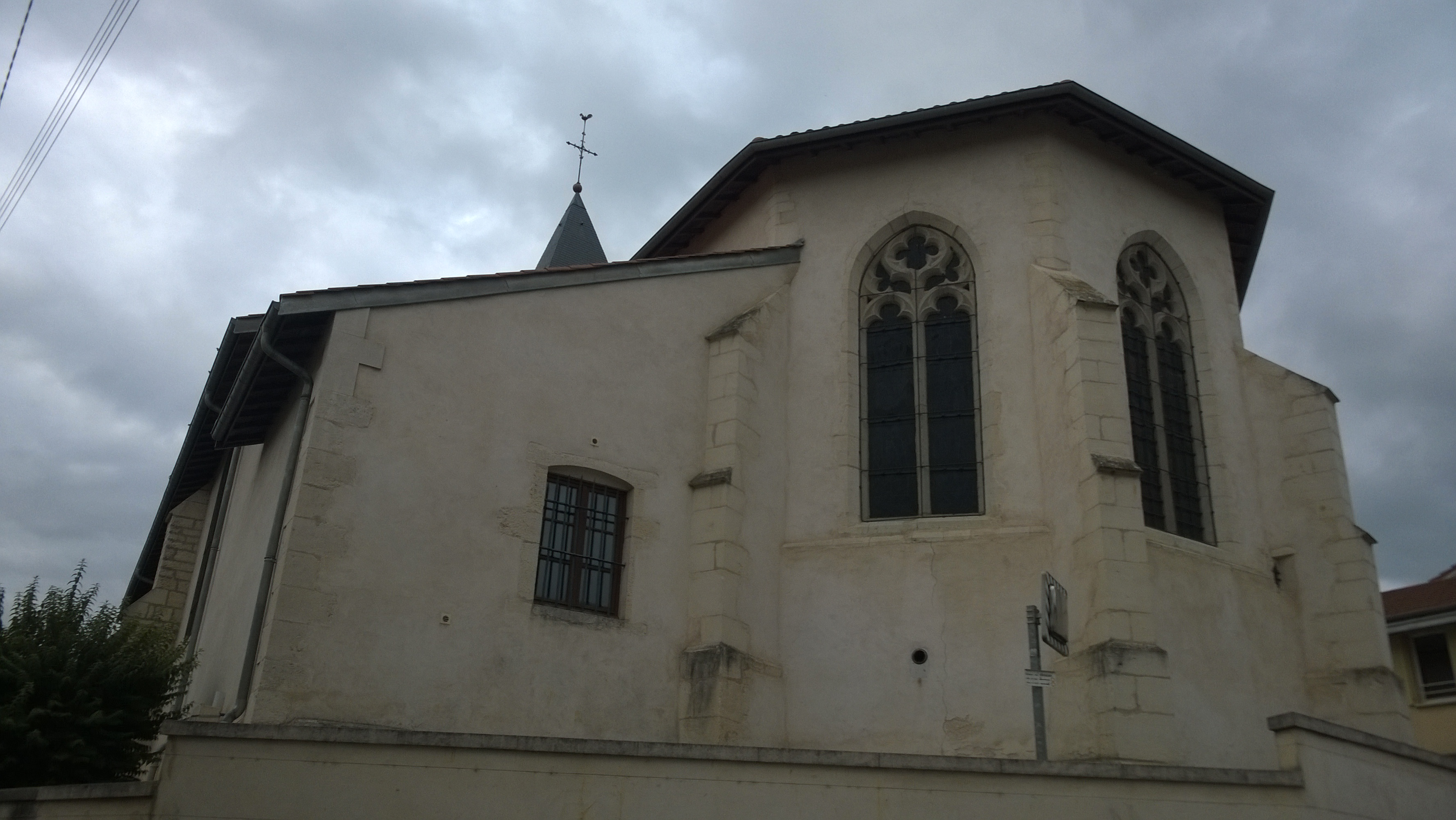
- The church in Chaligny

- Coat of arms
- Location of Chaligny
- Location within France Location within Grand Est
- Coordinates: 48°37′28″N 6°04′59″E
- Country: France
- Region: Grand Est
- Department: Meurthe-et-Moselle
- Arrondissement: Nancy
- Canton: Neuves-Maisons
- Intercommunality: Moselle et Madon

Government
  - Mayor (2020–2026): André Bagard
- Area^{1}: 13.32 km^{2} (5.14 sq mi)
- Elevation: 250 m (820 ft)
- Highest elevation: 419 m (1,375 ft)
- Lowest elevation: 215 m (705 ft)
- Population (2023): 2,729
  - Density: 204.9/km^{2} (530.6/sq mi)
- Time zone: UTC+01:00 (CET)
  - Summer (DST): UTC+02:00 (CEST)
- INSEE/Postal code: 54111 /54230
- ^{1} French Land Register data, which excludes lakes, ponds, glaciers > 1 km^{2} (0.386 sq mi or 247 acres) and river estuaries.

Chaligny (French pronunciation: [ʃaliɲi]) is a commune in the Meurthe-et-Moselle department in north-eastern France.

== Population ==
Historical population
Year	Pop.	±% p.a.
1968	2,864	—
1975	3,242	+1.79%
1982	3,077	−0.74%
1990	2,929	−0.61%
1999	2,955	+0.10%
2007	3,071	+0.48%
2012	2,983	−0.58%
2017	2,858	−0.85%
2023	2,729	−0.77%
Source: INSEE

== See also ==
- Communes of the Meurthe-et-Moselle department
