= 559th Volksgrenadier Division =

559th Volksgrenadier Division 559th Grenadier Division
- 559. Volksgrenadier-Division; 559. Grenadier-Division
- Active: 1944–1945
- Country: Germany
- Branch: German Army
- Type: Infantry (volksgrenadier)
- Size: Division
- Part of: 1st Army; 19th Army
- Engagements: World War II; Siegfried Line campaign; Operation Nordwind; Western Allied invasion of Germany

Commanders
- Notable commanders: Kurt von Mühlen

The 559th Volksgrenadier Division (German: 559. Volksgrenadier-Division) was a volksgrenadier division of the German Army during World War II that fought entirely on the Western Front.

After being formed, it was sent to fight the Allied advance from Paris to the Rhine in northeastern France, near Metz. The 559th later defended a section of the West Wall fortifications near Saarbrücken before fighting in the Saar–Palatinate region of southwest Germany. It was nearly destroyed in along the Rhine, and its remaining members surrendered in May 1945 in Württemberg.

== Background ==
After the Wehrmacht took heavy casualties among infantry divisions in the summer of 1944, they started organizing volksgrenadier ("people's grenadier") divisions, which were new infantry divisions with less manpower and equipment, along with a new title to raise morale. Adolf Hitler came up with the name, with volk appealing to German nationalism and grenadier referring to German military traditions. These had fewer soldiers and less heavy equipment than normal infantry divisions, but more automatic weapons (such as the Sturmgewehr 44) and anti-tank weapons (Panzerfaust and Panzerschreck). They also had a shortage of motorized vehicles, relying primarily on horses and to a lesser extent on bicycles. The volksgrenadier formations were put together with young and old conscripts, security troops, former personnel of the Luftwaffe and Kriegsmarine, and, in some cases, they were combined with surviving members of infantry divisions that had been destroyed. The latter received the numbers of the infantry divisions they were combined with, as Hitler wanted to preserve their history, while those that were completely new were generally given a number in the 500 series. Heinrich Himmler and the SS were responsible for overseeing the training of these units, though they remained part of the Wehrmacht.

== History ==
It was established at the Baumholder training camp as the 559th Grenadier Division in the mobilization wave of July 1944, being a replacement infantry division for those that were lost on the Eastern Front. On 9 October 1944 its designation was changed to 559th Volksgrenadier Division, and it had a strength of 8,500 troops. The division was originally assigned to go to the Eastern Front, and was staffed with officers that had combat experience. However, before it could get much training, in the first days of September the division was sent to the west, where it was assembled along with the 3rd and 15th Panzergrenadier divisions and the 553rd Volksgrenadier Division, before reinforcing the German positions in northeastern France.

The division was deployed to assist the 1st Army in the Moselle river area, where the 1st Army and 5th Panzer Army tried to stop the Allied advance from Paris to the Rhine near Metz. It defended Thionville in early September against units of the U.S. 90th Infantry Division. When George Patton's U.S. Third Army paused its advance, the Germans launched a counterattack, with the 559th Grenadier Division and the 106th Panzer Brigade advancing on American positions near Moncel-sur-Seille on 24 September 1944, being held by the Third Army's XII Corps. Although the attack had been preceded by an artillery bombardment, as the division had a full artillery regiment, the U.S. artillery responded with counter-battery fire, and they also received air support from P-47 Thunderbolts strafing the Germans. After several hours of fighting the counterattack by the 559th and 106th had failed, but they did succeed in closing a gap in the German line between the 1st Army and the 5th Panzer Army. On 27 September, the 559th launched another attack, in the forest near Grémecey, and made some progress before American reinforcements from the 6th Armored Division arrived. The XII Corps forced them to withdraw from the area around the end of the month.

The division remained near Chateau-Salins after retreating and was ordered to hold the line there as of early November 1944. American troops broke through its positions and pushed it back, taking Chateau-Salins on 9 November. Even after taking significant losses, the 559th was still considered a capable formation by the German command. In the middle of the month, the remnants of the German 48th Infantry Division were combined with the 559th, which together became a kampfgruppe (battle group). The volksgrenadier division was then moved to Saarlautern near the West Wall, and managed to hold its positions when the U.S. XX Corps began its initial attack starting on 28 November. The 559th took heavy losses in fierce house-to-house fighting while defending Saarlautern from the U.S. 95th Infantry Division, which reached the city center on 3 December. In early January 1945, the division participated in Operation Nordwind, the southern portion of the German offensive that became the Battle of the Bulge. It attempted to capture Lemberg but was stopped by the 100th Infantry Division.

It continued to fight in the battles near the West Wall from January to March 1945, and remained in a salient past the Wall near Saarbrücken at the start of March. American forces spent the first two months of 1945 preparing for an offensive into the Saar–Palatinate, across the Moselle river, to establish bridgeheads along the Rhine at the southern end of the Allied front. Paul Hausser, the commander of Army Group G in the Saar region, requested that the 559th be withdrawn from the West Wall to reinforce the section of the Moselle river from Koblenz to Cochem, which Hitler granted. In mid-March the first units from the division arrived in the Moselle sector, though too late to make a difference in the fighting there.

After the Americans established a bridgehead on the Moselle river and advanced into Saarland, the Germans withdrew to the eastern side of the Rhine. The 559th Volksgrenadier Division was near Mannheim, and was the largest division left in the portion of the Rhine between Mannheim and Wiesbaden. The U.S. 3rd Infantry Division crossed the Rhine in the area near the 559th Volksgrenadier on 26 March 1945. They were initially met with mortar and anti-aircraft artillery fire from the Germans as they prepared to cross to the eastern bank of the river, but American counter-battery fire was effective and the 3rd Infantry was able to cross. They continued facing resistance in the villages and countryside from German troops, engaging in house-to-house fighting. Nonetheless, the 3rd Infantry were able to push the 559th out of the area and secured a bridgehead for the U.S. Seventh Army to cross the Rhine. The division was nearly destroyed in the battle and what was left of it surrendered to the U.S. in Münsingen, Württemberg, in May 1945.

== Commanders ==
The division was commanded by Kurt von Mühlen for its entire existence.

== Structure ==
The division consisted of the following.

- 1125th Grenadier Regiment
- 1126th Grenadier Regiment
- 1127th Grenadier Regiment
- 1559th Artillery Regiment
- 1559th Fusilier Company
- 1559th Tank Destroyer Battalion
- 1559th Engineer Battalion
- 1559th Signal Battalion
- 1559th Divisional Supply Troops
- 805th Anti-Aircraft Battalion

== Bibliography ==
- Cole, Hugh M. (1984) [1950]. The Lorraine Campaign. Washington, D.C.: Center of Military History. LCCN 50-60957.
- Guardia, Mike (2022). Arracourt 1944: Triumph of American Armor. Casemate Publishers. ISBN 978-1-63624-033-6.
- MacDonald, Charles B. (1993) [1973]. The Last Offensive. Washington, D.C.: Center of Military History. LCCN 71-183070.
- Mansoor, Peter R. (1999). The GI Offensive in Europe: The Triumph of American Infantry Divisions, 1941-1945. Lawrence: University Press of Kansas. ISBN 978-0-7006-1226-0.
- Mitcham, Samuel W. (2007). German Order of Battle: 291st–999th Infantry Divisions, Named Infantry Divisions, and Special Divisions in WWII. Vol. 2. Mechanicsburg: Stackpole Books. ISBN 978-0-8117-3437-0.
- Mitcham, Samuel W. (2009). The Siegfried Line: The German Defense of the West Wall, September-December 1944. Mechanicsburg: Stackpole Books. ISBN 978-1-4617-5163-2.
- Nash, Douglas E. (2015). Victory Was Beyond Their Grasp: With the 272nd Volks-Grenadier Division from the Huertgen Forest to the Heart of the Reich. Haverton: Casemate Publishers. ISBN 978-1-61200-305-4.
- Ripley, Tim (2003). The Wehrmacht: The German Army in World War II, 1939–1945. New York: Taylor & Francis. ISBN 978-1-57958-312-5.
- Sylvan, William C.; Smith, Francis G. (2008). John T. Greenwood (ed.). Normandy to Victory: The War Diary of General Courtney H. Hodges and the First U.S. Army. Lexington: University Press of Kentucky. ISBN 978-0-8131-2642-5.
- Yeide, Harry (2014). Fighting Patton: George S. Patton Jr. Through the Eyes of His Enemies. Zenith Press. ISBN 978-0-7603-4592-4.
