= Pont-Saint-Vincent =

- Commune
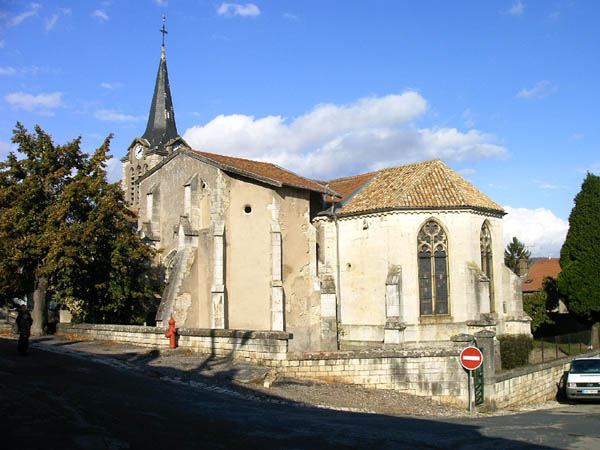
- The church in Pont-Saint-Vincent

- Coat of arms
- Location of Pont-Saint-Vincent
- Location within France Location within Grand Est
- Coordinates: 48°36′21″N 6°05′53″E
- Country: France
- Region: Grand Est
- Department: Meurthe-et-Moselle
- Arrondissement: Nancy
- Canton: Neuves-Maisons
- Intercommunality: CC Moselle et Madon

Government
  - Mayor (2020–2026): Yannick Hellak
- Area^{1}: 6.66 km^{2} (2.57 sq mi)
- Elevation: 222 m (728 ft)
- Highest elevation: 412 m (1,352 ft)
- Lowest elevation: 216 m (709 ft)
- Population (2023): 1,775
  - Density: 267/km^{2} (690/sq mi)
- Time zone: UTC+01:00 (CET)
  - Summer (DST): UTC+02:00 (CEST)
- INSEE/Postal code: 54432 /54550
- ^{1} French Land Register data, which excludes lakes, ponds, glaciers > 1 km^{2} (0.386 sq mi or 247 acres) and river estuaries.

Pont-Saint-Vincent (French pronunciation: [pɔ̃ sɛ̃ vɛ̃sɑ̃]) is a commune in the Canton of Neuves-Maisons in the Meurthe-et-Moselle department in Grand Est, north-eastern France, on the banks of the Moselle. It is neighbored by the commune Neuves-Maisons on the other side of the Moselle.

== Geography ==
The river Madon flows into the Moselle in the commune.

== See also ==
- Communes of the Meurthe-et-Moselle department
