= Johannes Bruhn =

German general

- Born: 10 July 1898
- Died: 20 November 1954 (aged 56)
- Military career
- Allegiance: Nazi Germany; West Germany
- Branch: Army (Wehrmacht); Bundesgrenzschutz
- Rank: Generalmajor
- Commands: 553th Volksgrenadier Division
- Conflicts: World War II
- Awards: Knight's Cross of the Iron Cross

Johannes Bruhn (10 July 1898 – 20 November 1954) was a German general in the Wehrmacht during World War II. He was a recipient of the Knight's Cross of the Iron Cross. In 1951 he joined the Bundesgrenzschutz (Federal Border Guards), retiring in 1954.

== Awards and decorations ==
- German Cross in Gold on 17 November 1941 as Oberstleutnant in Artillerie-Regimentsstab z.b.V. 818
- Knight's Cross of the Iron Cross on 20 December 1943 as Oberst and commander of Artilleriekommandeur 149
- Commander's Cross of the Federal Cross of Merit 1954

Military offices
Preceded by Oberst Erich Löhr	Commander of 553th Volksgrenadier Division; 23 September 1944 - 22 November 1944	Succeeded by Generalmajor Gerhard Hüther
