= Méréville, Meurthe-et-Moselle =

Méréville
- Commune
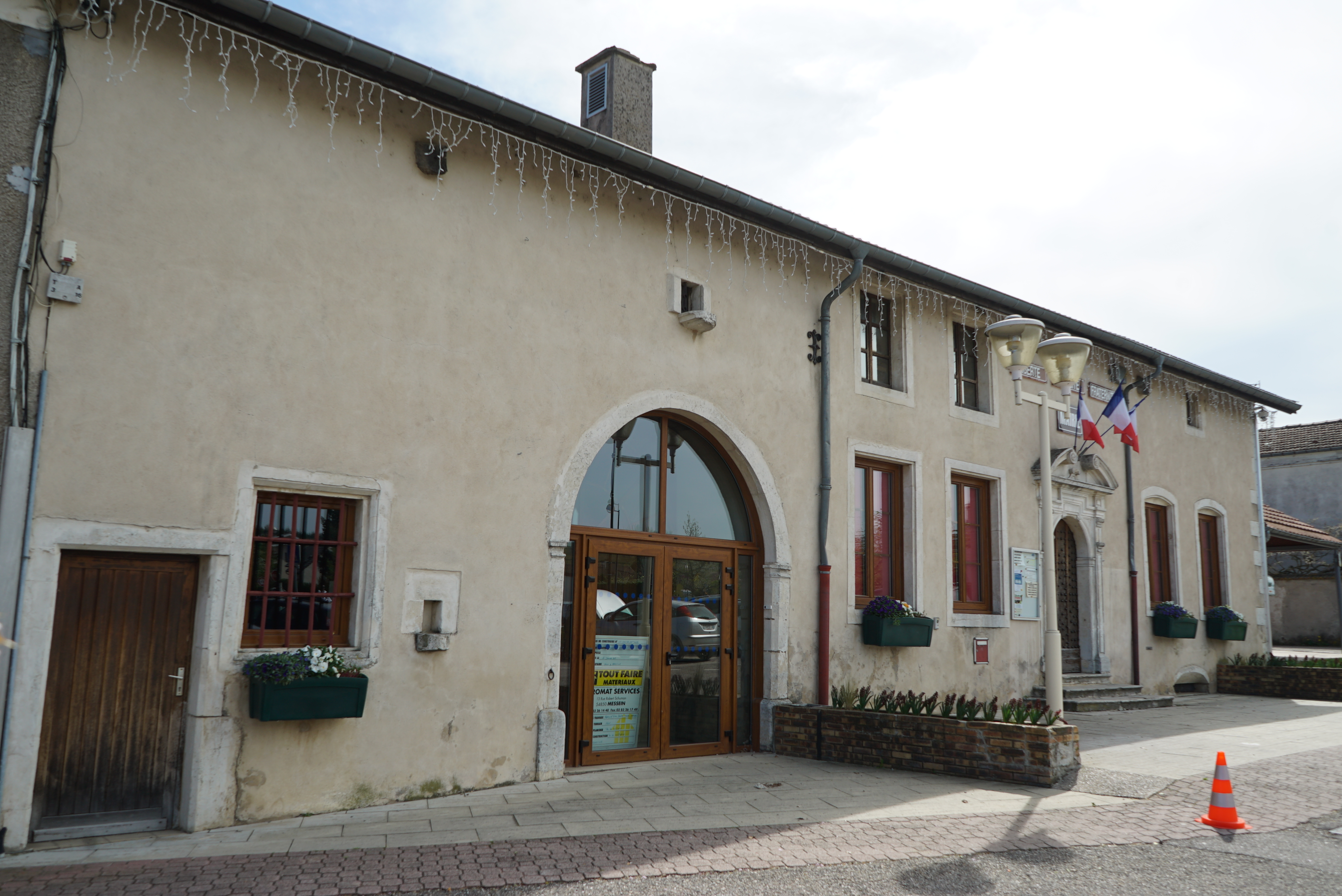
- The town hall in Méréville

- Coat of arms
- Location of Méréville
- Location within France Location within Grand Est
- Coordinates: 48°35′34″N 6°09′11″E
- Country: France
- Region: Grand Est
- Department: Meurthe-et-Moselle
- Arrondissement: Nancy
- Canton: Neuves-Maisons
- Intercommunality: Moselle et Madon

Government
  - Mayor (2020–2026): Cédric Schwaederle
- Area^{1}: 8.43 km^{2} (3.25 sq mi)
- Elevation: 240 m (790 ft)
- Highest elevation: 343 m (1,125 ft)
- Lowest elevation: 218 m (715 ft)
- Population (2023): 1,288
  - Density: 153/km^{2} (396/sq mi)
- Time zone: UTC+01:00 (CET)
  - Summer (DST): UTC+02:00 (CEST)
- INSEE/Postal code: 54364 /54850
- ^{1} French Land Register data, which excludes lakes, ponds, glaciers > 1 km^{2} (0.386 sq mi or 247 acres) and river estuaries.

Méréville (French pronunciation: [meʁevil]) is a commune in the Meurthe-et-Moselle department in north-eastern France.

== Geography ==
The river Madon flows through the commune.

== See also ==
- Communes of the Meurthe-et-Moselle department
