= Heribert Mühlen =

German Roman-Catholic theologian

Heribert Mühlen (April 27, 1927 – May 25, 2006) was a German Roman-Catholic theologian.

He was born in Mönchengladbach, studied in Bonn, Freiburg, Rome, Innsbruck, Münster und Munich, and was priest since 1955. Since 1962 Mühlen taught at the Divinity Faculty of the University Paderborn, where he later (1964–1997) worked as Ordinarius für Dogmatik und Dogmengeschichte (Professor of Dogmatics and Dogmatical History). During the Second Vatican Council, Pope Paul VI appointed Mühlen as one of the theological experts (1964).

His theological work is concentrated mostly on pneumatology, ecclesiology and pastoral theology. Mühlen also helped to promote charismatic ideas into the Roman Catholic Church.

== Works ==
- Kirche wächst von innen: Weg zu einer glaubensgeschichtlichen neuen Gestalt der Kirche. Neubestimmung des Verhältnisses von Kirche und Gesellschaft. Bonifatius, Paderborn 1996
- Una Mystica Persona. (1967)
- "A Charismatic Theology - Initiation in the Spirit" (in English published by Burns and Oates, 1978: in German published by Matthias-Grunewald Verlag of Mainz 1975-76)
