= Maizières, Meurthe-et-Moselle =

Maizières
- Commune
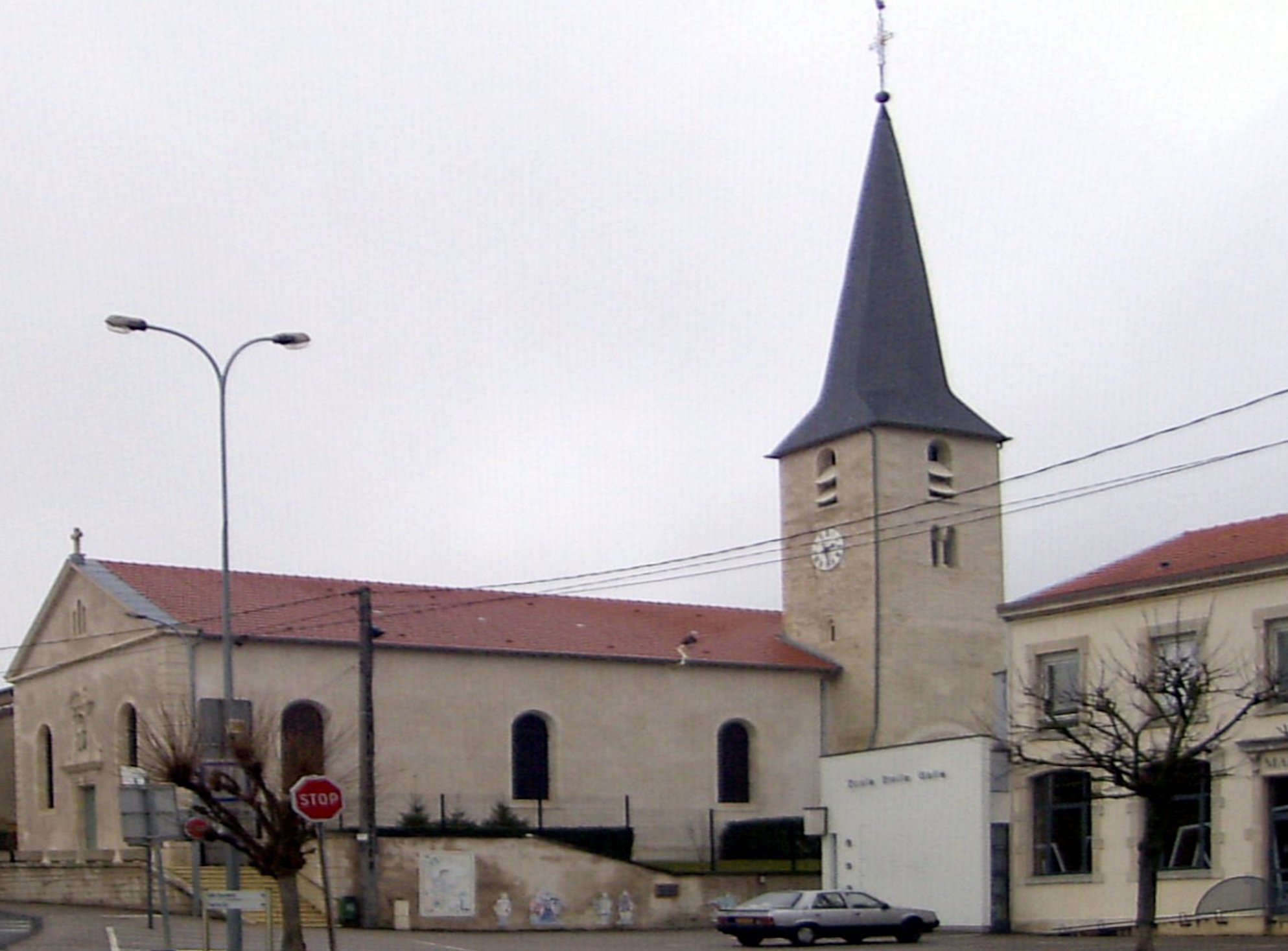
- The church in Maizières

- Coat of arms
- Location of Maizières
- Location within France Location within Grand Est
- Coordinates: 48°35′06″N 6°03′45″E
- Country: France
- Region: Grand Est
- Department: Meurthe-et-Moselle
- Arrondissement: Nancy
- Canton: Neuves-Maisons
- Intercommunality: CC Moselle et Madon

Government
  - Mayor (2020–2026): Jean Lopes
- Area^{1}: 15.63 km^{2} (6.03 sq mi)
- Elevation: 246 m (807 ft)
- Highest elevation: 397 m (1,302 ft)
- Lowest elevation: 229 m (751 ft)
- Population (2023): 932
  - Density: 59.6/km^{2} (154/sq mi)
- Time zone: UTC+01:00 (CET)
  - Summer (DST): UTC+02:00 (CEST)
- INSEE/Postal code: 54336 /54550
- ^{1} French Land Register data, which excludes lakes, ponds, glaciers > 1 km^{2} (0.386 sq mi or 247 acres) and river estuaries.

Maizières (French pronunciation: [mɛzjɛʁ]) is a commune in the Meurthe-et-Moselle department in north-eastern France.

== See also ==
- Communes of the Meurthe-et-Moselle department
