= Bainville-sur-Madon =

- Commune
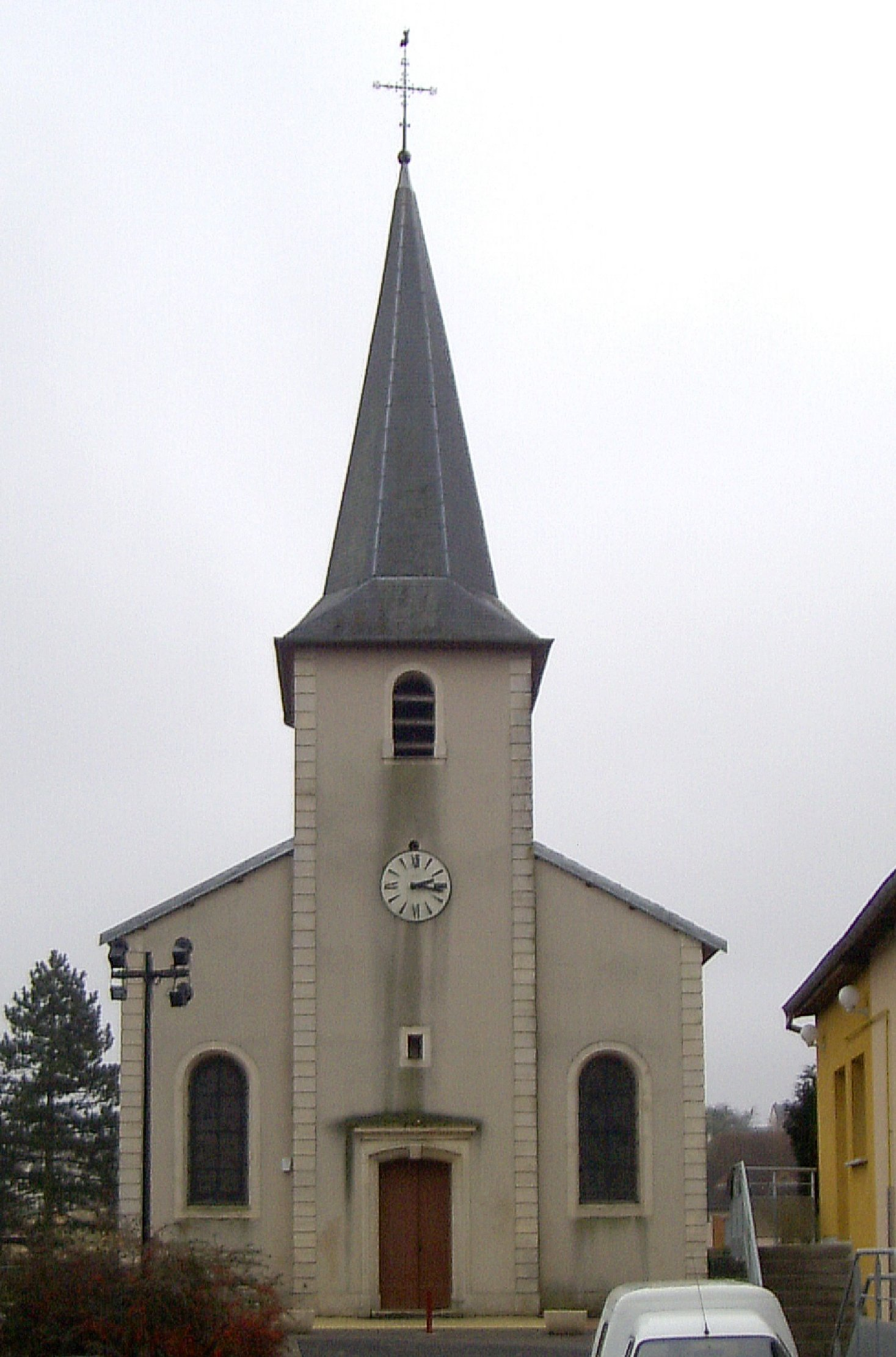
- The church in Bainville-sur-Madon

- Coat of arms
- Location of Bainville-sur-Madon
- Location within France Location within Grand Est
- Coordinates: 48°35′16″N 6°05′42″E
- Country: France
- Region: Grand Est
- Department: Meurthe-et-Moselle
- Arrondissement: Nancy
- Canton: Neuves-Maisons
- Intercommunality: Moselle et Madon

Government
  - Mayor (2020–2026): Benoit Sklepek
- Area^{1}: 5.88 km^{2} (2.27 sq mi)
- Elevation: 223 m (732 ft)
- Highest elevation: 415 m (1,362 ft)
- Lowest elevation: 220 m (720 ft)
- Population (2023): 1,441
  - Density: 245/km^{2} (635/sq mi)
- Time zone: UTC+01:00 (CET)
  - Summer (DST): UTC+02:00 (CEST)
- INSEE/Postal code: 54043 /54550
- ^{1} French Land Register data, which excludes lakes, ponds, glaciers > 1 km^{2} (0.386 sq mi or 247 acres) and river estuaries.

Bainville-sur-Madon (French pronunciation: [bɛ̃vil syʁ madɔ̃], literally Bainville on Madon) is a commune in the Meurthe-et-Moselle department in northeastern France.

== Geography ==
The Madon forms most of the commune's eastern border.

== Population ==
Historical population
Year	Pop.	±% p.a.
1968	677	—
1975	747	+1.42%
1982	906	+2.80%
1990	1,051	+1.87%
1999	1,170	+1.20%
2007	1,423	+2.48%
2012	1,378	−0.64%
2017	1,396	+0.26%
2023	1,441	+0.53%
Source: INSEE

== See also ==
- Communes of the Meurthe-et-Moselle department
