= Flavigny-sur-Moselle =

- Commune
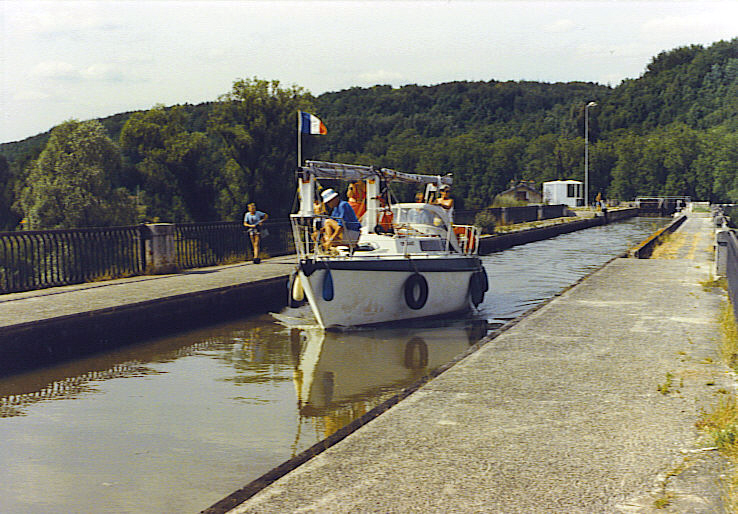
- The canal aqueduct in Flavigny-sur-Moselle

- Coat of arms
- Location of Flavigny-sur-Moselle
- Location within France Location within Grand Est
- Coordinates: 48°34′11″N 6°11′19″E
- Country: France
- Region: Grand Est
- Department: Meurthe-et-Moselle
- Arrondissement: Nancy
- Canton: Neuves-Maisons
- Intercommunality: Moselle et Madon

Government
  - Mayor (2020–2026): Marcel Tedesco
- Area^{1}: 17.3 km^{2} (6.7 sq mi)
- Elevation: 230 m (750 ft)
- Highest elevation: 359 m (1,178 ft)
- Lowest elevation: 222 m (728 ft)
- Population (2023): 1,661
  - Density: 96.0/km^{2} (249/sq mi)
- Time zone: UTC+01:00 (CET)
  - Summer (DST): UTC+02:00 (CEST)
- INSEE/Postal code: 54196 /54630
- ^{1} French Land Register data, which excludes lakes, ponds, glaciers > 1 km^{2} (0.386 sq mi or 247 acres) and river estuaries.

Flavigny-sur-Moselle (French pronunciation: [flaviɲi syʁ mɔzɛl]) is a commune in the Meurthe-et-Moselle department in north-eastern France. On the night of 10–11 September 1944, the bridge across the river Moselle and the adjacent canal near the commune were the site of a fierce battle between American soldiers of the 134th Infantry Regiment, 35th Infantry Division, and German soldiers of the 15th Panzergrenadier Division.

== See also ==
- Communes of the Meurthe-et-Moselle department
