= Chavigny, Meurthe-et-Moselle =

Chavigny
- Commune
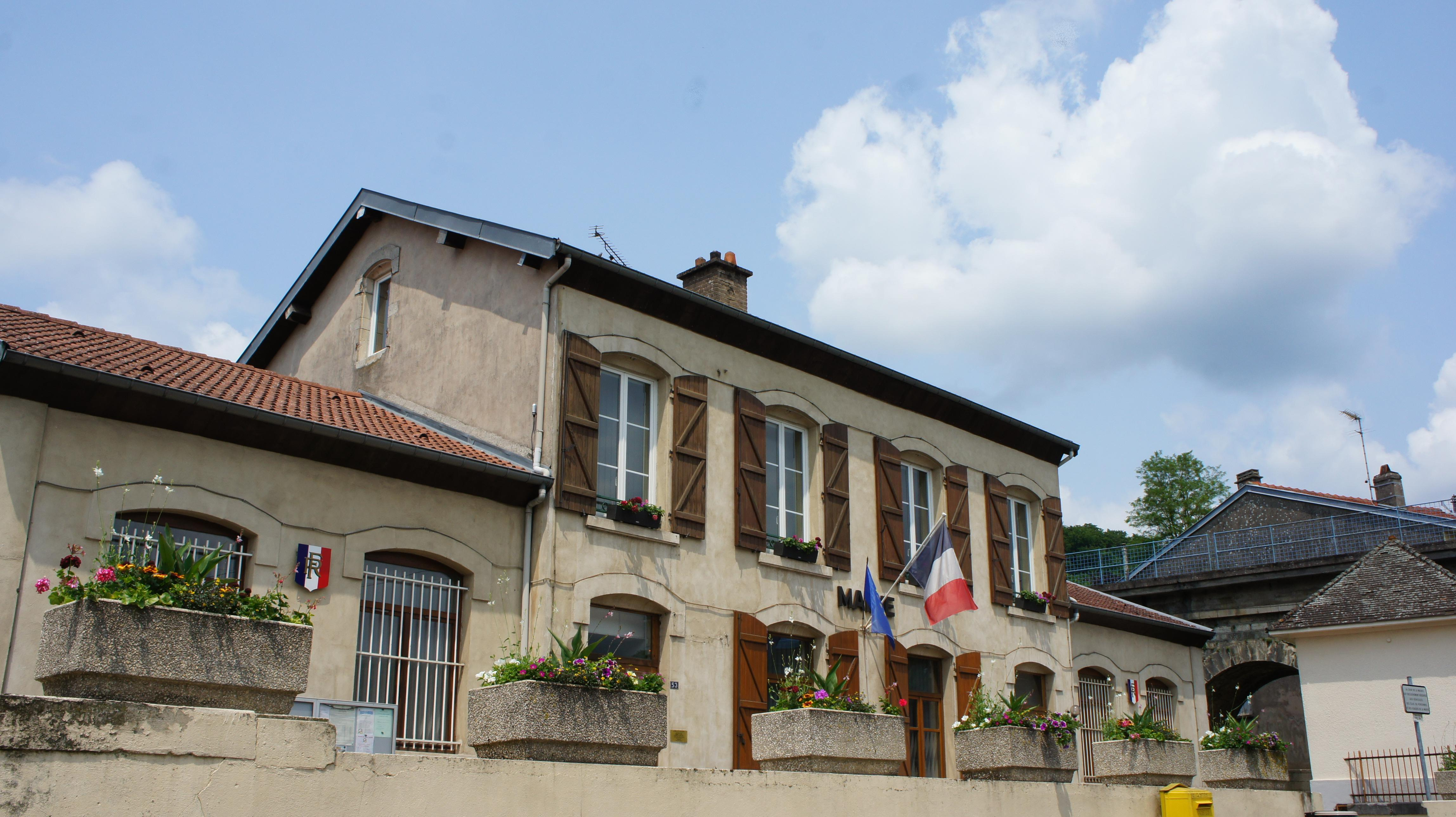
- The town hall in Chavigny

- Coat of arms
- Location of Chavigny
- Location within France Location within Grand Est
- Coordinates: 48°37′48″N 6°07′30″E
- Country: France
- Region: Grand Est
- Department: Meurthe-et-Moselle
- Arrondissement: Nancy
- Canton: Neuves-Maisons
- Intercommunality: Moselle et Madon

Government
  - Mayor (2020–2026): Hervé Tillard
- Area^{1}: 6.69 km^{2} (2.58 sq mi)
- Elevation: 264 m (866 ft)
- Highest elevation: 418 m (1,371 ft)
- Lowest elevation: 248 m (814 ft)
- Population (2023): 1,686
  - Density: 252/km^{2} (653/sq mi)
- Time zone: UTC+01:00 (CET)
  - Summer (DST): UTC+02:00 (CEST)
- INSEE/Postal code: 54123 /54230
- ^{1} French Land Register data, which excludes lakes, ponds, glaciers > 1 km^{2} (0.386 sq mi or 247 acres) and river estuaries.

Chavigny (French pronunciation: [ʃaviɲi]) is a commune in the Meurthe-et-Moselle department in north-eastern France.

== See also ==
- Communes of the Meurthe-et-Moselle department
