= Kurt von Mühlen =

German general (1905–1971)

- Born: 22 January 1905
- Died: 15 January 1971 (aged 65)
- Military career
- Allegiance: Weimar Republic (to 1933); Nazi Germany
- Branch: Army (Wehrmacht)
- Service years: 1923-1945
- Rank: Generalleutnant
- Commands: 559th Volksgrenadier Division
- Conflicts: World War II
- Awards: Knight's Cross of the Iron Cross with Oak Leaves

Kurt von Mühlen (22 January 1905 – 15 January 1971) was a German military officer with the rank of Generalleutnant (lieutenant general), who began his service under the Weimar Republic and later served under Nazi Germany. During World War II, he commanded the 559th Volksgrenadier Division. He was a recipient of the Knight's Cross of the Iron Cross with Oak Leaves of Nazi Germany.

== Awards and decorations ==
- Iron Cross (1939) 2nd Class (18 May 1940) & 1st Class (31 July 1940)
- German Cross in Gold on 28 February 1942 as Major in MG-Battalion 5
- Knight's Cross of the Iron Cross with Oak Leaves
  - Knight's Cross on 6 November 1942 as Oberstleutnant and commander of Jäger-Regiment 75
  - Oak Leaves on 9 January 1945 as Generalmajor and commander of 559.Volks-Grenadier-Division
