= Jean-Aimé de Chavigny =

Astrologer and alchemist

Jean-Aimé de Chavigny (1524?–1604) was a French astrologer and an alchemist. He was a disciple of Nostradamus. De Chavigny recorded the life of Nostradamus and considered himself to be Nostradamus's successor as prophet and astrologer. When Henry IV was to become King of France, de Chavigny reinterpreted many of Nostradamus’s writings to apply to Henry IV, although these prophecies did not come true.
