= Bainville-aux-Miroirs =

- Commune
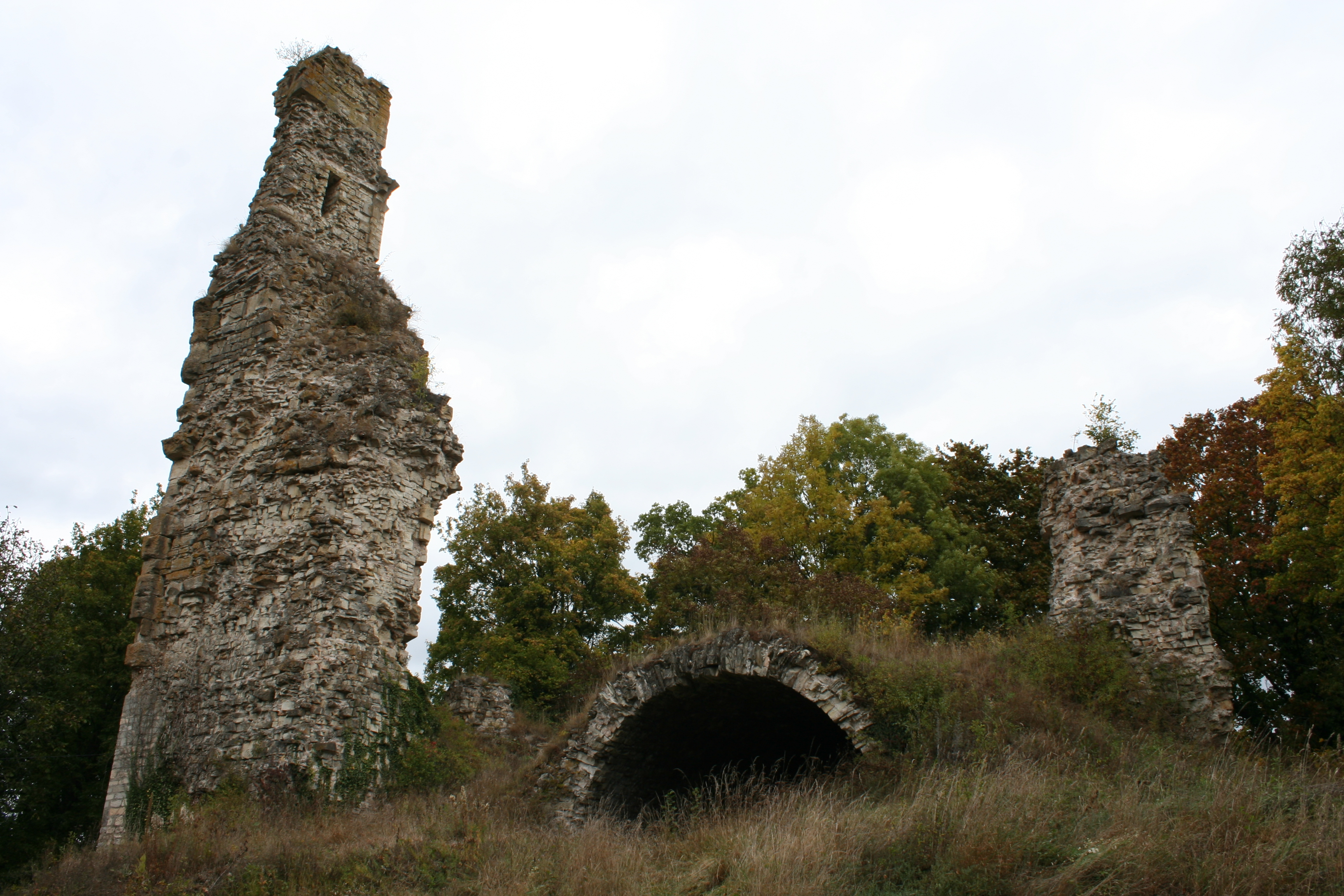
- The remains of the chateau in Bainville-aux-Miroirs

- Coat of arms
- Location of Bainville-aux-Miroirs
- Location within France Location within Grand Est
- Coordinates: 48°26′20″N 6°16′39″E
- Country: France
- Region: Grand Est
- Department: Meurthe-et-Moselle
- Arrondissement: Nancy
- Canton: Meine au Saintois

Government
  - Mayor (2020–2026): Brigitte Meyer
- Area^{1}: 6.76 km^{2} (2.61 sq mi)
- Elevation: 287 m (942 ft)
- Highest elevation: 366 m (1,201 ft)
- Lowest elevation: 250 m (820 ft)
- Population (2023): 304
  - Density: 45.0/km^{2} (116/sq mi)
- Time zone: UTC+01:00 (CET)
  - Summer (DST): UTC+02:00 (CEST)
- INSEE/Postal code: 54042 /54290
- ^{1} French Land Register data, which excludes lakes, ponds, glaciers > 1 km^{2} (0.386 sq mi or 247 acres) and river estuaries.

Bainville-aux-Miroirs is a commune in the Meurthe-et-Moselle department in northeastern France.

== Population ==
Historical population
Year	Pop.	±% p.a.
1968	263	—
1975	276	+0.69%
1982	277	+0.05%
1990	298	+0.92%
1999	316	+0.65%
2007	339	+0.88%
2012	338	−0.06%
2017	305	−2.03%
2023	304	−0.05%
Source: INSEE

== See also ==
- Communes of the Meurthe-et-Moselle department
