= Canton of Dieulouard =

Former canton in Meurthe-et-Moselle, France

Coordinates: 48°49′57″N 6°00′56″E

- Former canton
- Location of the canton in the arrondissement of Nancy
- Country: France
- Region: Grand Est
- Department: Meurthe-et-Moselle
- No. of communes: {{{nbcomm}}}
- Disbanded: 2015

Government
  - Representatives: Yvon Biston
- Area: 121.21 km^{2} (46.80 sq mi)
- Population (2012): 19,508
  - Density: 160.94/km^{2} (416.84/sq mi)

The canton of Dieulouard (French: Canton de Dieulouard) is a former French canton located in the department of Meurthe-et-Moselle in the Lorraine region (now part of Grand Est). This canton was organized around Dieulouard in the arrondissement of Nancy. It is now part of the canton of Entre Seille et Meurthe.

The last general councillor from this canton was Yvon Biston (PS), elected in 2008.

== Composition ==
The canton of Dieulouard grouped together 11 municipalities and had 19,556 inhabitants (2012 census without double counts).

1. Blénod-lès-Pont-à-Mousson
2. Dieulouard
3. Fey-en-Haye
4. Jezainville
5. Maidières
6. Montauville
7. Norroy-lès-Pont-à-Mousson
8. Pagny-sur-Moselle
9. Prény
10. Vandières
11. Villers-sous-Prény
