= CS Blénod =

Football club in France

- Full name: Club sportif de Blénod
- Founded: 1919
- Ground: Stade des Fonderies
- Capacity: 2,000
- Chairman: Raynald Crillon
- Manager: (France) Laurent Lewandowski
- League: Régional 3
Home colours

The Club sportif de Blénod, abbreviated to CS Blénod, is a French football club located in Blénod-lès-Pont-à-Mousson, in Meurthe-et-Moselle. It was founded in 1919 by Victor Claude, who was mayor of Blénod between 1947 and 1960. It is currently playing in the Régional 3.

== History ==
Founded in 1919, the club reached the highest regional level (Lorraine Football League) in 1947 and never again played at a lower level until 2014. In 1973, Blénod achieved promotion to the third division for the first time, and 10 years later, they also reached the second division, where they stayed for only one season, in 1982–83. The highlight of the club's history was reaching the round of 16 of the Coupe de France on two occasions, in 1986 and 1996, losing both of them to Olympique de Marseille.

At the end of the 2011–12 season, the club merged with CO Blénod to form CS Olympique de Blénod et Pont-à-Mousson. In 2019, the club celebrates its 100th anniversary.

== Honours ==
- Lorraine Football League:
  - Champions (2): 1973 and 2005
- Coupe de Lorraine:
  - Champions (2): 1973 and 1997
- Championnat National:
  - Runner-up (1): 1993–94
- Round of 16 of the Coupe de France: 1985–86 and 1995–96

== Managers ==
- (France) Joseph Birtel (1945–73)
- (France) Joseph Magiera (1973–80)
- (France) Hausknecht (1980–82)
- (France) Georges Dorget (1982–13)
- (France) Francis Vandamme (2013–16)
- (France) Cédric Gaugé (2016–20)
- (France) Brahim Boucherab (2020–22)
- (France) Julien Turnau (2022–present)

== Notable players ==
- (France) Roger Troisième
- (France) Janek Swiatek (1938–1942)
- (Poland) Édouard Kargulewicz (1946–1947)
- (France) Marcel Husson (1955–57)
- (France) René Woltrager (1964–67)
- (France) Joseph Magiera (1972–77)
- (France) Jean-Pierre François (1982–83)
- (France) Cédric Schille (1996–97)
- (Ivory Coast) Serge Djiehoua (2020–21)
