= Joseph Birtel =

French football manager

Personal information
- Place of birth: France

Managerial career
- Years: Team
- 1945–1973: Blénod
- 1976–1978: Metz training center

Joseph Birtel was a French football manager who oversaw Blénod for 28 years, from 1945 until 1973.

== Sporting career ==
In 1945, Birtel was appointed as the coach of Blénod, a position that he held for nearly three decades, until 1973, when he was replaced by Joseph Magiera. The highlight of this long stint was reaching the round of 16 of the 1953–54 Coupe de France, where Blénod, an amateur team in the DH, held OGC Nice, a professional top-flight team, to a goalless draw, despite playing most of the extra-time period with just nine men; the Blénod squad was welcomed as heroes upon their return to the Pont-à-Mousson train station, but they went on to lose the replay 6–3, the courtesy of Just Fontaine. It was during his leadership that Hubert Magnin joined the club in 1966, becoming one of its most dedicated members as well as its representative in the committee of the Lorraine Football League.

In 1976, Birtel was appointed as the second director of the FC Metz training center (replacing Georges Huart), a position that he held for two years, until 1978, when he retired, being replaced by Marcel Husson. During his time there, he oversaw the likes of Ettorre, Hinschberger, and Gaillot, among others. He then joined Céret FC, which was struggling due to being based in a town already mostly devoted to rugby union, but Birtel managed to structure the club and restore football's reputation within the city.

== See also ==
- List of longest managerial reigns in association football
