= Georges Dorget =

French footballer and manager

Personal information
- Date of birth: 22 August 1949 (age 77)
- Place of birth: Villers-sous-Prény, France
- Height: 1.76 m (5 ft 9 in)
- Position: Goalkeeper

Senior career*
Years	Team	Apps	(Gls)
1969–1975	Vittel		

Managerial career
- 1981–2013: Blénod
- * Club domestic league appearances and goals

Georges Dorget (born 22 August 1949), also known as Titi Dorget, was a French footballer and manager who oversaw Blénod for 32 years, from 1981 until 2013, which is one of the longest managerial reigns in football history.

== Career ==
Born in Villers-sous-Prény on 22 August 1949, Dorget began working at the Pont-à-Mousson factory, which he joined as an apprentice in 1963, aged 14. He only began to play football six years later, in 1969, playing as a goalkeeper for Vittel in the 1970s.

After his career as a player ended, he became a coach, taking over Blénod in 1981, a position that he held for 32 years, until being dismissed in May 2013. In only his second season there, in 1982, he promoted the 17-year-old Jean-Pierre François to the senior squad due to "his goal-scoring prowess and very mature personality". Under his leadership, the club won one Lorraine Football League (2005), one Coupe de Lorraine title (1997), finished as runner-ups of the 1993–94 third division, and also reached the round of 16 of the Coupe de France on two occasions, in 1986 and 1996, losing both of them to Olympique de Marseille. In the 2010–11 season, his 30th season at the helm of Blénod, the club achieved a respectable fifth place in the DH, and in the following year, the club had a good start, being second in the standings in November, as well as the only remaining undefeated team in the DH.

Just two years later, however, in May 2013, the club found itself in a locker room war between Titi's group and that of president Olivier Simon, which went as far as the club's stadium getting largely covered in graffiti hostile to Simon, who also received death threats, so he filed a complaint at the local police station and announced his resignation. Simon later called an extraordinary general meeting, where he entrusted the Dorget case to his vice-president, who sent a registered letter to Dorget informing him of his dismissal. Following the tumultuous end of his long relationship with Blénod, he only stated that "I haven't asked anything of anyone. I'm not in conflict with anyone, wishing to achieve the best possible results in the best possible spirit".

== Later life ==
In his later years, Dorget remained active, playing tennis and nature-related sports, such as hunting and fishing.

In October 2020, one of his grandsons, the 17-year-old Axel Dorget, followed Titi's footsteps by making his debut for Blénod as a goalkeeper.

== Honours ==
=== As a manager ===
- Lorraine Football League:
  - Champions (2): 1973 and 2005
- Coupe de Lorraine:
  - Champions (2): 1973 and 1997
- Championnat National:
  - Runner-up (1): 1993–94

== See also ==
- List of longest managerial reigns in association football
