= Magiera =

Magiera is a surname. Notable people with the name include:

- Christopher Magiera (born 1983), American opera singer
- Jacek Magiera (1977–2026), Polish football player and manager
- Jan Magiera (1938–2022), Polish cyclist
- Joseph Magiera (1939–2024), French footballer
- Katharina Magiera, German opera singer
- Mariusz Magiera (born 1984), Polish footballer
