= Vandières =

Vandières may refer to the following places in France:

- Vandières, Marne, a commune in the Marne department
- Vandières, Meurthe-et-Moselle, a commune in the Meurthe-et-Moselle department
