= Loisy =

Loisy may refer to:

Surname

- Alfred Loisy (1857-1940), French theologian

Places

- Loisy, Meurthe-et-Moselle, a commune in the French region of Lorraine
- Loisy, Saône-et-Loire, a commune in the French region of Bourgogne
- Loisy-en-Brie, a commune in the French region of Champagne-Ardenne
- Loisy-sur-Marne, a commune in the French region of Champagne-Ardenne
- Grivy-Loisy, a commune in the French region of Ardennes
