= Louvigny, Moselle =

Louvigny
- Commune
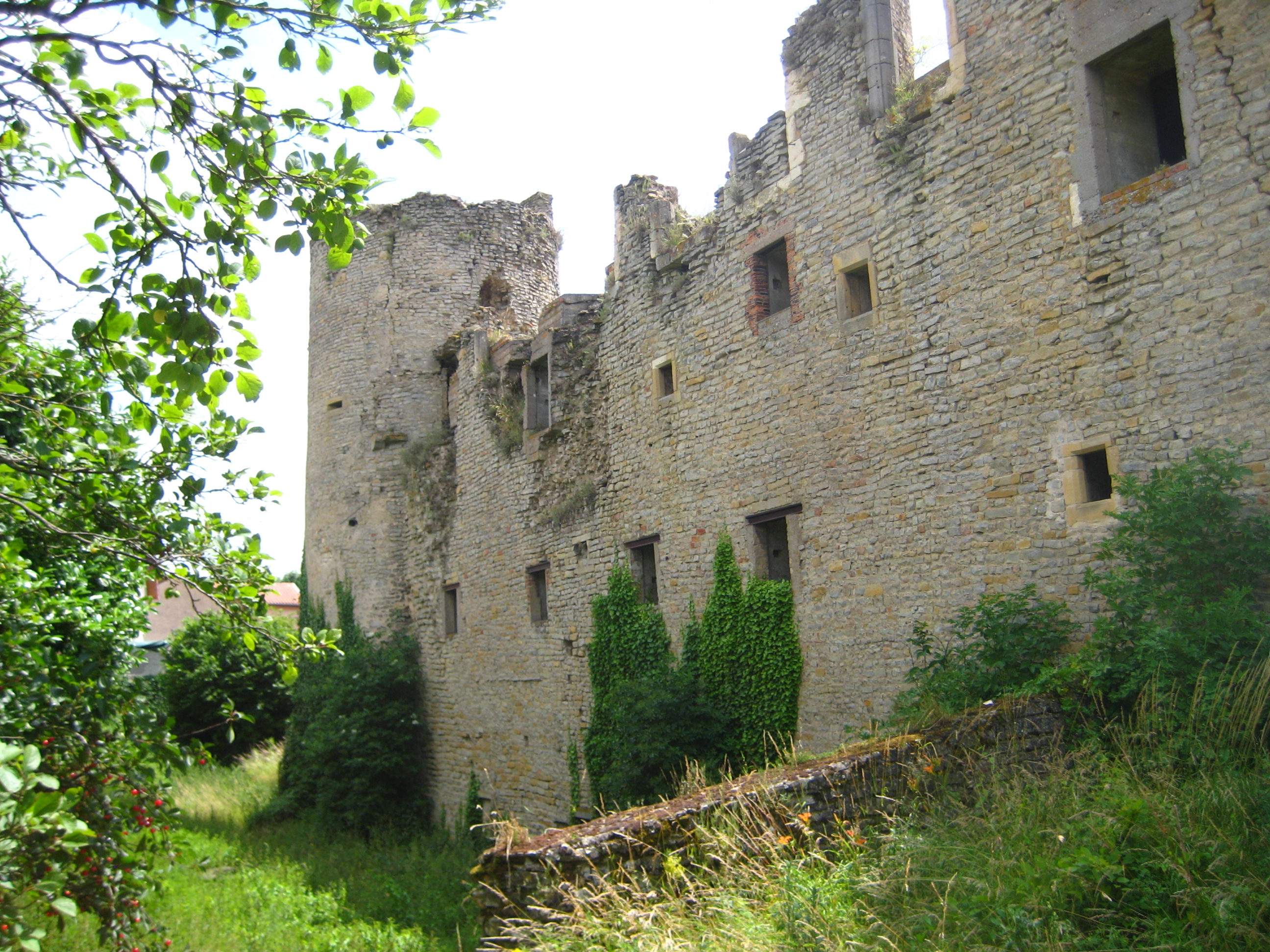
- The ruins of the chateau in Louvigny

- Coat of arms
- Location of Louvigny
- Location within France Location within Grand Est
- Coordinates: 48°57′45″N 6°11′06″E
- Country: France
- Region: Grand Est
- Department: Moselle
- Arrondissement: Metz
- Canton: Faulquemont
- Intercommunality: Sud Messin

Government
  - Mayor (2020–2026): Brigitte Torloting
- Area^{1}: 15.82 km^{2} (6.11 sq mi)
- Elevation: 200 m (660 ft)
- Highest elevation: 244 m (801 ft)
- Lowest elevation: 172 m (564 ft)
- Population (2023): 880
  - Density: 56/km^{2} (140/sq mi)
- Time zone: UTC+01:00 (CET)
  - Summer (DST): UTC+02:00 (CEST)
- INSEE/Postal code: 57422 /57420
- ^{1} French Land Register data, which excludes lakes, ponds, glaciers > 1 km^{2} (0.386 sq mi or 247 acres) and river estuaries.

Louvigny (French pronunciation: [luviɲi]; German: Loveningen) is a commune in the Moselle department in Grand Est in north-eastern France. It had a registered population of 890 in 2018.

Louvigny is the location of the Lorraine TGV station, which was opened in 2007, and is also close to the regional airport serving Metz and Nancy. The longer-term future of the Lorraine TGV station is the subject of a larger dispute between different tiers of local government. Another TGV station was proposed at Vandières, 10 km to the west, across the Moselle, at the connection point where the TGV line crosses the main line between Metz and Nancy. This project was abandoned in February 2015, following a regional referendum.

== See also ==
- Communes of the Moselle department
