= Vittonville =

- Commune
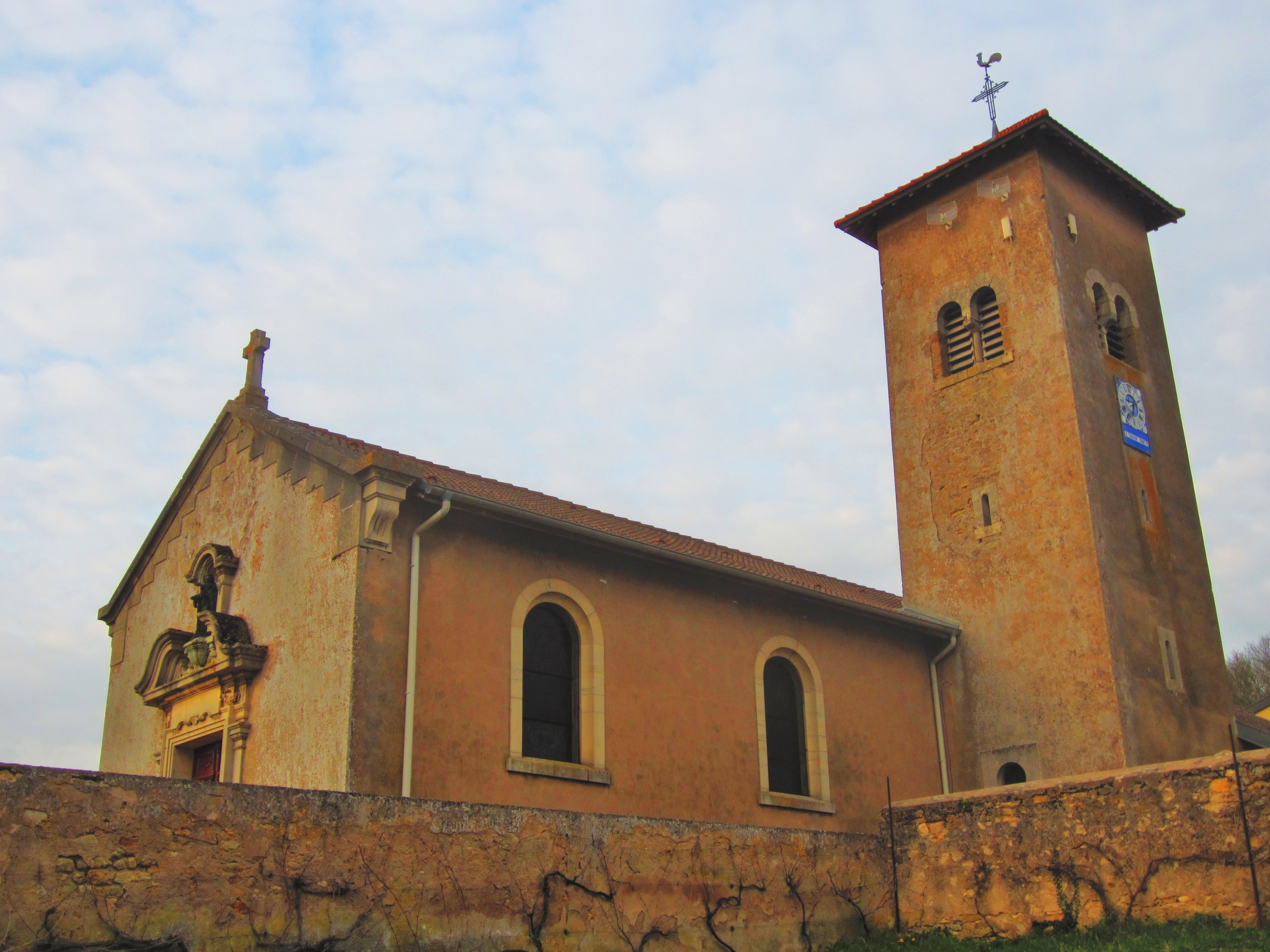
- The church in Vittonville

- Coat of arms
- Location of Vittonville
- Location within France Location within Grand Est
- Coordinates: 48°58′00″N 6°03′31″E
- Country: France
- Region: Grand Est
- Department: Meurthe-et-Moselle
- Arrondissement: Nancy
- Canton: Pont-à-Mousson
- Intercommunality: Bassin de Pont-à-Mousson

Government
  - Mayor (2020–2026): Thomas Girard
- Area^{1}: 4.03 km^{2} (1.56 sq mi)
- Elevation: 216 m (709 ft)
- Highest elevation: 398 m (1,306 ft)
- Lowest elevation: 172 m (564 ft)
- Population (2023): 126
  - Density: 31.3/km^{2} (81.0/sq mi)
- Time zone: UTC+01:00 (CET)
  - Summer (DST): UTC+02:00 (CEST)
- INSEE/Postal code: 54589 /54700
- ^{1} French Land Register data, which excludes lakes, ponds, glaciers > 1 km^{2} (0.386 sq mi or 247 acres) and river estuaries.

Vittonville (French pronunciation: [vitɔ̃vil]) is a commune in the Meurthe-et-Moselle department in north-eastern France.

== See also ==
- Communes of the Meurthe-et-Moselle department
