= John of Gorze =

Lorraine-born monk, diplomat, administrator and monastic reformer

Saint John of Gorze

Abbot
- Born: 900; Vandières, Meurthe-et-Moselle
- Died: 7 March 974
- Venerated in: Eastern Orthodox Church; Roman Catholic Church
- Feast: 27 February

Saint John of Gorze (French: Jean de Gorze, also called John of Lorraine) (c. 900 — 7 March 974) was a Lorraine-born monk, diplomat, administrator, and monastic reformer.

== Life ==
John of Gorze was born at Vandières near Pont-à-Mousson to parents who were wealthy and well known in the area. His father had married late in his life to a woman much younger than he. They had three children together. John's parents were able to provide for his education, and he studied at the Benedictine monastery of Saint-Mihiel in Metz. The tradition of scholarship was strong here; John's instructor was Hildebold, who had studied at Paris under Remi d'Auxerre.

At the age of twenty, he had already formed relationships with powerful figures of the region, including Count Ricuin of Verdun, and Dado, bishop of Verdun. He became a Benedictine monk at the Gorze Abbey in 933 after renouncing his wealth as an administrator of landed estates and making a pilgrimage to Rome and Monte Cassino.

== At the Abbey of Gorze ==
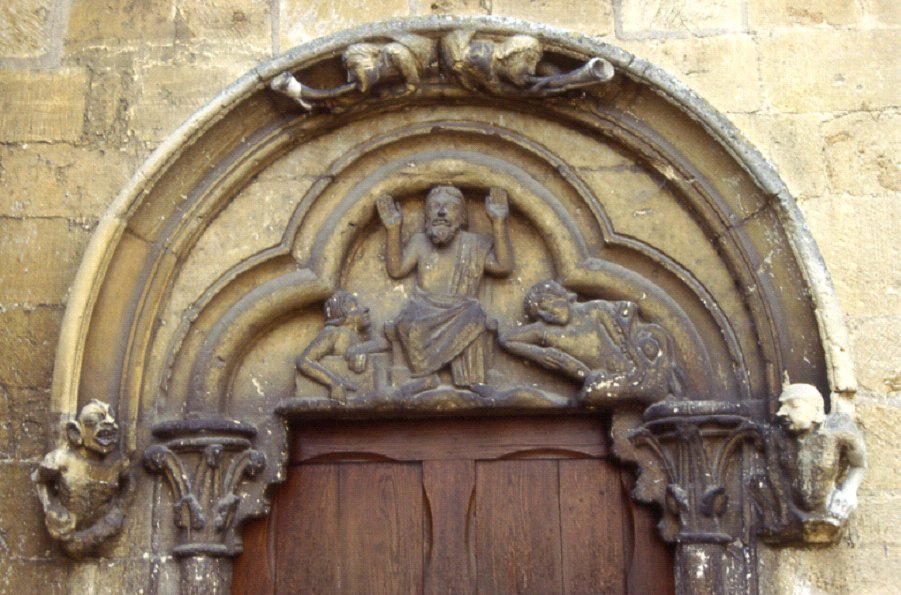
Tympanum of the Last Judgment, St. Stephen's Church, Gorze, once part of the abbey

Having found no monastery with a strict enough discipline, John had formed relationships with like-minded men, such as Einald, formerly archdeacon of Toul. In 933, Bishop Adelbero of Metz (929-962) had asked John and Einald to restore and reform the decayed monastery of Gorze. Einald became abbot and John became his principal assistant. The number of monks at Gorze increased, and the Gorze reform movement spread to other monasteries. In 950 Pope Agapetus II asked monks from Gorze to restore discipline in the monastery of St. Paul in Rome.

== Character ==
He is reputed to have had a photographic memory, and also developed a bookkeeping system and capital investment policies It was claimed that the murmur of his lips reading the Psalms resembled the buzzing of a bee.

== Mission to Al-Andalus ==
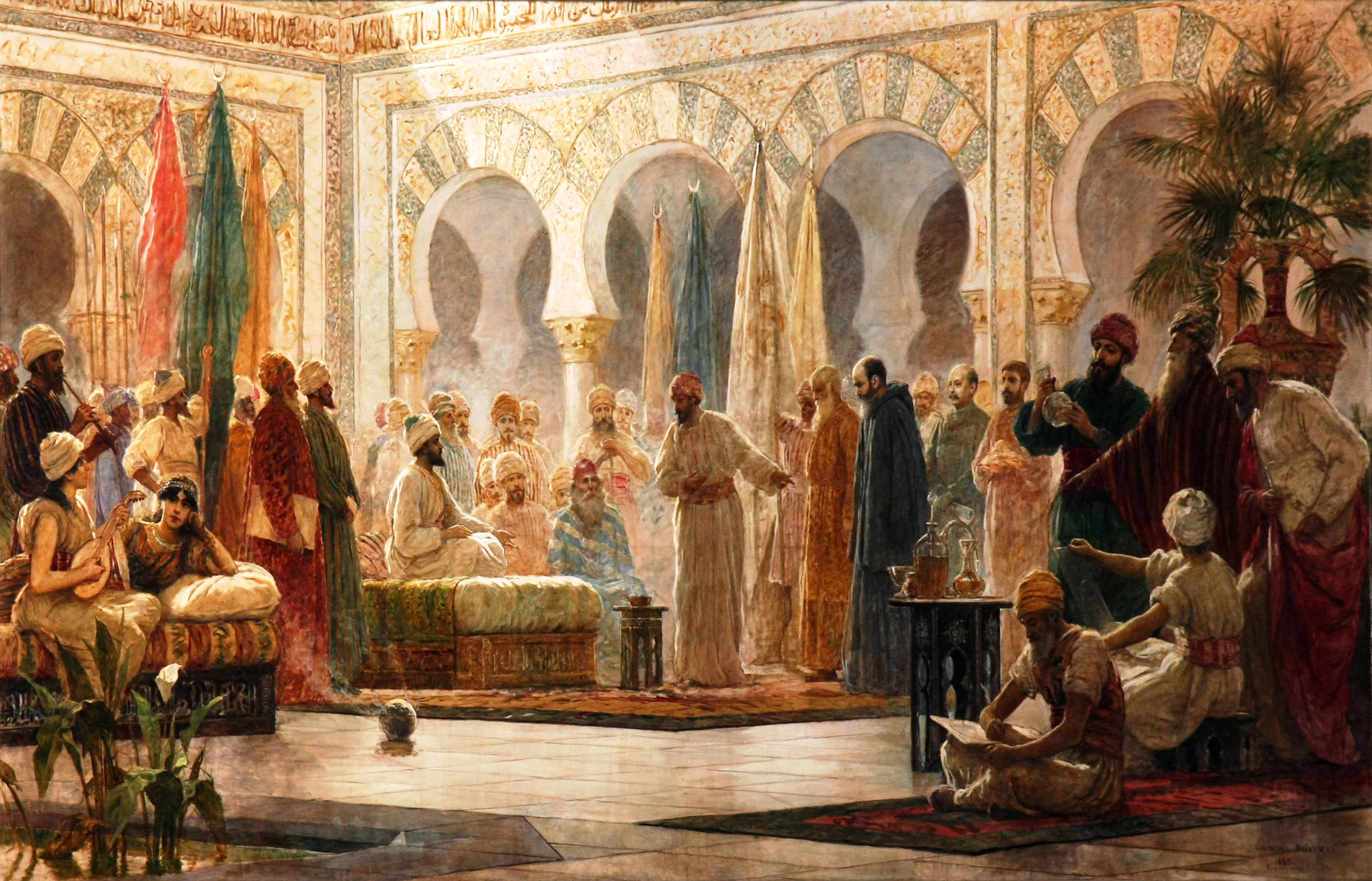
John and other Frankish diplomats before Caliph Abd-ar-Rahman III, by Dionisio Baixeras Verdaguer (1885).

In 953, he was sent as ambassador for King Otto I to the Caliph Abd-ar-Rahman III of Córdoba for three years. John had travelled by way of Langres, Dijon, Lyon, Avignon, and Barcelona. From Barcelona, he had proceeded to Tortosa, then Zaragoza, and finally Córdoba. The purpose of this mission was to stop the attacks made by Andalusian adventurers from their base at Fraxinet. John of Gorze arrived in 953-954 with his companions at Córdoba with a letter from Otto as well as valuable gifts. John lived in a palace close to the caliphal palace in Córdoba.

The caliph's ambassador, Hasdai ibn Shaprut, met with this embassy. The caliph, fearing that the letter of the German emperor might contain matter derogatory to Islam, commissioned Hasdai to open the negotiations with the envoys. Hasdai, who soon perceived that the letter could not be delivered to the caliph in its present form, persuaded the envoys to send for another letter which should contain no objectionable matter. John of Gorze said that he had "never seen a man of such subtle intellect as the Jew Hasdeu" An English translation of his account is published as ‘Niceties of diplomacy (953-56)', in Christians and Moors in Spain, trans. and ed. Colin Smith, Warminster, 1988, vol. I, pp. 62–75.

== Later life ==
He became abbot of Gorze Abbey in 960 upon the death of Einald of Toul. He died on 7 March 974 of natural causes.

His feast day is 27 February. John (Jean), abbot of St. Arnulph (Saint-Arnoul) at Metz, wrote a life of Gorze.

== Sources ==
- Jean, Abbot of Saint-Arnoul, La vie de Jean, abbé de Gorze. Présentée et traduite par Michel Parisse (Paris, Picard, 1999).
