= Bouxières-sous-Froidmont =

- Commune
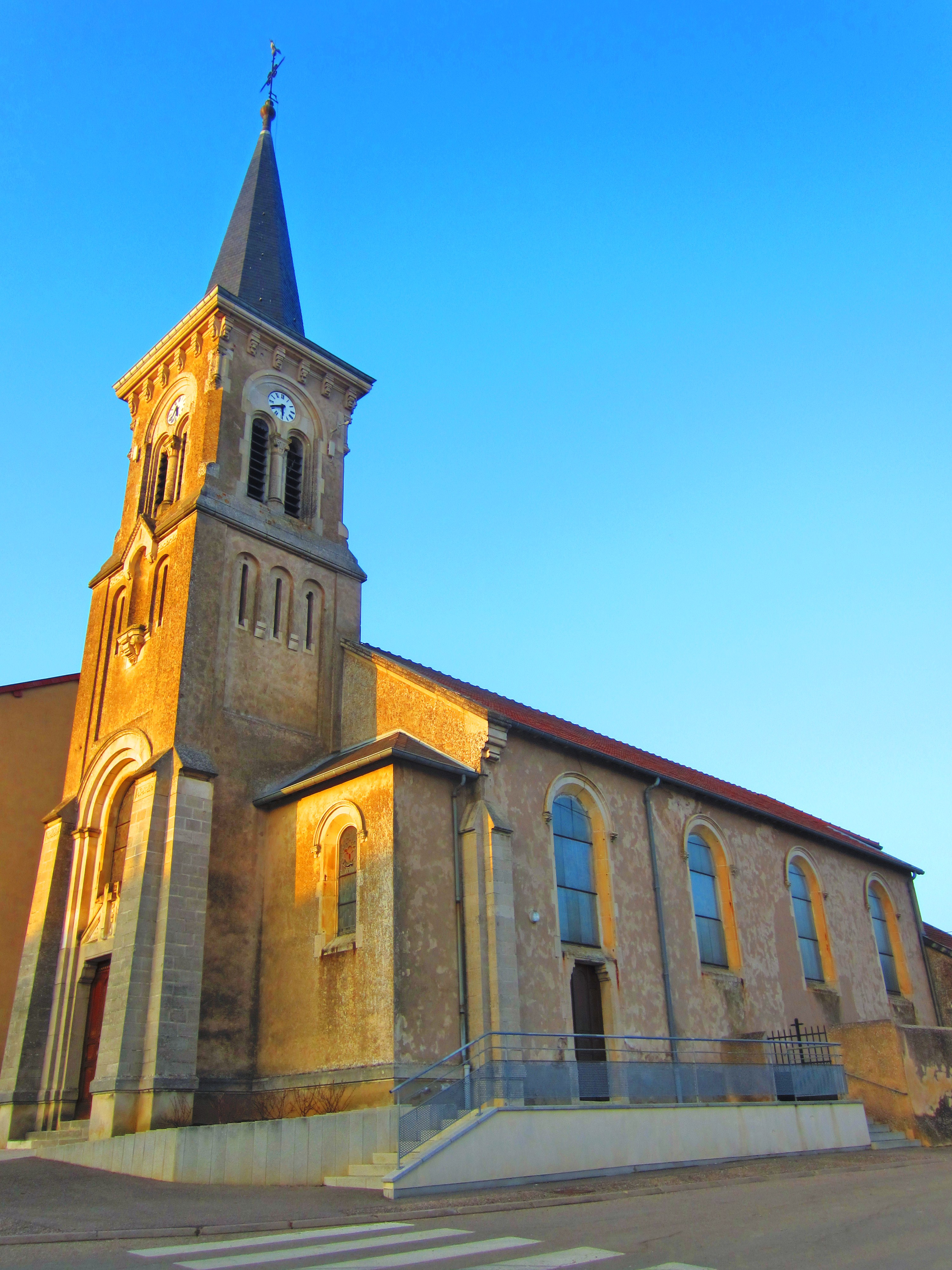
- The church in Bouxières-sous-Froidmont

- Coat of arms
- Location of Bouxières-sous-Froidmont
- Location within France Location within Grand Est
- Coordinates: 48°57′21″N 6°05′33″E
- Country: France
- Region: Grand Est
- Department: Meurthe-et-Moselle
- Arrondissement: Nancy
- Canton: Pont-à-Mousson

Government
  - Mayor (2020–2026): Robert Petit
- Area^{1}: 7.71 km^{2} (2.98 sq mi)
- Elevation: 386 m (1,266 ft)
- Highest elevation: 394 m (1,293 ft)
- Lowest elevation: 179 m (587 ft)
- Population (2023): 430
  - Density: 56/km^{2} (140/sq mi)
- Time zone: UTC+01:00 (CET)
  - Summer (DST): UTC+02:00 (CEST)
- INSEE/Postal code: 54091 /54700
- ^{1} French Land Register data, which excludes lakes, ponds, glaciers > 1 km^{2} (0.386 sq mi or 247 acres) and river estuaries.

Bouxières-sous-Froidmont is a commune in the Meurthe-et-Moselle department in northeastern France.

== Population ==
Historical population
Year	Pop.	±% p.a.
1968	198	—
1975	187	−0.81%
1982	200	+0.96%
1990	239	+2.25%
1999	266	+1.20%
2007	262	−0.19%
2012	301	+2.81%
2017	369	+4.16%
2023	430	+2.58%
Source: INSEE

== See also ==
- Communes of the Meurthe-et-Moselle department
