= Atton =

- Commune
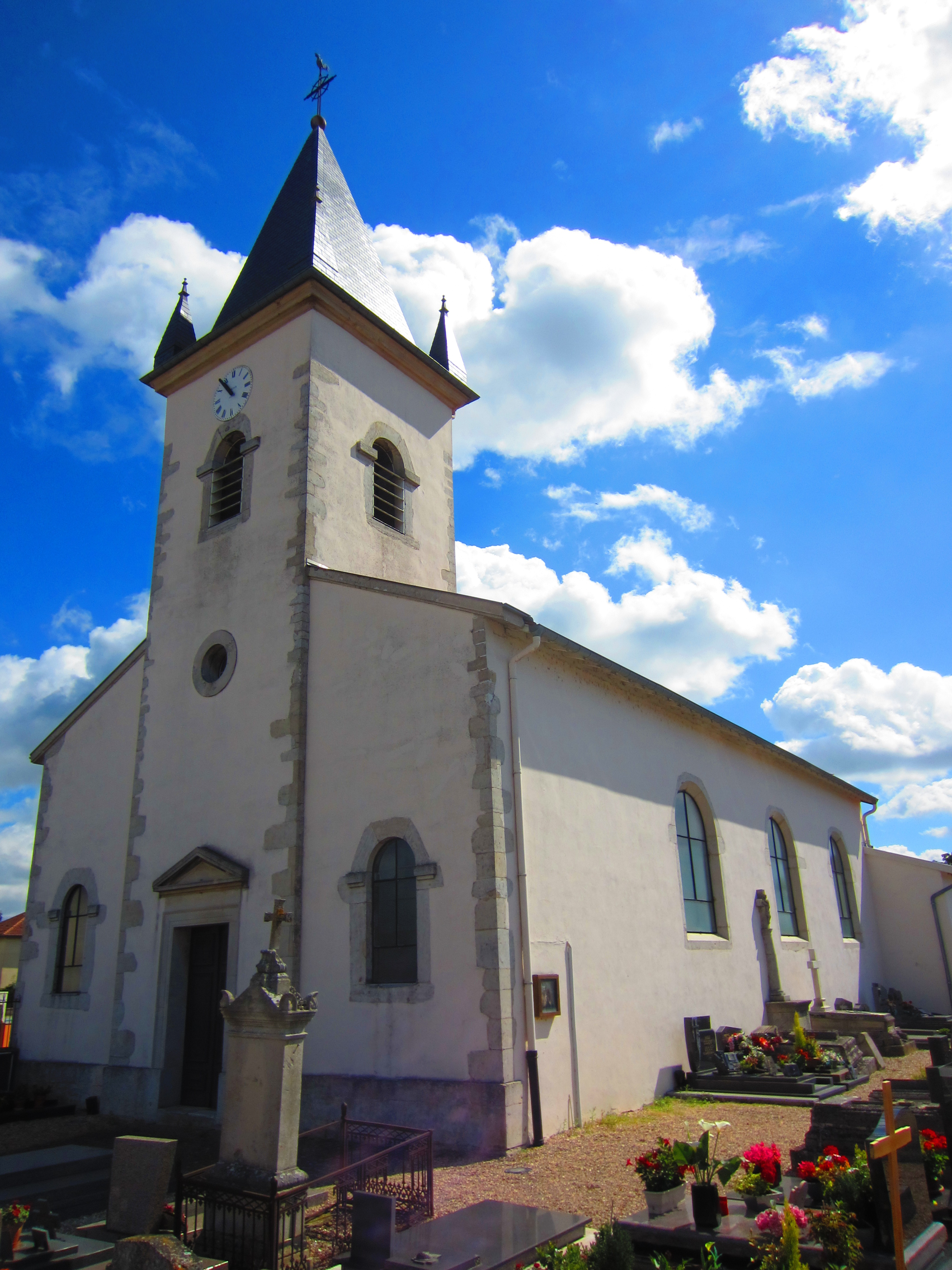
- The church in Atton

- Coat of arms
- Location of Atton
- Location within France Location within Grand Est
- Coordinates: 48°53′29″N 6°05′29″E
- Country: France
- Region: Grand Est
- Department: Meurthe-et-Moselle
- Arrondissement: Nancy
- Canton: Pont-à-Mousson
- Intercommunality: CC Bassin Pont-à-Mousson

Government
  - Mayor (2020–2026): Marléne Curina-Prillieux
- Area^{1}: 15.38 km^{2} (5.94 sq mi)
- Elevation: 202 m (663 ft)
- Highest elevation: 280 m (920 ft)
- Lowest elevation: 178 m (584 ft)
- Population (2023): 897
  - Density: 58.3/km^{2} (151/sq mi)
- Time zone: UTC+01:00 (CET)
  - Summer (DST): UTC+02:00 (CEST)
- INSEE/Postal code: 54027 /54700
- ^{1} French Land Register data, which excludes lakes, ponds, glaciers > 1 km^{2} (0.386 sq mi or 247 acres) and river estuaries.

Atton (French pronunciation: [atɔ̃]) is a commune in the Meurthe-et-Moselle department in northeastern France.

== Population ==
Historical population
Year	Pop.	±% p.a.
1968	523	—
1975	530	+0.19%
1982	522	−0.22%
1990	625	+2.28%
1999	637	+0.21%
2007	774	+2.46%
2012	789	+0.38%
2017	832	+1.07%
2023	897	+1.26%
Source: INSEE

== See also ==
- Communes of the Meurthe-et-Moselle department
