= Canton of Pont-à-Mousson =

Canton in Grand Est, France

Coordinates: 48.90°N 6.05°E

The canton of Pont-à-Mousson is an administrative division of the Meurthe-et-Moselle department, northeastern France. Its borders were modified at the French canton reorganisation which came into effect in March 2015. Its seat is in Pont-à-Mousson.

It consists of the following communes:

1. Arnaville
2. Atton
3. Bayonville-sur-Mad
4. Blénod-lès-Pont-à-Mousson
5. Bouxières-sous-Froidmont
6. Champey-sur-Moselle
7. Fey-en-Haye
8. Jezainville
9. Lesménils
10. Loisy
11. Maidières
12. Montauville
13. Mousson
14. Norroy-lès-Pont-à-Mousson
15. Onville
16. Pagny-sur-Moselle
17. Pont-à-Mousson
18. Prény
19. Vandelainville
20. Vandières
21. Villecey-sur-Mad
22. Villers-sous-Prény
23. Vittonville
24. Waville
