= Loisy, Meurthe-et-Moselle =

Loisy
- Commune
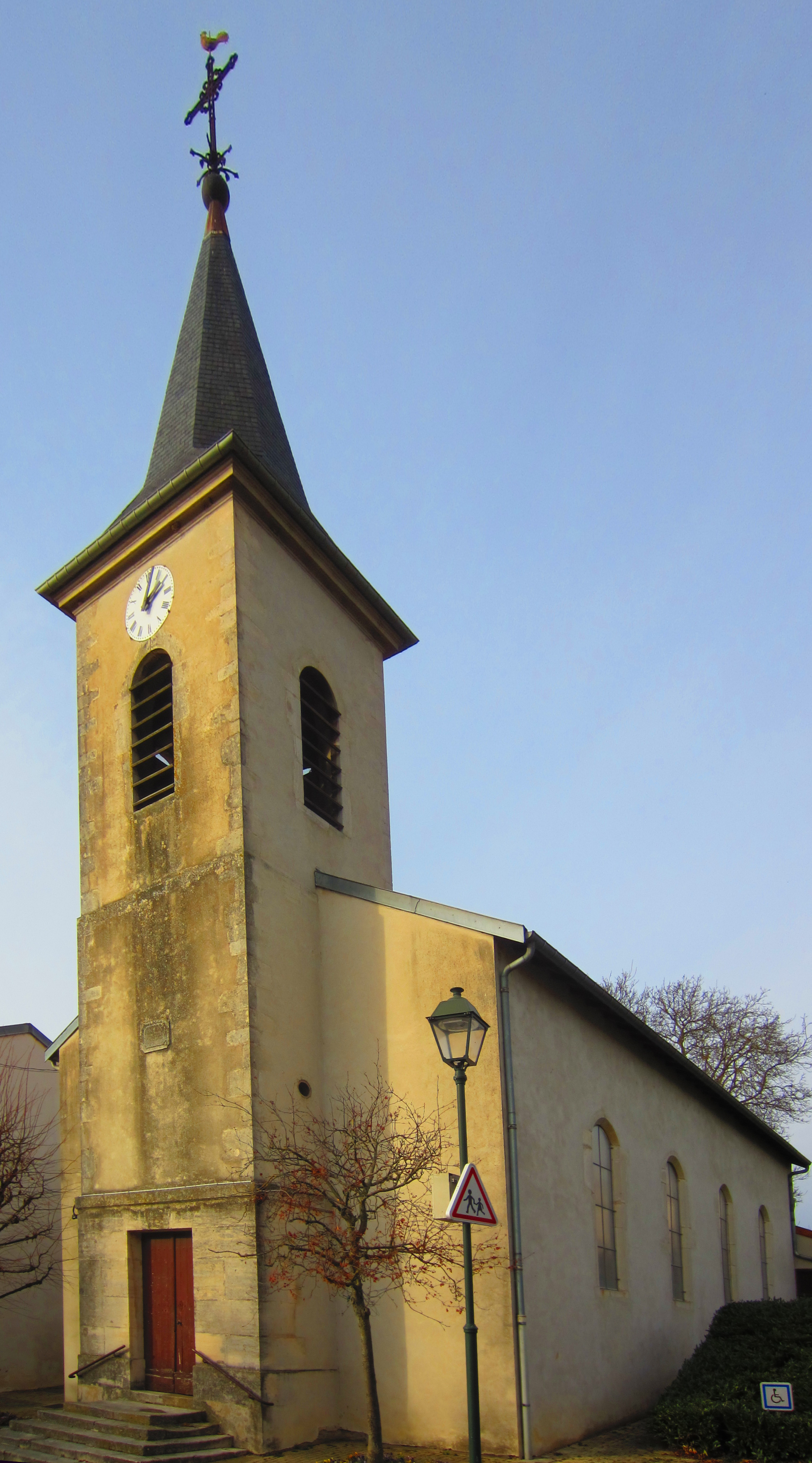
- The church in Loisy

- Coat of arms
- Location of Loisy
- Location within France Location within Grand Est
- Coordinates: 48°52′01″N 6°05′48″E
- Country: France
- Region: Grand Est
- Department: Meurthe-et-Moselle
- Arrondissement: Nancy
- Canton: Pont-à-Mousson
- Intercommunality: CC Bassin de Pont-à-Mousson

Government
  - Mayor (2020–2026): André Favre
- Area^{1}: 5.58 km^{2} (2.15 sq mi)
- Elevation: 186 m (610 ft)
- Highest elevation: 379 m (1,243 ft)
- Lowest elevation: 179 m (587 ft)
- Population (2023): 322
  - Density: 57.7/km^{2} (149/sq mi)
- Time zone: UTC+01:00 (CET)
  - Summer (DST): UTC+02:00 (CEST)
- INSEE/Postal code: 54320 /54700
- ^{1} French Land Register data, which excludes lakes, ponds, glaciers > 1 km^{2} (0.386 sq mi or 247 acres) and river estuaries.

Loisy (French pronunciation: [lwazi]) is a commune in the Meurthe-et-Moselle department in north-eastern France.

== See also ==
- Communes of the Meurthe-et-Moselle department
