= Jezainville =

- Commune
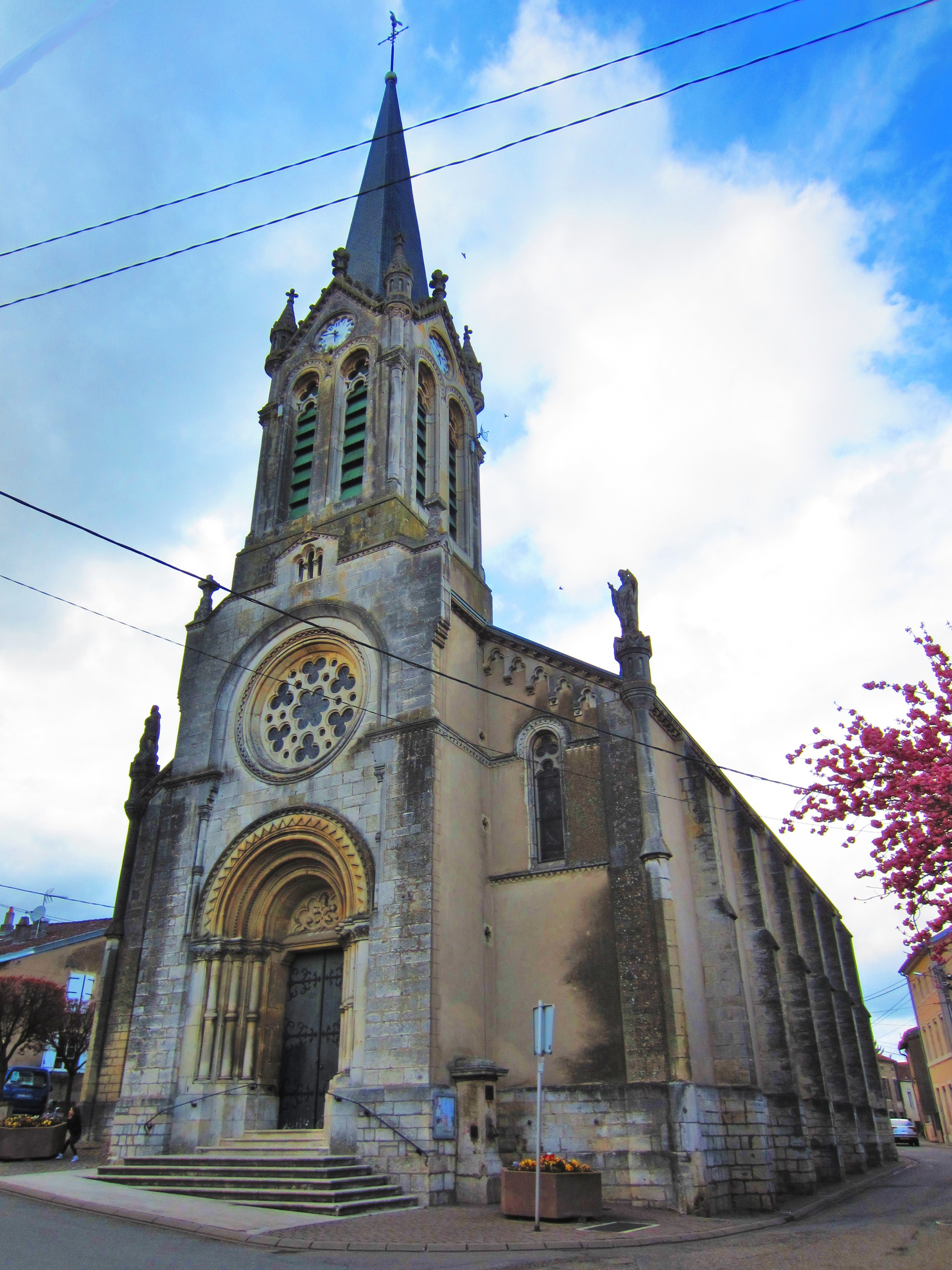
- The church in Jezainville

- Coat of arms
- Location of Jezainville
- Location within France Location within Grand Est
- Coordinates: 48°52′18″N 6°02′31″E
- Country: France
- Region: Grand Est
- Department: Meurthe-et-Moselle
- Arrondissement: Nancy
- Canton: Pont-à-Mousson
- Intercommunality: CC Bassin de Pont-à-Mousson

Government
  - Mayor (2020–2026): Marc Mouzin
- Area^{1}: 18.19 km^{2} (7.02 sq mi)
- Elevation: 190 m (620 ft)
- Highest elevation: 352 m (1,155 ft)
- Lowest elevation: 183 m (600 ft)
- Population (2023): 1,051
  - Density: 57.78/km^{2} (149.6/sq mi)
- Time zone: UTC+01:00 (CET)
  - Summer (DST): UTC+02:00 (CEST)
- INSEE/Postal code: 54279 /54700
- ^{1} French Land Register data, which excludes lakes, ponds, glaciers > 1 km^{2} (0.386 sq mi or 247 acres) and river estuaries.

Jezainville (French pronunciation: [ʒəzɛ̃vil]) is a commune in the Meurthe-et-Moselle department in north-eastern France.

== See also ==
- Communes of the Meurthe-et-Moselle department
- Parc naturel régional de Lorraine
