= Villers-sous-Prény =

- Commune
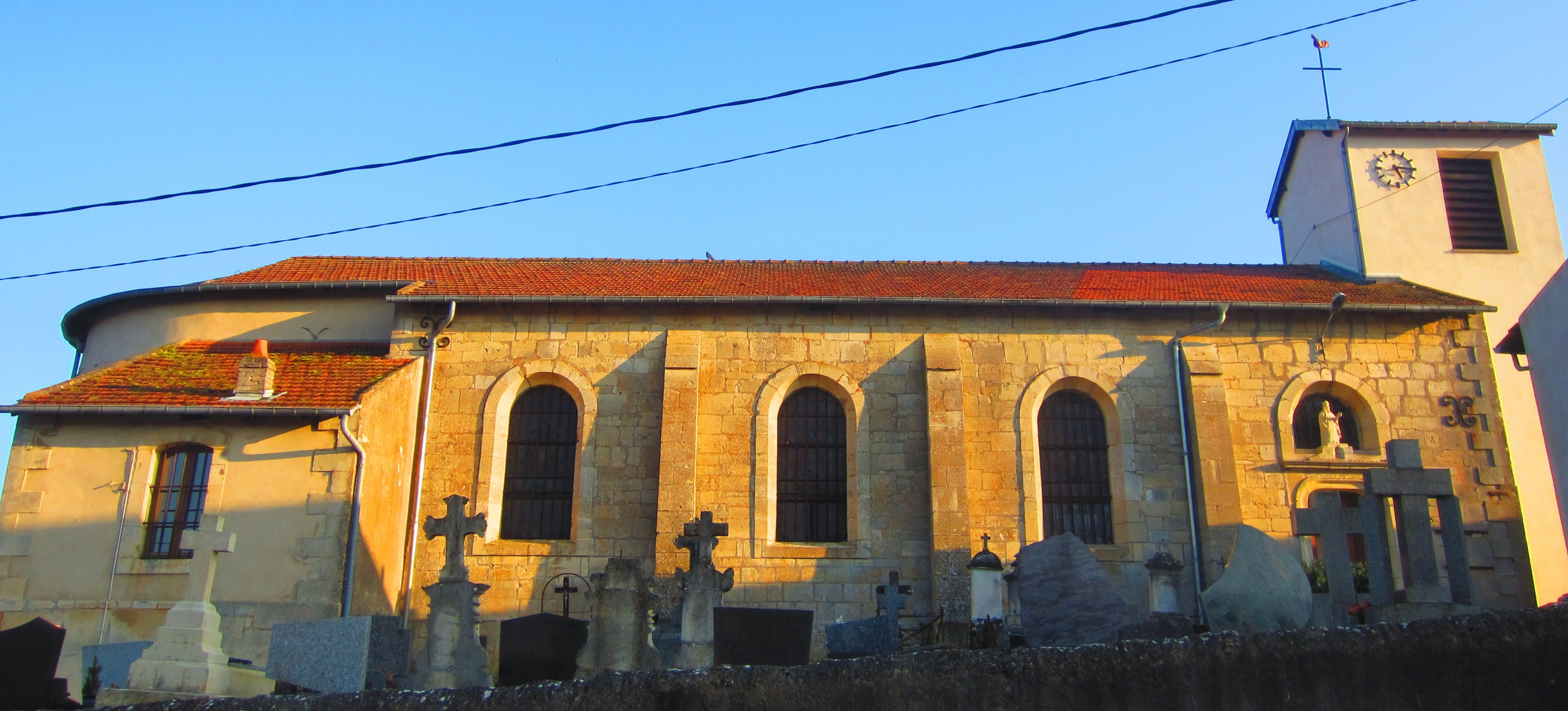
- The church in Villers-sous-Prény

- Coat of arms
- Location of Villers-sous-Prény
- Location within France Location within Grand Est
- Coordinates: 48°56′38″N 5°59′59″E
- Country: France
- Region: Grand Est
- Department: Meurthe-et-Moselle
- Arrondissement: Nancy
- Canton: Pont-à-Mousson

Government
  - Mayor (2020–2026): Jean-Yves Heresbach
- Area^{1}: 6.17 km^{2} (2.38 sq mi)
- Elevation: 200 m (660 ft)
- Highest elevation: 364 m (1,194 ft)
- Lowest elevation: 192 m (630 ft)
- Population (2023): 332
  - Density: 53.8/km^{2} (139/sq mi)
- Time zone: UTC+01:00 (CET)
  - Summer (DST): UTC+02:00 (CEST)
- INSEE/Postal code: 54579 /54700
- ^{1} French Land Register data, which excludes lakes, ponds, glaciers > 1 km^{2} (0.386 sq mi or 247 acres) and river estuaries.

Villers-sous-Prény (French pronunciation: [vilɛʁ su pʁeni], literally Villers under Prény) is a commune in the Meurthe-et-Moselle department in north-eastern France.

== See also ==
- Communes of the Meurthe-et-Moselle department
- Parc naturel régional de Lorraine
