= Montauville =

- Commune
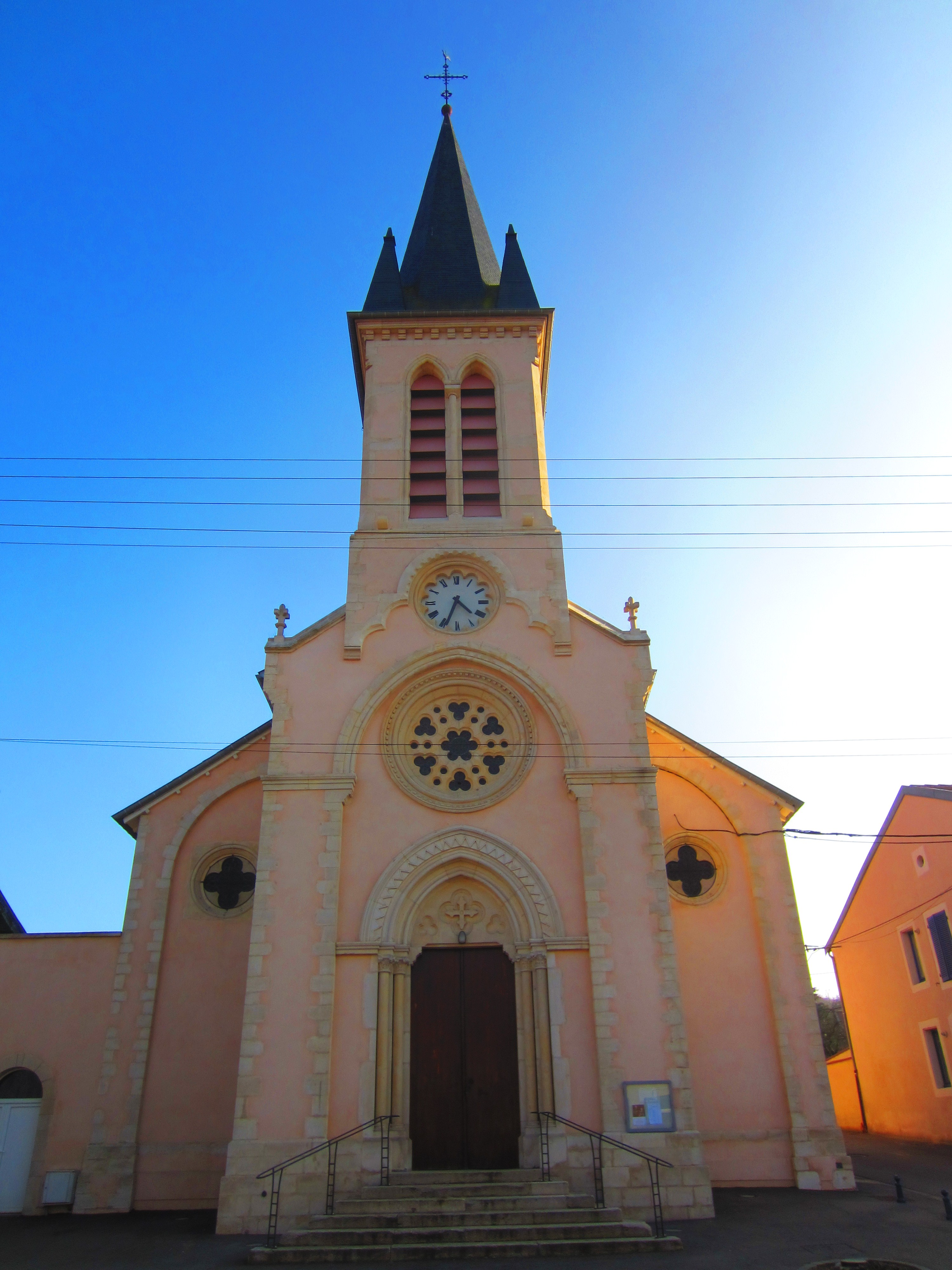
- The church in Montauville

- Coat of arms
- Location of Montauville
- Location within France Location within Grand Est
- Coordinates: 48°54′06″N 6°01′18″E
- Country: France
- Region: Grand Est
- Department: Meurthe-et-Moselle
- Arrondissement: Nancy
- Canton: Pont-à-Mousson
- Intercommunality: CC Bassin de Pont-à-Mousson

Government
  - Mayor (2020–2026): Pascal Fleury
- Area^{1}: 16.19 km^{2} (6.25 sq mi)
- Elevation: 219 m (719 ft)
- Highest elevation: 376 m (1,234 ft)
- Lowest elevation: 193 m (633 ft)
- Population (2023): 1,097
  - Density: 67.76/km^{2} (175.5/sq mi)
- Time zone: UTC+01:00 (CET)
  - Summer (DST): UTC+02:00 (CEST)
- INSEE/Postal code: 54375 /54700
- ^{1} French Land Register data, which excludes lakes, ponds, glaciers > 1 km^{2} (0.386 sq mi or 247 acres) and river estuaries.

Montauville (French pronunciation: [mɔ̃tovil]) is a commune in the Meurthe-et-Moselle department in north-eastern France.

It is the location of the French Le Pétant military cemetery, with WWI casualties of the Battle of Bois-le-Prêtre, and French WWII soldiers which died in German captivity.

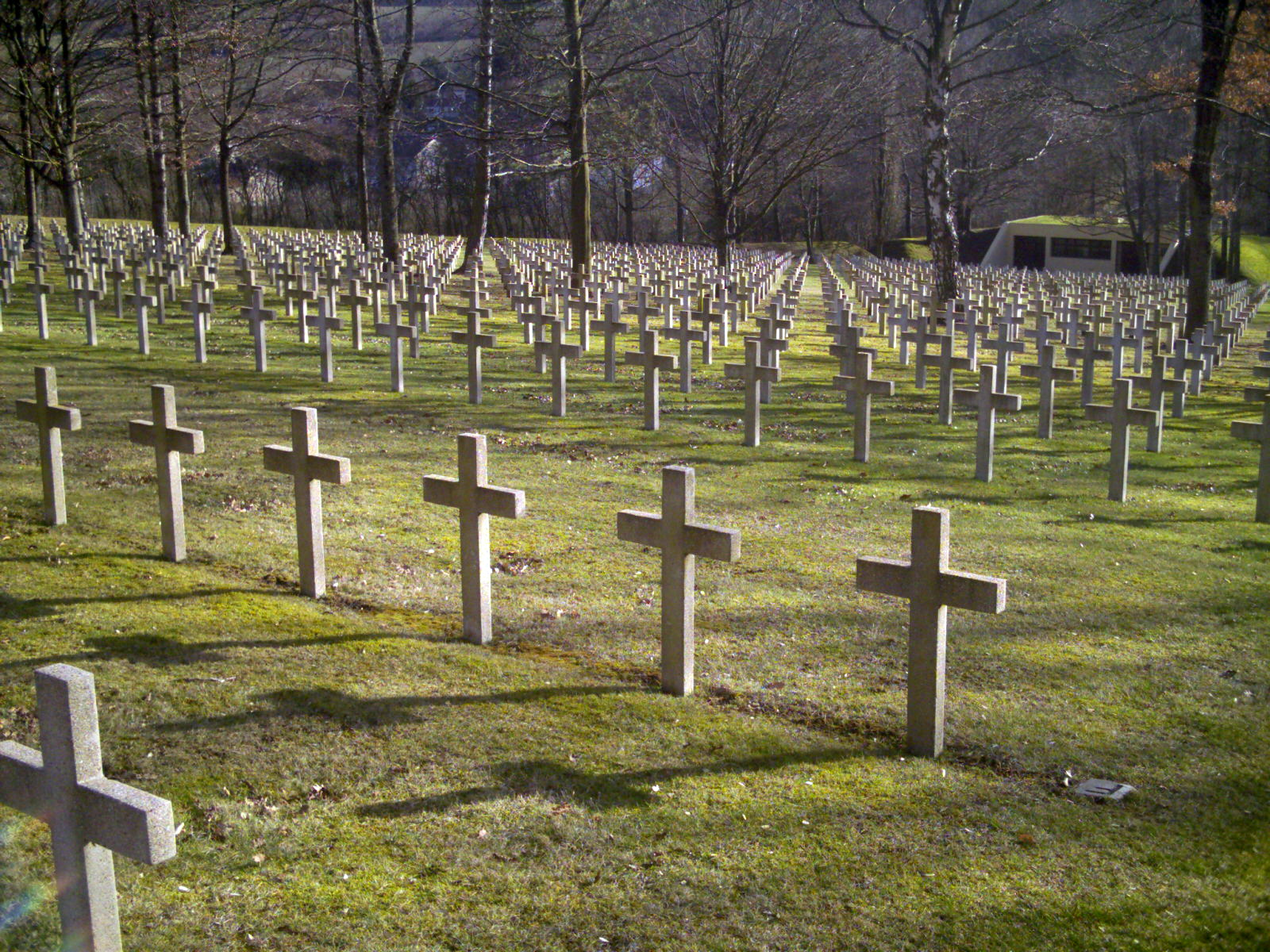
French Le Pétant cemetery (Montauville)

== See also ==
- Communes of the Meurthe-et-Moselle department
- Parc naturel régional de Lorraine
