= Fey-en-Haye =

- Commune
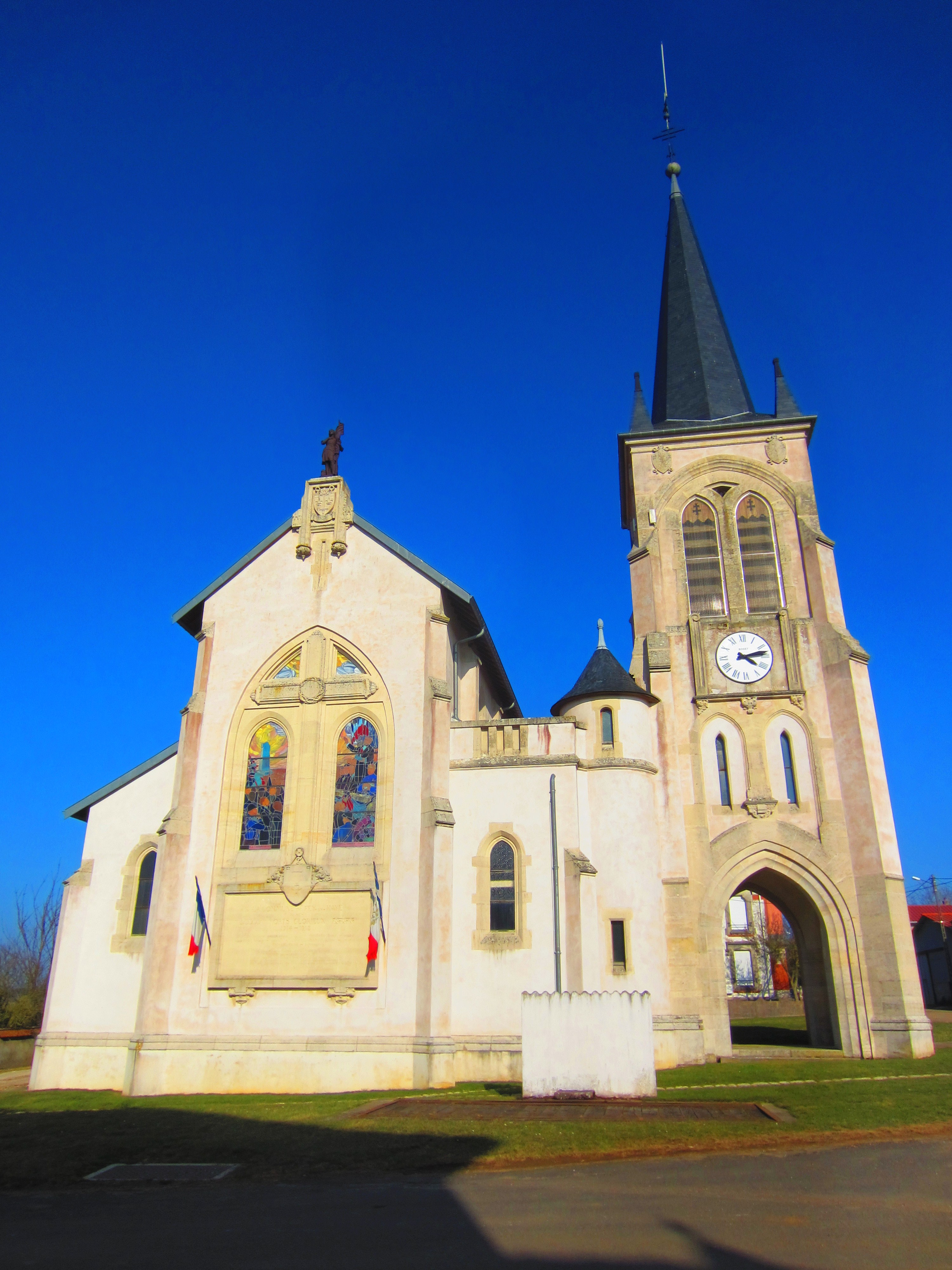
- The church in Fey-en-Haye

- Coat of arms
- Location of Fey-en-Haye
- Location within France Location within Grand Est
- Coordinates: 48°54′13″N 5°57′44″E
- Country: France
- Region: Grand Est
- Department: Meurthe-et-Moselle
- Arrondissement: Toul
- Canton: Pont-à-Mousson
- Intercommunality: Mad et Moselle

Government
  - Mayor (2020–2026): Jessica Robert
- Area^{1}: 7.05 km^{2} (2.72 sq mi)
- Highest elevation: 375 m (1,230 ft)
- Lowest elevation: 280 m (920 ft)
- Population (2023): 57
  - Density: 8.1/km^{2} (21/sq mi)
- Time zone: UTC+01:00 (CET)
  - Summer (DST): UTC+02:00 (CEST)
- INSEE/Postal code: 54193 /54470
- ^{1} French Land Register data, which excludes lakes, ponds, glaciers > 1 km^{2} (0.386 sq mi or 247 acres) and river estuaries.

Fey-en-Haye (French pronunciation: [fɛ ɑ̃ ɛ]) is a commune in the Meurthe-et-Moselle department in north-eastern France.

== See also ==
- Communes of the Meurthe-et-Moselle department
- Parc naturel régional de Lorraine
