= Maidières =

- Commune
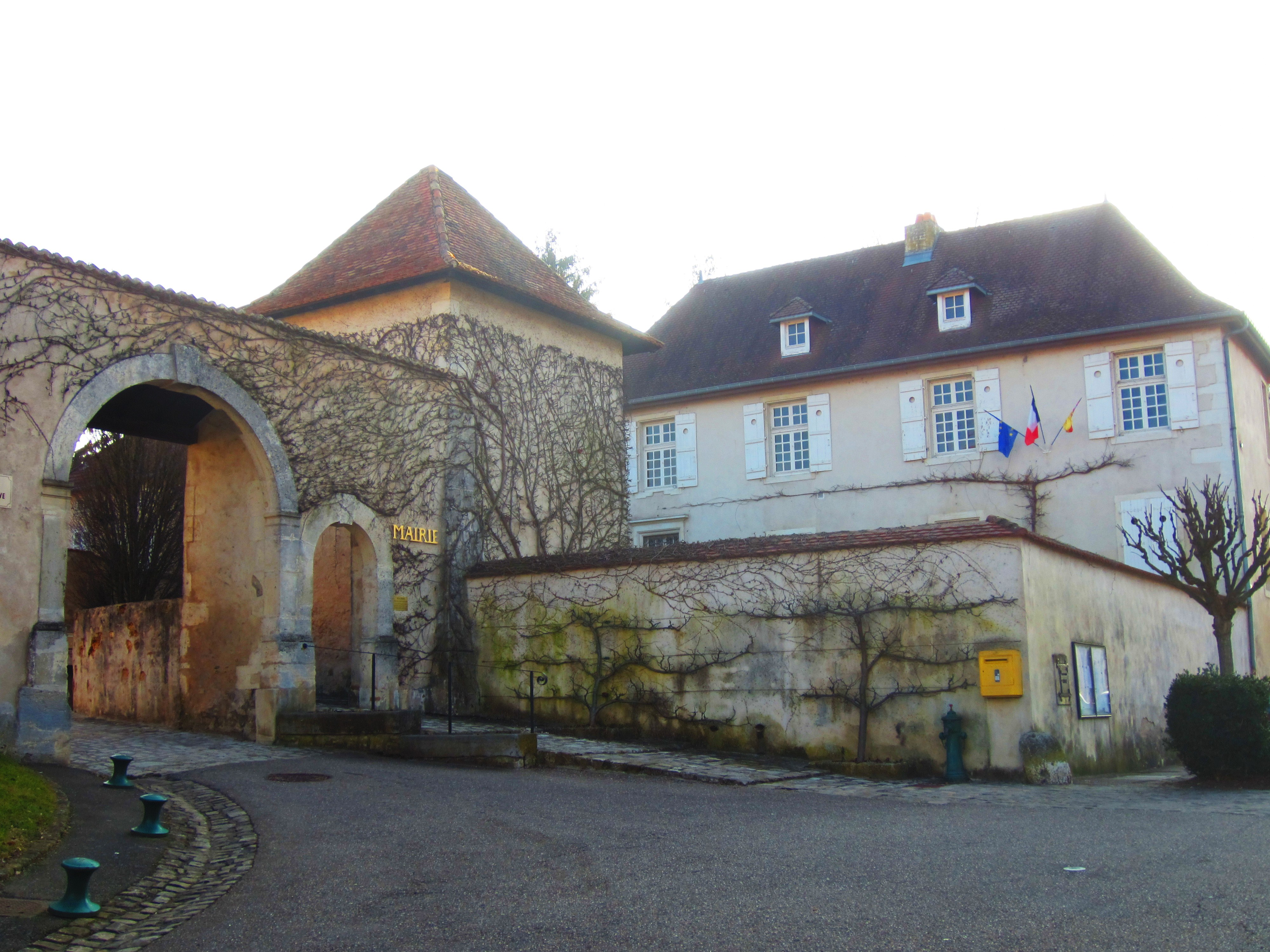
- The town hall in Maidières

- Coat of arms
- Location of Maidières
- Location within France Location within Grand Est
- Coordinates: 48°53′59″N 6°02′17″E
- Country: France
- Region: Grand Est
- Department: Meurthe-et-Moselle
- Arrondissement: Nancy
- Canton: Pont-à-Mousson
- Intercommunality: CC Bassin de Pont-à-Mousson

Government
  - Mayor (2020–2026): Gérard Boyé
- Area^{1}: 1.81 km^{2} (0.70 sq mi)
- Elevation: 195 m (640 ft)
- Highest elevation: 305 m (1,001 ft)
- Lowest elevation: 182 m (597 ft)
- Population (2023): 1,492
  - Density: 824/km^{2} (2,130/sq mi)
- Time zone: UTC+01:00 (CET)
  - Summer (DST): UTC+02:00 (CEST)
- INSEE/Postal code: 54332 /54700
- ^{1} French Land Register data, which excludes lakes, ponds, glaciers > 1 km^{2} (0.386 sq mi or 247 acres) and river estuaries.

Maidières (French pronunciation: [mɛdjɛʁ]) is a commune in the Meurthe-et-Moselle department in north-eastern France.

== See also ==
- Communes of the Meurthe-et-Moselle department
- Parc naturel régional de Lorraine
