= Norroy-lès-Pont-à-Mousson =

- Commune
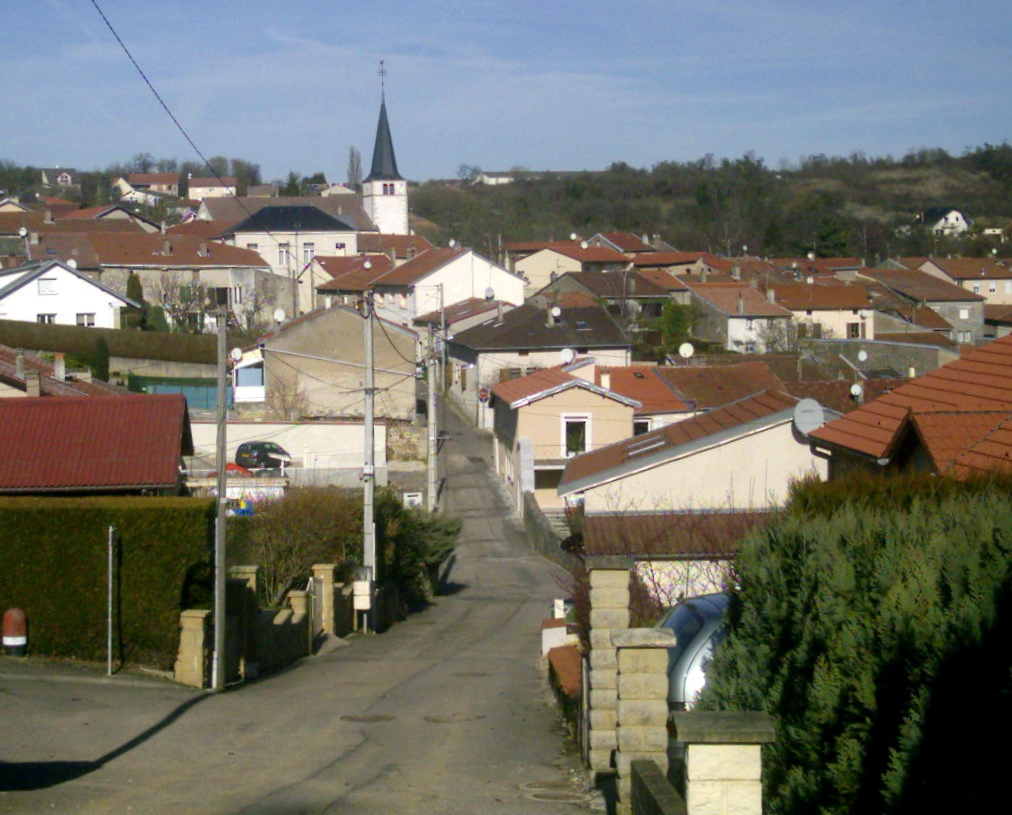
- A view within Norroy-lès-Pont-à-Mousson

- Coat of arms
- Location of Norroy-lès-Pont-à-Mousson
- Location within France Location within Grand Est
- Coordinates: 48°56′06″N 6°01′46″E
- Country: France
- Region: Grand Est
- Department: Meurthe-et-Moselle
- Arrondissement: Nancy
- Canton: Pont-à-Mousson
- Intercommunality: CC Bassin de Pont-à-Mousson

Government
  - Mayor (2020–2026): Gérard Villemet
- Area^{1}: 5.89 km^{2} (2.27 sq mi)
- Elevation: 260 m (850 ft)
- Highest elevation: 375 m (1,230 ft)
- Lowest elevation: 177 m (581 ft)
- Population (2023): 1,149
  - Density: 195/km^{2} (505/sq mi)
- Time zone: UTC+01:00 (CET)
  - Summer (DST): UTC+02:00 (CEST)
- INSEE/Postal code: 54403 /54700
- ^{1} French Land Register data, which excludes lakes, ponds, glaciers > 1 km^{2} (0.386 sq mi or 247 acres) and river estuaries.

Norroy-lès-Pont-à-Mousson (French pronunciation: [nɔʁwa lɛ pɔ̃.t‿a musɔ̃], literally Norroy near Pont-à-Mousson) is a commune in the Meurthe-et-Moselle department in north-eastern France.

== See also ==
- Communes of the Meurthe-et-Moselle department
- Parc naturel régional de Lorraine
