= Prény =

- Commune
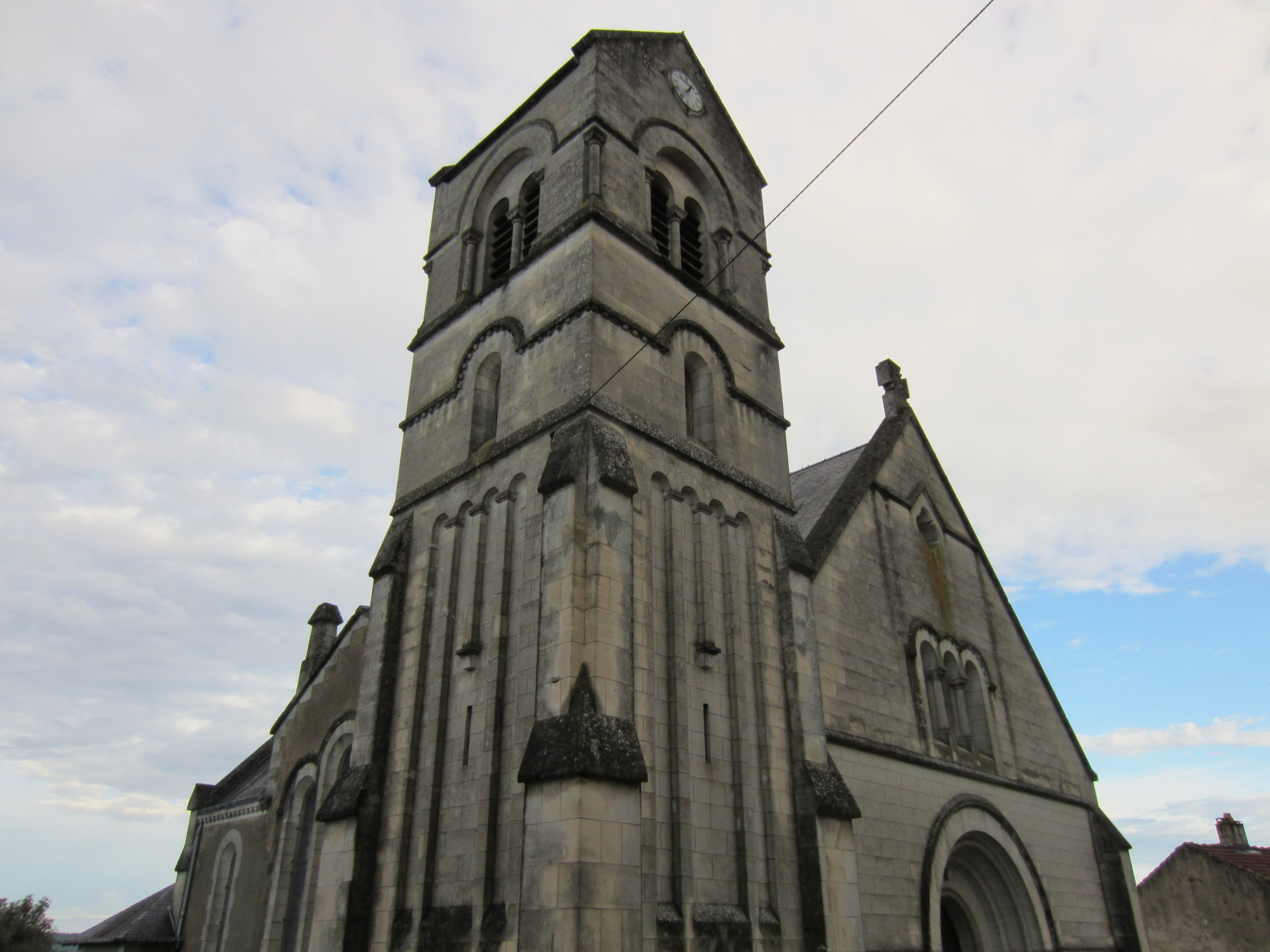
- The church in Prény

- Coat of arms
- Location of Prény
- Location within France Location within Grand Est
- Coordinates: 48°58′44″N 5°59′52″E
- Country: France
- Region: Grand Est
- Department: Meurthe-et-Moselle
- Arrondissement: Toul
- Canton: Pont-à-Mousson

Government
  - Mayor (2020–2026): Nicolas Sibille
- Area^{1}: 15.09 km^{2} (5.83 sq mi)
- Elevation: 365 m (1,198 ft)
- Highest elevation: 378 m (1,240 ft)
- Lowest elevation: 185 m (607 ft)
- Population (2023): 374
  - Density: 24.8/km^{2} (64.2/sq mi)
- Time zone: UTC+01:00 (CET)
  - Summer (DST): UTC+02:00 (CEST)
- INSEE/Postal code: 54435 /54530
- ^{1} French Land Register data, which excludes lakes, ponds, glaciers > 1 km^{2} (0.386 sq mi or 247 acres) and river estuaries.

Prény (French pronunciation: [pʁeni]) is a commune in the Meurthe-et-Moselle department in north-eastern France.

== See also ==
- Communes of the Meurthe-et-Moselle department
- Parc naturel régional de Lorraine
