= Marcel Husson =

French footballer and manager (1937–2025)

Personal information
- Date of birth: 23 January 1937
- Place of birth: Metz, France
- Date of death: 3 October 2025 (aged 88)
- Position: Defender

Youth career
- 1947–1955: AS Borny
- 1955–1957: CS Blénod
- 1957–1959: Rabat

Senior career*
Years	Team	Apps	(Gls)
1960–1967	Metz	159	(11)
1967–1971	AS Talanges		
1971–1978	Amnéville		

Managerial career
- 1967–1971: AS Talanges
- 1971–1978: Amnéville
- 1978–1984: Metz (youth coach)
- 1984–1989: Metz
- 1989–1990: Lens
- 1990–1991: Gueugnon
- 1991: Nancy
- 1992–1993: Club Africain
- 1994–1995: Al Taawoun
- 1995–1996: GFCO Ajaccio
- 1996–1997: WAC Casablanca
- * Club domestic league appearances and goals

Marcel Husson (23 January 1937 – 3 October 2025) was a French football player and manager.

== Playing career ==
Husson was born in Metz. A defender, he played for Metz, AS Talanges and Amnéville.

== Managerial career ==
Husson coached AS Talanges, Amnéville, Metz, Lens, Gueugnon, Nancy, Club Africain, Buraydah, GFCO Ajaccio and WAC Casablanca.

== Death ==
Husson died on 3 October 2025, at the age of 88.
