= Joseph Magiera =

French footballer (1939–2024)

Personal information
- Date of birth: 6 March 1939
- Place of birth: Blénod-lès-Pont-à-Mousson, France
- Date of death: 24 October 2024 (aged 85)
- Height: 1.83 m (6 ft 0 in)
- Position: Goalkeeper

Senior career*
Years	Team	Apps	(Gls)
1959–1962	FC Nancy	33	(0)
1962–1970	Valenciennes	279	(0)
1970–1972	Nancy	79	(0)
1972–1977	C.S. Blénod		
Total		348	(0)
- * Club domestic league appearances and goals

Joseph Magiera (6 March 1939 – 24 October 2024) was a French footballer who played as a goalkeeper.

== Biography ==
Born in Blénod-lès-Pont-à-Mousson, Magiera began his career with FC Nancy before joining Valenciennes and AS Nancy Lorraine. He finished his career with C.S. Blénod as a player-coach. In total, he played 348 matches in Division 1.

Magiera died on 24 October 2024, at the age of 85.
