= Vandières, Meurthe-et-Moselle =

Vandières
- Commune
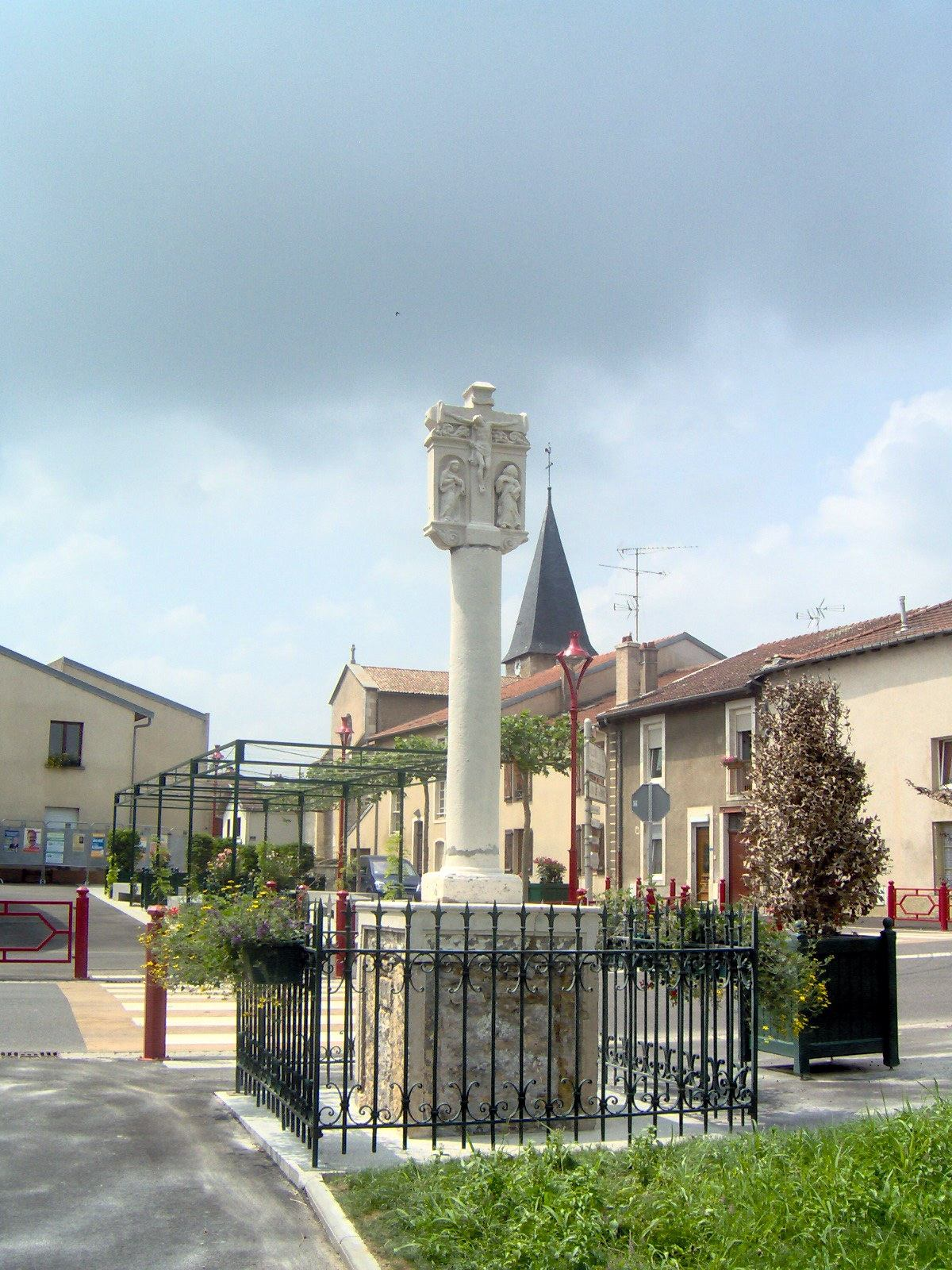
- Memorial

- Coat of arms
- Location of Vandières
- Location within France Location within Grand Est
- Coordinates: 48°57′18″N 6°02′14″E
- Country: France
- Region: Grand Est
- Department: Meurthe-et-Moselle
- Arrondissement: Nancy
- Canton: Pont-à-Mousson

Government
  - Mayor (2020–2026): Claude Robert
- Area^{1}: 12.35 km^{2} (4.77 sq mi)
- Elevation: 180 m (590 ft)
- Highest elevation: 375 m (1,230 ft)
- Lowest elevation: 172 m (564 ft)
- Population (2023): 934
  - Density: 75.6/km^{2} (196/sq mi)
- Time zone: UTC+01:00 (CET)
  - Summer (DST): UTC+02:00 (CEST)
- INSEE/Postal code: 54546 /54121
- ^{1} French Land Register data, which excludes lakes, ponds, glaciers > 1 km^{2} (0.386 sq mi or 247 acres) and river estuaries.

Vandières (French pronunciation: [vɑ̃djɛʁ]) is a commune in the Meurthe-et-Moselle department in north-eastern France.

== People ==
Vandières was the birthplace of:

- John of Gorze (d. 975), monastic reformer and diplomat

== See also ==
- Communes of the Meurthe-et-Moselle department
