= Lorraine Football League =

- Sport: List: Football
- Jurisdiction: France
- Abbreviation: LLF
- Founded: 1920
- Headquarters: Paris
- Closure date: 2016; 9 years ago

The Lorraine Football League (French: Ligue lorraine de football, LLF) was a federal body under the auspices of the French Football Federation (FFF), which was in charge of organizing football competitions for the FFF-affiliated clubs in Lorraine, currently located in the administrative region of Grand Est.

== History ==
In German Lorraine, the clubs formed a committee called Saargau Westkreis in 1905, which in 1911 took the name Sarre et Moselle (Saar and Moselle, which was chaired by the German Otto Wagner and whose secretary was the Lorraine native Lucien Poinsignon, who used this position to create the Lorraine Football League, a championship that brought together clubs from Saarland and the Trier region. Within this committee, the Lorrainers and the Germans worked closely together to organize friendly matches, tournaments, and local challenges, to promote the development of football in schools, and even to draw up lists of the best players for the selections of the southern German federal team.

Poinsignon also founded Cercle athlétique messin (currently known as FC Metz), which won 8 championships between 1919 and 1932.

== Winners ==
Domination in Lorraine from 1924 to 2016

- From 1924 to 1932: Highest-ranked club in the Lorraine Division of Honor.
- From 1932 to 1939: Highest-ranked club in the national division.
- From 1939 to 1945: Information not known.
- From 1945 to 2016: Highest-ranked club in the national division.

=== Regional winners ===
Saison	Division of Honor	Promotion/Division of Honor Regional	Coupe de Lorraine	Women's Honor Division
1920–21	CA Messin (2)	CSO Amnéville	AS Messine	-
1921–22	CA Messin (3)	US Lunéville	US Lunéville	-
1922–23	Thionville Lusitanos	CSO Amnéville	US Forbach	-
1923–24	CA Messin (4)	UL Moyeuvre	US Lunéville	-
1924–25	Thionville Lusitanos (2)	La Renaissance Petite-Rosselle	Thionville Lusitanos	-
1925–26	CA Messin (5)	CS Stiring-Wendel	CA Messin	-
1926–27	CA Messin (6)	Thionville Lusitanos	La Renaissance Petite-Rosselle	-
1927–28	Thionville Lusitanos (3)	AS Messine	La Renaissance Petite-Rosselle	-
1928–29	CA Messin (7)	AS Hayange	Thionville Lusitanos	-
1929–30	AS Messine	SU Lorrain Nancy	CSO Amnéville	-
1930–31	CA Messin (8)	UL Moyeuvre	UL Moyeuvre	-
1931–32	AS Messine (2)	Thionville Lusitanos	CS Stiring-Wendel	-
