= Blénod-lès-Pont-à-Mousson =

- Commune
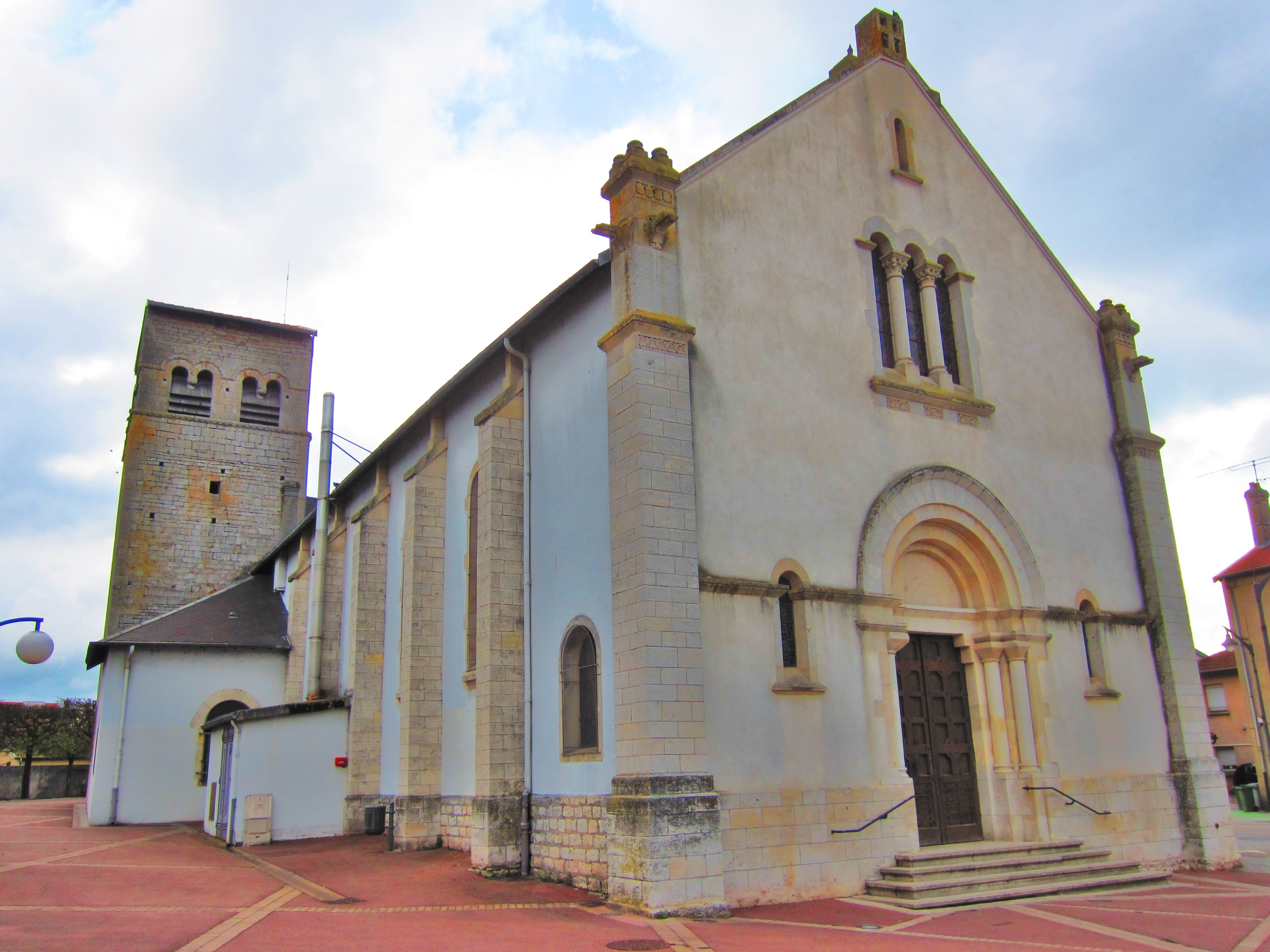
- The church in Blénod-lès-Pont-à-Mousson

- Coat of arms
- Location of Blénod-lès-Pont-à-Mousson
- Location within France Location within Grand Est
- Coordinates: 48°53′02″N 6°02′53″E
- Country: France
- Region: Grand Est
- Department: Meurthe-et-Moselle
- Arrondissement: Nancy
- Canton: Pont-à-Mousson
- Intercommunality: Bassin de Pont-à-Mousson

Government
  - Mayor (2020–2026): Bernard Bertelle
- Area^{1}: 9.58 km^{2} (3.70 sq mi)
- Elevation: 182 m (597 ft)
- Highest elevation: 331 m (1,086 ft)
- Lowest elevation: 179 m (587 ft)
- Population (2023): 4,659
  - Density: 486/km^{2} (1,260/sq mi)
- Time zone: UTC+01:00 (CET)
  - Summer (DST): UTC+02:00 (CEST)
- INSEE/Postal code: 54079 /54700
- ^{1} French Land Register data, which excludes lakes, ponds, glaciers > 1 km^{2} (0.386 sq mi or 247 acres) and river estuaries.

Blénod-lès-Pont-à-Mousson (French pronunciation: [bleno lɛ pɔ̃.t‿a musɔ̃], literally Blénod near Pont-à-Mousson) is a commune in the Meurthe-et-Moselle department in northeastern France.

== Population ==
Historical population
Year	Pop.	±% p.a.
1968	3,802	—
1975	4,074	+0.99%
1982	4,553	+1.60%
1990	4,768	+0.58%
1999	4,899	+0.30%
2007	4,434	−1.24%
2012	4,346	−0.40%
2017	4,601	+1.15%
2023	4,659	+0.21%
Source: INSEE

== See also ==
- Communes of the Meurthe-et-Moselle department
