= List of deputies of the 17th National Assembly of France =

This is a list of deputies of the 17th National Assembly of France under the Fifth Republic. They were elected in the 2024 legislative election and subsequent by-elections.

== Parliamentary groups ==
Composition of the National Assembly as of 20 July 2024
Parliamentary group		Members	Related	Total	President
RN	National Rally	123	3	126	Marine Le Pen
EPR	Together for the Republic	87	12	99	Gabriel Attal
LFI-NFP	La France Insoumise-New Popular Front	71	1	72	Mathilde Panot
SOC	Socialists and Affiliated	62	4	66	Boris Vallaud
DR	Republican Right group	41	6	47	Laurent Wauquiez
ECO	Social and Ecologist Group	38	0	38	Cyrielle Chatelain
DEM	The Democrats	35	1	36	Marc Fesneau
HOR	Horizons and Affiliated	26	5	31	Laurent Marcangeli
LIOT	Liberties, Independents, Overseas and Territories	21	0	21	Stéphane Lenormand
GDR	Democratic and Republican Left	17	0	17	André Chassaigne
UDR	UDR group	16	0	16	Éric Ciotti
NI	Non-Attached Members	–	–	8	–

== Deputies ==
Department	Constituency	Photo	Deputy	Party	Group
Ain	1st		Xavier Breton	LR	DR
Ain	2nd		Romain Daubié	MoDem	DEM
Ain	3rd		Olga Givernet	RE	EPR
Ain	4th		Jérôme Buisson	RN	RN
Ain	5th		Marc Chavent	UDR	UDR
Aisne	1st		Nicolas Dragon	RN	RN
Aisne	2nd		Julien Dive	LR	DR
Aisne	3rd		Eddy Casterman	IDL	RN
Aisne	4th		José Beaurain	RN	RN
Aisne	5th		Jocelyn Dessigny	RN	RN
Allier	1st		Yannick Monnet	PCF	GDR
Allier	2nd		Jorys Bovet	RN	RN
Allier	3rd		Nicolas Ray	LR	DR
Alpes-de-Haute-Provence	1st		Christian Girard	RN	RN
Alpes-de-Haute-Provence	2nd		Sophie Vaginay-Ricourt	RN	RN
Alpes-Maritimes	1st		Éric Ciotti	UDR	UDR
Alpes-Maritimes	2nd		Lionel Tivoli	RN	RN
Alpes-Maritimes	3rd		Bernard Chaix	UDR	UDR
Alpes-Maritimes	4th		Alexandra Masson	RN	RN
Alpes-Maritimes	5th		Christelle d'Intorni	UDR	UDR
Alpes-Maritimes	6th		Bryan Masson	RN	RN
Alpes-Maritimes	7th		Éric Pauget	LR	DR
Alpes-Maritimes	8th		Alexandra Martin	LR	DR
Alpes-Maritimes	9th		Michèle Tabarot	LR	DR
Ardèche	1st		Hervé Saulignac	PS	SOC
Ardèche	2nd		Vincent Trébuchet	UDR	UDR
Ardèche	3rd		Fabrice Brun	DVD	DR
Ardennes	1st		Lionel Vuibert	NI	NI
Ardennes	2nd		Pierre Cordier	LR	DR
Ardennes	3rd		Jean-Luc Warsmann	UDI	LIOT
Ariège	1st		Martine Froger	PS	SOC
Ariège	2nd		Audrey Abadie-Amiel*	DVG	LIOT
Aube	1st		Jordan Guitton	RN	RN
Aube	2nd		Valérie Bazin-Malgras	LR	DR
Aube	3rd		Angélique Ranc	RN	RN
Aude	1st		Christophe Barthès	RN	RN
Aude	2nd		Frédéric Falcon	RN	RN
Aude	3rd		Julien Rancoule	RN	RN
Aveyron	1st		Stéphane Mazars	RE	EPR
Aveyron	2nd		Laurent Alexandre	LFI	LFI-NFP
Aveyron	3rd		Jean-François Rousset	RE	EPR
Bas-Rhin	1st		Sandra Regol	LE	ECO
Bas-Rhin	2nd		Emmanuel Fernandes	LFI	LFI-NFP
Bas-Rhin	3rd		Thierry Sother	PS	SOC
Bas-Rhin	4th		Françoise Buffet	RE	EPR
Bas-Rhin	5th		Charles Sitzenstuhl	RE	EPR
Bas-Rhin	6th		Louise Morel	MoDem	DEM
Bas-Rhin	7th		Patrick Hetzel	LR	DR
Bas-Rhin	8th		Théo Bernhardt	RN	RN
Bas-Rhin	9th		Vincent Thiébaut	HOR	HOR
Bouches-du-Rhône	1st		Monique Griseti	RN	RN
Bouches-du-Rhône	2nd		Laurent Lhardit	PS	SOC
Bouches-du-Rhône	3rd		Gisèle Lelouis	RN	RN
Bouches-du-Rhône	4th		Manuel Bompard	LFI	LFI-NFP
Bouches-du-Rhône	5th		Hendrik Davi	LAP	ECO
Bouches-du-Rhône	6th		Olivier Fayssat	UDR	UDR
Bouches-du-Rhône	7th		Sébastien Delogu	LFI	LFI-NFP
Bouches-du-Rhône	8th		Romain Tonussi	RN	RN
Bouches-du-Rhône	9th		Joëlle Mélin	RN	RN
Bouches-du-Rhône	10th		José Gonzalez	RN	RN
Bouches-du-Rhône	11th		Marc Pena	PS	SOC
Bouches-du-Rhône	12th		Franck Allisio	RN	RN
Bouches-du-Rhône	13th		Emmanuel Fouquart	RN	RN
Bouches-du-Rhône	14th		Gérault Verny	UDR	UDR
Bouches-du-Rhône	15th		Romain Baubry	RN	RN
Bouches-du-Rhône	16th		Emmanuel Taché de La Pagerie	RN	RN
Calvados	1st		Joël Bruneau	DVD	LIOT
Calvados	2nd		Arthur Delaporte	PS	SOC
Calvados	3rd		Jérémie Patrier-Leitus	HOR	HOR
Calvados	4th		Christophe Blanchet	MoDem	DEM
Calvados	5th		Bertrand Bouyx	HOR	HOR
Calvados	6th		Élisabeth Borne	RE	EPR
Cantal	1st		Vincent Descœur	LR	DR
Cantal	2nd		Jean-Yves Bony	LR	DR
Charente	1st		René Pilato	LFI	LFI-NFP
Charente	2nd		Sandra Marsaud	RE	EPR
Charente	3rd		Caroline Colombier	RN	RN
Charente-Maritime	1st		Olivier Falorni	DVG	DEM
Charente-Maritime	2nd		Benoît Biteau	LE	ECO
Charente-Maritime	3rd		Fabrice Barusseau	PS	SOC
Charente-Maritime	4th		Pascal Markowsky	RN	RN
Charente-Maritime	5th		Christophe Plassard	HOR	HOR
Cher	1st		François Cormier-Bouligeon	RE	EPR
Cher	2nd		Nicolas Sansu	PCF	GDR
Cher	3rd		Loïc Kervran	HOR	HOR
Corrèze	1st		François Hollande	PS	SOC
Corrèze	2nd		Frédérique Meunier	LR	DR
Corse-du-Sud	1st		Laurent Marcangeli	HOR	HOR
Corse-du-Sud	2nd		Paul-André Colombani	PNC	LIOT
Côte-d'Or	1st		Océane Godard	PS	SOC
Côte-d'Or	2nd		Catherine Hervieu	LE	ECO
Côte-d'Or	3rd		Pierre Pribetich	PS	SOC
Côte-d'Or	4th		Hubert Brigand	LR	DR
Côte-d'Or	5th		René Lioret	RN	RN
Côtes-d'Armor	1st		Mickaël Cosson	MoDem	DEM
Côtes-d'Armor	2nd		Hervé Berville	RE	EPR
Côtes-d'Armor	3rd		Corentin Le Fur	LR	DR
Côtes-d'Armor	4th		Murielle Lepvraud	LFI	LFI-NFP
Côtes-d'Armor	5th		Éric Bothorel	RE	EPR
Creuse	1st		Bartolomé Lenoir	UDR	UDR
Deux-Sèvres	1st		Bastien Marchive	RE	EPR
Deux-Sèvres	2nd		Delphine Batho	GE	ECO
Deux-Sèvres	3rd		Jean-Marie Fiévet	RE	EPR
Dordogne	1st		Nadine Lechon	RN	RN
Dordogne	2nd		Serge Muller	RN	RN
Dordogne	3rd		Florence Joubert	RN	RN
Dordogne	4th		Sébastien Peytavie	G.s	ECO
Doubs	1st		Laurent Croizier	MoDem	DEM
Doubs	2nd		Dominique Voynet	LE	ECO
Doubs	3rd		Matthieu Bloch	UDR	UDR
Doubs	4th		Géraldine Grangier	RN	RN
Doubs	5th		Annie Genevard	LR	DR
Drôme	1st		Paul Christophle	PS	SOC
Drôme	2nd		Lisette Pollet	RN	RN
Drôme	3rd		Marie Pochon	LE	ECO
Drôme	4th		Thibaut Monnier	IDL	RN
Essonne	1st		Farida Amrani	LFI	LFI-NFP
Essonne	2nd		Nathalie da Conceicao Carvalho	RN	RN
Essonne	3rd		Steevy Gustave	LE	ECO
Essonne	4th		Marie-Pierre Rixain	RE	EPR
Essonne	5th		Paul Midy	RE	EPR
Essonne	6th		Jérôme Guedj	PS	SOC
Essonne	7th		Claire Lejeune	LFI	LFI-NFP
Essonne	8th		Bérenger Cernon	LFI	LFI-NFP
Essonne	9th		Julie Ozenne	LE	ECO
Essonne	10th		Antoine Léaument	LFI	LFI-NFP
Eure	1st		Christine Loir	RN	RN
Eure	2nd		Katiana Levavasseur	RN	RN
Eure	3rd		Kévin Mauvieux	RN	RN
Eure	4th		Philippe Brun	PS	SOC
Eure	5th		Timothée Houssin	RN	RN
Eure-et-Loir	1st		Guillaume Kasbarian	RE	EPR
Eure-et-Loir	2nd		Olivier Marleix	LR	DR
Eure-et-Loir	3rd		Harold Huwart	PR	LIOT
Eure-et-Loir	4th		Philippe Vigier	MoDem	DEM
Finistère	1st		Annaïg Le Meur	RE	EPR
Finistère	2nd		Pierre-Yves Cadalen	LFI	LFI-NFP
Finistère	3rd		Didier Le Gac	RE	EPR
Finistère	4th		Sandrine Le Feur	RE	EPR
Finistère	5th		Graziella Melchior	RE	EPR
Finistère	6th		Mélanie Thomin	PS	SOC
Finistère	7th		Liliana Tanguy	RE	EPR
Finistère	8th		Erwan Balanant	MoDem	DEM
Gard	1st		Yoann Gillet	RN	RN
Gard	2nd		Nicolas Meizonnet	RN	RN
Gard	3rd		Pascale Bordes	RN	RN
Gard	4th		Pierre Meurin	RN	RN
Gard	5th		Alexandre Allegret-Pilot	UDR	UDR
Gard	6th		Sylvie Josserand	RN	RN
Gers	1st		Jean-René Cazeneuve	RE	EPR
Gers	2nd		David Taupiac	DVG	LIOT
Gironde	1st		Thomas Cazenave	RE	EPR
Gironde	2nd		Nicolas Thierry	LE	ECO
Gironde	3rd		Loïc Prud'homme	LFI	LFI-NFP
Gironde	4th		Alain David	PS	EPR
Gironde	5th		Pascale Got	PS	SOC
Gironde	6th		Marie Récalde	PS	SOC
Gironde	7th		Sébastien Saint-Pasteur	PS	SOC
Gironde	8th		Sophie Panonacle	RE	EPR
Gironde	9th		Sophie Mette	MoDem	DEM
Gironde	10th		Florent Boudié	RE	ECO
Gironde	11th		Edwige Diaz	RN	RN
Gironde	12th		Mathilde Feld	LFI	LFI-NFP
Guadeloupe	1st		Olivier Serva	DVG	LIOT
Guadeloupe	2nd		Christian Baptiste	PPDG	SOC
Guadeloupe	3rd		Max Mathiasin	DVG	LIOT
Guadeloupe	4th		Élie Califer	PS	SOC
French Guiana	1st		Jean-Victor Castor	MDES	GDR
French Guiana	2nd		Davy Rimane	PLD	GDR
Haut-Rhin	1st		Brigitte Klinkert	RE	EPR
Haut-Rhin	2nd		Hubert Ott	MoDem	DEM
Haut-Rhin	3rd		Didier Lemaire	HOR	HOR
Haut-Rhin	4th		Raphaël Schellenberger	R&PS	NI
Haut-Rhin	5th		Olivier Becht	RE	EPR
Haut-Rhin	6th		Bruno Fuchs	MoDem	DEM
Haute-Corse	1st		Michel Castellani	R&PS	LIOT
Haute-Corse	2nd		François-Xavier Ceccoli	DVD	DR
Haute-Garonne	1st		Hadrien Clouet	LFI	LFI-NFP
Haute-Garonne	2nd		Anne Stambach-Terrenoir	LFI	LFI-NFP
Haute-Garonne	3rd		Corinne Vignon	RE	EPR
Haute-Garonne	4th		François Piquemal	LFI	LFI-NFP
Haute-Garonne	5th		Jean-François Portarrieu	HOR	HOR
Haute-Garonne	6th		Arnaud Simion	PS	
Haute-Garonne	7th		Christophe Bex	LFI	LFI-NFP
Haute-Garonne	8th		Joël Aviragnet	PS	SOC
Haute-Garonne	9th		Christine Arrighi	LE	ECO
Haute-Garonne	10th		Jacques Oberti	PS	SOC
Haute-Loire	1st		Laurent Wauquiez	LR	DR
Haute-Loire	2nd		Jean-Pierre Vigier	LR	DR
Haute-Marne	1st		Christophe Bentz	RN	RN
Haute-Marne	2nd		Laurence Robert-Dehault	RN	RN
Haute-Saône	1st		Antoine Villedieu	RN	RN
Haute-Saône	2nd		Emeric Salmon	RN	RN
Haute-Savoie	1st		Véronique Riotton	RE	EPR
Haute-Savoie	2nd		Antoine Armand	RE	EPR
Haute-Savoie	3rd		Antoine Valentin	UDR	UDR
Haute-Savoie	4th		Virginie Duby-Muller	LR	DR
Haute-Savoie	5th		Anne-Cécile Violland	HOR	HOR
Haute-Savoie	6th		Xavier Roseren	HOR	HOR
Haute-Vienne	1st		Damien Maudet	LFI	LFI-NFP
Haute-Vienne	2nd		Stéphane Delautrette	PS	SOC
Haute-Vienne	3rd		Manon Meunier	LFI	LFI-NFP
Hautes-Alpes	1st		Marie-José Allemand	PS	SOC
Hautes-Alpes	2nd		Valérie Rossi	PS	SOC
Hautes-Pyrénées	1st		Sylvie Ferrer	LFI	LFI-NFP
Hautes-Pyrénées	2nd		Denis Fégné	PS	SOC
Hauts-de-Seine	1st		Elsa Faucillon	PCF	GDR
Hauts-de-Seine	2nd		Thomas Lam	LR	DR
Hauts-de-Seine	3rd		Philippe Juvin	LR	DR
Hauts-de-Seine	4th		Sabrina Sebaihi	LE	ECO
Hauts-de-Seine	5th		Céline Calvez	RE	EPR
Hauts-de-Seine	6th		Constance Le Grip	RE	EPR
Hauts-de-Seine	7th		Pierre Cazeneuve	RE	EPR
Hauts-de-Seine	8th		Prisca Thevenot	RE	EPR
Hauts-de-Seine	9th		Élisabeth de Maistre	LR	DR
Hauts-de-Seine	10th		Gabriel Attal	RE	EPR
Hauts-de-Seine	11th		Aurélien Saintoul	LFI	LFI-NFP
Hauts-de-Seine	12th		Jean-Didier Berger	LR	DR
Hauts-de-Seine	13th		Maud Bregeon	RE	EPR
Hérault	1st		Jean-Louis Roumégas	LE	ECO
Hérault	2nd		Nathalie Oziol	LFI	LFI-NFP
Hérault	3rd		Fanny Dombre-Coste	PS	SOC
Hérault	4th		Manon Bouquin	RN	RN
Hérault	5th		Stéphanie Galzy	RN	RN
Hérault	6th		Julien Gabarron	RN	RN
Hérault	7th		Aurélien Lopez-Liguori	RN	RN
Hérault	8th		Sylvain Carrière	LFI	LFI-NFP
Hérault	9th		Charles Alloncle	UDR	UDR
Ille-et-Vilaine	1st		Marie Mesmeur	LFI	LFI-NFP
Ille-et-Vilaine	2nd		Tristan Lahais	G.s	ECO
Ille-et-Vilaine	3rd		Claudia Rouaux	PS	SOC
Ille-et-Vilaine	4th		Mathilde Hignet	LFI	LFI-NFP
Ille-et-Vilaine	5th		Christine Le Nabour	RE	EPR
Ille-et-Vilaine	6th		Thierry Benoit	HOR	HOR
Ille-et-Vilaine	7th		Jean-Luc Bourgeaux	LR	DR
Ille-et-Vilaine	8th		Mickaël Bouloux	PS	SOC
Indre	1st		François Jolivet	HOR	HOR
Indre	2nd		Nicolas Forissier	LR	DR
Indre-et-Loire	1st		Charles Fournier	LE	ECO
Indre-et-Loire	2nd		Daniel Labaronne	RE	EPR
Indre-et-Loire	3rd		Henri Alfandari	HOR	HOR
Indre-et-Loire	4th		Laurent Baumel	PS	SOC
Indre-et-Loire	5th		Sabine Thillaye	MoDem	DEM
Isère	1st		Hugo Prevost	LFI	LFI-NFP
Isère	2nd		Cyrielle Chatelain	LE	ECO
Isère	3rd		Élisa Martin	LFI	LFI-NFP
Isère	4th		Marie-Noëlle Battistel	PS	SOC
Isère	5th		Jérémie Iordanoff	LE	ECO
Isère	6th		Alexis Jolly	RN	RN
Isère	7th		Yannick Neuder	LR	DR
Isère	8th		Hanane Mansouri	UDR	UDR
Isère	9th		Sandrine Nosbé	LFI	LFI-NFP
Isère	10th		Thierry Perez	RN	RN
Jura	1st		Danielle Brulebois	RE	EPR
Jura	2nd		Marie-Christine Dalloz	LR	DR
Jura	3rd		Justine Gruet	LR	DR
La Réunion	1st		Philippe Naillet	PS	SOC
La Réunion	2nd		Karine Lebon	PLR	GDR
La Réunion	3rd		Joseph Rivière	RN	RN
La Réunion	4th		Emeline K/Bidi	LP	GDR
La Réunion	5th		Jean-Hugues Ratenon	LFI	LFI-NFP
La Réunion	6th		Frédéric Maillot	PLR	GDR
La Réunion	7th		Perceval Gaillard	LFI	LFI-NFP
Landes	1st		Geneviève Darrieussecq	MoDem	DEM
Landes	2nd		Lionel Causse	RE	EPR
Landes	3rd		Boris Vallaud	PS	SOC
Loir-et-Cher	1st		Marc Fesneau	MoDem	DEM
Loir-et-Cher	2nd		Roger Chudeau	RN	RN
Loir-et-Cher	3rd		Christophe Marion	RE	EPR
Loire	1st		Pierrick Courbon	PS	SOC
Loire	2nd		Andrée Taurinya	LFI	LFI-NFP
Loire	3rd		Emmanuel Mandon	MoDem	DEM
Loire	4th		Sylvie Bonnet	LR	DR
Loire	5th		Antoine Vermorel-Marques	LR	DR
Loire	6th		Jean-Pierre Taite	LR	DR
Loire-Atlantique	1st		Karim Benbrahim	PS	SOC
Loire-Atlantique	2nd		Andy Kerbrat	LFI	LFI-NFP
Loire-Atlantique	3rd		Ségolène Amiot	LFI	LFI-NFP
Loire-Atlantique	4th		Julie Laernoes	LE	ECO
Loire-Atlantique	5th		Fabrice Roussel	PS	SOC
Loire-Atlantique	6th		Jean-Claude Raux	LE	ECO
Loire-Atlantique	7th		Sandrine Josso	MoDem	DEM
Loire-Atlantique	8th		Matthias Tavel	LFI	LFI-NFP
Loire-Atlantique	9th		Jean-Michel Brard	DVD	HOR
Loire-Atlantique	10th		Sophie Errante	RE	EPR
Loiret	1st		Stéphanie Rist	RE	EPR
Loiret	2nd		Emmanuel Duplessy	G.s	ECO
Loiret	3rd		Constance de Pélichy	DVD	LIOT
Loiret	4th		Thomas Ménagé	RN	RN
Loiret	5th		Anthony Brosse	RE	EPR
Loiret	6th		Richard Ramos	MoDem	DEM
Lot	1st		Aurélien Pradié	LR	DR
Lot	2nd		Christophe Proença	PS	SOC
Lot-et-Garonne	1st		Michel Lauzzana	RE	EPR
Lot-et-Garonne	2nd		Hélène Laporte	RN	RN
Lot-et-Garonne	3rd		Guillaume Lepers	LR	DR
Lozère	1st		Sophie Pantel	PS	SOC
Maine-et-Loire	1st		François Gernigon	HOR	HOR
Maine-et-Loire	2nd		Stella Dupont	EC	EPR
Maine-et-Loire	3rd		Anne-Laure Blin	LR	DR
Maine-et-Loire	4th		Laetitia Saint-Paul	RE	EPR
Maine-et-Loire	5th		Denis Masséglia	RE	EPR
Maine-et-Loire	6th		Nicole Dubré-Chirat	RE	EPR
Maine-et-Loire	7th		Philippe Bolo	MoDem	DEM
Manche	1st		Philippe Gosselin	LR	DR
Manche	2nd		Bertrand Sorre	RE	EPR
Manche	3rd		Stéphane Travert	RE	EPR
Manche	4th		Anna Pic	PS	SOC
Marne	1st		Xavier Albertini	HOR	HOR
Marne	2nd		Laure Miller	RE	EPR
Marne	3rd		Maxime Michelet	UDR	UDR
Marne	4th		Lise Magnier	HOR	HOR
Marne	5th		Charles de Courson	LC	LIOT
Martinique	1st		Jiovanny William	Péyi-A	SOC
Martinique	2nd		Marcellin Nadeau	Péyi-A	GDR
Martinique	3rd		Béatrice Bellay	PS	SOC
Martinique	4th		Jean-Philippe Nilor	Péyi-A	LFI-NFP
Mayenne	1st		Guillaume Garot	PS	SOC
Mayenne	2nd		Géraldine Bannier	MoDem	DEM
Mayenne	3rd		Yannick Favennec	HOR	LIOT
Mayotte	1st		Estelle Youssouffa	UDI	LIOT
Mayotte	2nd		Anchya Bamana	RN	RN
Meurthe-et-Moselle	1st		Estelle Mercier	PS	SOC
Meurthe-et-Moselle	2nd		Stéphane Hablot	PS	SOC
Meurthe-et-Moselle	3rd		Frédéric Weber	RN	RN
Meurthe-et-Moselle	4th		Thibault Bazin	LR	DR
Meurthe-et-Moselle	5th		Dominique Potier	PS	SOC
Meurthe-et-Moselle	6th		Anthony Boulogne	RN	RN
Meuse	1st		Maxime Amblard	RN	RN
Meuse	2nd		Florence Goulet	RN	RN
Morbihan	1st		Anne Le Hénanff	HOR	HOR
Morbihan	2nd		Jimmy Pahun	MoDem	DEM
Morbihan	3rd		Nicole Le Peih	RE	EPR
Morbihan	4th		Paul Molac	R&PS	LIOT
Morbihan	5th		Damien Girard	LE	ECO
Morbihan	6th		Jean-Michel Jacques	RE	EPR
Moselle	1st		Belkhir Belhaddad	RE	EPR
Moselle	2nd		Ludovic Mendes	RE	EPR
Moselle	3rd		Nathalie Colin-Oesterlé	LC	HOR
Moselle	4th		Fabien Di Filippo	LR	DR
Moselle	5th		Pascal Jenft	RN	RN
Moselle	6th		Kévin Pfeffer	RN	RN
Moselle	7th		Alexandre Loubet	RN	RN
Moselle	8th		Laurent Jacobelli	RN	RN
Moselle	9th		Isabelle Rauch	HOR	HOR
Nièvre	1st		Perrine Goulet	MoDem	DEM
Nièvre	2nd		Julien Guibert	RN	RN
Nord	1st		Aurélien Le Coq	LFI	LFI-NFP
Nord	2nd		Ugo Bernalicis	LFI	LFI-NFP
Nord	3rd		Sandra Delannoy	RN	RN
Nord	4th		Brigitte Liso	RE	EPR
Nord	5th		Sébastien Huyghe	RE	EPR
Nord	6th		Charlotte Parmentier-Lecocq	RE	EPR
Nord	7th		Félicie Gérard	HOR	HOR
Nord	8th		David Guiraud	LFI	LFI-NFP
Nord	9th		Violette Spillebout	RE	EPR
Nord	10th		Vincent Ledoux*	RE	EPR
Nord	11th		Roger Vicot	PS	SOC
Nord	12th		Michaël Taverne	RN	RN
Nord	13th		Julien Gokel	PS	SOC
Nord	14th		Paul Christophe	HOR	HOR
Nord	15th		Jean-Pierre Bataille	DVD	LIOT
Nord	16th		Matthieu Marchio	RN	RN
Nord	17th		Thierry Tesson	UDR	UDR
Nord	18th		Alexandre Dufosset	RN	RN
Nord	19th		Sébastien Chenu	RN	RN
Nord	20th		Guillaume Florquin	RN	RN
Nord	21st		Valérie Létard	UDI	LIOT
New Caledonia	1st		Nicolas Metzdorf	GNC	EPR
New Caledonia	2nd		Emmanuel Tjibaou	UC	GDR
Oise	1st		Claire Marais-Beuil	RN	RN
Oise	2nd		Philippe Ballard	RN	RN
Oise	3rd		Alexandre Sabatou	RN	RN
Oise	4th		Éric Woerth	RE	EPR
Oise	5th		Frédéric Pierre Vos	RN	RN
Oise	6th		Michel Guiniot	RN	RN
Oise	7th		David Magnier	RN	RN
Orne	1st		Chantal Jourdan	PS	SOC
Orne	2nd		Véronique Louwagie	LR	DR
Orne	3rd		Jérôme Nury	LR	DR
Paris	1st		Sylvain Maillard	RE	EPR
Paris	2nd		Jean Laussucq	RE	EPR
Paris	3rd		Léa Balage El Mariky	LE	ECO
Paris	4th		Astrid Panosyan-Bouvet	RE	EPR
Paris	5th		Pouria Amirshahi	LE	ECO
Paris	6th		Sophia Chikirou	LFI	LFI-NFP
Paris	7th		Emmanuel Grégoire	PS	SOC
Paris	8th		Éva Sas	LE	ECO
Paris	9th		Sandrine Rousseau	LE	ECO
Paris	10th		Rodrigo Arenas	LFI	LFI-NFP
Paris	11th		Céline Hervieu	PS	SOC
Paris	12th		Olivia Gregoire	RE	EPR
Paris	13th		David Amiel	RE	EPR
Paris	14th		Benjamin Haddad	RE	EPR
Paris	15th		Danielle Simonnet	LAP	ECO
Paris	16th		Sarah Legrain	LFI	LFI-NFP
Paris	17th		Danièle Obono	LFI	LFI-NFP
Paris	18th		Aymeric Caron	REV	LFI-NFP
Pas-de-Calais	1st		Emmanuel Blairy	RN	RN
Pas-de-Calais	2nd		Agnès Pannier-Runacher	RE	EPR
Pas-de-Calais	3rd		Bruno Clavet	RN	RN
Pas-de-Calais	4th		Philippe Fait	RE	EPR
Pas-de-Calais	5th		Antoine Golliot	RN	RN
Pas-de-Calais	6th		Christine Engrand	RN	RN
Pas-de-Calais	7th		Marc de Fleurian	RN	RN
Pas-de-Calais	8th		Auguste Evrard	RN	RN
Pas-de-Calais	9th		Caroline Parmentier	RN	RN
Pas-de-Calais	10th		Thierry Frappé	RN	RN
Pas-de-Calais	11th		Marine Le Pen	RN	RN
Pas-de-Calais	12th		Bruno Bilde	RN	RN
French Polynesia	1st		Moerani Frébault	Tapura	EPR
French Polynesia	2nd		Nicole Sanquer	AHIP	LIOT
French Polynesia	3rd		Mereana Reid Arbelot	Tavini	GDR
Puy-de-Dôme	1st		Marianne Maximi	LFI	LFI-NFP
Puy-de-Dôme	2nd		Christine Pirès-Beaune	PS	SOC
Puy-de-Dôme	3rd		Nicolas Bonnet	LE	ECO
Puy-de-Dôme	4th		Delphine Lingemann	MoDem	DEM
Puy-de-Dôme	5th		André Chassaigne	PCF	GDR
Pyrénées-Atlantiques	1st		Josy Poueyto	MoDem	DEM
Pyrénées-Atlantiques	2nd		Jean-Paul Mattei	MoDem	DEM
Pyrénées-Atlantiques	3rd		David Habib	DVG	LIOT
Pyrénées-Atlantiques	4th		Iñaki Echaniz	PS	SOC
Pyrénées-Atlantiques	5th		Colette Capdevielle	PS	SOC
Pyrénées-Atlantiques	6th		Peio Dufau	EH Bai	SOC
Pyrénées-Orientales	1st		Sophie Blanc	RN	RN
Pyrénées-Orientales	2nd		Anaïs Sabatini	RN	RN
Pyrénées-Orientales	3rd		Sandrine Dogor-Such	RN	RN
Pyrénées-Orientales	4th		Michèle Martinez	RN	RN
Rhône	1st		Anaïs Belouassa-Cherifi	LFI	LFI-NFP
Rhône	2nd		Boris Tavernier	LE	ECO
Rhône	3rd		Marie-Charlotte Garin	LE	ECO
Rhône	4th		Sandrine Runel	PS	SOC
Rhône	5th		Blandine Brocard	MoDem	DEM
Rhône	6th		Gabriel Amard	LFI	LFI-NFP
Rhône	7th		Abdelkader Lahmar	LFI	LFI-NFP
Rhône	8th		Jonathan Géry	RN	RN
Rhône	9th		Alexandre Portier	LR	DR
Rhône	10th		Thomas Gassilloud	RE	EPR
Rhône	11th		Jean-Luc Fugit	RE	EPR
Rhône	12th		Cyrille Isaac-Sibille	MoDem	DEM
Rhône	13th		Tiffany Joncour	RN	RN
Rhône	14th		Idir Boumertit	LFI	LFI-NFP
Saint Barthélemy and Saint Martin	1st		Frantz Gumbs	RSM	DEM
Saint Pierre and Miquelon	1st		Stéphane Lenormand	AD	LIOT
Saône-et-Loire	1st		Benjamin Dirx	RE	EPR
Saône-et-Loire	2nd		Josiane Corneloup	LR	DR
Saône-et-Loire	3rd		Aurélien Dutremble	RN	RN
Saône-et-Loire	4th		Eric Michoux	UDR	UDR
Saône-et-Loire	5th		Arnaud Sanvert	RN	RN
Sarthe	1st		Julie Delpech	RE	EPR
Sarthe	2nd		Marietta Karamanli	PS	SOC
Sarthe	3rd		Éric Martineau	MoDem	DEM
Sarthe	4th		Élise Leboucher	LFI	LFI-NFP
Sarthe	5th		Jean-Carles Grelier	RE	EPR
Savoie	1st		Marina Ferrari	MoDem	DEM
Savoie	2nd		Vincent Rolland	LR	DR
Savoie	3rd		Émilie Bonnivard	LR	DR
Savoie	4th		Jean-François Coulomme	LFI	LFI-NFP
Seine-Maritime	1st		Florence Hérouin-Léautey	PS	SOC
Seine-Maritime	2nd		Annie Vidal	RE	EPR
Seine-Maritime	3rd		Édouard Bénard	PCF	GDR
Seine-Maritime	4th		Alma Dufour	LFI	LFI-NFP
Seine-Maritime	5th		Gérard Leseul	PS	SOC
Seine-Maritime	6th		Patrice Martin	RN	RN
Seine-Maritime	7th		Agnès Firmin-Le Bodo	HOR	HOR
Seine-Maritime	8th		Jean-Paul Lecoq	PCF	GDR
Seine-Maritime	9th		Marie-Agnès Poussier-Winsback	HOR	HOR
Seine-Maritime	10th		Robert Le Bourgeois	RN	RN
Seine-et-Marne	1st		Arnaud Saint-Martin	LFI	LFI-NFP
Seine-et-Marne	2nd		Frédéric Valletoux	HOR	HOR
Seine-et-Marne	3rd		Jean-Louis Thiériot	LR	DR
Seine-et-Marne	4th		Julien Limongi	RN	RN
Seine-et-Marne	5th		Franck Riester	RE	EPR
Seine-et-Marne	6th		Béatrice Roullaud	RN	RN
Seine-et-Marne	7th		Ersilia Soudais	LFI	LFI-NFP
Seine-et-Marne	8th		Arnaud Bonnet	LE	ECO
Seine-et-Marne	9th		Céline Thiébault-Martinez	PS	SOC
Seine-et-Marne	10th		Maxime Laisney	LFI	LFI-NFP
Seine-et-Marne	11th		Olivier Faure	PS	SOC
Seine-Saint-Denis	1st		Éric Coquerel	LFI	LFI-NFP
Seine-Saint-Denis	2nd		Stéphane Peu	PCF	GDR
Seine-Saint-Denis	3rd		Thomas Portes	LFI	LFI-NFP
Seine-Saint-Denis	4th		Soumya Bourouaha	PCF	GDR
Seine-Saint-Denis	5th		Aly Diouara	LFI	LFI-NFP
Seine-Saint-Denis	6th		Bastien Lachaud	LFI	LFI-NFP
Seine-Saint-Denis	7th		Alexis Corbière	LAP	ECO
Seine-Saint-Denis	8th		Fatiha Keloua-Hachi	PS	SOC
Seine-Saint-Denis	9th		Aurélie Trouvé	LFI	LFI-NFP
Seine-Saint-Denis	10th		Nadège Abomangoli	LFI	LFI-NFP
Seine-Saint-Denis	11th		Clémentine Autain	LAP	ECO
Seine-Saint-Denis	12th		Jérôme Legavre	POI	LFI-NFP
Somme	1st		François Ruffin	PD	ECO
Somme	2nd		Zahia Hamdane	LFI	LFI-NFP
Somme	3rd		Matthias Renault	RN	RN
Somme	4th		Jean-Philippe Tanguy	RN	RN
Somme	5th		Yaël Menache	RN	RN
Tarn	1st		Philippe Bonnecarrère	AC	EPR
Tarn	2nd		Karen Erodi	LFI	LFI-NFP
Tarn	3rd		Jean Terlier	RE	EPR
Tarn-et-Garonne	1st		Pierre-Henri Carbonnel*	UDR	UDR
Tarn-et-Garonne	2nd		Marine Hamelet	RN	RN
Territoire de Belfort	1st		Ian Boucard	LR	DR
Territoire de Belfort	2nd		Guillaume Bigot	RN	RN
Val-d'Oise	1st		Anne Sicard	IDL	RN
Val-d'Oise	2nd		Ayda Hadizadeh	PS	SOC
Val-d'Oise	3rd		Emmanuel Maurel	GRS	GDR
Val-d'Oise	4th		Naïma Moutchou	HOR	HOR
Val-d'Oise	5th		Paul Vannier	LFI	LFI-NFP
Val-d'Oise	6th		Gabrielle Cathala	LFI	LFI-NFP
Val-d'Oise	7th		Romain Eskenazi	PS	SOC
Val-d'Oise	8th		Carlos Martens Bilongo	LFI	LFI-NFP
Val-d'Oise	9th		Arnaud Le Gall	LFI	LFI-NFP
Val-d'Oise	10th		Aurélien Taché	LFI	LFI-NFP
Val-de-Marne	1st		Sylvain Berrios	LR	HOR
Val-de-Marne	2nd		Clémence Guetté	LFI	LFI-NFP
Val-de-Marne	3rd		Louis Boyard	LFI	LFI-NFP
Val-de-Marne	4th		Maud Petit	MoDem	DEM
Val-de-Marne	5th		Mathieu Lefèvre	RE	EPR
Val-de-Marne	6th		Guillaume Gouffier Valente	RE	EPR
Val-de-Marne	7th		Vincent Jeanbrun	LR	DR
Val-de-Marne	8th		Michel Herbillon	LR	DR
Val-de-Marne	9th		Isabelle Santiago	PS	SOC
Val-de-Marne	10th		Mathilde Panot	LFI	LFI-NFP
Val-de-Marne	11th		Sophie Taillé-Polian	G.s	ECO
Var	1st		Yannick Chenevard	RE	EPR
Var	2nd		Laure Lavalette	RN	RN
Var	3rd		Stéphane Rambaud	RN	RN
Var	4th		Philippe Lottiaux	RN	RN
Var	5th		Julie Lechanteux	RN	RN
Var	6th		Frank Giletti	RN	RN
Var	7th		Frédéric Boccaletti	RN	RN
Var	8th		Philippe Schreck	RN	RN
Vaucluse	1st		Raphaël Arnault	LFI	GDR
Vaucluse	2nd		Bénédicte Auzanot	RN	RN
Vaucluse	3rd		Hervé de Lépinau	RN	RN
Vaucluse	4th		Marie-France Lorho	RN	RN
Vaucluse	5th		Catherine Rimbert	RN	RN
Vendée	1st		Philippe Latombe	MoDem	DEM
Vendée	2nd		Béatrice Bellamy	HOR	HOR
Vendée	3rd		Stéphane Buchou	RE	EPR
Vendée	4th		Véronique Besse	DVD	NI
Vendée	5th		Pierre Henriet	HOR	HOR
Vienne	1st		Lisa Belluco	LE	ECO
Vienne	2nd		Sacha Houlié	PP	SOC
Vienne	3rd		Pascal Lecamp	MoDem	DEM
Vienne	4th		Nicolas Turquois	MoDem	DEM
Vosges	1st		Stéphane Viry	LR	DR
Vosges	2nd		Gaëtan Dussausaye	RN	RN
Vosges	3rd		Christophe Naegelen	UDI	LIOT
Vosges	4th		Sébastien Humbert	RN	RN
Wallis and Futuna	1st		Mikaele Seo	RE	EPR
Yonne	1st		Daniel Grenon	DLF	NI
Yonne	2nd		Sophie-Laurence Roy	RN	RN
Yonne	3rd		Julien Odoul	RN	RN
Yvelines	1st		Charles Rodwell	RE	EPR
Yvelines	2nd			MoDem	DEM
Yvelines	3rd		Béatrice Piron	RE	HOR
Yvelines	4th		Marie Lebec	RE	EPR
Yvelines	5th		Yaël Braun-Pivet	RE	EPR
Yvelines	6th		Natalia Pouzyreff	RE	EPR
Yvelines	7th		Aurélien Rousseau	PP	SOC
Yvelines	8th		Benjamin Lucas-Lundy	G.s	ECO
Yvelines	9th		Dieynaba Diop	PS	SOC
Yvelines	10th		Aurore Bergé	RE	EPR
Yvelines	11th		Laurent Mazaury	UDI	LIOT
Yvelines	12th		Karl Olive	RE	EPR
French residents overseas	1st		Christopher Weissberg*	RE	EPR
French residents overseas	2nd		Benoît Larrouquis*	RE	EPR
French residents overseas	3rd		Vincent Caure	RE	EPR
French residents overseas	4th		Pieyre-Alexandre Anglade	RE	EPR
French residents overseas	5th		Nathalie Coggia*	RE	EPR
French residents overseas	6th		Marc Ferracci	RE	EPR
French residents overseas	7th		Frédéric Petit	MoDem	DEM
French residents overseas	8th		Caroline Yadan	RE	EPR
French residents overseas	9th		Karim Ben Cheïkh	G.s	ECO
French residents overseas	10th		Amal Amélia Lakrafi	RE	EPR
French residents overseas	11th		Anne Genetet	RE	EPR
