= French Parliament =

Bicameral legislature of France

French Parliament Parlement français
- 17th legislature of the French Fifth Republic
- Diplomatic emblem of the French Republic

Type
- Type: Bicameral
- Houses: Senate; National Assembly

Leadership
- President of the Senate: Gérard Larcher, LR since 1 October 2014
- President of the National Assembly: Yaël Braun-Pivet, RE since 28 June 2022

Structure
- Seats: 925; 348 (Senate); 577 (National Assembly)
- Senate political groups: LR (124); UC (63); SER (62); CRCE-K (18); RDSE (18); RDPI (16); LIRT (15); GEST (15); UNT (15); RASNAG (2)
- National Assembly political groups: Government (Second Lecornu government) (211): EPR (92) (Note: Renaissance (87) (Note: RE-TdP (9)); DVD (2); PRV (1); GNC (1); Tapura (1)); LD (36) (Note: MoDem (33); Renaissance (2); RSM (1)); HOR (34) (Note: Horizons (26); LR (2); Renaissance (2); LC (1); DVD (1); AC (1); CCB (1)); Opposition (415): RN (123) (Note: RN (115); LAF (5); IDL (3)); LFI (71) (Note: LFI (67); NPA (1); REV (1); RÉ 974 (1); Péyi-A (1)); SOC (69) (Note: PS (64); PP (2); PPDG (1); EH Bai (1); Ex-Renaissance (1)); DR (49) (Note: LR (44); DVD (5)); E&S (38) (Note: LÉ (25); G.s (6); L'Après (4); GE (1); T44 (1); D! (1)); LIOT (22) (Note: UDI (6); R&PS (3) (Note: FeC (2); PNC (1)); LR (2); PS (2); DVD (2); DVG (2); PRV (1); LC (1); La Convention (1); AD (1); AHIP (1)); GDR (17) (Note: PCF (8); PLR (2); GRS (1); LP (1); Péyi-A (1); Tāvini (1); UC (1); MDES (1); PLD (1)); UDR (17); NI (9) (Note: LR (2); DVD (2); RN (2); Renaissance (1); AC (1); EC (1))

Elections
- Senate voting system: Indirect election
- National Assembly voting system: Two-round system
- Last Senate election: 27 September 2026
- Last National Assembly election: 30 June and 7 July 2024
- Next Senate election: By September 2029
- Next National Assembly election: By June 2029

Meeting place
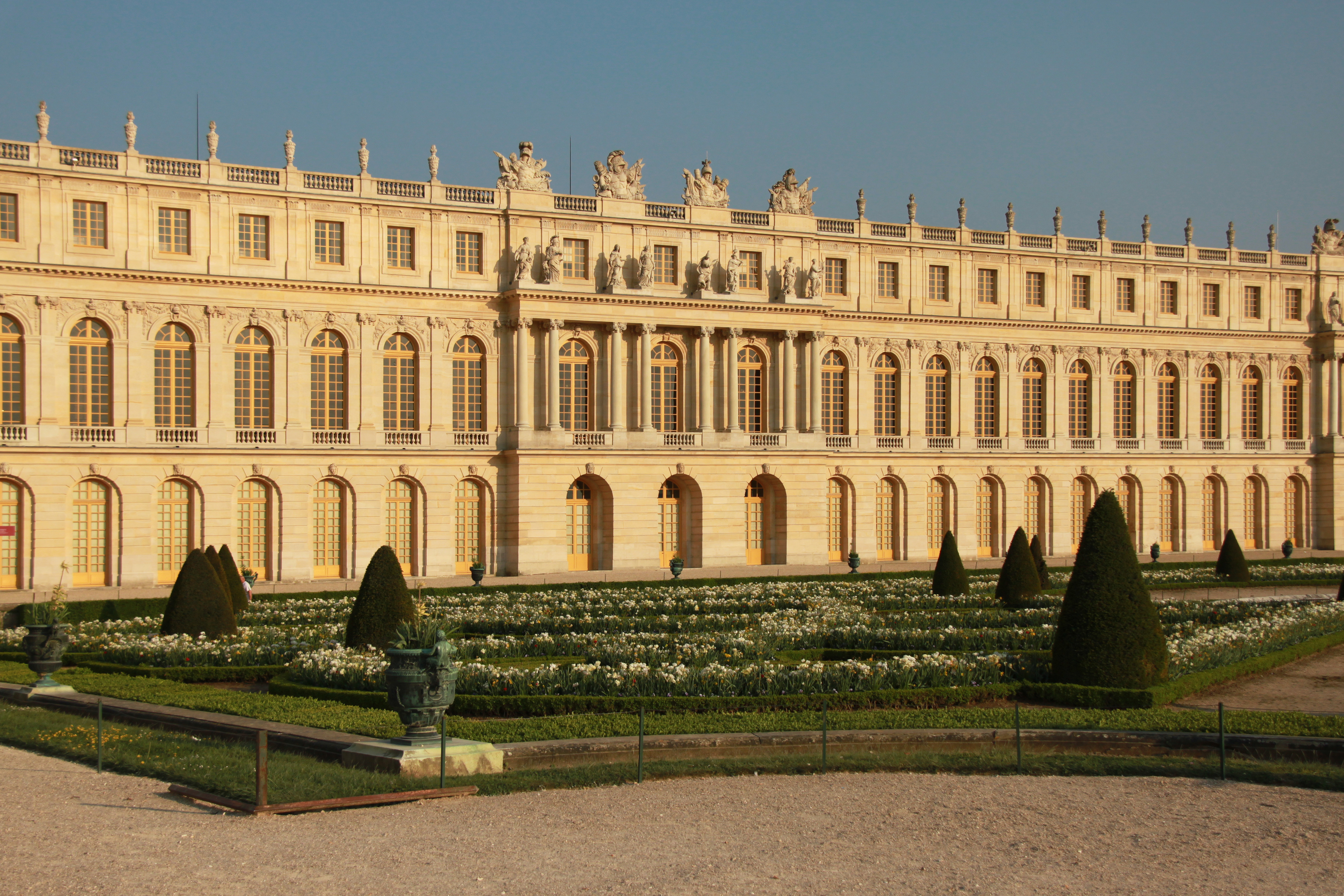
- Aile du Midi, Château de Versailles (joint session)
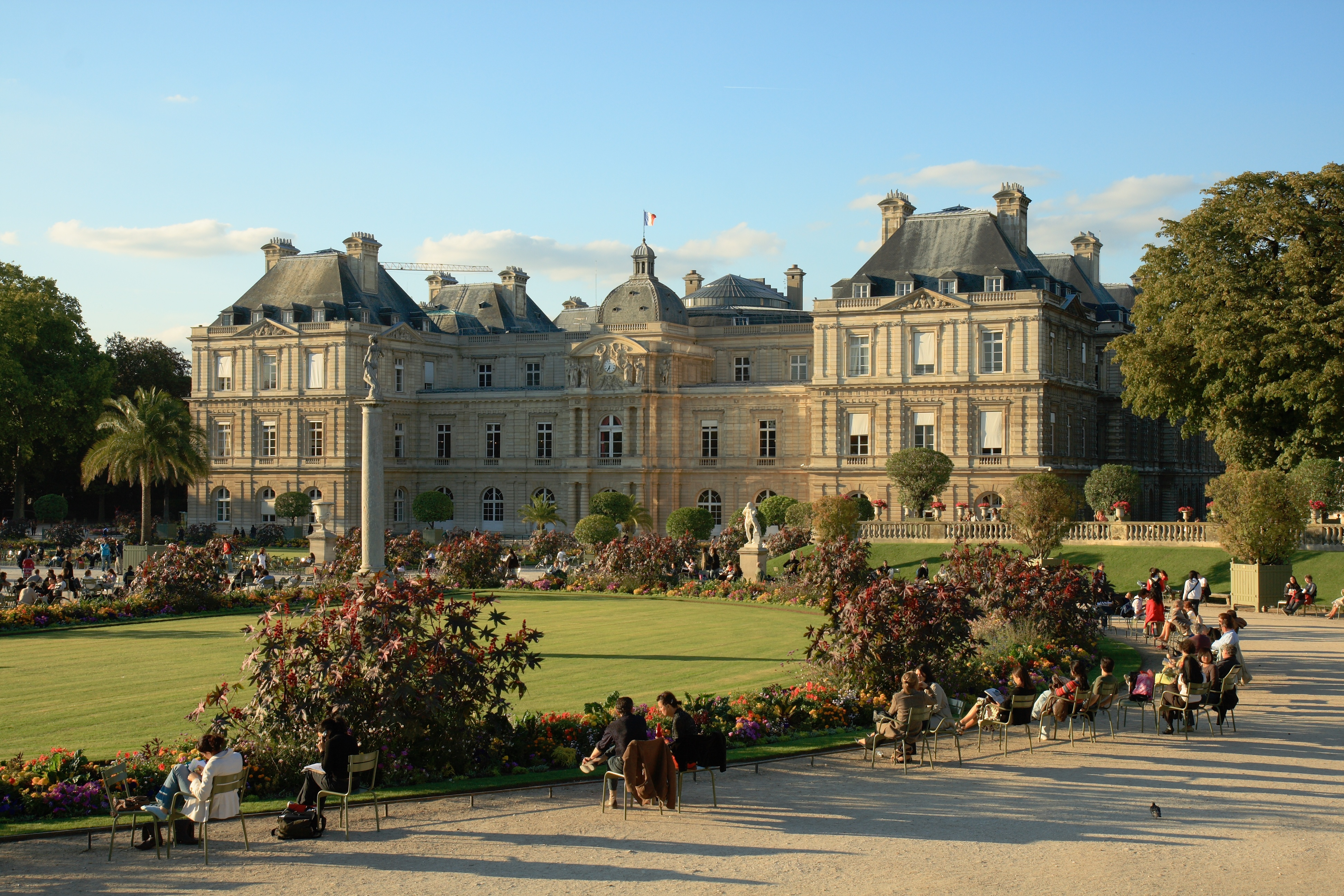
- Palais du Luxembourg, meeting place of the French Senate
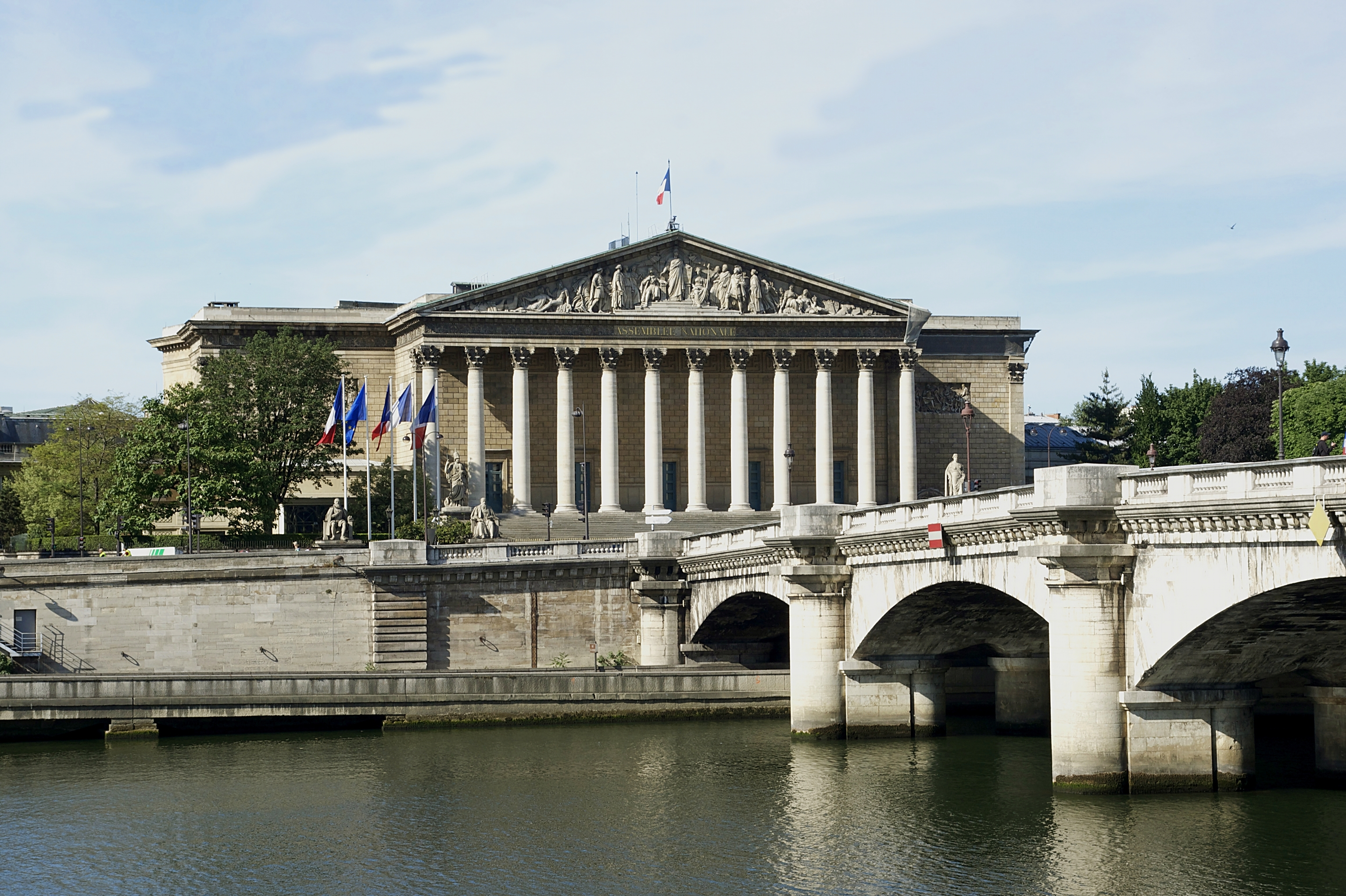
- Palais Bourbon, meeting place of the French National Assembly

Website
- parlement.fr

The French Parliament (French: Parlement français, [paʁləmɑ̃ fʁɑ̃sɛ]) is the bicameral parliament of the French Fifth Republic, consisting of the Senate (Sénat) and National Assembly (Assemblée nationale). Each assembly conducts legislative sessions at separate locations in Paris: the Senate meets in the Palais du Luxembourg, the National Assembly convenes at the Palais Bourbon, both on the Rive Gauche.

Each house has its own regulations and rules of procedure. However, occasionally they may meet as a single house known as the Congress of the French Parliament (Congrès du Parlement français), convened at the Palace of Versailles, to revise and amend the Constitution of France.

== History and name ==
The French Parliament, as a legislative body, should not be confused with the various parlements of the Ancien Régime in France, which were regional appeals courts with certain administrative functions varying from province to province and as to whether the local law was written and Roman, or customary common law.

The word "Parliament", in the modern meaning of the term, appeared in France in the 19th century, at the time of the constitutional monarchy of 1830–1848. It is never mentioned in any constitutional text until the Constitution of the 4th Republic in 1946. Before that time, reference was made to "les Chambres" or to each assembly, whatever its name, but unlike in Great Britain, the legislature as a whole had no name as such.

Across the varied constitutional structures used in France since 1791, all have had a legislative body of varying names, which has for most of its history been bicameral (though at times unicameralism and more unorthodox forms with three or more chambers have existed).

Date	Constitution	Upper chamber	Lower chamber	Other chamber	Joint sitting	Single chamber
1791	French Constitution of 1791					Assemblée législative
1793	French Constitution of 1793					Assemblée Nationale
1795–1799	Constitution of the Year III	Conseil des Anciens	Conseil des Cinq-Cents			
1799–1802	Constitution of the Year VIII	Sénat conservateur	Corps législatif	Tribunat		
1802–1804	Constitution of the Year X	Sénat conservateur	Corps législatif	Tribunat		
1804–1814	Constitution of the Year XII	Sénat conservateur	Corps législatif	Tribunat (Note: The Tribunate was abolished by a decree of the Senate in 1807, with its remaining functions and members absorbed into the Corps législatif.)		
1814–1815	Charter of 1814	Chamber of Peers	Chambre des députés des départements			
1815	Additional Act to the Constitutions of the Empire	Chamber of Peers	Chamber of Representatives			
1830–1848	Charter of 1830	Chamber of Peers	Chamber of Deputies			
1848–1852	French Constitution of 1848					Assemblée Nationale
1852–1870	French Constitution of 1852	Sénat	Corps législatif			
1871–1875						Assemblée Nationale
1875–1940	French Constitutional Laws of 1875	Sénat	Chamber of Deputies		Assemblée Nationale	
1940–1944	French Constitutional Law of 1940					
1944–1946	Provisional Government of the French Republic					Assemblée Nationale
1946–1958	French Constitution of 1946	Conseil de la République	Assemblée Nationale		Parliament	
since 1958	French Constitution of 1958	Sénat	Assemblée Nationale		Parlement réuni en Congrès	

== Election of representatives ==
The current Parliament is composed of two chambers: the Senate (French: le Sénat) and the National Assembly, which have 348 and 577 members respectively.

Deputies, who sit in the National Assembly, are elected by first past the post voting in two rounds for a term of five years, notwithstanding a dissolution of the Assembly. Each constituency has around 100,000 residents, though some variance of size exists between rural and urban constituencies. For example, the Val-d'Oise constituency has 188,000 electors, while Saint-Pierre-et-Miquelon near Canada has just 6,000.

Senators are elected by indirect universal suffrage by the grands électeurs, who consist of deputies, regional councillors, departmental councillors and representatives of municipal councillors. The latter constitute 95% of the electoral body.

== Organization and powers ==
Normally, the parliament meets for a single nine-month session each year but under special circumstances the President of France can call an additional session. Parliamentary power was limited after the establishment of the Fifth Republic; however, the National Assembly can still cause a government to fall if an absolute majority of the legislators votes for a motion of no confidence. As a result, the government usually consists of members from the political party that dominates the Assembly and must be supported by a majority there to prevent a vote of no-confidence.

The Prime Minister and other government Ministers are appointed by the President, who is under no constitutional or other mandatory obligation to make governmental appointments from the ranks of the majority party in parliament. This is a safeguard that was introduced by the founder of the Fifth Republic, Charles de Gaulle, to attempt to prevent the disarray and horse-trading seen in the parliamentary regimes of the Third and Fourth Republics; however, in practice the prime minister and other ministers usually do belong to the majority party. A notable exception to this custom occurred during Nicolas Sarkozy's premiership when he appointed socialist ministers and Secretary of State-level junior ministers to his government. The rare periods during which the president is not from the same political party as the prime minister are usually known as cohabitation. The Cabinet of Ministers is led by the President rather than the Prime Minister.

The government (or, when it sits in session every Wednesday, the cabinet) exerts considerable influence on the agenda of Parliament. The government can link its term to a legislative text which it proposes, and unless a motion of censure is introduced within 24 hours of the proposal and passed within 48 hours of introduction – thus full procedures last at most 72 hours – the text is considered adopted without a vote. However, this procedure was limited by a 2008 constitutional amendment. Legislative initiative rests with the National Assembly.

Legislators enjoy parliamentary immunity. Both assemblies have committees that write reports on a variety of topics. If necessary, they can establish parliamentary commissions of inquiry with broad investigative power. However, this is almost never exercised because the majority can reject a proposition by the opposition to create an investigatory commission. Also, such a commission may only be created if it does not interfere with a judicial investigation, meaning that in order to cancel its creation, one just needs to press charges on the topic concerned by the investigatory commission. Since 2008, the opposition may impose the creation of an investigative commission once a year, even against the wishes of the majority. However, they still cannot lead investigations if there is a judicial case in process already (or that starts after the commission is formed).

== See also ==
- Constitution of France
- Government of France
- History of France
- Politics of France
- Deputy (France)
- Opposition day
- List of French legislatures
- President of the Senate (France)
