= Bayrou government =

Government of France between December 2024 and September 2025

- 46th Government of French Fifth Republic
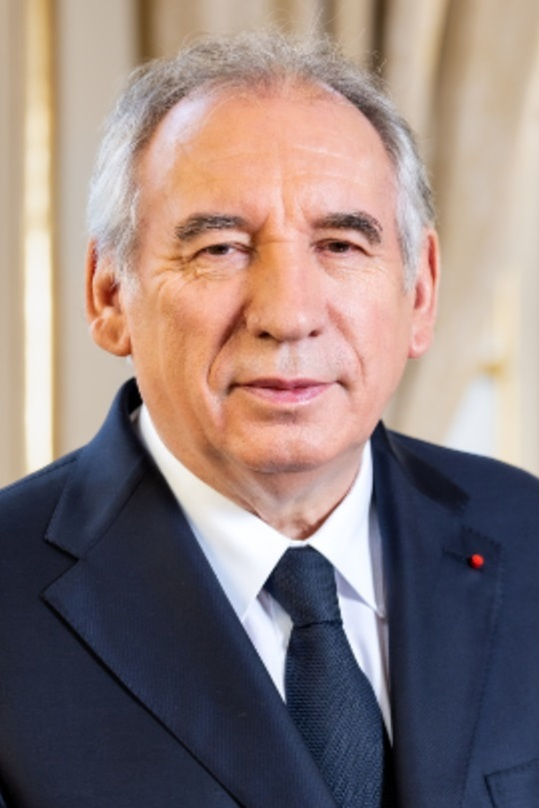
- Date formed: 13 December 2024
- Date dissolved: 9 September 2025

People and organisations
- President of the Republic: Emmanuel Macron
- Prime Minister: François Bayrou
- No. of ministers: 35 (Note: Does not include the Prime Minister.)
- Member parties: RE; LR; MoDem; HOR; UDI; PR
- Status in legislature: Minority (Coalition)

History
- Election: 2024 French legislative election
- Predecessor: Barnier government
- Successor: Lecornu governments

The Bayrou government (French: gouvernement Bayrou) was the forty-sixth government of France. It was formed in December 2024 after President Emmanuel Macron appointed François Bayrou as Prime Minister on 13 December, replacing caretaker Michel Barnier (who had been removed from office by a motion of no-confidence).

François Bayrou was the fourth prime minister to hold the office in a single year, the most in the history of the Fifth Republic.

The government included members of Emmanuel Macron's coalition, Ensemble, as well as The Republicans; despite its minority status, it survived a vote of no confidence on 16 January 2025 thanks to abstentions from the National Rally and the Socialist Party.

The government was defeated in a confidence vote on 8 September 2025 in the National Assembly, with 364 deputies voting against confidence and 194 deputies voting in favour of confidence.

== Formation ==
=== Background ===
==== Barnier government ====
Following gains by opposition parties in the legislative elections called by President Emmanuel Macron in the summer of 2024, Gabriel Attal resigned. Macron initially refused his resignation but accepted it on 16 July. On 5 September, Barnier was appointed as prime minister by Macron.

Barnier was faced with a National Assembly divided nearly evenly into three blocs: the left-wing New Popular Front with a plurality of seats, Macron's centrist to centre-right Ensemble, and the far-right National Rally.

On 2 December 2024, Barnier invoked article 49.3 of the French Constitution to adopt the Social Security budget for 2025 without submitting it to a parliamentary vote, prompting both the New Popular Front and the National Rally to file motions of no confidence against his government. On 4 December, three months into his tenure, the Barnier government collapsed by a vote of no confidence in National Assembly in a 331–244 vote.

==== Searching for a new Prime Minister ====
Prime Minister Michel Barnier then presented his government's resignation in the evening to the President of the Republic, who accepted it. He ensured that current affairs were handled with the government pending the formation of a new government from 6 to 13 December.

After the resignation of the Barnier government, negotiations took place between the President of the Republic and the various parliamentary groups, with the exception of the LFI, RN and UDR. These discussions led Olivier Faure, First Secretary of the Socialist Party, to consider a non-censorship agreement on the condition that the Prime Minister be left-wing.

Over the course of a week, various candidates were considered for the position of Prime Minister, including Bernard Cazeneuve, Sebastien Lecornu, François Villeroy de Galhau, François Baroin, Roland Lescure and François Bayrou.

=== Bayrou's appointment ===
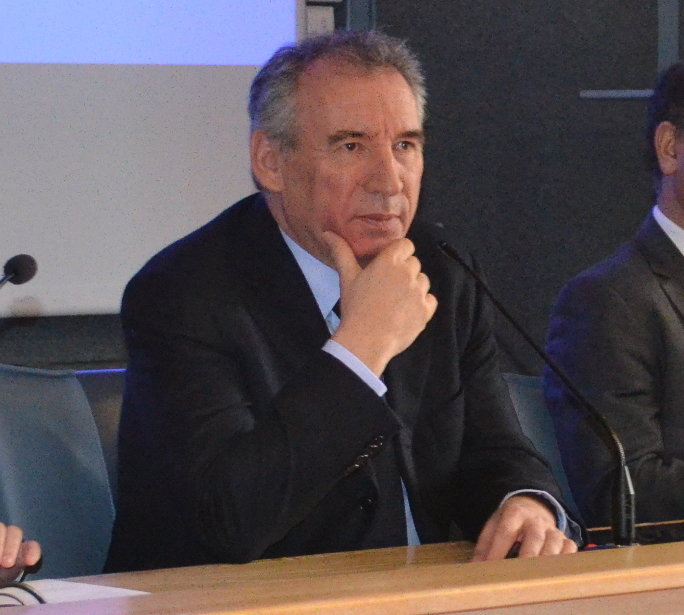
Bayrou in 2017

After being rejected the day before on 12 December, Bayrou met the President at the Élysée the following morning. At the end of a long, heated discussion (with fears of a break with the MoDem), Emmanuel Macron finally appointed him Prime Minister on 13 December 2024. At 73 years old, he is the second oldest serving prime minister, after Michel Barnier, to come to power. He is also considered a loyal supporter of President Macron, whom he supported in 2017 presidential election. He was nominated Minister of State and Justice in the first Philippe Government, between May and June 2017.

François Bayrou was supported by the Macronist bloc, while being rejected by La France Insoumise, while the other left-wing parties and the far right were awaiting the measures taken by the Prime Minister.

Bayrou, in his speech, recalled the importance of social justice, republicanism, national reconciliation, the need to overcome a serious crisis that is ravaging Europe and France, and thanked Barnier for his work as prime minister. The case of corruption for embezzlement of European funds, of which Bayrou was acquitted in autumn 2023 due to lack of evidence, was widely reported in the media.

The Socialist Party, in a letter to the new prime minister, asked him to give up applying article 49.3 of the Constitution in exchange for no censure, announced that socialists members "will not participate in government and will therefore remain in opposition in Parliament", and blamed the President for "aggravating the political crisis".

== Collapse ==
In the summer of 2025, Bayrou presented his budget plans, which were met with strong criticism from all elements of the political spectrum except for the Macron-affiliated parties. As several political forces began threatening to withdraw support, Bayrou refused to negotiate and instead called for a vote of confidence in his government under Article 49.1, which he lost.

Bayrou's replacement as prime minister was Sébastien Lecornu of the Renaissance party.

Question of confidence
Ballot →	8 September 2025
Required majority →	280 out of 573 ✗
Votes in favour: • ER (90); • LD (36); • HOR (34); • DR (27); • LIOT (4); • NI (3)	194 / 573
Votes against: • RN (123); • LFI (71); • SOC (66); • ECO (38); • GDR (17); • UDR (15); • LIOT (15); • DR (13); • NI (6)	364 / 573
Abstentions: • DR (9); • LIOT (4); • ER (1); • NI (1)	15 / 573

== Composition ==
=== Ministers ===
Portfolio	Name	Party
Prime Minister	François Bayrou	MoDem
Minister of State, Minister of National Education, Higher Education and Research	Élisabeth Borne	RE
Minister of State, Minister of the Overseas	Manuel Valls	RE
Minister of State, Minister of Justice	Gérald Darmanin	RE
Minister of State, Minister of the Interior	Bruno Retailleau	LR
Minister of Labour, Health, Solidarity and Families	Catherine Vautrin	RE
Minister of Economy, Finance, Industrial and Digital Sovereignty	Éric Lombard	SE
Minister of the Armed Forces	Sébastien Lecornu	RE
Minister for Culture	Rachida Dati	LR
Minister for Territorial Development and Decentralisation	François Rebsamen	FP
Minister for Europe and Foreign Affairs	Jean-Noël Barrot	MoDem
Minister of Ecological Transition, Biodiversity, Forest, Sea and Fishing	Agnès Pannier-Runacher	RE
Minister of Agriculture and Food Sovereignty	Annie Genevard	LR
Minister of Public Action, Civil Service and Simplification	Laurent Marcangeli	HOR
Minister of Sports, Youth and Community Life	Marie Barsacq	SE

=== Deputy Ministers ===
Portfolio	Attached minister	Name	Party
Minister Delegate for Relations with Parliament	Prime Minister	Patrick Mignola	MoDem
Minister Delegate for Gender Equality and the Fight against discriminations	Prime Minister	Aurore Bergé	RE
Minister Delegate, Spokesperson of the Government	Prime Minister	Sophie Primas	LR
Minister Delegate for Higher Education and Research	Minister of State, Minister of National Education, Higher Education and Research	Philippe Baptiste	SE
Minister Delegate	Minister of State, Minister of the Interior	François-Noël Buffet	LR
Minister Delegate for Labour and Employment	Minister of Labour, Health, Solidarity and Families	Astrid Panosyan-Bouvet	RE
Minister Delegate for Health and Access to Care	Minister of Labour, Health, Solidarity and Families	Yannick Neuder	LR
Minister Delegate for Autonomy and Persons with Disabilities	Minister of Labour, Health, Solidarity and Families	Charlotte Parmentier-Lecocq	HOR
Minister Delegate for Public Accounts	Minister of Economy, Finance, Industrial and Digital Sovereignty	Amélie de Montchalin	RE
Minister Delegate for Industry and Energy	Minister of Economy, Finance, Industrial and Digital Sovereignty	Marc Ferracci	RE
Minister Delegate for Trade, Crafts, Small and Medium Enterprises, Social and Solidarity Economy	Minister of Economy, Finance, Industrial and Digital Sovereignty	Véronique Louwagie	LR
Minister Delegate for Artificial Intelligence and Digital Technologies	Minister of Economy, Finance, Industrial and Digital Sovereignty	Clara Chappaz	SE
Minister Delegate for Tourism	Minister of Economy, Finance, Industrial and Digital Sovereignty	Nathalie Delattre	PR
Minister Delegate for Memory and Veteran Affairs	Minister of the Armed Forces	Patricia Mirallès	RE
Minister Delegate for Housing	Minister for Territorial Development and Decentralisation	Valérie Létard	UDI
Minister Delegate for Transport	Minister for Territorial Development and Decentralisation	Philippe Tabarot	LR
Minister Delegate for Rural Affairs	Minister for Territorial Development and Decentralisation	Françoise Gatel	UDI
Minister Delegate for the City	Minister for Territorial Development and Decentralisation	Juliette Méadel	SE
Minister Delegate for Europe	Minister for Europe and Foreign Affairs	Benjamin Haddad	RE
Minister Delegate for Foreign Trade and French Abroad	Minister for Europe and Foreign Affairs	Laurent Saint-Martin	RE
Minister Delegate for Francophonie and International Partnerships	Minister for Europe and Foreign Affairs	Thani Mohamed Soilihi	RE
