= Lecornu governments =

Government of France since 2025

- 47th and 48th Governments of French Fifth Republic
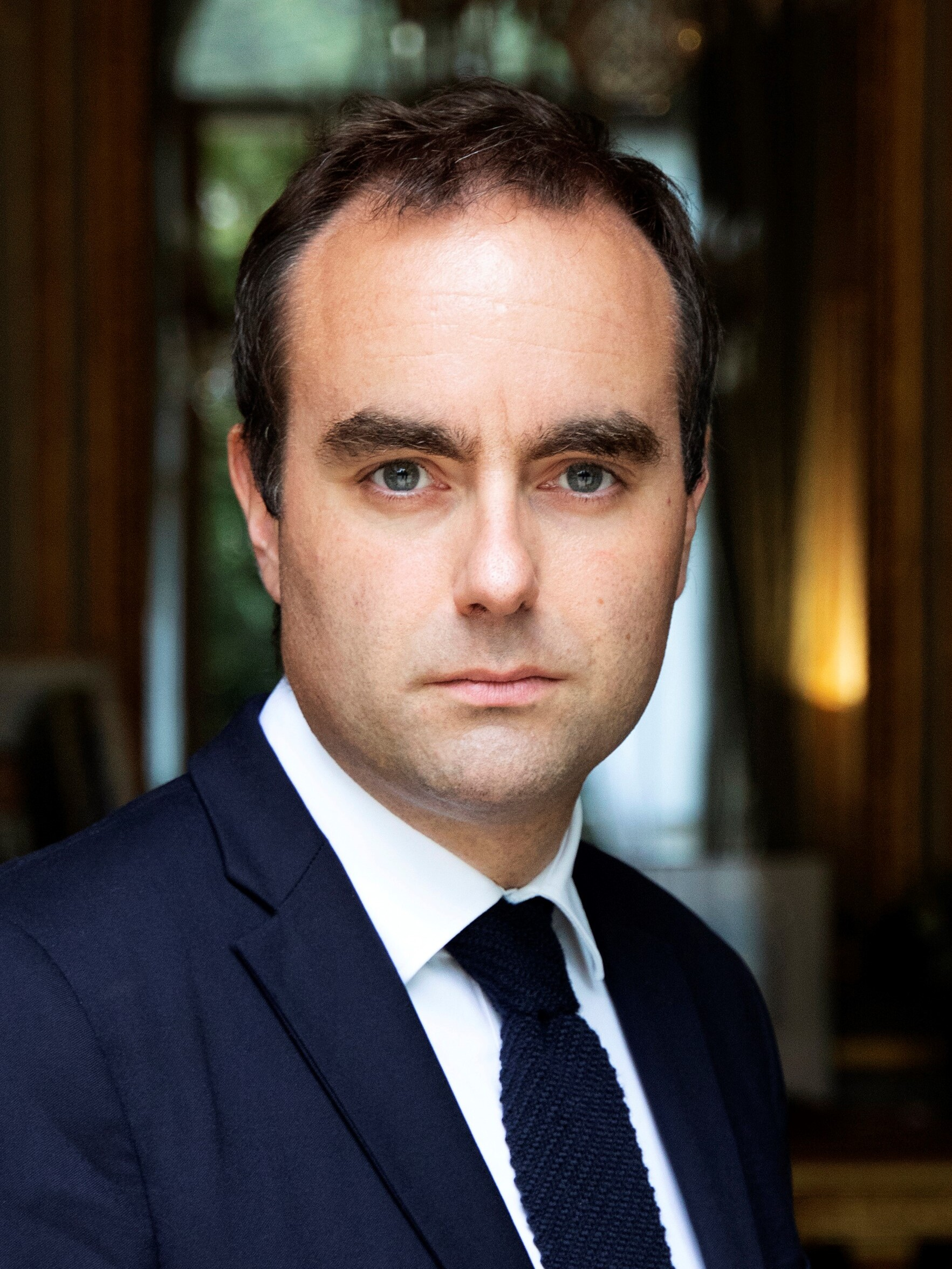
- Date formed: First: 9 September 2025 (Note: The whole cabinet was formed on 5 October, but Lecornu himself was sworn in as Prime Minister on 9 September.); Second: 10 October 2025
- Date dissolved: First: 10 October 2025 (Note: Lecornu tendered his resignation to President Macron on 6 October 2025, but remained caretaker Prime Minister until he was recommissioned on 10 October 2025.); Second: Incumbent

People and organisations
- President of the Republic: Emmanuel Macron
- Prime Minister: Sébastien Lecornu
- Member parties: RE; LR (until 2025); MoDem; HOR
- Status in legislature: Minority (coalition)

History
- Election: 2024 French legislative election
- Predecessor: Bayrou government

The first Lecornu government (French: gouvernement Lecornu I) was the forty-seventh government of France. It was formed in September 2025 after President Emmanuel Macron appointed Sébastien Lecornu as Prime Minister on 9 September, replacing François Bayrou, who had been removed from office by a failed motion of confidence. The list of ministers was announced on 5 October.

Lecornu resigned less than 14 hours after presenting his cabinet on 6 October, 27 days after his appointment, making his first government the shortest-lived one in French history. On 10 October, Lecornu was re-appointed as Prime Minister. He then formed the second Lecornu government (French: gouvernement Lecornu II), the 48th and incumbent government of France.

== Formation ==
=== First government ===
On 9 September 2025, President Emmanuel Macron appointed Lecornu as Prime Minister following the fall of the Bayrou government. After 26 days, the composition of the government was announced on 5 October, with most of the ministers retaining their portfolios from the Bayrou government. As well as the continuing ministers, some other deputies from President Macron's Ensemble coalition were added, with former ministers Eric Woerth and Bruno Le Maire receiving portfolios again. Out of 18 nominations, 4 are members of The Republicans, and 8 of them are former ministers from the more right-leaning factions of the Ensemble coalition. Despite this, Bruno Retailleau retaining the Ministry of the Interior, declared the same evening that the composition of the government "doesn't reflect the break" desired by The Republicans, who demanded a third of the ministries.

Shortly after the nomination, the various leaders of the left-wing parties making up the New Popular Front expressed their outrage against the new cabinet: Fabien Roussel (French Communist Party) called it a "middle finger to the French" whilst Jean-Luc Mélenchon described it as a "parade of LR and former LR revenants"; Marine Tondelier (Les Écologistes) described the nominations as a "bonus for incompetence" and a "contempt for democracy", and Olivier Faure (Socialist Party) spoke of it as a complete "Panini album of the Sarkozy/Fillon government". For the far-right, Jordan Bardella (National Rally) criticised the composition of the government, whilst Éric Ciotti (Union of the Right for the Republic) also invoked the image of a "middle finger".

==== Resignation ====
On 6 October 2025, Prime Minister Lecornu and his cabinet resigned just one day after being formally appointed by President Emmanuel Macron. The resignation came amid widespread political backlash over the composition of the new government, which included several figures closely associated with Macron's previous administrations, and escalating tensions with The Republicans, led by Bruno Retailleau. Lecornu had pledged to avoid using Article 49.3 of the French Constitution to push the 2026 budget through Parliament, instead advocating for a negotiated compromise. He also faced criticism for proposing a scaled-down version of the planned "Zucman tax" on wealth, limited to certain financial holdings. In his resignation statement, Lecornu cited the "absence of conditions necessary to govern" in a fragmented parliament. Following his departure, opposition parties called for early legislative elections, and reports suggested that President Macron was considering dissolving the National Assembly. The Lecornu government became the shortest in French history, lasting only 14 hours between the appointment of its ministers and its resignation. It notably beat the previous records held by Frédéric François-Marsal in 1924, Édouard Herriot in 1926, and Henri Queuille in 1950, which all only lasted two days before resigning or being removed by Parliament.

=== Re-appointment and reactions ===
Macron reappointed Lecornu as Prime Minister on 10 October. La France Insoumise's Manuel Bompard said that he considered the reappointment humiliating and vowed to impeach President Macron and file a motion of no confidence against Lecornu's second government. The French Communist Party's Fabien Roussel called for a snap election. The Ecologists, along with La France Insoumise and the French Communist Party, announced that they would support the motion. The Socialist Party's Pierre Jouvet said that a motion of no confidence was not ruled out because no agreement was reached with the government.

The Republicans and the Union of Democrats and Independents said they would not join the coalition. As a result, ministers appointed by Lecornu from The Republicans were expelled from the party. National Rally's Jordan Bardella deemed the reappointment shameful for France and democracy, saying that the National Rally would file a motion of no confidence. The Union of the Right for the Republic's Éric Ciotti would support the motion. He called on his former right-wing colleagues to join him to bring about great change, and welcomed them like a family.

== Motions of no confidence ==
=== October 2025 ===
La France Insoumise and the National Rally filed separate motions of no confidence on 16 October 2025. The government survived both separate motions, primarily because the Socialist Party supported the government after it promised to roll back pension reforms.

Motion of no confidence
Ballot →	16 October 2025
Required majority →	289 out of 577 ✗ 18
Votes in favour: • RN (123); • LFI (71); • ECO (35); • UDR (16); • GDR (15); • SOC (7); • NI (2); • LIOT (1); • DR (1)	271 / 577
Abstentions or absentees (Note: In the French National Assembly, motions of no confidence are voted on by open ballot, with only those in favor of the motion taking part in the vote. Since a majority of the entire membership is required, those who are absent or do not cast a ballot are de facto voting against.)	306 / 577

Motion of no confidence
Ballot →	16 October 2025
Required majority →	289 out of 577 ✗ 145
Votes in favour: • RN (123); • UDR (16); • DR (3); • NI (2)	144 / 577
Abstentions or absentees	433 / 577

=== January 2026 ===
In protest of the EU–Mercosur Partnership Agreement, La France Insoumise and the National Rally again filed separate motions of no confidence on 9 January 2026. The government survived both votes due to the support of the Socialist Party.

Motion of no confidence
Ballot →	14 January 2026
Required majority →	288 out of 575 ✗ 32
Votes in favour: • RN (121); • LFI (71); • ECO (32); • UDR (16); • GDR (13); • NI (3)	256 / 575
Abstentions or absentees	319 / 575

Motion of no confidence
Ballot →	14 January 2026
Required majority →	288 out of 575 ✗ 146
Votes in favour: • RN (122); • UDR (16); • NI (3); • DR (1)	142 / 575
Abstentions or absentees	433 / 575

== Composition ==
=== Ministers ===
==== First Lecornu government ====
Portfolio	Name	Party
Prime Minister	Sébastien Lecornu	RE
Minister of State, Minister of National Education, Higher Education and Research	Élisabeth Borne	RE
Minister of State, Minister of the Overseas	Manuel Valls	RE
Minister of State, Minister of Justice	Gérald Darmanin	RE
Minister of State, Minister of the Interior	Bruno Retailleau	LR
Minister of the Armed Forces and Veterans Affairs	Bruno Le Maire (Note: Until 6 October 2025.)	RE
Minister of the Armed Forces and Veterans Affairs	Sébastien Lecornu (Note: Interim from 6 October 2025.)	RE
Minister of Labour, Health, Solidarity and Families, Autonomy and Persons with Disabilities	Catherine Vautrin	RE
Minister for Culture	Rachida Dati	LR
Minister of Economy, Finance, Industrial and Digital Sovereignty	Roland Lescure	RE
Minister for Europe and Foreign Affairs	Jean-Noël Barrot	MoDem
Minister for Territorial Development and Decentralisation and Housing	Éric Woerth	RE
Minister of Ecological Transition, Biodiversity, Forest, Sea and Fishing	Agnès Pannier-Runacher	RE
Minister of Agriculture and Food Sovereignty	Annie Genevard	LR
Minister of Public Accounts	Amélie de Montchalin	RE
Minister of Public Action, Civil Service and Simplification, Artificial Intelligence and Digital	Naïma Moutchou	HOR
Minister of Transport	Philippe Tabarot	LR
Minister of Sports, Youth and Community Life	Marina Ferrari	MoDem

==== Second Lecornu government ====
Portfolio	Name	Party
Prime Minister	Sébastien Lecornu	RE
Minister of National Education	Édouard Geffray	Ind
Minister for Overseas Territories	Naïma Moutchou	HOR
Minister of Justice	Gérald Darmanin	RE
Minister of the Interior	Laurent Nuñez	RE
Minister of the Armed Forces	Catherine Vautrin	RE
Minister of Labour, Employment and Economic Inclusion	Jean-Pierre Farandou	Ind
Minister of Culture	Rachida Dati	DVD (Note: On 10 October, The Republicans voted not to participate in Lecornu's second government. As a result, the appointed ministers were suspended from the party.)
Minister of Culture	Catherine Pégard	Ind
Minister of Economics, Finance and Industrial and Digital Sovereignty	Roland Lescure	RE
Minister of Health, Families, Autonomy and People with Disabilities	Stéphanie Rist	RE
Minister for Europe and Foreign Affairs	Jean-Noël Barrot	MoDem
Minister of Partnership with Territories and Decentralization	Françoise Gatel	UDI
Minister of Housing and Urban Renovation	Vincent Jeanbrun	DVD
Minister of Ecological Transition	Monique Barbut	Ind
Minister of Agriculture	Annie Genevard	DVD
Minister for Public Action and Accounts	Amélie de Montchalin	RE
Minister for Public Action and Accounts	David Amiel	RE
Minister of Transport	Philippe Tabarot	DVD
Minister of Sports, Youth and Community Life	Marina Ferrari	MoDem
Minister of Higher Education, Research and Space	Philippe Baptiste	Ind
Minister of Small and Medium-sized Enterprises, Trade, Crafts, Tourism and Purchasing Power	Serge Papin	Ind

=== Deputy Ministers ===
==== First Lecornu government ====
Portfolio	Attached minister	Name	Party
Minister Delegate for Gender Equality and the Fight against discriminations	Prime Minister	Aurore Bergé	RE
Minister Delegate for Relations with Parliament	Prime Minister	Mathieu Lefèvre	RE

==== Second Lecornu government ====
Portfolio	Attached minister	Name	Party
Minister Delegate for Relations with Parliament	Prime Minister	Laurent Panifous	DVG
Spokesperson of the Government of France	Prime Minister	Maud Bregeon	RE
Minister Delegate for Gender Equality and the Fight against discriminations	Prime Minister	Aurore Bergé	RE
Minister Delegate to the Minister of the Interior	Minister of the Interior	Marie-Pierre Vedrenne	MoDem
Minister Delegate to the Minister of the Armed Forces	Minister of the Armed Forces	Alice Rufo	Ind
Minister Delegate for the Sea and Fisheries	Minister of Ecological Transition	Catherine Chabaud	MoDem
Minister Delegate for the Ecological Transition	Minister of Ecological Transition	Mathieu Lefèvre	RE
Minister Delegate for Industry	Minister of the Economy	Sébastien Martin	DVD
Minister Delegate for Artificial Intelligence and Digital	Minister of the Economy	Anne Le Hénanff	HOR
Minister Delegate for Europe	Minister for Europe and Foreign Affairs	Benjamin Haddad	RE
Minister Delegate for Foreign Trade and Attractiveness	Minister for Europe and Foreign Affairs	Nicolas Forissier	DVD
Minister Delegate for Francophonie, International Partnerships and the French Abroad	Minister for Europe and Foreign Affairs	Éléonore Caroit	RE
Minister Delegate for Autonomy and Persons with Disabilities	Minister for Health, Families, Autonomy and People with Disabilities	Charlotte Parmentier-Lecocq	HOR
Minister Delegate for Rural Affairs	Minister for Regional Planning and Decentralisation	Michel Fournier (Note: Until 22 September 2026.)	Ind
Minister Delegate for the Civil Service and State Reform	Minister for Public Action and Accounts	David Amiel (Note: Until 22 February 2026.)	RE
