= List of French legislatures =

This is a list of sittings of the French Parliament.

== List ==
- 1st legislature of the French Fifth Republic
- 2nd legislature of the French Fifth Republic
- 3rd legislature of the French Fifth Republic
- 4th legislature of the French Fifth Republic
- 5th legislature of the French Fifth Republic
- 6th legislature of the French Fifth Republic
- 7th legislature of the French Fifth Republic
- 8th legislature of the French Fifth Republic
- 9th legislature of the French Fifth Republic
- 10th legislature of the French Fifth Republic
- 11th legislature of the French Fifth Republic
- 12th legislature of the French Fifth Republic
- 13th legislature of the French Fifth Republic
- 14th legislature of the French Fifth Republic
- 15th legislature of the French Fifth Republic
- 16th legislature of the French Fifth Republic
- 17th legislature of the French Fifth Republic (current)

== See also ==
- List of French MPs
- List of legislatures by country
