= Michel Fournier (politician) =

French politician (born 1950)

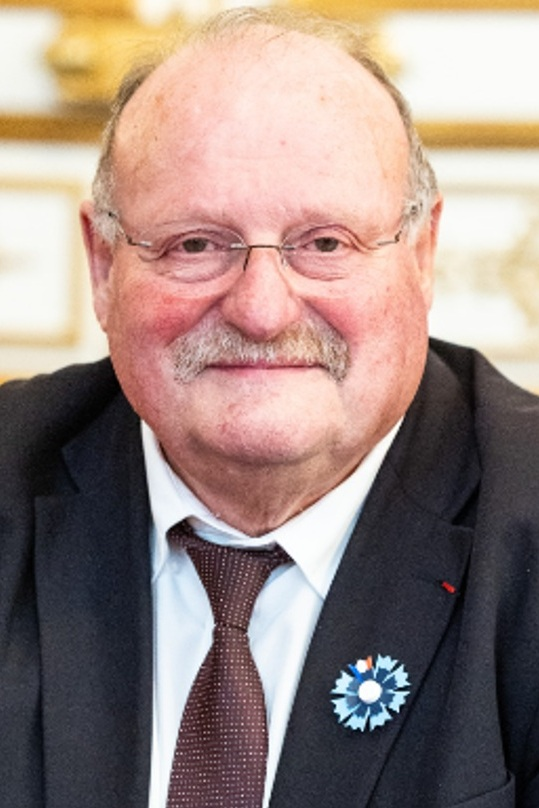
- Fournier in 2025

Minister Delegate for Rural Affairs
- Incumbent
- Assumed office 10 October 2025
- Prime Minister: Sébastien Lecornu
- Preceded by: Office established

Mayor of Les Voivres
- Incumbent
- Assumed office 1989

Personal details
- Born: Michel Louis Émile Fournier; 11 January 1950 (age 76) Châtel-sur-Moselle, France
- Party: Independent

Michel Louis Émile Fournier (French pronunciation: [miʃɛl fuʁnje]; born 11 January 1950) is a French politician who has served as Minister Delegate for Rural Affairs in the second government of Prime Minister Sébastien Lecornu since 12 October 2025. He has been mayor of Les Voivres, Vosges since 1989. Fournier left secondary school without a diploma. He is the first minister from the department of Vosges since 2002.

== Honours ==
- Knight of the Legion of Honour (2021)
