= Non-Attached Members (France) =

Parliament members not belonging to any group in the Western European country

The Non-Attached Members (French: députés non-inscrits; NI) are the deputies who are not members or related to any parliamentary group of the National Assembly of France.

== 17th legislature ==
=== Deputies by party ===
Party	Number of deputies
Miscellaneous far-right	2
Agir	1
Centrist Alliance	1
Du courage	1
New Energy	1
En Commun	1
Régions et Peuples Solidaires	1
Debout la France	1

=== List of non-attached deputies ===
Last name	Party	Constituency	Notes
Daniel Grenon	DLF	Yonne's 1st constituency	A former member of the National Rally (RN), having been expelled in 2024 following racist remarks he made. Joined Debout la France (DLF) in 2026.
Sandra Delannoy	EXD	Nord's 3rd constituency	
Christine Engrand	EXD	Pas-de-Calais's 6th constituency	A former member of the National Rally, excluded for six months in 2025 because of her "non-regulatory expenses" of several thousand euros, as well as its non-appearance at a group convocation.
Raphaël Schellenberger	LR	Haut-Rhin's 2nd constituency	
Lionel Vuibert	Agir	Ardennes's 1st constituency	Won a by-election caused by the resignation of National Rally Deputy Flavien Termet
Philippe Bonnecarrère	AC	Tarn's 1st constituency	
Aurélien Pradié	DC	Lot's 1st constituency	Former member of The Republicans who was dismissed from the party after failing to support President Emmanuel Macron's plan to raise the retirement age.
Véronique Besse	NÉ	Vendée's 4th constituency	Joined New Energy on 16 October 2025.
Stella Dupont	EC	Maine-et-Loire's 2nd constituency	Former member of the Together for the Republic group who left over the group's tax policy which she describes as right-wing.
Sophie Errante	R&PS	Loire-Atlantique's 10th constituency	A former Renaissance who left her party over the increasingly right-wing positions it was taking.

== 16th legislature ==
=== Deputies by party ===
Party	Number of deputies
Miscellaneous left	1
La France Insoumise	1
Divers droite	1
Debout la France	1
Miscellaneous far right	1

Last name	Party	Constituency	Notes
David Habib	DVG	Pyrénées-Atlantiques's 3rd constituency	
Adrien Quatennens	LFI	Nord's 1st constituency	
Véronique Besse	DVD	Vendée's 4th constituency	
Nicolas Dupont-Aignan	DLF	Essonne's 8th constituency	President of Debout la France
Emmanuelle Menard	EXD	Hérault's 6th constituency	

== 15th legislature ==
In the 15th legislature of the French Fifth Republic, National Rally MPs sat in this group.

=== Deputies by party ===
Party name / Category	Abbreviation	Number of deputies
National Rally	RN	6
The New Democrats	ND	5
Debout la France	DLF	2
Ecology Generation	GÉ	2
League of the South	LS	1
Miscellaneous centre	DVC	5
Miscellaneous right	DVD	1
Far-right	EXD	1
