= Alice Rufo =

French government official (born 1980)

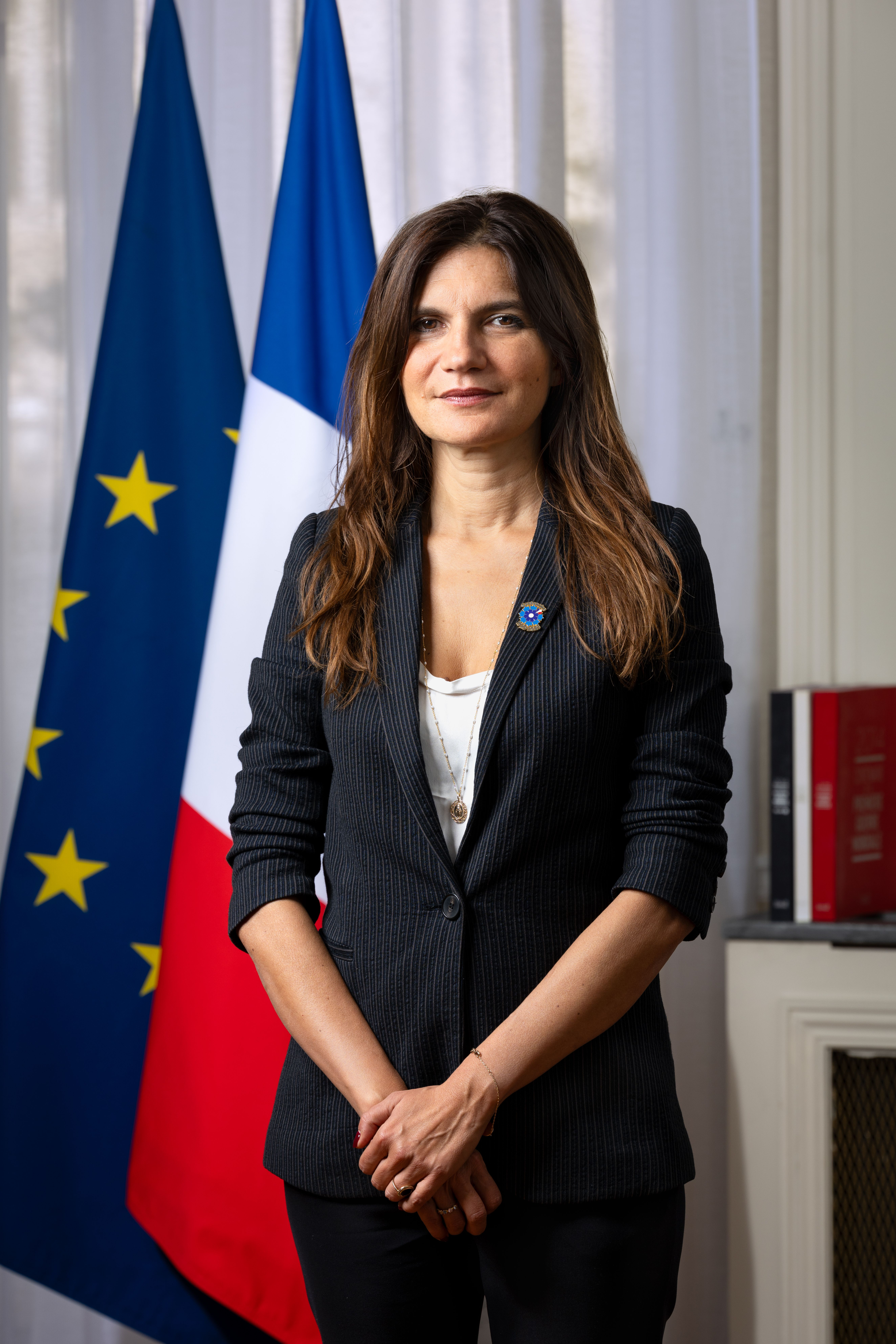

Minister Delegate to the Minister of the Armed Forces
- Incumbent
- Assumed office 12 October 2025
- Prime Minister: Sébastien Lecornu
- Minister: Catherine Vautrin

Personal details
- Born: Alice Louise Émilie Rufo; 9 April 1980 (age 46) Toulon, France
- Parent: Marcel Rufo (father)
- Education: École normale supérieure Sciences Po; Paris 1 Panthéon-Sorbonne University; École nationale d'administration
- Occupation: Civil servant

Alice Louise Émilie Rufo (French pronunciation: [alis ʁyfo]; born 9 April 1980) is a French senior civil servant and politician who has served as Minister Delegate to the Minister of the Armed Forces in the second Lecornu government since 12 October 2025.

She had previously been appointed Director General for International Relations and Strategy at the Ministry of the Armed Forces on 1 November 2022. As Minister Delegate, Rufo is tasked with European defence amid the Russian invasion of Ukraine.

== Personal life ==
Rufo is married and has one child. She is the daughter of medicine professor Marcel Rufo.

== Honours ==
- Knight of the Ordre national du Mérite (2023)
