= 17th legislature of the French Fifth Republic =

2024–present sitting of the French Parliament

17th legislature of the French Fifth Republic XVII^{e} législature de la Cinquième République française

History
- Founded: 2024
- Preceded by: 16th legislature

Leadership
- President of the National Assembly: Yaël Braun-Pivet, RE since 18 July 2024

Structure
- Political groups: Government (162): EPR (92) (Note: Renaissance (87) (Note: RE-TdP (9)); DVD (2); PRV (1); GNC (1); Tapura (1)); LD (36) (Note: MoDem (33); Renaissance (2); RSM (1)); HOR (34) (Note: Horizons (26); LR (2); Renaissance (2); LC (1); DVD (1); AC (1); CCB (1)); Supported by (49): DR (49) (Note: LR (44); DVD (5)); Opposition (366): RN (123) (Note: RN (115); LAF (5); IDL (3)); LFI (71) (Note: LFI (67); NPA (1); REV (1); RÉ 974 (1); Péyi-A (1)); SOC (69) (Note: PS (64); PP (2); PPDG (1); EH Bai (1); Ex-Renaissance (1)); E&S (38) (Note: LÉ (25); G.s (6); L'Après (4); GE (1); T44 (1); D! (1)); LIOT (22) (Note: UDI (6); R&PS (3) (Note: FeC (2); PNC (1)); LR (2); PS (2); DVD (2); DVG (2); PRV (1); LC (1); La Convention (1); AD (1); AHIP (1)); GDR (17) (Note: PCF (8); PLR (2); GRS (1); LP (1); Péyi-A (1); Tāvini (1); UC (1); MDES (1); PLD (1)); UDR (17); NI (9) (Note: LR (2); DVD (2); RN (2); Renaissance (1); AC (1); EC (1))

Elections
- Voting system: Two-round system
- Last election: 30 June and 7 July 2024
- Next election: No later than June 2029

The 17th legislature of the Fifth French Republic (French: XVII^{e} législature de la Cinquième République française) was elected in the 2024 French legislative election. On July 18, 2024, Yaël Braun-Pivet was re-elected to serve as President of the National Assembly during this legislature.
