= 16th legislature of the French Fifth Republic =

2022–2024 sitting of the French Parliament

16th legislature of the Fifth French Republic XVI^{e} législature de la Cinquième République française

History
- Founded: 28 June 2022
- Disbanded: 9 June 2024
- Preceded by: 15th legislature
- Succeeded by: 17th legislature

Leadership
- President of the National Assembly: Yaël Braun-Pivet, RE since 28 June 2022
- President of the Senate: Gérard Larcher, LR since 1 October 2014
- Government: Borne, Attal, Ensemble

Structure
- Seats: 577 deputies
- Political groups: Government (250): RE (170) (Note: Renaissance (150); PRV (4); EC (4); Horizons (2); PÉ (1); FP (1); GNC (1); CE (1); DVC (5); DVD (3)); DEM (51) (Note: MoDem (45); Renaissance (3); PRG (1)); HOR (30) (Note: Horizons (27); LFA (1); CCB (1); Renaissance (1)); Support (45): LR (42) (Note: LR (38); LR-SL (2); UDI (1); DVD (1)) (Note: LR has repeatedly voted down motions of no confidence which would have brought down the Government had they passed, including motions which would have prevented the Government's budget from being enacted, and as such can be classified as granting the incumbent executive confidence and supply); LIOT diss. (2) (Note: UDI (2)); NI (1) (Note: EXD (1)); Opposition (278): RN (88); LFI (74) (Note: LFI (69) (Note: PG (21); RÉ974 (1); PD (1); Péyi-A (1); REV (1)); Ensemble! (5); POI (1)); SOC (31) (Note: PS (27); FGPS (1); PPDG (1); PPM (1); DVG (1)); ECO (22) (Note: EELV (16); G·s (4); GE (2)) (Note: They contest latest election as Ecologist Pole); GDR (22) (Note: PCF (12); TH (3); PLR (2); DVG (2); MDES (1); Progrès (1); Péyi-A (1)); LIOT (18) (Note: PS dissents (4); UDI (3); Femu (2); DVG (2); DVD (2); PRV dissents (1); AD (1); LC (1); PNC (1); REG (1)); LR diss. (19) (Note: 19 LR deputies have voted for censure motions, making them effectively dissidents that are part of the opposition.); NI (4) (Note: DLF (1); LFI (1); DVG (1); DVD (1)); Other: Vacant (4)

Elections
- Voting system: Two-round system
- Last election: 12 and 19 June 2022

The 16th legislature of the Fifth French Republic (French: XVI^{e} législature de la Cinquième République française) was elected in the 2022 French legislative election. It was preceded by the 15th legislature. On 9 June 2024, following a defeat in the 2024 European Parliament Elections, President Emmanuel Macron dissolved the National Assembly, as per article 12 of the Constitution of the Fifth French Republic, (Note: "The President of the Republic may, after consulting the Prime Minister and the Presidents of the Houses of Parliament, declare the National Assembly dissolved. A general election shall take place no fewer than twenty days and no more than forty days after the dissolution. The National Assembly shall sit as of right on the second Thursday following its election. Should this sitting fall outside the period prescribed for the ordinary session, a session shall be convened by right for a fifteen-day period. No further dissolution shall take place within a year following said election.") and called for snap elections on 30 June (1st round) and 7 July (2nd round).

== Composition of the executive ==
- President of France: Emmanuel Macron (LREM), since 14 May 2017

== Membership ==
For the first time since the 1988 legislative election, the incumbent President of France failed to earn a parliamentary majority in the National Assembly. The 2022 legislative election was widely seen as a severe blow for Emmanuel Macron. Both the outgoing President of the National Assembly Richard Ferrand and leader of the La République En Marche! party in the National Assembly Christophe Castaner lost their seats. The position of Élisabeth Borne as Prime Minister was put into question following the election result. On 21 June 2022, she offered her resignation to President Macron, who refused to accept it.

On 28 June 2022, Yaël Braun-Pivet was elected to succeed Ferrand as President of the National Assembly.

Composition of the National Assembly following the 2022 election according to Ministry of the Interior candidate labels

Composition of the National Assembly with all parties shown separately

== See also ==
- Election results of Cabinet Ministers during the 2022 French legislative election
- List of MPs who lost their seat in the 2022 French legislative election
- Results of the 2022 French legislative election by constituency
