= UDR (parliamentary group) =

French political group

UDR UDR
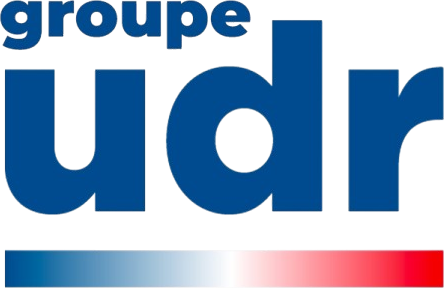
- Chamber: National Assembly
- Legislature(s): 17th (Fifth Republic)
- Foundation: 18 July 2024
- Previous name(s): On the Right (July-September 2024)
- Member parties: Union of the Right for the Republic
- President: Éric Ciotti
- Constituency: Alpes-Maritimes's 1st
- Representation: 17 / 577
- Ideology: Right-libertarianism
- Political position: Far-right
- Website: X page

UDR (French: UDR), formerly the On the Right! (French: À Droite!, AD!), is a French political group in the National Assembly created at the beginning of the 17th legislature (2024–present). It is presided by Éric Ciotti, and groups politicians of the Union of the Right for the Republic (UDR). The UDR group is allied to the National Rally group.

== Creation ==
The parliamentary group On the Right was founded by The Republicans president Éric Ciotti following the 2024 legislative election before which a serious crisis broke out within his own The Republicans party. The new group with 16 deputies split from The Republicans group, renamed the Republican Right group in 2024.

The group was renamed to the UDR group on 11 September 2024, taking the name of Ciotti's Union of the Right for the Republic (UDR) party.

The UDR group was the only one in the Assemblée Nationale to have completely voted against the euthanasia legalization law (loi Falorni) of 2026.

== Composition ==
- Alexandre Allegret-Pilot, Gard's 5th constituency
- Charles Alloncle, Hérault's 9th constituency
- Pierre-Henri Carbonnel, Tarn-et-Garonne's 1st constituency
- Matthieu Bloch, Doubs's 3rd constituency
- Bernard Chaix, Alpes-Maritimes's 3rd constituency
- Marc Chavent, Ain's 5th constituency
- Éric Ciotti, Alpes-Maritimes's 1st constituency
- Christelle d'Intorni, Alpes-Maritimes's 5th constituency
- Olivier Fayssat, Bouches-du-Rhône's 6th constituency
- Bartolomé Lenoir, Creuse's constituency
- Hanane Mansouri, Isère's 8th constituency
- Maxime Michelet, Marne's 3rd constituency
- Éric Michoux, Saône-et-Loire's 4th constituency
- Vincent Trébuchet, Ardèche's 2nd constituency
- Sophie Vaginay-Ricourt, Alpes-de-Haute-Provence's 2nd constituency
- Antoine Valentin, Haute-Savoie's 3rd constituency
- Gérault Verny, Bouches-du-Rhône's 14th constituency

== See also ==
- Union of the Right for the Republic
- Union of the Far-Right
