= Horizons and Independents =

Parliamentary group in France

Horizons and Independents Horizons & Indépendants
- Chamber: National Assembly
- Legislature(s): 16th and 17th (Fifth Republic)
- Foundation: 28 June 2022
- Member parties: Horizons; The Centrists; Bonapartist Central Committee
- Constituency: Seine-et-Marne's 2nd
- Representation: 31 / 577

Horizons & Indépendants is a parliamentary group of the French National Assembly formed on June 22, 2022, following the 2022 French legislative election. The group is chaired by Laurent Marcangeli, Naïma Moutchou functions as the group's vice president, and Frédéric Valletoux functions as its spokesperson.

== Historical membership ==
Year	Seats	Change	Notes
2022	30 / 577	▲30	
2024	31 / 577	▲1	
