= Republican Right =

National Assembly parliamentary group in France

Republican Right Droite Républicaine
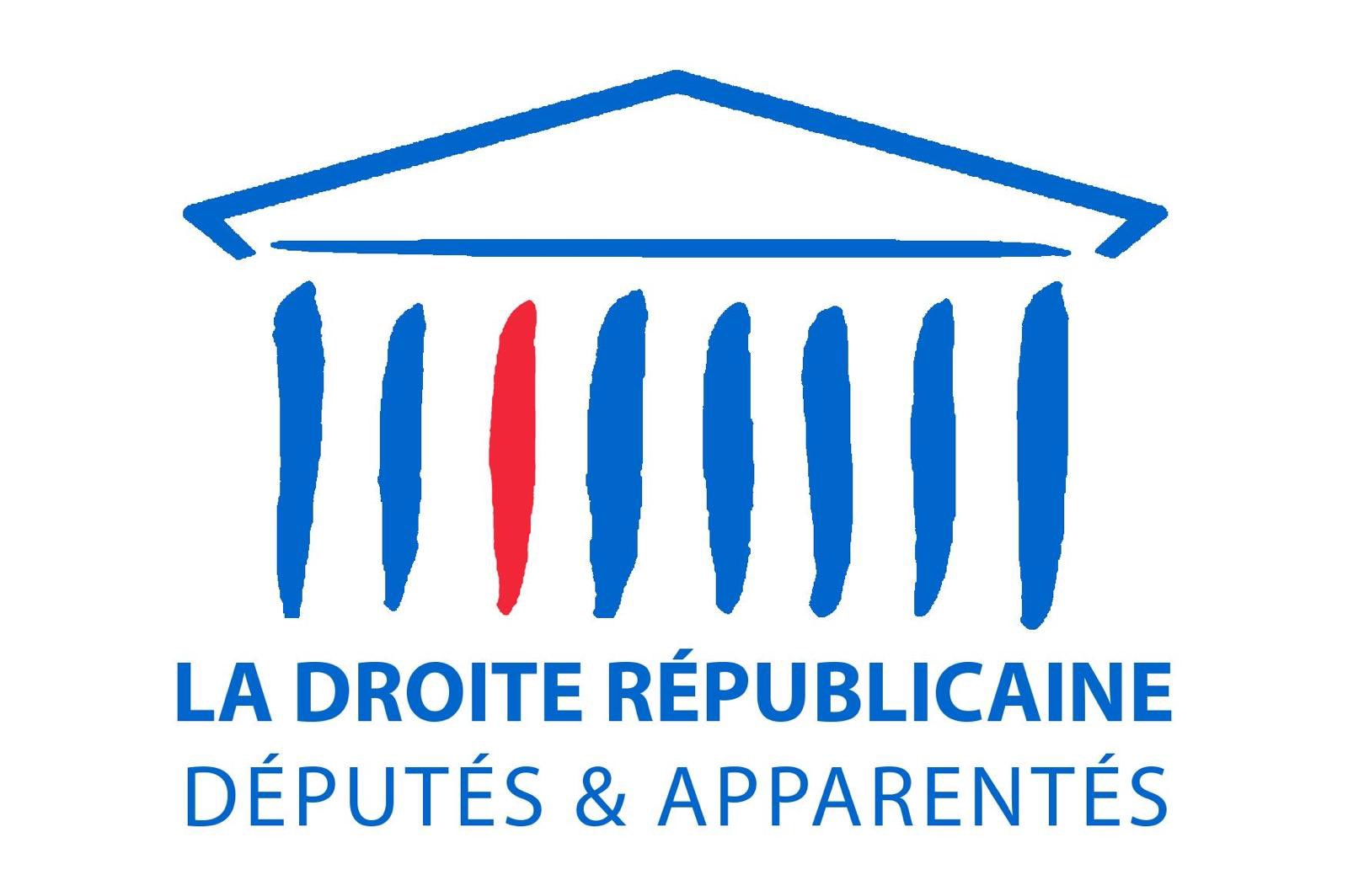
- Chamber: National Assembly
- Legislature(s): 12th, 13th, 14th, 15th, 16th and 17th (Fifth Republic)
- Foundation: 25 June 2002
- Previous name(s): Union for the Presidential Majority group (2002–2003) Groupe de l'Union pour la majorité présidentielle; Union for a Popular Movement group (2003–2015) Groupe de l'Union pour un mouvement populaire; The Republicans group (2015–2024) Groupe Les Républicains
- Member parties: The Republicans
- President: Laurent Wauquiez
- Constituency: Haute-Loire's 1st
- Spokesperson: Émilie Bonnivard; Anne-Laure Blin; Philippe Gosselin
- Representation: 50 / 577
- Ideology: Neo-Gaullism; Liberal conservatism Pro-Europeanism
- Political position: Centre-right to right-wing
- Website: deputes-les-republicains.fr

The Republican Right (French: Groupe Droite républicaine, DR), formerly the Union for a Popular Movement group (French: Groupe de l'Union pour un mouvement populaire, UMP) from 2003 and 2015 and The Republicans group (French: Groupe Les Républicains, LR) from 2015 to 2024, is a parliamentary group in the National Assembly including representatives of The Republicans (LR), formerly the Union for a Popular Movement.

== History ==
The group was formed in the National Assembly of the 12th legislature of the French Fifth Republic on 25 June 2002 with 356 deputies following the legislative elections under the name of the Union for the Presidential Majority group (groupe de l'Union pour la majorité présidentielle), and was renamed to the Union for a Popular Movement group (groupe de l'Union pour un mouvement populaire) in line with that of its associated party on 5 March 2003. The group was subsequently reformed on 26 June 2007 with 314 members and 6 related following the legislative elections, and again on 26 June 2012 with 185 members and 11 related after legislative elections. On 2 June 2015, the name of the group was changed to The Republicans group (groupe Les Républicains) following the renaming of the party to The Republicans.

The UMP group in the National Assembly was initially presided over by Jacques Barrot after his election unopposed on 19 June 2002, who later resigned to serve on the European Commission following Michel Barnier. Bernard Accoyer was elected unopposed on 4 May 2004 to replace him, serving until June 2007, after which successfully sought to become president of the National Assembly and replaced by Jean-François Copé. After Copé became General Secretary of the UMP, Christian Jacob was elected to succeed him on 23 November 2010. Jacob was re-elected most recently on 21 June 2017, collecting 62 votes against Damien Abad, who received 32 votes.

In the 2017 legislative elections, only 112 deputies under the label of the Republicans were elected, a "historic reversal" for the party, with the right and centre registering its worst score in the history of the Fifth Republic, the previous record being 158 deputies in the 1981 legislative elections. With the election of Emmanuel Macron and appointment of three right-wing ministers to his government, divisions in the right re-emerged, with a number of "constructives" interested in supporting his project. On 21 June, Thierry Solère announced the creation of a common group with the Union of Democrats and Independents (UDI) likely to contain 18 UDI and about 15 LR deputies. The formation of two parliamentary groups on the right represented a symbolic divorce to the two threads on the right (moderates and hardliners) and the end of the old UMP, created in 2002 to unite the right and centre.

On 27 June, Virginie Duby-Muller, Damien Abad, Valérie Lacroute, Véronique Louwagie, Frédérique Meunier, François Cornut-Gentille, Julien Aubert, Gérard Cherpion, Arnaud Viala, Guillaume Peltier, and Gilles Lurton were designated as the group's vice presidents. At the time of its formation on 27 June, the parliamentary group included 100 deputies, including 5 associated members.

On 8 December, the constitutional council annulled the election of Ian Boucard in Territoire de Belfort's 1st constituency due to the distribution of misleading electoral leaflets by the candidate; as a result, a by-election was held to fill the vacant seat in 2018, and Boucard was re-elected. The constitutional council subsequently annulled the election of Jean-Pierre Door, who won by 8 votes in Loiret's 4th constituency, on 18 December, triggering a by-election. Marine Brenier left the UDI, Agir and Independents group to rejoin the LR group on 23 January 2018, and Boucard won the by-election in Territoire de Belfort, and joined the group together with Antoine Savignat after he won the by-election in Val-d'Oise.

== Splinter factions ==
- Rassemblement-UMP group (2012 to 2013)
- UDR group (from 2024)

== List of presidents ==
Portrait	Name	Term start	Term end	Notes
	Jacques Barrot	19 June 2002	4 May 2004	
	Bernard Accoyer	4 May 2004	19 June 2007	
	Jean-François Copé	20 June 2007	23 November 2010	
	Christian Jacob	23 November 2010	6 November 2019	
	Damien Abad	6 November 2019	19 May 2022	
	Virginie Duby-Muller (ad interim)	19 May 2022	22 June 2022	
	Olivier Marleix	22 June 2022	9 June 2024	
Vacant		9 June 2024	10 July 2024	
	Laurent Wauquiez	10 July 2024	Present	

== Historical membership ==
Year	Seats	Change	Notes
2002	365 / 577	Steady	
2007	320 / 577	▼45	
2012	196 / 577	▼124	
2017	100 / 577	▼96	
2022	62 / 577	▼38	
2024	47 / 577	▼15	

== See also ==
- The Republicans group (Senate)
