= National Rally group =

Parliamentary group in France

National Rally group Groupe Rassemblement national
- Chamber: National Assembly
- Legislature(s): 16th (Fifth Republic)
- Foundation: 28 June 2022
- Member parties: National Rally; French Future; Identity–Liberties
- President: Marine Le Pen; Jean-Philippe Tanguy (delegate)
- Constituency: Pas-de-Calais's 11th
- Vice presidents: Bruno Bilde; Alexandre Loubet; Caroline Colombier; Caroline Parmentier; Yoann Gillet; Laurent Jacobelli
- General secretary: Renaud Labaye
- Representation: 126 / 577
- Ideology: French nationalism Right-wing populism Euroscepticism
- Website: https://deputes-rn.fr/

The National Rally group (French: Groupe Rassemblement National) is a parliamentary group in the National Assembly of France including representatives of the National Rally formed after the 2022 legislative election. The group has been chaired by Marine Le Pen since its creation on June 28, 2022. It also included members of the smaller French Future party and, briefly, a member of the League of the South who later joined the National Rally.

The RN parliamentary party was the largest single opposition party in the lower house from 2022 to 2024, but was much smaller than the NUPES alliance. Following the 2024 snap election, it became the largest opposition group and also included members of Identity–Liberties. It is also backed in parliament by the UDR group, formed by the Union of the Right for the Republic.

== List of presidents ==
Name	Term start	Term end	Constituency
Marine Le Pen	28 June 2022	present	Pas-de-Calais's 11th

== Historical membership ==
Year	Seats	Change	Notes
2022	89 / 577	▲81	Anne-Sophie Frigout, RN deputy for the 2nd constituency of the Marne, lost her seat in a January 2023 by-election, reducing the total number of RN members to 88.
2024	126 / 577	▲37	
