= Together for the Republic (parliamentary group) =

Parliamentary group in France

Together for the Republic Ensemble pour la République
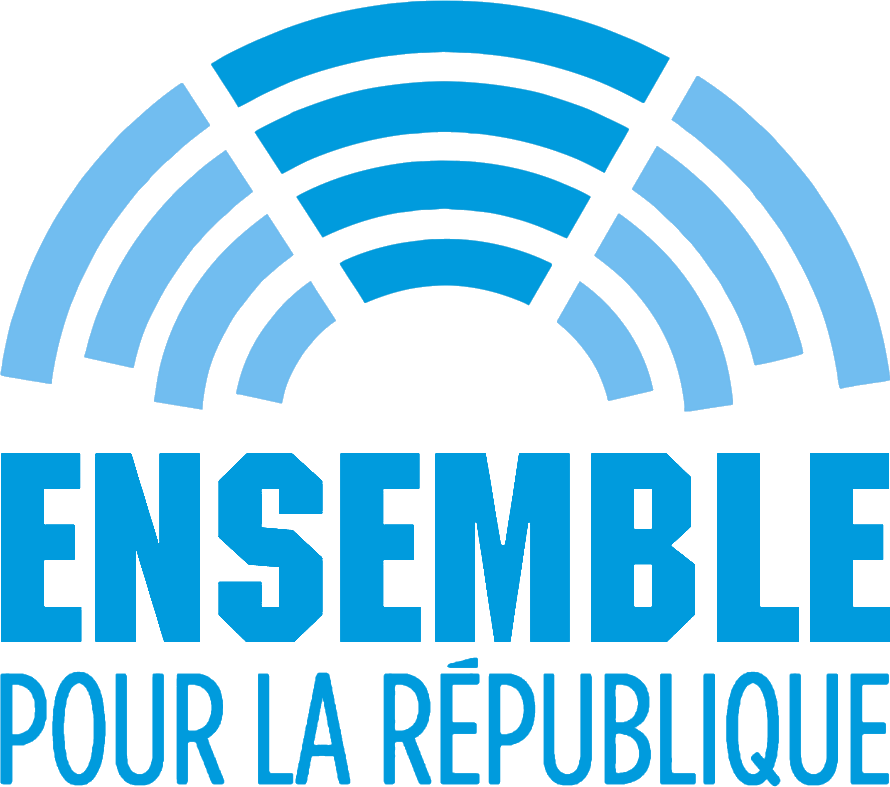
- Chamber: National Assembly
- Legislature(s): 15th (Fifth Republic); 16th (Fifth Republic); 17th (Fifth Republic)
- Foundation: 27 June 2017
- Member parties: Renaissance; Radical Party; En Commun; Générations NC; Centrist Alliance; Tapura Huiraatira
- President: Gabriel Attal
- Constituency: Hauts-de-Seine's 10th
- Vice presidents: Pacôme Rupin; Coralie Dubost; Danièle Hérin; Gilles Le Gendre (all formerly)
- Spokesperson: Stanislas Guerini; Olivia Grégoire; Hervé Berville; Aurore Bergé (all formerly)
- Treasurer: Guillaume Gouffier-Cha; Stéphanie Do (all formerly)
- Representation: 99 / 577
- Ideology: Liberalism (French)

Together for the Republic (French: Ensemble pour la République), previously La République En Marche group (French: La République en Marche) until 2022 and as Renaissance Deputies until 2024, is a parliamentary group in the National Assembly of France including representatives of Renaissance (formerly La République En Marche!). It was formed following the 2017 legislative election.

In the 2022 legislative election, which resulted in a hung parliament, the group lost 141 seats from its original 313 seats. It remains the largest group in the National Assembly under the 16th legislature of the Fifth Republic.

== History ==
On 24 June 2017, Richard Ferrand was elected La République En Marche group president with 306 votes and two abstentions. On 27 June, the group voted to designate François de Rugy its candidate for the office of President of the National Assembly, to be elected later that day; with a total of 301 votes cast, he collected 153 against 59 for Sophie Errante, 54 for Brigitte Bourguignon, 32 for Philippe Folliot, 2 blank votes and 1 null vote. Pacôme Rupin, Coralie Dubost, Danièle Hérin and Gilles Le Gendre were selected as the group's initial vice presidents; Aurore Bergé, Stanislas Guerini, Olivia Grégoire and Hervé Berville as spokespersons; and Guillaume Gouffier-Cha and Stéphanie Do as treasurers. De Rugy was elected President of the National Assembly the same day; former Prime Minister Manuel Valls announced his intention to leave the Socialist Party and seek to affiliate with the LREM parliamentary group.

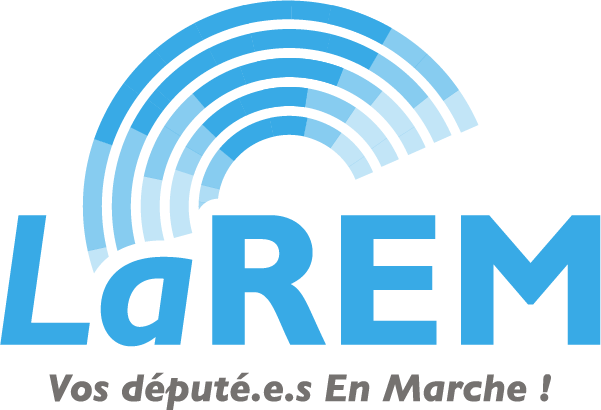
Previous logo of the group from 2017 to 2022, when it was named Groupe La République En Marche

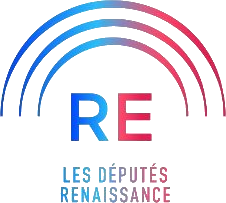
Alternate logo of the group since 2022

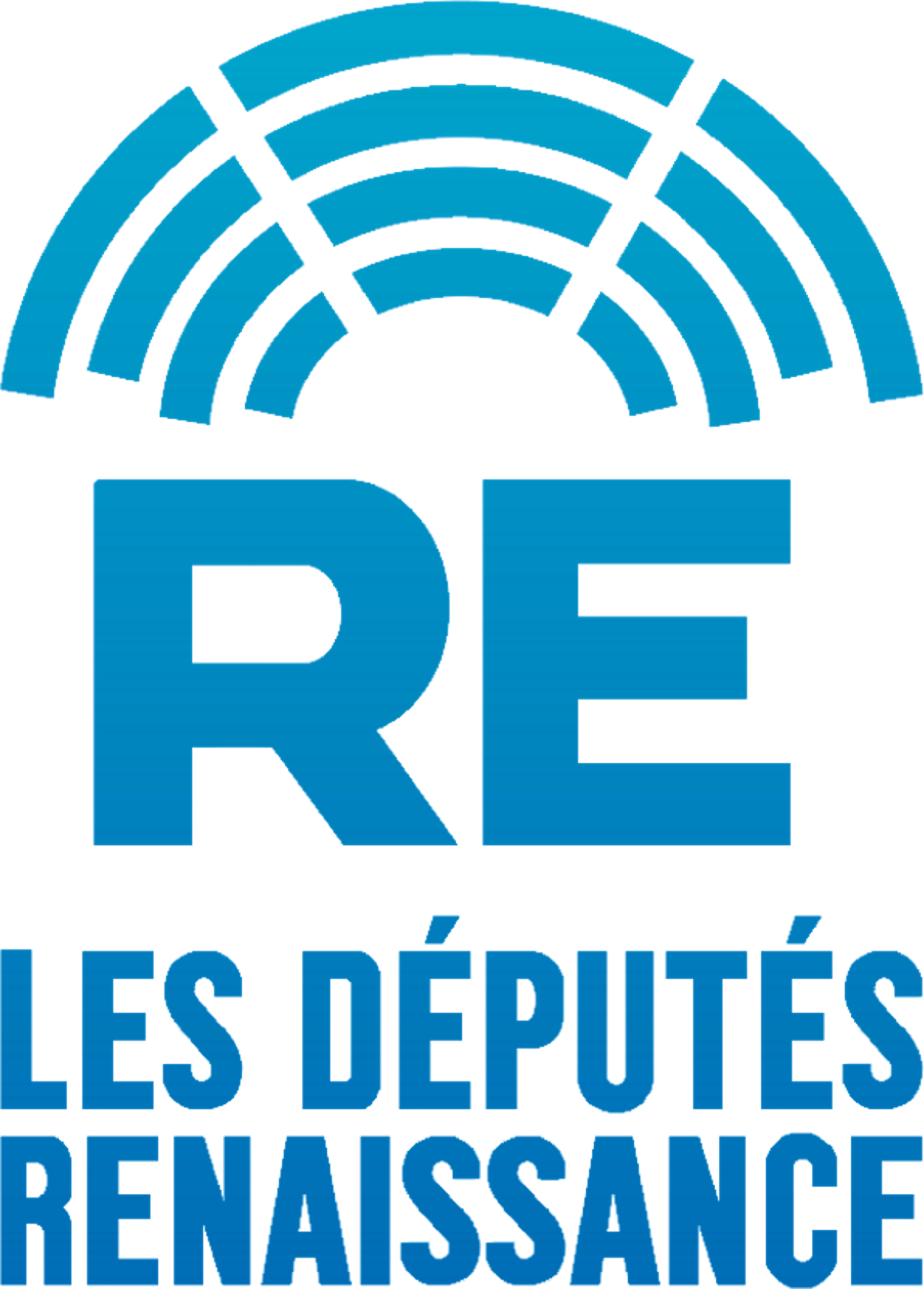
Logo of the group from 2022 to 2024

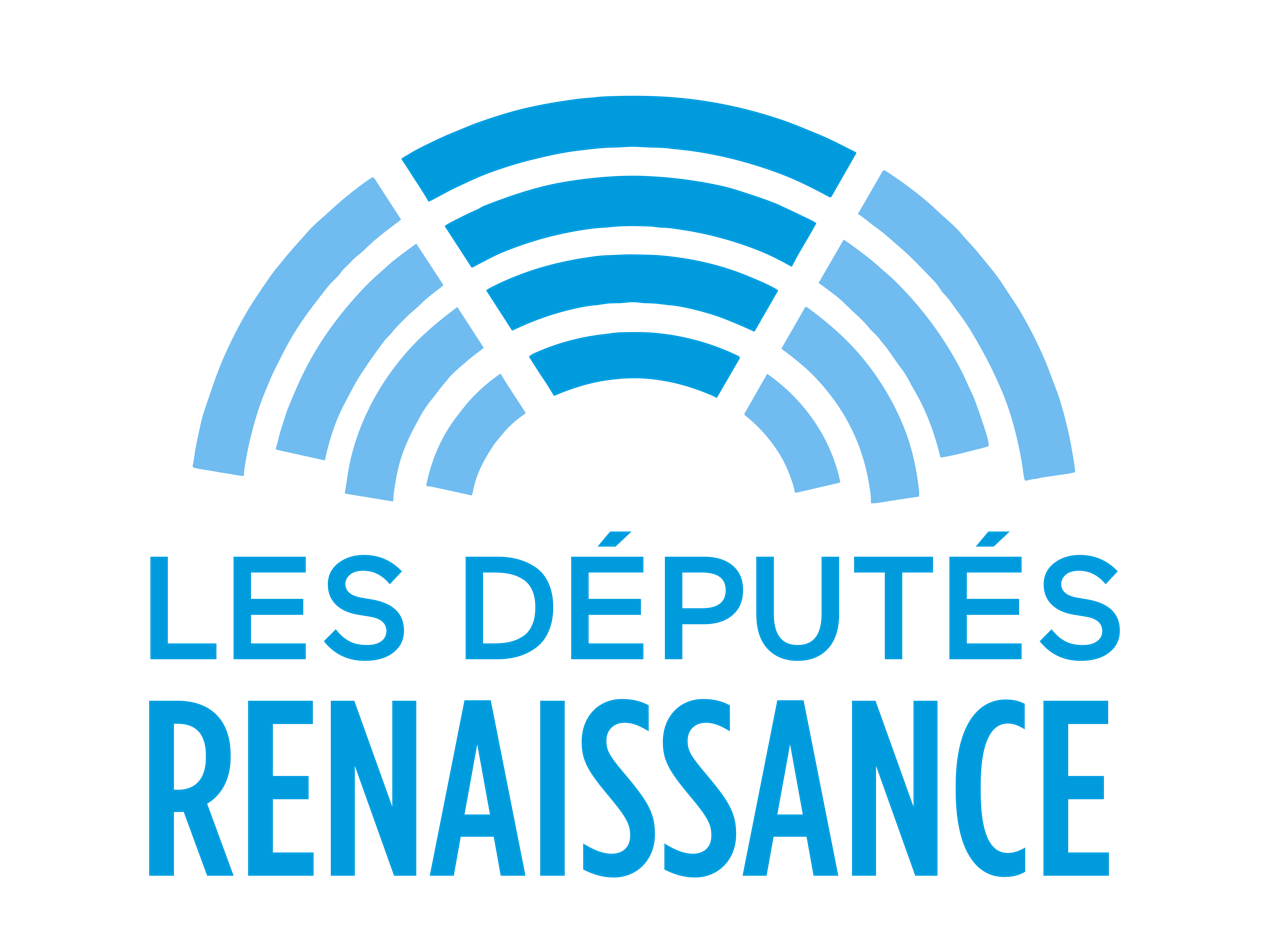
Logo of the group in 2024, prior to its renaming

At the time of its formation on 27 June, the LREM parliamentary group included 313 deputies, including 4 associated members. Manuel Valls later joined the group as an associated member. On 5 September, M'jid El Guerrab left the group and party after his physical assault of Socialist Boris Faure.

On 16 November, the Constitutional Council nullified the election of deputy Isabelle Muller-Quoy on 16 November 2017 under article L.O. 132 of the electoral code; a by-election was subsequently held in her constituency in 2018 to fill the vacant seat. After his exclusion from The Republicans and subsequent adhesion to La République En Marche!, Thierry Solère left the Constructives group for the La République En Marche group. On 8 December, the Constitutional Council nullified the election of Lénaïck Adam in French Guiana's 2nd constituency under article R42 of the electoral code; a by-election was held in his constituency as a result. The nullification of the election of Ramlati Ali in Mayotte's 1st constituency on 19 January 2018 triggered another by-election, as was the case in the 5th constituency for French residents overseas, where the nullification of the election of Samantha Cazebonne triggered another by-election.

== List of presidents ==
Name	Term start	Term end	Constituency	Notes
Richard Ferrand	24 June 2017	12 September 2018	Finistère's 6th	Left the group presidency upon his election as President of the National Assembly
Gilles Le Gendre	12 September 2018	10 September 2020	Paris's 2nd	
Christophe Castaner	10 September 2020	21 June 2022	Alpes de Haute-Provence's 2nd	Lost his seat in the 2022 legislative election
Aurore Bergé	21 June 2022	20 July 2023	Yvelines's 10th	Replaced ad interim by group vice president Sylvain Maillard during her maternity leave in November 2022, relinquished the group presidency upon her appointment as Minister in the 2023 French government reshuffle
Sylvain Maillard	24 July 2023	9 June 2024	Paris's 1st	
Gabriel Attal	5 September 2024	present	Hauts-de-Seine's 10th	

== Historical membership ==
Year	Seats	Change	Notes
2017	313 / 577	▲313	
2022	172 / 577	▼141	
2024	99 / 577	▼73	

== See also ==
- Rally of Democrats, Progressive and Independent group (Senate)
