= Union of the Right for the Republic =

French political party

Union of the Right for the Republic Union des droites pour la République
- Abbreviation: UDR
- President: Éric Ciotti
- Secretary-General: Hanane Mansouri
- Vice Presidents: François Falletti; Alexandre Avril; Christelle d'Intorni; Brigitte Barèges; Sophie Vaginay-Ricourt
- Founder: Éric Ciotti
- Founded: 3 September 2012 (as the Friends of Éric Ciotti); 31 August 2024 (as the UDR)
- Split from: The Republicans (2024)
- Headquarters: 15 Quai des Deux-Emmanuel, Nice, France
- Ideology: Right-libertarianism; Right-wing populism
- Political position: Far-right
- National affiliation: UMP/LR (2012–2024); National Rally (since 2024)
- European affiliation: None
- European Parliament group: EPP Group (2024–2026); Patriots for Europe (since 2026)
- Colors: Blue
- Slogan: Pour que la France reste la France ('So that France remains France')
- National Assembly: 17 / 577
- Senate: 1 / 348
- European Parliament: 1 / 81

Website
- udr.fr

The Union of the Right for the Republic (French: Union des droites pour la République, UDR) (Note: Occasionally referred to as the Union of the Rights for the Republic and formerly known as the Association of Friends of Éric Ciotti (French: Association des Amis d'Éric Ciotti) and On the Right! Friends of Éric Ciotti (French: À droite ! Les Amis d'Éric Ciotti, ADAEC).) is a far-right (Note: Attributed to multiple sources:) political party in France. Founded in 2012 by Éric Ciotti as a group within The Republicans (LR), the party took its current name and became a separate entity following the crisis within The Republicans ahead of the 2024 legislative election which saw Ciotti resign his position as LR leader. The UDR allied itself with the National Rally (RN) in the election and performed well, forming the UDR group in the National Assembly.

The party draws inspiration from right-libertarianism. In the European Parliament, it sits with the Patriots for Europe.

== History ==
=== Beginnings ===
The Association of Friends of Éric Ciotti was founded on 3 September 2012 by Éric Ciotti. Its headquarters were established at 15 Quai des Deux-Emmanuel in Nice, France. The political party was also named "On the Right! Friends of Éric Ciotti".

In 2021, Ciotti, who was representing the 1st constituency of Alpes-Maritimes in the National Assembly, aimed to structure the right wing of The Republicans (LR) party, and set his conditions for candidates during his traditional reunion with the "Friends of Éric Ciotti". Seeking those nostalgic of François Fillon's leadership, he used the database of supporters of the Republican Force, and obtained between three and four hundred requests for membership in the Association of Friends of Éric Ciotti. While candidate for the presidency of The Republicans, Ciotti unveiled his campaign slogan, "la droite au cœur" (transl. The Right at the Heart), during a reunion of the "Friends of Éric Ciotti" in September 2022. In 2023, Nice municipal councillor Bernard Chaix became the vice president of the party.

=== 2024 legislative election ===
During the 2024 legislative election, Ciotti made an agreement with the leadership of the National Rally (RN) without consulting his party. This deal aimed to run his candidates under the joint LR–RN label, registered with the prefecture under the name of his minor party "On the Right! Friends of Éric Ciotti". Campaign posters and candidate declarations bore the labels "Candidat républicain" (transl. Republican candidate) or "Républicains à droite" (transl. Republicans on the right), the later of which appeared on his office façade starting on 27 June. The Ministry of the Interior classified these candidates under the political designation "Union of the Far-Right" (UXD), a classification disputed by Ciotti, who demanded they be categorized under "Union of the Right", denouncing the ministry's decision as a "scandalous maneuver". A total of 64 candidates were registered under this label, with less than half coming from the LR party. The list also included former supporters of Éric Zemmour, close associates of CNews commentators Marion Maréchal and Pierre-Édouard Stérin, former Socialist Party politician Thierry Coudert, and former La République en Marche!-supporting lawyer Alexandre Dupalais.

In the first round of the election, Christelle d'Intorni was reelected to her seat, and 60 candidates of the LR–RN alliance advanced to the second round, with 38 of them leading in their constituencies. In the second round, seventeen candidates supported by Éric Ciotti and the National Rally were elected, surpassing the mininmum threshold of fifteen deputies required to form a parliamentary group at the National Assembly. These newly-elected deputies established their own group in the 17th legislature of the French Fifth Republic, initially called the On the Right group.

=== Creation of the Union of the Right for the Republic ===
On 31 August 2024, amid the ongoing unresolved crisis within The Republicans, Ciotti announced his intention to form a new party called the Union of the Right for the Republic (UDR). This name evoked a former Gaullist party, the Union of Democrats for the Republic, also abbreviated as UDR.

Following the 2026 municipal elections, senator Henri Leroy from Alpes-Maritimes defected from The Republicans to the UDR, becoming its first member in the Senate.

== Leadership ==
As of 3 October 2024

Role	Name
President	Éric Ciotti
Deputy Vice President	Guilhem Carayon
Vice Presidents	François Falletti, Alexandre Avril, Christelle d'Intorni, Brigitte Barèges, Sophie Vaginay-Ricourt
General Secretary	Hanane Mansouri
Deputy General Secretaries	Charles Alloncle, Gérault Verny, Vincent Trébuchet, Théo Michel
Treasurer	Bernard Chaix
General Delegates	Arnaud Dassier, Antoine Valentin
National Delegates	Laurent Castillo, Charles Prats, Sébastien Laye, Philippe Fontana

== See also ==
- UDR group
- Union of the Far-Right
- National Union for Territories Group
