= La France Insoumise – New Popular Front =

Democratic socialist parliamentary group in France

La France Insoumise – New Popular Front La France Insoumise – Nouveau Front Populaire
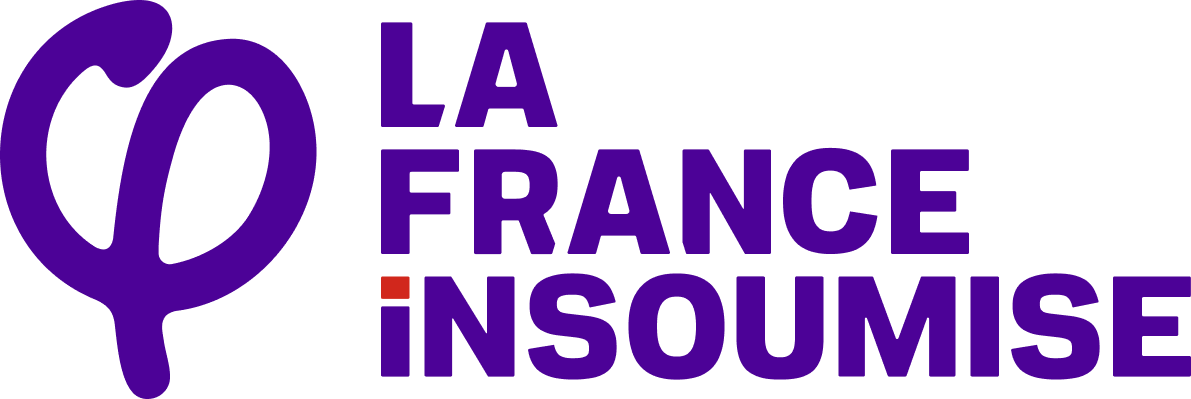
- Chamber: National Assembly
- Legislature(s): 15th (Fifth Republic); 16th (Fifth Republic); 17th (Fifth Republic)
- Foundation: 27 June 2017
- Member parties: LFI; LP; Gauche écosocialiste; RE974; REV; POI; Péyi-A
- President: Mathilde Panot
- Representation: 72 / 577
- Ideology: Democratic socialism Anti-neoliberalism; Eco-socialism; Left-wing populism

La France Insoumise – New Popular Front (French: La France Insoumise – Nouveau Front Populaire) is a parliamentary group in the National Assembly founded following the 2017 legislative election.

It is chaired by Mathilde Panot since 2021, having previously been led by Jean-Luc Mélenchon between 2017 and 2021. As of 2023, the group, which includes representatives of La France Insoumise (FI) and other left-wing parties, has seventy five members.

== History ==
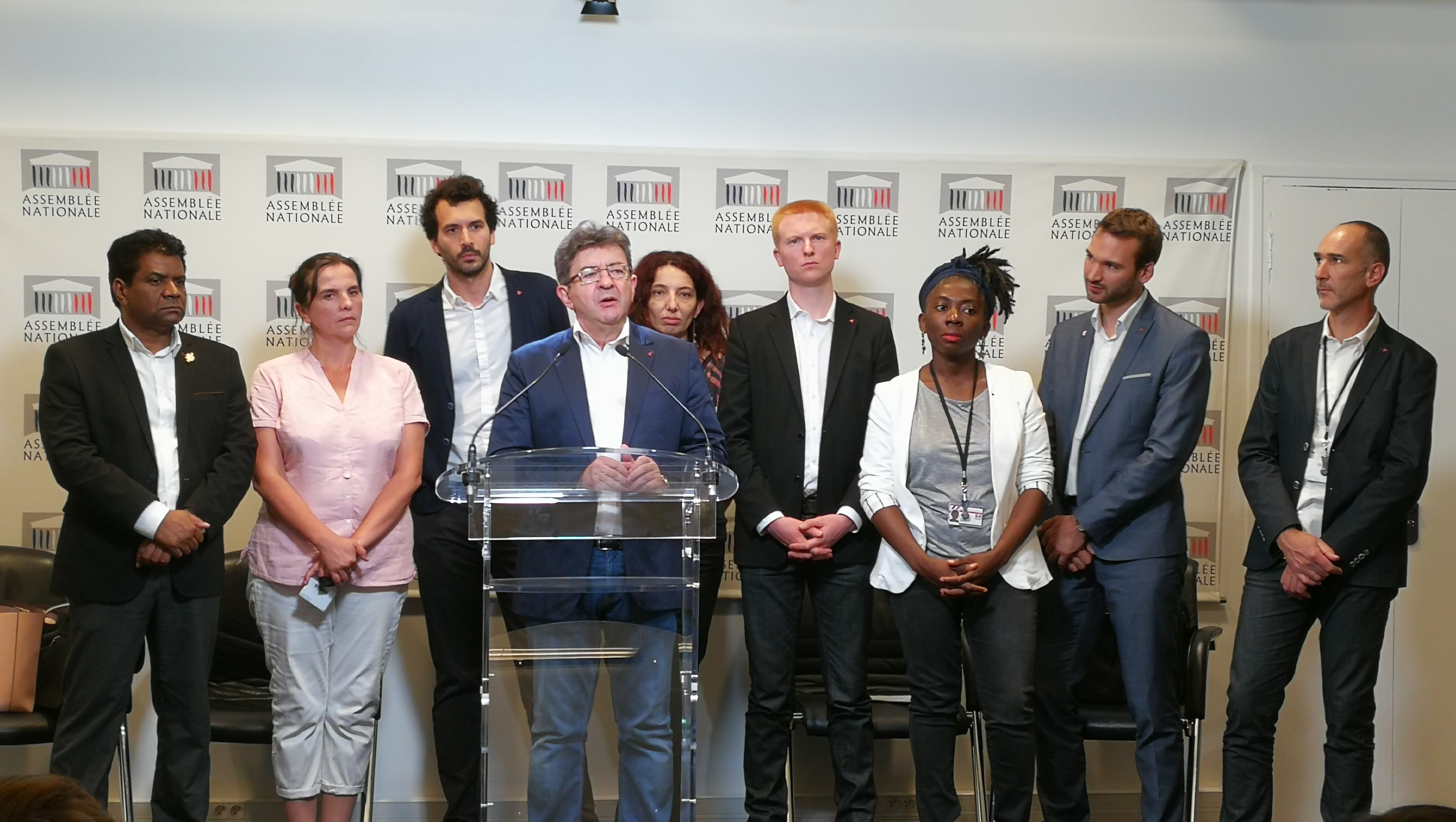
Eight of the members of the La France Insoumise group behind Mélenchon, 2017

In the 2017 legislative election, La France Insoumise (FI), the movement founded by Jean-Luc Mélenchon prior to the presidential election, failed to secure an alliance with the French Communist Party (PCF) permitting common investitures between the two movements. Both subsequently decided to form separate parliamentary groups; Chassaigne, president of the Democratic and Republican Left group (GDR), declared that his deputies would not actively oppose the FI deputies in the National Assembly. Mélenchon's wish to impose voting discipline upon his group and demand that members respect the movement's program L'Avenir en commun ("The common future") proved a barrier to an alliance between the two groups.

A total of 17 candidates running under the FI label were elected in the second round of the legislative elections, enough for the formation of a parliamentary group. Stéphane Peu, elected under the FI label but a member of the PCF, ultimately chose to remain within the GDR group, while Jean-Hugues Ratenon, who ran under the miscellaneous left label, stated that he intended to sit with the FI group if elected.

On 27 June, Mélenchon was unanimously voted as the president of the group. At the time of its formation on 27 June, the parliamentary group included 17 deputies.

Aymeric Caron from the Ecological Revolution for the Living sits in the group.

== Organisation ==
Executives of the movement include: Jean-Luc Mélenchon, Danièle Obono, Mathilde Panot, Bastien Lachaud, Alexis Corbière and Éric Coquerel.

=== Members ===
- Ugo Bernalicis
- Michel Larive
- Adrien Quatennens
- Sabine Rubin
- Muriel Ressiguier
- Loïc Prud'homme
- Clémentine Autain
- Caroline Fiat

== List of presidents ==
Name	Term start	Term end	Notes
Jean-Luc Mélenchon	27 June 2017	12 October 2021	
Mathilde Panot	12 October 2021	present	

== Historical membership ==
Year	Seats	Change	Notes
2017	17 / 577	Steady	
2022	75 / 577	▲58	
2024	72 / 577	▼3	
