= En Commun =

French environmentalist political party

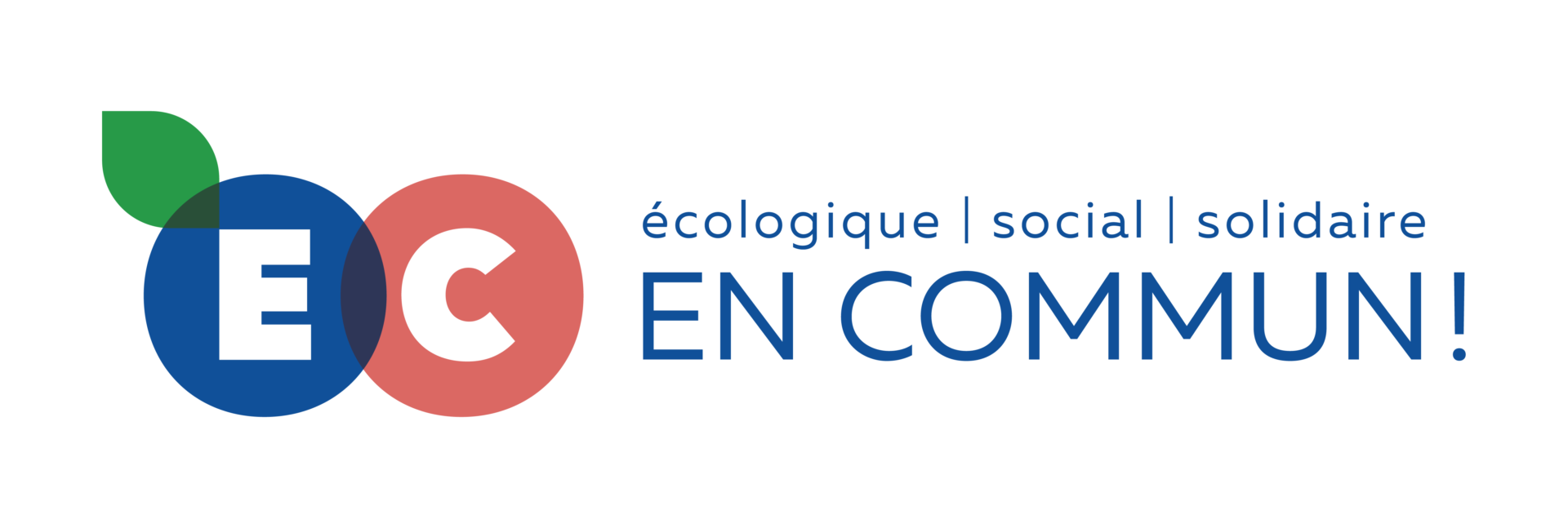
- President: Cécile Rilhac
- Founders: Barbara Pompili; Hugues Renson; Jacques Maire
- Founded: 22 May 2020; 5 years ago (as association); 14 October 2020; 5 years ago (as party)
- Split from: La République En Marche!
- Headquarters: 100, rue Molière 94200 Ivry-sur-Seine
- Membership (2020): 500 claimed
- Ideology: Green politics; Green liberalism; Social liberalism; Social democracy; Solidarism; Pro-Europeanism
- Political position: Centre-left
- National affiliation: Ensemble (2021–2025)
- Colours: Blue, red and green
- National Assembly: 1 / 577
- Senate: 0 / 348
- European Parliament: 0 / 79
- Presidency of departmental councils: 0 / 95
- Presidency of regional councils: 0 / 17

Website
- encommun-parti.com

En Commun (also En Commun!, [ɑ̃ kɔmœ̃]; English: In Common) is a French minor environmentalist centre-left political party created in 2020 by La République En Marche deputies Barbara Pompili, Hugues Renson and Jacques Maire.

The party was a member of the Ensemble coalition, which supported Emmanuel Macron in the 2022 French presidential election. After Cécile Rilhac became leader in 2024, the party left the coalition and joined Bernard Cazeneuve's La Convention movement. The party's sole remaining deputy, Stella Dupont, had left the Together for the Republic group in the National Assembly two months prior.

== Election results ==
=== European Parliament ===
Election	Leader	Votes	%	Seats	+/−	EP Group
2024 (Note: Ran as part of the Ensemble coalition.)	Valérie Hayer	3,614,646	14.6 (#2)	0 / 81	New	−

== Representatives ==
Deputies in the 15th legislature of the French Fifth Republic.

Name	Constituency	Group
Mireille Clapot	Drôme's 1st constituency	LREM
Liliana Tanguy	Finistère's 7th constituency	LREM
Pierre Cabaré	Haute-Garonne's 1st constituency	LREM
Élisabeth Toutut-Picard	Haute-Garonne's 7th constituency	LREM
Sandrine Mörch	Haute-Garonne's 9th constituency	LREM
Marion Lenne	Haute-Savoie's 5th constituency	LREM
Coralie Dubost	Hérault's 3rd constituency	LREM
Philippe Chalumeau	Indre-et-Loire's 1st constituency	LREM
Nathalie Sarles	Loire's 5th constituency	LREM
Stella Dupont	Maine-et-Loire's 2nd constituency	LREM
Nicole Gries-Trisse	Moselle's 5th constituency	LREM
Anissa Khedher	Rhône's 7th constituency	LREM
Yves Blein	Rhône's 14th constituency	LREM
Damien Pichereau	Sarthe's 1st constituency	LREM
Hugues Renson	Paris's 13th constituency	LREM
Michèle Peyron	Seine-et-Marne's 9th constituency	LREM
Didier Baichère	Yvelines's 1st constituency	LREM
Cécile Delpirou	Somme's 2nd constituency	LREM
Cécile Muschotti	Var's 2nd constituency	LREM
Catherine Osson	Nord's 8th constituency	LREM
Bénédicte Pételle	Hauts-de-Seine's 2nd constituency	LREM
Jacques Maire	Hauts-de-Seine's 8th constituency	LREM
Jean François Mbaye	Val-de-Marne's 2nd constituency	LREM
Marie Tamarelle-Verhaeghe	Eure's 3rd constituency	LREM
Cécile Rilhac	Val-d'Oise's 3rd constituency	LREM
Zivka Park	Val-d'Oise's 9th constituency	LREM
Souad Zitouni	Vaucluse's 1st constituency	LREM
