= Results of the 2024 French legislative election in Meurthe-et-Moselle =

Following the first round of the 2024 French legislative election on 30 June 2024, runoff elections in each constituency where no candidate received a vote share greater than 50 percent were scheduled for 7 July. Candidates permitted to stand in the runoff elections needed to either come in first or second place in the first round or achieve more than 12.5 percent of the votes of the entire electorate (as opposed to 12.5 percent of the vote share due to low turnout).

== Meurthe-et-Moselle ==
=== 1st constituency ===
Candidate	Party or alliance		First round		Second round	
Candidate	Party or alliance		Votes	%	Votes	%
Estelle Mercier	New Popular Front	Socialist Party	20,645	37.73	32,531	63.96
Patricia Melet	National Rally		14,719	26.90	18,334	36.04
Philippe Guillemard	Ensemble	Renaissance	14,435	26.38		
Aurélien Arnould	The Republicans		3,518	6.43		
Christiane Nimsgern	Far-left	Lutte Ouvrière	741	1.35		
Massimo Nespolo	Sovereigntist right	Debout la France	664	1.21		
Total			54,722	100.00	50,865	100.00
Valid votes			54,722	97.93	50,865	91.43
Invalid votes			357	0.64	893	1.61
Blank votes			798	1.43	3,877	6.97
Total votes			55,877	100.00	55,635	100.00
Registered voters/turnout			83,269	67.10	83,273	66.81

=== 2nd constituency ===
Candidate	Party or alliance		First round		Second round	
Candidate	Party or alliance		Votes	%	Votes	%
Stéphane Hablot	New Popular Front	Socialist Party	18,008	39.91	20,588	45.17
Emmanuel Lacresse	Ensemble	Renaissance	13,869	30.74	14,284	31.34
Geneviève Maillot	National Rally		10,131	22.45	10,709	23.49
Sloane Fromont	The Republicans		2,325	5.15		
Lucy Georges	Reconquête		422	0.94		
Odile Destombes	Far-left	Lutte Ouvrière	365	0.81		
Total			45,120	100.00	45,581	100.00
Valid votes			45,120	98.33	45,581	97.92
Invalid votes			217	0.47	228	0.49
Blank votes			548	1.19	739	1.59
Total votes			45,885	100.00	46,548	100.00
Registered voters/turnout			67,916	67.56	67,925	68.53

=== 3rd constituency ===
Candidate	Party or alliance		First round		Second round	
Candidate	Party or alliance		Votes	%	Votes	%
Frédéric Weber	National Rally		19,938	43.46	23,252	53.63
Martine Etienne	New Popular Front	La France Insoumise	13,068	28.49	20,104	46.37
Valérie Maurice	Ensemble	Renaissance	8,248	17.98		
Mathieu Servagi	The Republicans		3,599	7.85		
Xavier Boury	Far-left	Lutte Ouvrière	1,022	2.23		
Total			45,875	100.00	43,356	100.00
Valid votes			45,875	97.32	43,356	91.09
Invalid votes			365	0.77	964	2.03
Blank votes			896	1.90	3,279	6.89
Total votes			47,136	100.00	47,599	100.00
Registered voters/turnout			80,382	58.64	80,358	59.23

=== 4th constituency ===
Candidate	Party or alliance		First round		Second round	
Candidate	Party or alliance		Votes	%	Votes	%
Dominique Bilde	National Rally		27,618	43.70	30,213	47.70
Thibault Bazin	The Republicans		20,984	33.21	33,130	52.30
Barbara Bertozzi Bievelot	New Popular Front	The Ecologists	13,009	20.59		
Geneviève Heilliette	Far-left	Lutte Ouvrière	864	1.37		
Valérie Cantiget	Reconquête		719	1.14		
Total			63,194	100.00	63,343	100.00
Valid votes			63,194	97.51	63,343	96.33
Invalid votes			506	0.78	603	0.92
Blank votes			1,105	1.71	1,813	2.76
Total votes			64,805	100.00	65,759	100.00
Registered voters/turnout			96,430	67.20	96,419	68.20

=== 5th constituency ===
Candidate	Party or alliance		First round		Second round	
Candidate	Party or alliance		Votes	%	Votes	%
Dominique Potier	New Popular Front	Socialist Party	22,415	43.47	28,073	54.73
Louis-Joseph Pecher	Union of the far right	The Republicans	15,704	30.45	23,217	45.27
Quentin Vinot	The Republicans		7,220	14.00		
Pierre-Nicolas Nups	Far-right	Independent	5,190	10.06		
Miriam Aubert	Far-left	Lutte Ouvrière	792	1.54		
Edouard Mathieu	Independent		244	0.47		
Total			51,565	100.00	51,290	100.00
Valid votes			51,565	96.96	51,290	95.52
Invalid votes			452	0.85	535	1.00
Blank votes			1,163	2.19	1,872	3.49
Total votes			53,180	100.00	53,697	100.00
Registered voters/turnout			78,674	67.60	78,691	68.24

=== 6th constituency ===
Candidate	Party or alliance		First round		Second round	
Candidate	Party or alliance		Votes	%	Votes	%
Anthony Boulogne	National Rally		24,121	44.53	28,024	54.64
Caroline Fiat	New Popular Front	La France Insoumise	14,479	26.73	23,264	45.36
Ergun Toparslan	Ensemble	Renaissance	8,353	15.42		
Jordan Simon	The Republicans		4,700	8.68		
Richard Nowak	Ecologists		1,133	2.09		
Corinne Morel	Far-left	Lutte Ouvrière	718	1.33		
Sonia Thirion	Sovereigntist right	Debout la France	664	1.23		
Total			54,168	100.00	51,288	100.00
Valid votes			54,168	97.25	51,288	91.58
Invalid votes			442	0.79	961	1.72
Blank votes			1,090	1.96	3,752	6.70
Total votes			55,700	100.00	56,001	100.00
Registered voters/turnout			87,566	63.61	87,576	63.95
