= Carole Grandjean =

French politician (born 1983)

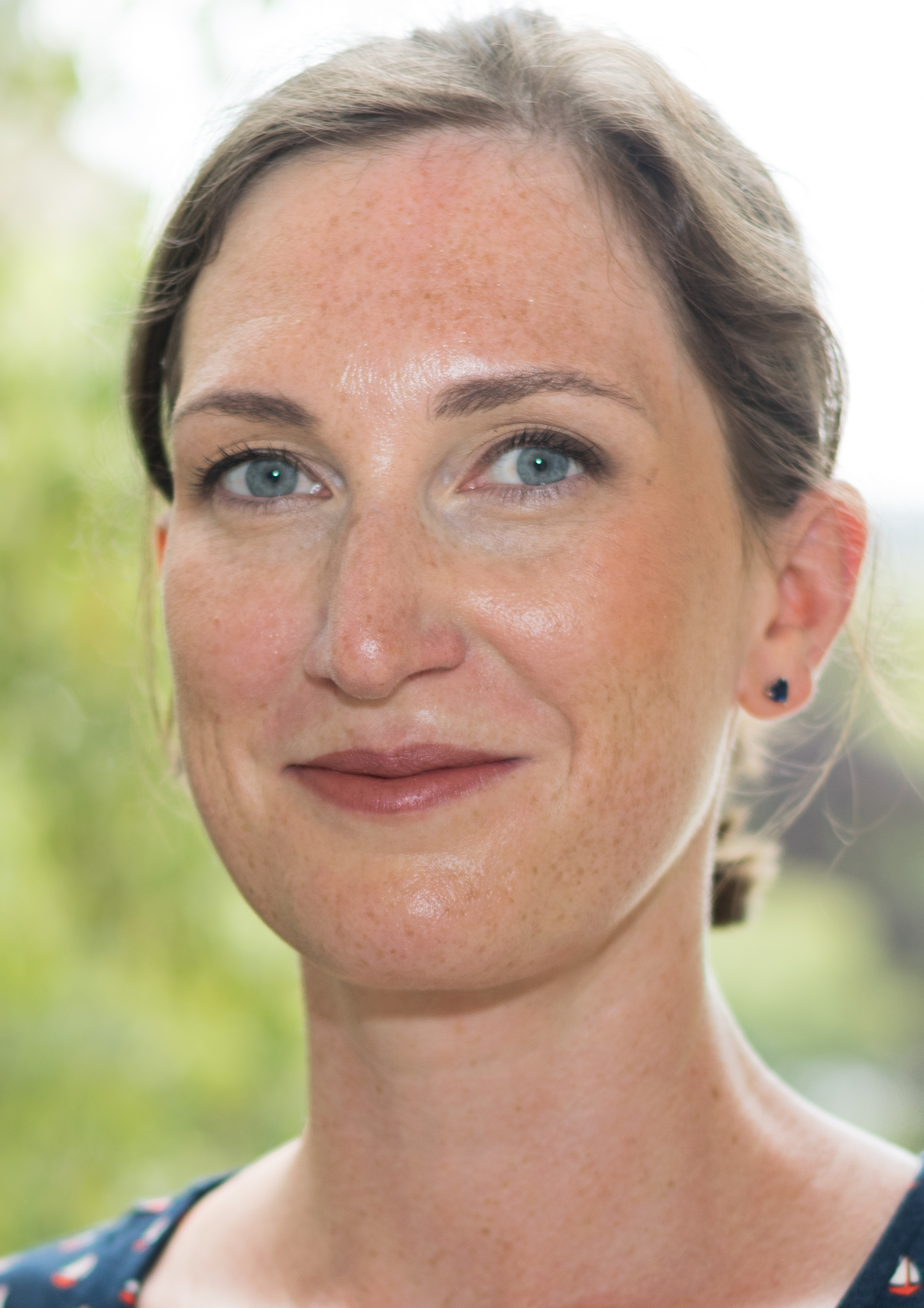

Member of the National Assembly for Meurthe-et-Moselle's 1st constituency
- In office 12 February 2024 – 9 June 2024
- Preceded by: Philippe Guillemard
- Succeeded by: Estelle Mercier
- In office 21 June 2017 – 4 July 2022
- Preceded by: Chaynesse Khirouni
- Succeeded by: Philippe Guillemard

Minister Delegate for Education and Vocational Training
- In office 4 July 2022 – 11 January 2024
- Prime Minister: Élisabeth Borne
- Preceded by: Clotilde Valter
- Succeeded by: Position abolished

Personal details
- Born: 18 May 1983 (age 43) Suresnes, France
- Party: Renaissance
- Education: Lille University of Science and Technology

Carole Grandjean (born 18 May 1983) is a French politician of Renaissance (RE) who served as Minister Delegate for Education and Vocational Training in the Borne government from 2022 to 2024. From 2017 to 2022 and briefly in 2024, she was a member of the National Assembly, representing the first constituency of Meurthe-et-Moselle.

== Political career ==
=== Member of the National Assembly, 2017–2022 ===
In parliament, Grandjean served as member of the Committee on Social Affairs and the Committee on European Affairs. On the Committee on Social Affairs, she was her parliamentary group's co-rapporteur on the government's pension reform plans since 2020, alongside Guillaume Gouffier-Cha, Jacques Maire and Corinne Vignon.

In addition to her committee assignments, Grandjean was a member of the French-British Parliamentary Friendship Group. From 2019, she was also a member of the French delegation to the Franco-German Parliamentary Assembly.

=== Career in government, 2022–2024 ===
In October 2023, Grandjean participated in the first joint cabinet retreat of the German and French governments in Hamburg, chaired by Chancellor Olaf Scholz and President Emmanuel Macron.

== Political positions ==
In 2018, Grandjean joined other co-signatories around Sébastien Nadot in officially filing a request for a commission of inquiry into the legality of French weapons sales to the Saudi-led coalition fighting in Yemen, days before an official visit of Saudi Crown Prince Mohammed bin Salman to Paris.

In July 2019, Grandjean voted in favor of the French ratification of the European Union’s Comprehensive Economic and Trade Agreement (CETA) with Canada.

== See also ==
- 2017 French legislative election
