= Canton of Vandœuvre-lès-Nancy-Est =

Former canton in Meurthe-et-Moselle, France

Coordinates: 48°39′36″N 6°08′23″E

- Former canton
- Interactive map of Canton of Vandœuvre-lès-Nancy-Est
- Country: France
- Region: Grand Est
- Department: Meurthe-et-Moselle
- No. of communes: {{{nbcomm}}}
- Disbanded: 2015

Government
  - Representatives: Stéphane Hablot
- Population (2011): 14,195

The canton of Vandœuvre-lès-Nancy-Est (French: Canton de Vandœuvre-lès-Nancy-Est) is a former French canton located in the department of Meurthe-et-Moselle in the Lorraine region (now part of Grand Est). It was created in 1997, by splitting the canton of Vandœuvre-lès-Nancy, which also gave rise to the canton of Vandœuvre-lès-Nancy-Ouest.

The last general councillor from this canton was Stéphane Hablot (PS), elected in 1998.

== Composition ==
The canton of Vandœuvre-lès-Nancy-Est was made up of a fraction of the commune of Vandœuvre-lès-Nancy and had 14,195 inhabitants (2012 census without double counts).
