= Canton of Vandœuvre-lès-Nancy-Ouest =

Former canton in Meurthe-et-Moselle, France

Coordinates: 48°39′08″N 6°09′42″E

- Former canton
- Interactive map of Canton of Vandœuvre-lès-Nancy-Ouest
- Country: France
- Region: Grand Est
- Department: Meurthe-et-Moselle
- No. of communes: {{{nbcomm}}}
- Disbanded: 2015

Government
  - Representatives: Marc Saint-Denis
- Population (2012): 16,374

The canton of Vandœuvre-lès-Nancy-Ouest (French: Canton de Vandœuvre-lès-Nancy-Ouest) is a former French canton located in the department of Meurthe-et-Moselle in the Lorraine region (now part of Grand Est).

== Background ==
It was created in 1997, by splitting the canton of Vandœuvre-lès-Nancy, which also gave rise to the canton of Vandœuvre-lès-Nancy-Est.

The last general councillor from this canton was Marc Saint-Denis (MoDem), elected in 2008.

== Composition ==
The canton of Vandœuvre-lès-Nancy-Ouest was made up of a fraction of the commune of Vandœuvre-lès-Nancy and had 16,374 inhabitants (2012 census without double counts).
