= Canton of Nancy-Sud =

Former canton in Meurthe-et-Moselle, France

Coordinates: 48°40′59″N 6°09′56″E

- Former canton
- Interactive map of Canton of Nancy-Sud
- Country: France
- Region: Grand Est
- Department: Meurthe-et-Moselle
- No. of communes: {{{nbcomm}}}
- Disbanded: 2015

Government
  - Representatives: Nicole Creusot
- Population (2012): 22,858

The canton of Nancy-Sud (French: Canton de Nancy-Sud) is a former French canton located in the department of Meurthe-et-Moselle in the Lorraine region (now part of Grand Est). Created in 1879 from the canton of Nancy-Est, it was modified in 1973 to form the canton of Saint-Max and in 1997 during the creation of the canton of Malzéville.

The last general councillor from this canton was Nicole Creusot (PS), elected in 2004.

== Composition ==
The canton of Nancy-Sud was made up of a fraction of the commune of Nancy and had 22,858 inhabitants (2012 census without double counts).
