= Frouard =

- Commune
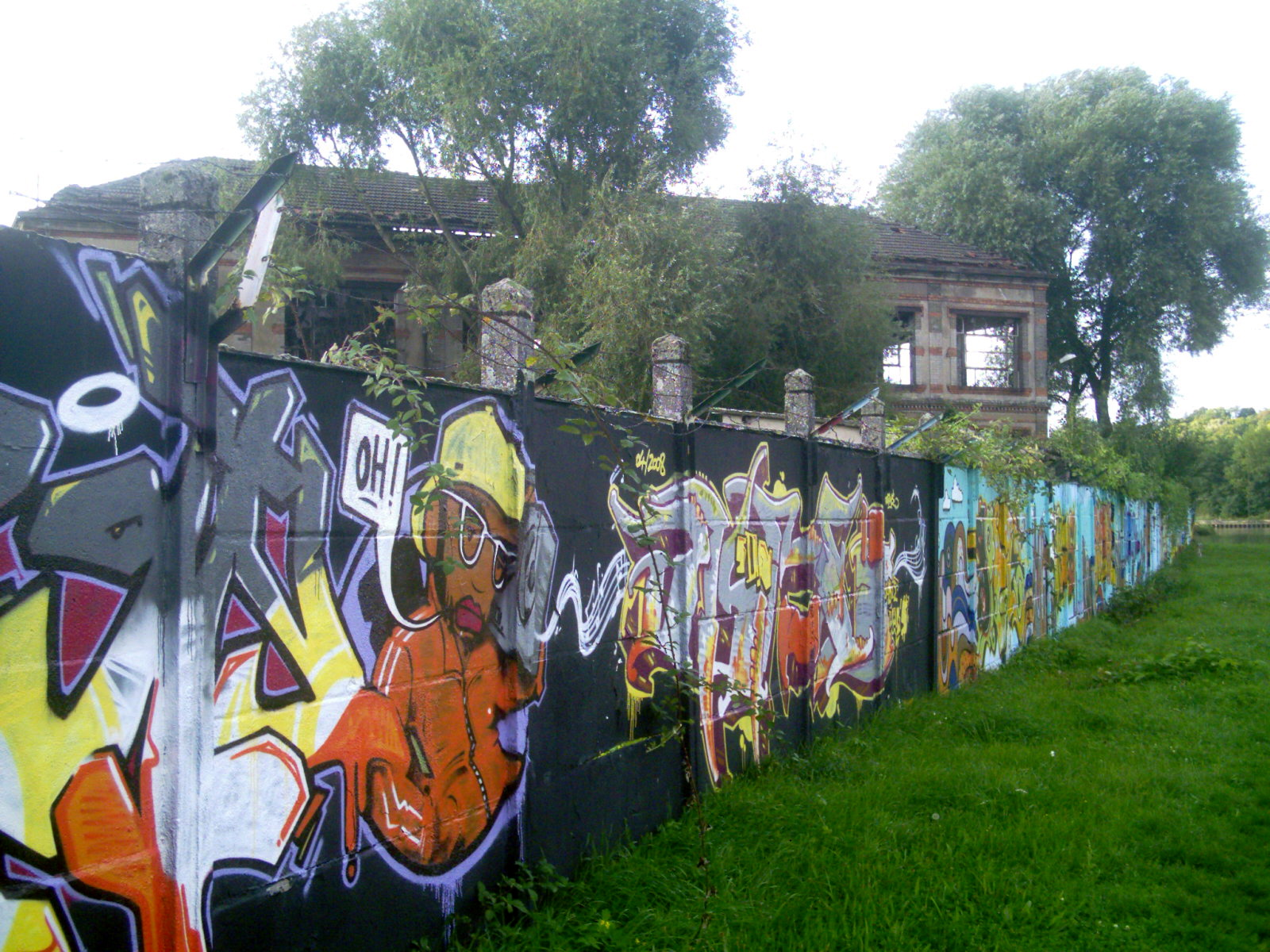
- Canalside Graffiti

- Coat of arms
- Location of Frouard
- Location within France Location within Grand Est
- Coordinates: 48°45′36″N 6°07′55″E
- Country: France
- Region: Grand Est
- Department: Meurthe-et-Moselle
- Arrondissement: Nancy
- Canton: Val de Lorraine Sud
- Intercommunality: CC Bassin de Pompey

Government
  - Mayor (2020–2026): Pascal Bartosik
- Area^{1}: 13.38 km^{2} (5.17 sq mi)
- Elevation: 215 m (705 ft)
- Highest elevation: 368 m (1,207 ft)
- Lowest elevation: 180 m (590 ft)
- Population (2023): 6,444
  - Density: 481.6/km^{2} (1,247/sq mi)
- Time zone: UTC+01:00 (CET)
  - Summer (DST): UTC+02:00 (CEST)
- INSEE/Postal code: 54215 /54390
- ^{1} French Land Register data, which excludes lakes, ponds, glaciers > 1 km^{2} (0.386 sq mi or 247 acres) and river estuaries.

Frouard (French pronunciation: [fʁuaʁ]) is a commune in the Meurthe-et-Moselle department in the region of Grand Est, north-eastern France. It is located 10 km north of Nancy near the confluence of the Moselle and Meurthe. It is noted for its Medieval mill; and was latterly a steel industry centre. It is today mainly known as an inland port, and rail/waterway node on the French Waterway Network.

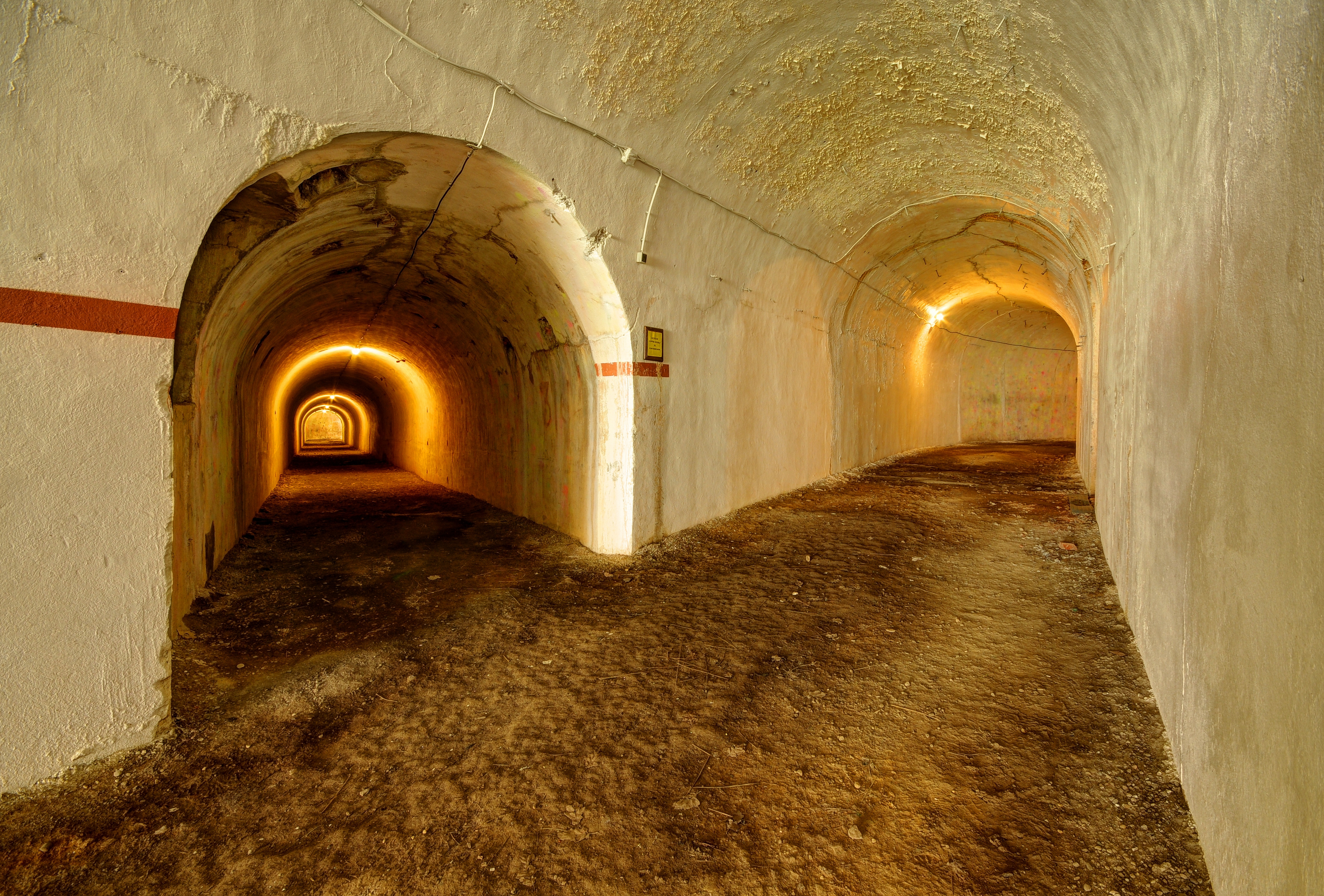
Batterie de l'Eperon

Frouard is joined by a bridge to Pompey on the opposite bank of the Moselle.

== Population ==
Historical population
Year	Pop.	±% p.a.
1968	7,419	—
1975	7,061	−0.70%
1982	7,589	+1.04%
1990	7,274	−0.53%
1999	6,999	−0.43%
2007	6,660	−0.62%
2012	6,727	+0.20%
2017	6,563	−0.49%
2023	6,444	−0.30%
Source: INSEE

== Astronomy ==
Minor planet 18635 Frouard is named after the town.

== See also ==
- Communes of the Meurthe-et-Moselle department
