= Cantons of the Meurthe-et-Moselle department =

The following is a list of the 23 cantons of the Meurthe-et-Moselle department, in France, following the French canton reorganisation which came into effect in March 2015:

- Baccarat
- Entre Seille et Meurthe
- Grand Couronné
- Jarny
- Jarville-la-Malgrange
- Laxou
- Longwy
- Lunéville-1
- Lunéville-2
- Meine au Saintois
- Mont-Saint-Martin
- Nancy-1
- Nancy-2
- Nancy-3
- Neuves-Maisons
- Le Nord-Toulois
- Pays de Briey
- Pont-à-Mousson
- Saint-Max
- Toul
- Val de Lorraine Sud
- Vandœuvre-lès-Nancy
- Villerupt
Before March 2015.

After March 2015.
