= Canton of Nancy-Est =

Former canton in Meurthe-et-Moselle, France

Coordinates: 48°41′54″N 6°08′59″E

- Former canton
- Interactive map of Canton of Nancy-Est
- Country: France
- Region: Grand Est
- Department: Meurthe-et-Moselle
- No. of communes: {{{nbcomm}}}
- Disbanded: 2015

Government
  - Representatives: Dominique Olivier
- Population (2012): 27,808

The canton of Nancy-Est (French: Canton de Nancy-Est) is a former French canton located in the department of Meurthe-et-Moselle in the Lorraine region (now part of Grand Est). It was modified in 1879 to form the canton of Nancy-Sud, then in 1997 for the creation of the canton of Malzéville.

The last general councillor from this canton was Dominique Olivier (PS), elected in 2004.

== Composition ==
The canton of Nancy-Est was made up of a fraction of the commune of Nancy and had 27,808 inhabitants (2012 census without double counts).
