= Caroline Fiat =

French politician (born 1977)

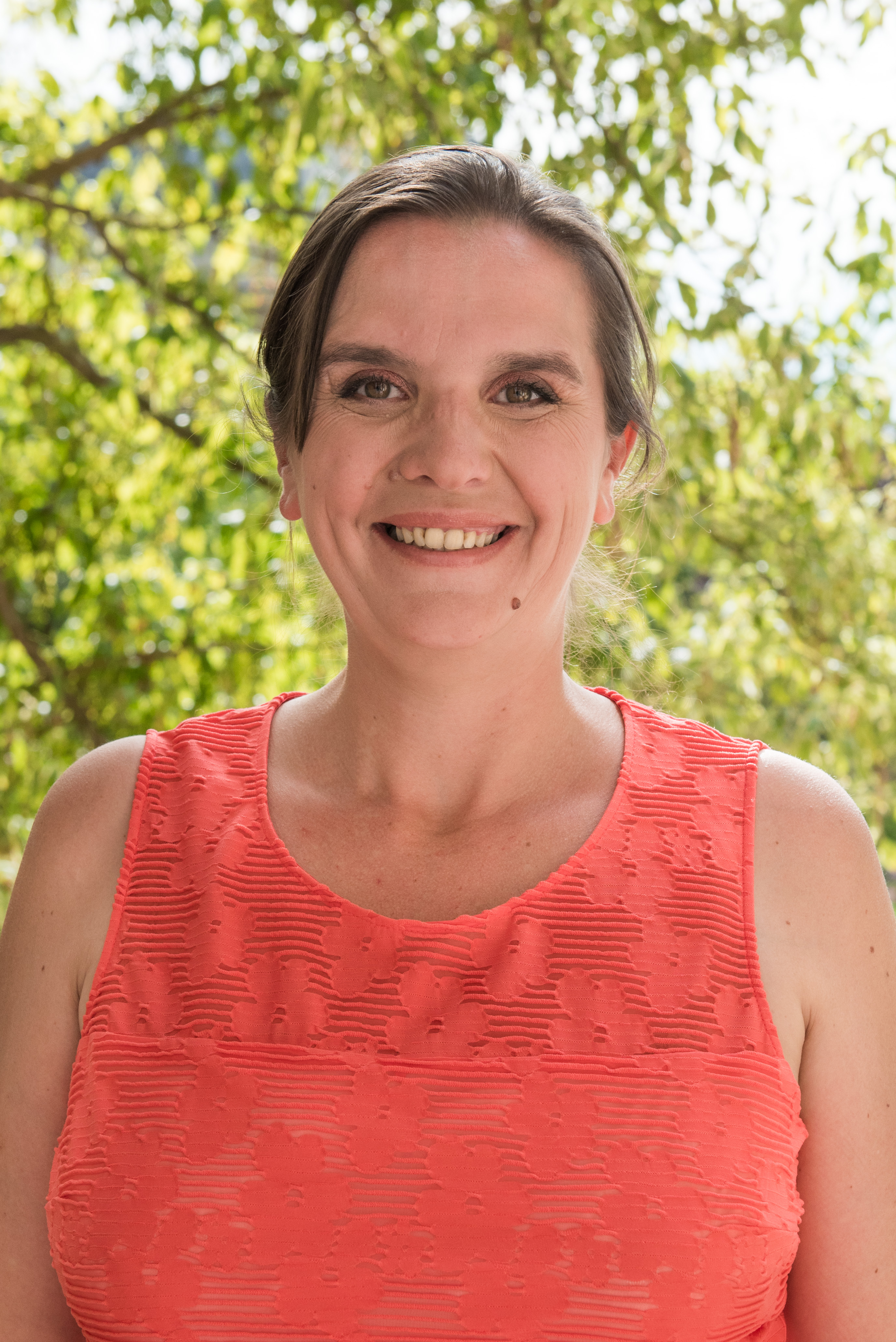
- Fiat in 2017

Member of the National Assembly for Meurthe-et-Moselle's 6th constituency
- In office 21 June 2017 – 9 June 2024
- Preceded by: Jean-Yves Le Déaut
- Succeeded by: Anthony Boulogne

Member of the Departmental Council of Meurthe-et-Moselle for the canton of Jarny
- Incumbent
- Assumed office 1 July 2021 Serving with Jacky Zanardo
- Preceded by: Manuela Ribeiro

Personal details
- Born: Caroline Paulette Yvette Nicolas; 28 January 1977 (age 49) Verdun, France
- Party: La France Insoumise (2016–present)
- Other political affiliations: French Communist Party (formerly)

Caroline Paulette Yvette Fiat (French pronunciation: [kaʁɔlin fjat]; née Nicolas, 28 January 1977) is a French medical caregiver and politician who represented the 6th constituency of the Meurthe-et-Moselle department in the National Assembly from 2017 to 2024. From 2022 to 2024, she held one of the National Assembly's six vice presidencies. Fiat is a member of La France Insoumise, having previously been an activist with the French Communist Party.

== Biography ==
Since 2009, Caroline Fiat has worked as a caregiver in several private-sector Établissements d'hébergement pour personnes âgées dépendantes (EHPADs) in Grand Est. She is the first caregiver to sit in the National Assembly. Fiat has also been an ambulance driver, telemarketer, commercial assistant and executive assistant during her career.

=== Entry into politics ===
Fiat grew up in a family of unionists of the General Confederation of Labour (CGT) and members of the French Communist Party (PCF). In the 2012 French presidential election, she voted "halfheartedly" for Jean-Luc Mélenchon, expressing disapproval for the "loudmouth and lecturing side" of his personality. Later, Fiat changed her opinion of him, joining first Ensemble! and then La France Insoumise (LFI), which was founded by Mélenchon in 2016. Ideologically, Fiat defines herself as a communist.

=== Member of the National Assembly ===
Fiat was elected as a deputy in the National Assembly in the 6th constituency of Meurthe-et-Moselle in the 2017 legislative election, receiving 61.36% of the vote in the second round against Cédric Marsolle of the National Front (FN), who had come first in the first round. On 27 June 2017, Fiat ran for the presidency of the National Assembly, supported by LFI and the PCF. She won 30 votes, finishing in last place behind Laurence Dumont with 32 votes, Laure de La Raudière with 34 votes, Jean-Charles Taugourdeau with 94 votes and the François de Rugy, who won with 353 votes.

In September 2017, Fiat was sued by one of her former parliamentary assistants, who contested their firing from Fiat's staff and demanded a resumption of his job contract.

Fiat served alongside Monique Iborra of La République En Marche! (LREM) as the co-rapporteur of a fact-finding mission on EHPADs, which published its conclusions in March 2018. The report recommended a doubling of the number of caregivers and an investment of 8 billion more euros in EHPADs over four years. On 1 February 2018, she spoke in favour of a bill on the right to euthanasia and assisted suicide which was ultimately suspended in the National Assembly. Fiat also introduced a bill aiming to ban excess medical fees aiming to improve access to healthcare in 2019.

In addition to being a full member of the La France Insoumise group in the National Assembly, Fiat is part of the Republican and Socialist Left (GRS), which was founded in 2019 by Emmanuel Maurel and Marie-Noëlle Lienemann after splitting from the Socialist Party (PS).

On 26 February 2020, Fiat received the 2019 Transparency in Pharmaceutical Policy Award for France. The award was given to her by the Observatory for Transparency in Pharmaceutical Policy in recognition of her efforts to promote transparency during debate over a social security appropriations bill for 2020.

Upon the beginning of the COVID-19 pandemic in March 2020, Fiat returned to her work as a caregiver. For almost a month, she worked at night in an intensive care unit at the Regional University Hospital Centre of Nancy while performing her parliamentary duties in the afternoon. During this period, Fiat observed what she described as a deep decline in public hospital conditions and signed a petition in L'Humanité on the topic. She also proposed at the start of 2021 to grant the same "post-COVID" pay bonus to caregivers in medical-social establishments as those in hospitals.

On 28 July 2020, during debate on a bioethics bill that would open assisted reproductive technology to all women, she gave a widely discussed speech where she related her own experiences on the topic.

On 10 May 2022, Fiat was re-nominated by La France Insoumise as its candidate for Meurthe-et-Moselle's 6th constituency in the 2022 French legislative elections. On 14 May 2022, she officially launched her campaign for re-election in Blénod-lès-Pont-à-Mousson. Fiat announced Julien Hézard, the Communist secretary-general of the Meurthe-et-Moselle CGT and deputy mayor of Blénod, as her designated substitute.

== Works ==
- Fiat, Caroline; Obono, Danièle; Cukier, Alexis; Douat, Etienne (2018). Insoumises à l'Assemblée : Caroline Fiat, Danièle Obono (in French). Paris. ISBN 978-2-84303-295-0. OCLC 1077226128.
