= Meurthe-et-Moselle's 6th constituency =

Constituency of the National Assembly of France

6th constituency of Meurthe-et-Moselle
- inline Constituency of the National Assembly of France

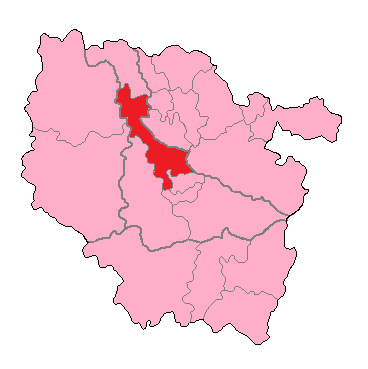
- Meurthe-et-Moselle's 6thConstituency shown within Lorraine
- Deputy: Anthony Boulogne; RN
- Department: Meurthe-et-Moselle
- Cantons: Chambley-Bussières, Conflans-en-Jarnisy, Dieulouard, Homécourt, Nomeny, Pompey, Pont-à-Mousson, communes d'Arnaville, Bayonville-sur-Mad, Vandelainville (part)
- Registered voters: 87,344

The 6th constituency of Meurthe-et-Moselle is a French legislative constituency in the Meurthe-et-Moselle département.

== Description ==
Meurthe-et-Moselle's 6th constituency stretches from the north of Nancy through the centre of the department roughly following the course of the river Moselle. It includes the towns of Pompey and Pont-à-Mousson.

From 1988 to 2017 the seat was held by Jean-Yves Le Déaut of the Socialist Party.

== Historic Representation ==
Election	Member	Party
1986	Proportional representation – no election by constituency	
1988	Jean-Yves Le Déaut	PS
1993	Jean-Yves Le Déaut	PS
1997	Jean-Yves Le Déaut	PS
2002	Jean-Yves Le Déaut	PS
2007	Jean-Yves Le Déaut	PS
2012	Jean-Yves Le Déaut	PS
2017	Caroline Fiat	LFI
2022	Caroline Fiat	LFI
2024	Anthony Boulogne	National Rally

== Election results ==
=== 2024 ===
Legislative Election 2024: Meurthe-et-Moselle's 6th constituency
Party	Candidate	Votes	%	±%
LO	Dominique Barbin	718	1.33	N/A
ÉAC	Richard Nowak	1,133	2.09	N/A
RE (Ensemble)	Ergun Topaarslan	8,353	15.42	−2.77
LR	Jordan Simon	4,700	8.68	−1.00
RN	Anthony Boulogne	24,121	44.53	+16.05
DLF	Sonia Thirion	664	1.23	N/A
LFI (NFP)	Caroline Fiat	14,479	26.73	−3.24
Turnout		54,169	97.25	+54.13
Registered electors		87,566		
2nd round result
RN	Anthony Boulogne	28,024	54.64	+10.11
LFI	Caroline Fiat	23,264	45.36	+18.63
Turnout		51,288	91.58	−5.67
Registered electors		87,576		
RN gain from PS				

=== 2022 ===
Legislative Election 2022: Meurthe-et-Moselle's 6th constituency
Party	Candidate	Votes	%	±%
LFI (NUPÉS)	Caroline Fiat	11,048	29.97	-3.07
RN	Anthony Boulogne	10,501	28.48	+8.56
LREM (Ensemble)	Ergün Toparslan	6,705	18.19	N/A
LR (UDC)	Jonathan Richier	3,570	9.68	−2.78
LREM	Olivier Hedin*	1,736	4.71	N/A
REC	Jeanne Amann	1,149	3.12	N/A
PA	Xavier Coupaye	741	2.01	N/A
Others	N/A	1,415	-	−
Turnout		36,867	43.12	+0.35
2nd round result
LFI (NUPÉS)	Caroline Fiat	16,133	50.23	-11.13
RN	Anthony Boulogne	15,984	49.77	N/A
Turnout		32,117	41.62	+3.22
LFI hold				

* Dissident LREM candidate, not supported by Ensemble Citoyens alliance.

=== 2017 ===
Candidate	Label	First round		Second round	
Candidate	Label	Votes	%	Votes	%
Cédric Marsolle	FN	7,275	19.92	11,192	38.64
Caroline Fiat	FI	5,821	15.94	17,772	61.36
Hélène Rossinot	DIV	5,456	14.94		
Rachel Thomas	DVG	4,657	12.75		
Lise Roseleur	LR	4,550	12.46		
Julien Vaillant	PS	3,867	10.59		
Éric Monnini	PCF	1,497	4.10		
Stéphane Leonardi	ECO	879	2.41		
Dorian Manzoli	DLF	694	1.90		
Séverine Fontan	ECO	685	1.88		
Dominique Barbin	EXG	346	0.95		
Christian Seckinger	DIV	245	0.67		
Frédéric Thomas	ECO	213	0.58		
Joe Labat	ECO	189	0.52		
Jean Dubessy	EXG	134	0.37		
Laurence Quéré	DVD	5	0.01		
Votes		36,513	100.00	28,964	100.00
Valid votes		36,513	97.48	28,964	86.16
Blank votes		686	1.83	3,546	10.55
Null votes		256	0.68	1,108	3.30
Turnout		37,455	42.77	33,618	38.40
Abstentions		50,125	57.23	53,927	61.60
Registered voters		87,580		87,545	
Source: Ministry of the Interior

=== 2012 ===
Legislative Election 2012: Meurthe-et-Moselle's 6th constituency
Party	Candidate	Votes	%	±%
PS	Jean-Yves Le Deaut	20,273	43.65	
UMP	Stéphane Pizelle	10,208	21.98	
FN	Jean-Luc Manoury	8,937	19.24	
FG	Julie Meunier	3,688	7.94	
EELV	Ahmed Remaoun	1,240	2.67	
Others	N/A	2,103		
Turnout		46,449	53.18	
2nd round result
PS	Jean-Yves Le Deaut	26,957	63.58	
UMP	Stéphane Pizelle	15,442	36.42	
Turnout		42,399	48.54	
PS hold				

== Sources ==
Official results of French elections from 2002: "Résultats électoraux officiels en France" (in French).
