= Departmental Council of Meurthe-et-Moselle =

Departmental legislature in France

Departmental Council of Meurthe-et-Moselle Conseil départemental de Meurthe-et-Moselle
- Flag of the Council

Leadership
- President: Chaynesse Khirouni, PS since 1 July 2021

Meeting place
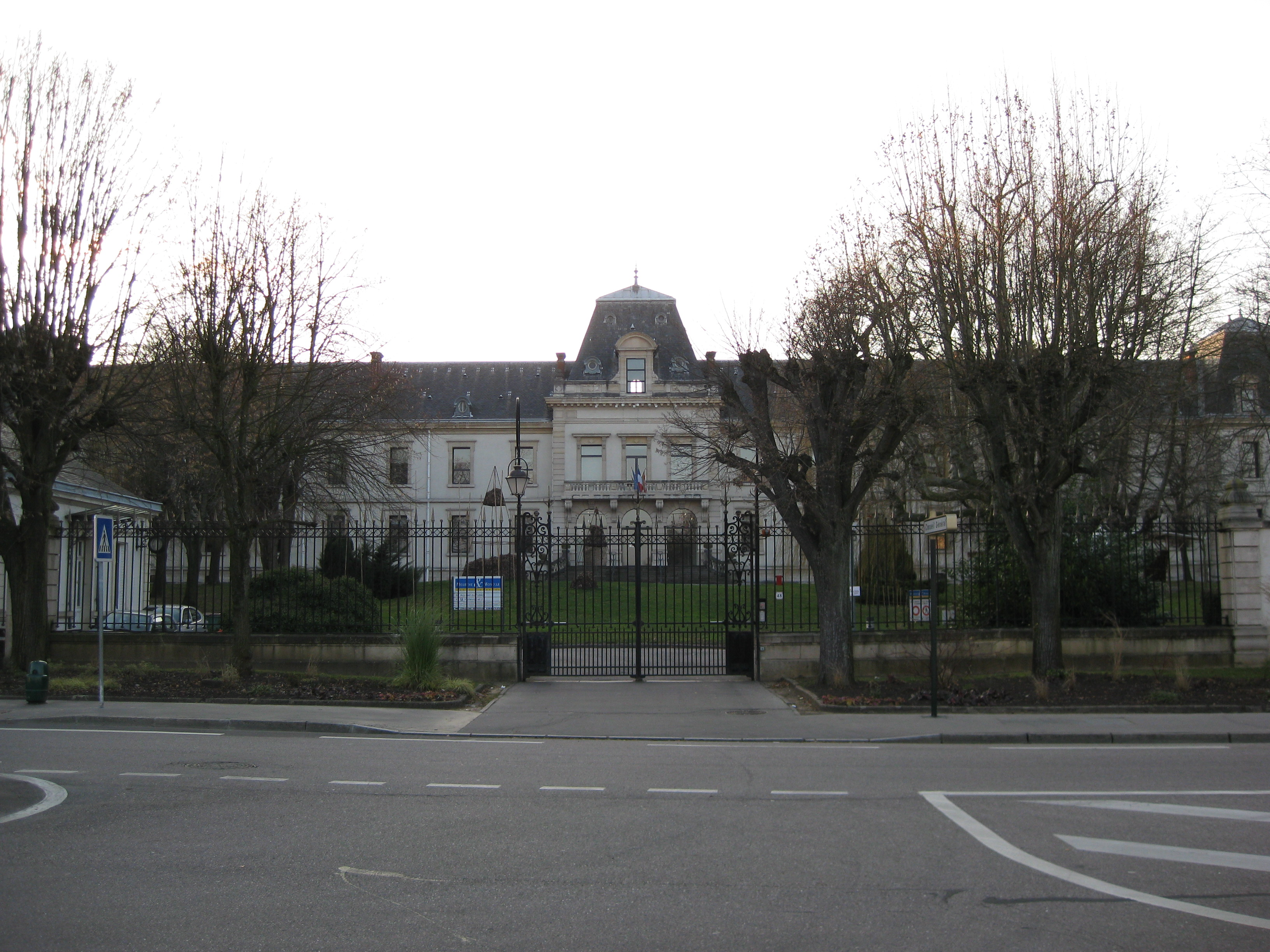
- Old Sédillot military hospital, Nancy

The Departmental Council of Meurthe-et-Moselle (French: Conseil départemental de Meurthe-et-Moselle) is the deliberative assembly of the French department of Meurthe-et-Moselle. It sits in the former Sédillot military hospital in Nancy.

== Composition ==
Results of the 2021 departmental elections by canton in Meurthe-et-Moselle

The departmental council of Meurthe-et-Moselle includes 46 departmental councilors elected from the 23 cantons of Meurthe-et-Moselle.

Composition by party (as of 2021)
Party	Acronym	Seats	Groups
Majority (30 seats)
Socialist Party	PS	11	Union à gauche avec des écologistes; (transl. Union of the Left and Ecologists)
Miscellaneous left	DVG	8	Union à gauche avec des écologistes; (transl. Union of the Left and Ecologists)
Europe Ecology – The Greens	EELV	3	Union à gauche avec des écologistes; (transl. Union of the Left and Ecologists)
French Communist Party	PCF	5	Union à gauche avec des écologistes; (transl. Union of the Left and Ecologists)
La France Insoumise	LFI	3	Union à gauche avec des écologistes; (transl. Union of the Left and Ecologists)
Opposition (16 seats)
The Republicans	LR	9	Union of the Right and Centre
Union of Democrats and Independents	UDI	2	Union of the Right and Centre
Miscellaneous right	DVD	2	Union of the Right and Centre
Radical Movement	MR	1	Union of the Right and Centre
Democratic Movement	MoDem	1	Union of the Right and Centre
Miscellaneous centre	DVC	1	Union of the Right and Centre

== Executive ==
=== President ===
On 1 July 2021, Chaynesse Khirouni was elected president of the departmental council, winning against Valérie Beausert-Leick.

=== Vice-presidents ===
In addition to the president, the executive has 13 vice-presidents.

Vice-presidents of the Departmental Council of Meurthe-et-Moselle (since 2021)
Order	Name	Party	Canton (constituency)	Delegation
1st	Catherine Boursier	PS	Entre Seille et Meurthe	Autonomy
2nd	André Corzani	PCF	Pays de Briey	Territorial development
3rd	Marie-José Amah	PS	Val de Lorraine Sud	Child protection and family
4th	Antony Caps	EELV	Entre Seille et Meurthe	Territorial attractiveness
5th	Rosemary Lupo	LFI	Pays de Briey	Prevention, PMI and health
6th	Jacky Zanardo	PCF	Jarny	Youth and education
7th	Audrey Bardot	PS	Neuves-Maisons	Infrastructure and mobility
8th	Pascal Schneider	PS	Neuves-Maisons	Finances
9th	Silvana Silvani	PCF	Nancy-3	Social integration
10th	Sylvain Mariette	EELV	Nancy-1	Ecological transition and citizen participation
11th	Michele Pilot	PS	Toul	Human resources
12th	Vincent Hamen	PS	Longwy	Cross-border and international relations
13th	Sylvie Cruchant-Duval	PS	Vandœuvre-lès-Nancy	Culture and higher education
