= Marbache =

- Commune
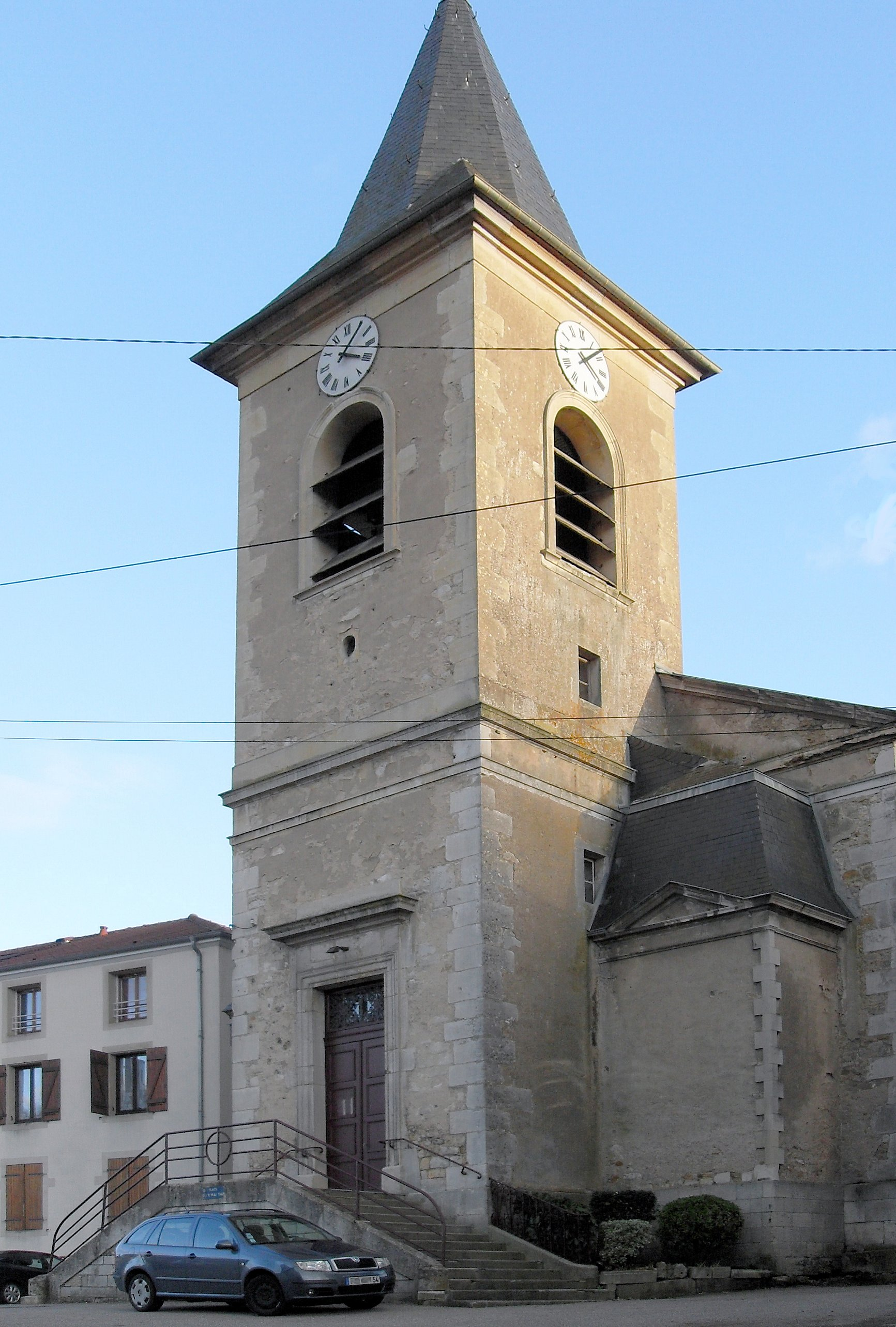
- The church in Marbache

- Coat of arms
- Location of Marbache
- Location within France Location within Grand Est
- Coordinates: 48°47′52″N 6°06′11″E
- Country: France
- Region: Grand Est
- Department: Meurthe-et-Moselle
- Arrondissement: Nancy
- Canton: Val de Lorraine Sud
- Intercommunality: CC Bassin de Pompey

Government
  - Mayor (2020–2026): Jean-Jacques Maxant
- Area^{1}: 10.63 km^{2} (4.10 sq mi)
- Elevation: 295 m (968 ft)
- Highest elevation: 361 m (1,184 ft)
- Lowest elevation: 182 m (597 ft)
- Population (2023): 1,665
  - Density: 156.6/km^{2} (405.7/sq mi)
- Time zone: UTC+01:00 (CET)
  - Summer (DST): UTC+02:00 (CEST)
- INSEE/Postal code: 54351 /54820
- ^{1} French Land Register data, which excludes lakes, ponds, glaciers > 1 km^{2} (0.386 sq mi or 247 acres) and river estuaries.

Marbache (French pronunciation: [maʁbaʃ]) is a commune in the Meurthe-et-Moselle department in northeastern France.

== History ==
One of the first references to Marbache is dated 896, written by Zwentibold, 1st Duke of Lotharingia, who called it "Merbechia". It becomes "Marbage" in 1181 and "Marbaiche" in 1333. In the 12th century a priory was built in Marbache by the Premonstratensians of the Abbaye de Sainte-Marie-au-Bois. There is an inscription carved in stone, dated 1141, above the entrance porch.

In 1850 Marbache was a small village of winegrowers. That year the railway was built past the village, and rock was extracted from the valley walls to obtain material for the railway bed. The rock contained iron, and after surveys the Société des Mines de Marbache was created to exploit it. The Pont-à-Mousson company was created in 1856 by a group of Lorraine businessmen to use the ore to manufacture cast iron. Xavier Rogé was the manager. In 1862 the enterprise was liquidated due to lack of sufficient capital to cover the high investment expenses.

Rogé managed to raise capital in the Saarland and restart the business, selling most of its production to forges in the Ardennes and Champagne. In 1866 Rogé visited England and became aware of the new and promising market for cast-iron water pipes. He focused the company on pipe production, and found a ready market when cities began to make large investment in water supply after 1871. Rogé was succeeded by Camille Cavallier, who transformed the moderately sized cast iron pipe manufacturer into a giant, always concentrating on making pipes. Mining at Marbache ended in 1957.

== See also ==
- Communes of the Meurthe-et-Moselle department
- Parc naturel régional de Lorraine

== Sources ==
- Dautrey, Jean, Patrimoine (in French)
- Gaston-Breton, Tristan (8 August 2005), "Camille Cavallier", Les Echos, Ces innovateurs ou ces aventuriers qui ont transforme l'economie
