= Gilbert Bouchet =

French politician (1947–2025)

Member of the French Senate for Drôme
- In office 1 October 2014 – 20 October 2025
- Succeeded by: Marie-Pierre Mouton

Mayor of Tain-l'Hermitage
- In office 19 June 1995 – 6 November 2017
- Preceded by: Maurice Alloncle
- Succeeded by: Xavier Angeli

Member of the General Council of Drôme for the Canton of Tain-l'Hermitage
- In office 3 April 1992 – 1 October 2014
- Preceded by: Maurice Alloncle
- Succeeded by: Annie Guibert

Personal details
- Born: 8 January 1947 La Voulte-sur-Rhône, France
- Died: 20 October 2025 (aged 78) Tain-l'Hermitage, France
- Political party: RPR (until 2002); UMP (2002–2015); LR (2015–2025)
- Occupation: Hotelier

Gilbert Bouchet (French: [ʒilbɛʁ buʃɛ]; 8 January 1947 – 20 October 2025) was a French politician of the Rally for the Republic (RPR), the Union for a Popular Movement (UMP), and The Republicans (LR).

A hotelier by profession, Bouchet served as president of the Syndicat des hôteliers de la Drôme and created one of the first labor unions in Tain-l'Hermitage in 1972. He served as mayor of Tain from 1995 to 2017 and served in the General Council of Drôme from 1992 to 2014. From 2014 until his death, he represented Drôme in the Senate. In 2017, he endorsed Laurent Wauquiez in the LR's leadership election.

In 2023, Bouchet announced that he was suffering from ALS while continuing his mandate as a senator. In 2024, he defended a bill aimed at improving the management of the disease. He died in Tain-l'Hermitage on 20 October 2025, at the age of 78.
