= Meurthe-et-Moselle's 4th constituency =

Constituency of the National Assembly of France

4th constituency of Meurthe-et-Moselle
- inline Constituency of the National Assembly of France

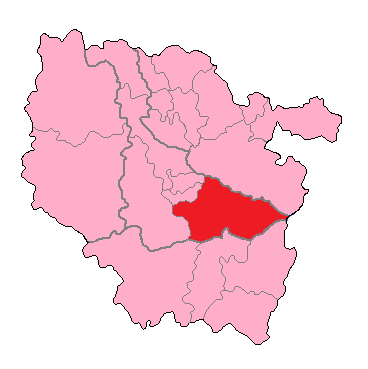
- Meurthe-et-Moselle's 4th Constituency shown within Lorraine
- Deputy: Thibault Bazin; LR
- Department: Meurthe-et-Moselle
- Cantons: Arracourt, Baccarat, Badonviller, Bayon, Blâmont, Cirey-sur-Vezouze, Gerbéviller, Lunéville-Nord, Lunéville-Sud, Saint-Nicolas-de-Port, Tomblaine
- Registered voters: 97,146

The 4th constituency of Meurthe-et-Moselle is a French legislative constituency in the Meurthe-et-Moselle département.

== Description ==
Meurthe-et-Moselle's 4th constituency covers the south east portion of the department, with Lunéville on the Meurthe river at its centre.

The constituency has been held by conservative Gaullists since 1993 but prior to that elected a Socialist in the 1988 election when the party was led by Michel Rocard and François Mitterrand. Since 2012 it has been the only seat held by the centre right in Meurthe-et-Moselle.

== Historic representation ==
Election	Member	Party
1986	Proportional representation – no election by constituency	
1988	Daniel Reiner	PS
1993	François Guillaume	RPR
1997	François Guillaume	RPR
2002	François Guillaume	UMP
2007	François Guillaume	UMP
2012	Jacques Lamblin	UMP
2017	Thibault Bazin	LR
2022	Thibault Bazin	LR

== Election results ==
=== 2024 ===
Legislative Election 2024: Meurthe-et-Moselle's 4th constituency
Party	Candidate	Votes	%	±%
DVD	Thibault Bazin	20984	33.21	+1.92
LÉ–EELV (NFP)	Barbara Bertozzi Bievelot	13009	20.59	−5.40
LO	Geneviève Heilliette	864	1.37	N/A
RN	Dominique Bilde	27618	43.70	+17.71
REC	Valérie Cantiget	719	1.14	−1.78
Turnout		63194	97.51	+50.03
Registered electors		96,430		
2nd round result
DVD	Thibault Bazin	33,130	52.30	+19.09
RN	Dominique Bilde	30213	47.70	+4.00
Turnout		63343	96.33	−1.18
Registered electors		96,419		
DVD hold		Swing		

=== 2022 ===
Legislative Election 2022: Meurthe-et-Moselle's 4th constituency
Party	Candidate	Votes	%	±%
LR (UDC)	Thibault Bazin	14,239	31.29	+6.64
RN	Dominique Bilde	11,825	25.99	+5.66
EELV (NUPÉS)	Barbara Bertozzi Bievelot	8,727	19.18	+3.15
LREM (Ensemble)	Rachel Thomas	7,170	15.76	−15.52
REC	Lucy Georges	1,329	2.92	N/A
Others	N/A	2,217	-	−
Turnout		45,507	47.48	−1.47
2nd round result
LR (UDC)	Thibault Bazin	24,952	62.18	+8.91
RN	Dominique Bilde	15,175	37.82	N/A
Turnout		40,127	43.90	+1.87
LR hold				

=== 2017 ===
Candidate	Label	First round		Second round	
Candidate	Label	Votes	%	Votes	%
Philippe Buzzi	REM	14,650	31.28	17,124	46.73
Thibault Bazin	LR	11,547	24.65	19,524	53.27
Dominique Bilde	FN	9,524	20.33		
Vincent Guenaire-Doazan	FI	5,189	11.08		
Marie-Neige Houchard	ECO	2,459	5.25		
Michel Noisette	DLF	913	1.95		
Fabien Niezgoda	ECO	663	1.42		
Geneviève Heilliette	EXG	468	1.00		
Vincent Jouanneau-Courville	EXD	467	1.00		
Bernard Buzelin	PRG	396	0.85		
Michel Claire	DIV	340	0.73		
Éric Parthuisot	DIV	222	0.47		
Votes		46,838	100.00	36,648	100.00
Valid votes		46,838	97.65	36,648	88.98
Blank votes		794	1.66	3,183	7.73
Null votes		332	0.69	1,357	3.29
Turnout		47,964	48.95	41,188	42.03
Abstentions		50,029	51.05	56,806	57.97
Registered voters		97,993		97,994	
Source: Ministry of the Interior

=== 2012 ===
Legislative Election 2012: Meurthe-et-Moselle's 4th constituency
Party	Candidate	Votes	%	±%
UMP	Jacques Lamblin	20,316	36.68	
EELV	Marie-Neige Houchard	18,348	33.13	
FN	Pascal Bauche	10,453	18.87	
FG	Claude Blaque	4,067	7.34	
Others	N/A	2,197		
Turnout		55,381	56.99	
2nd round result
UMP	Jacques Lamblin	28,755	53.49	
EELV	Marie-Neige Houchard	25,004	46.51	
Turnout		53,759	55.34	
UMP hold				

== Sources ==
Official results of French elections from 2002: "Résultats électoraux officiels en France" (in French).
