= Arrondissements of the Meurthe-et-Moselle department =

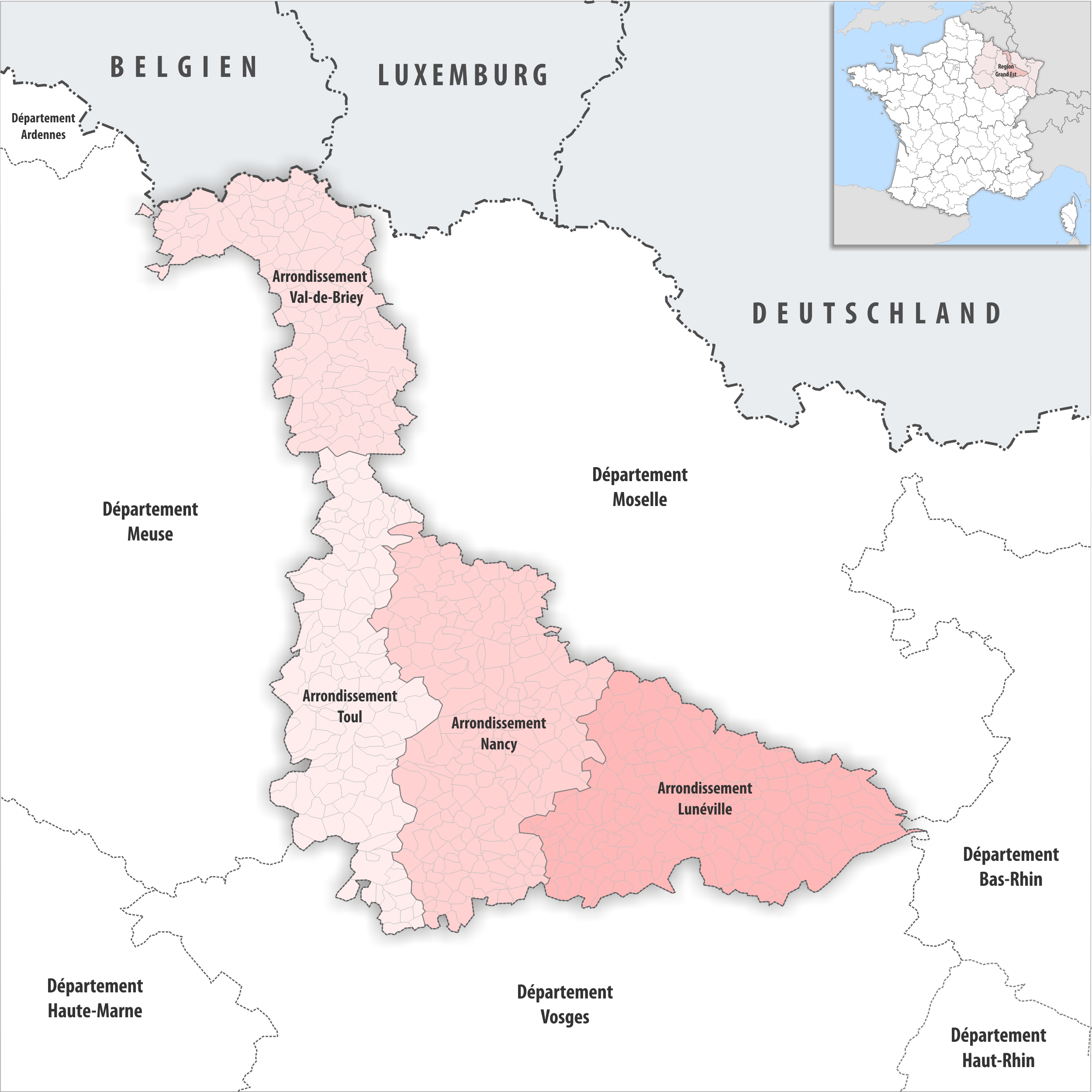
Map of arrondissements of the Meurthe-et-Moselle department.

The 4 arrondissements of the Meurthe-et-Moselle department are:

1. Arrondissement of Lunéville (subprefecture: Lunéville), with 162 communes. The population of the arrondissement was 74,722 in 2021.
2. Arrondissement of Nancy (prefecture of the Meurthe-et-Moselle department: Nancy), with 196 communes. The population of the arrondissement was 427,697 in 2021.
3. Arrondissement of Toul (subprefecture: Toul), with 118 communes. The population of the arrondissement was 65,665 in 2021.
4. Arrondissement of Val-de-Briey (subprefecture: Val de Briey), with 115 communes. The population of the arrondissement was 164,402 in 2021.

== History ==
In 1800 the arrondissements of Nancy, Château-Salins, Lunéville, Sarrebourg and Toul were established as subdivisions of the department Meurthe, and Briey as part of the department Moselle. In 1871 the parts of the departments Meurthe and Moselle that had not been ceded to Germany were combined in the new department Meurthe-et-Moselle, with the arrondissements of Nancy, Briey, Lunéville and Toul. The arrondissement of Toul was disbanded in 1926, and restored in 1943.

The borders of the arrondissements of Meurthe-et-Moselle were modified in January 2023:

- 13 communes from the arrondissement of Briey to the arrondissement of Toul
- two communes from the arrondissement of Nancy to the arrondissement of Toul
- eight communes from the arrondissement of Toul to the arrondissement of Nancy
- three communes from the arrondissement of Lunéville to the arrondissement of Nancy
- one commune from the arrondissement of Nancy to the arrondissement of Lunéville

In addition, the arrondissement of Briey was renamed arrondissement of Val-de-Briey.
