= Champey-sur-Moselle =

- Commune
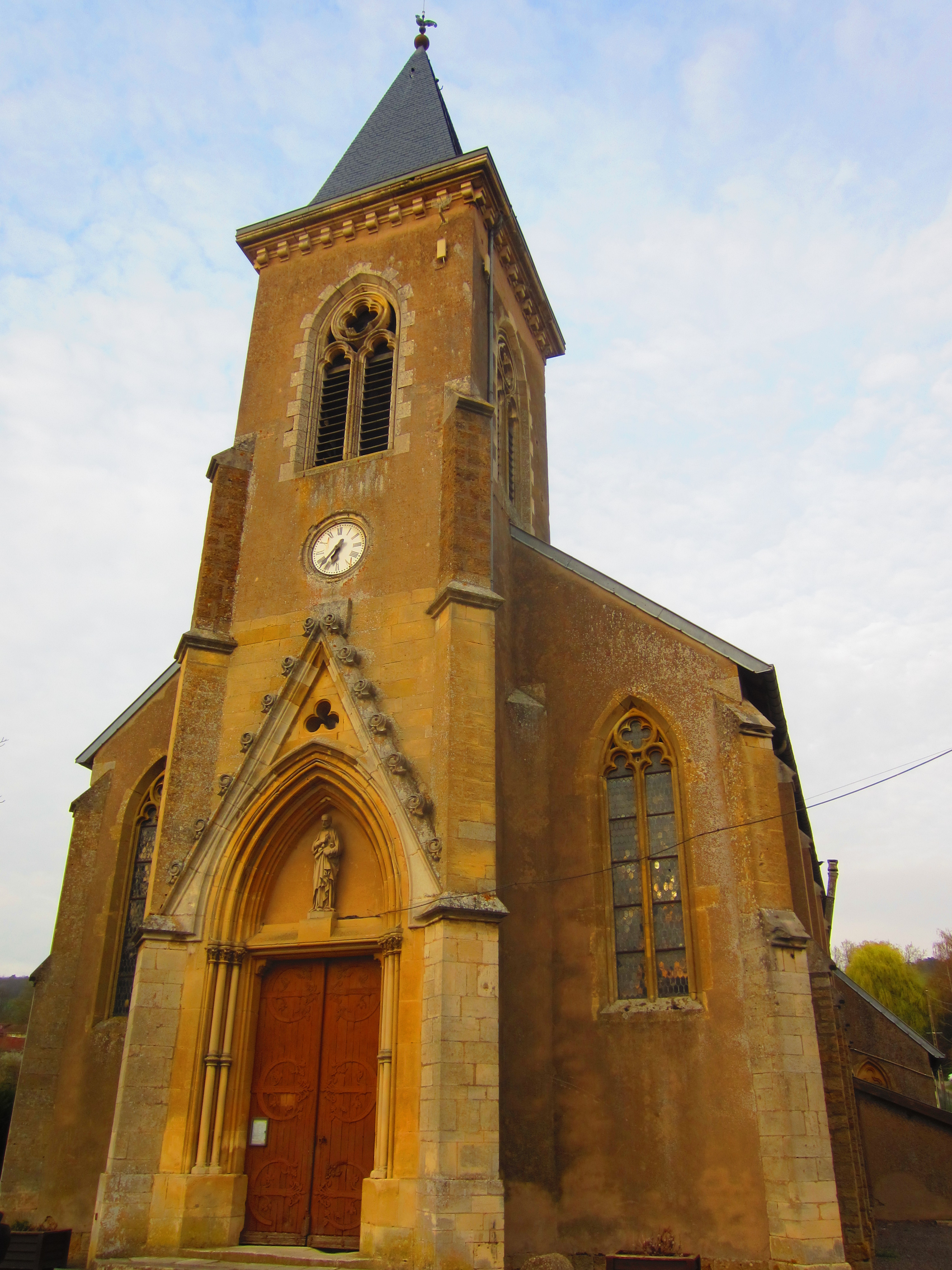
- The church in Champey-sur-Moselle

- Coat of arms
- Location of Champey-sur-Moselle
- Location within France Location within Grand Est
- Coordinates: 48°57′28″N 6°03′31″E
- Country: France
- Region: Grand Est
- Department: Meurthe-et-Moselle
- Arrondissement: Nancy
- Canton: Pont-à-Mousson
- Intercommunality: CC Bassin de Pont-à-Mousson

Government
  - Mayor (2020–2026): Jean-Marie Milano
- Area^{1}: 2.42 km^{2} (0.93 sq mi)
- Elevation: 184 m (604 ft)
- Highest elevation: 394 m (1,293 ft)
- Lowest elevation: 173 m (568 ft)
- Population (2023): 315
  - Density: 130/km^{2} (337/sq mi)
- Time zone: UTC+01:00 (CET)
  - Summer (DST): UTC+02:00 (CEST)
- INSEE/Postal code: 54114 /54700
- ^{1} French Land Register data, which excludes lakes, ponds, glaciers > 1 km^{2} (0.386 sq mi or 247 acres) and river estuaries.

Champey-sur-Moselle (French pronunciation: [ʃɑ̃pɛ syʁ mɔzɛl], literally Champey on Moselle) is a commune in the Meurthe-et-Moselle department in north-eastern France.

== See also ==
- Communes of the Meurthe-et-Moselle department
