= Maxéville =

- Commune
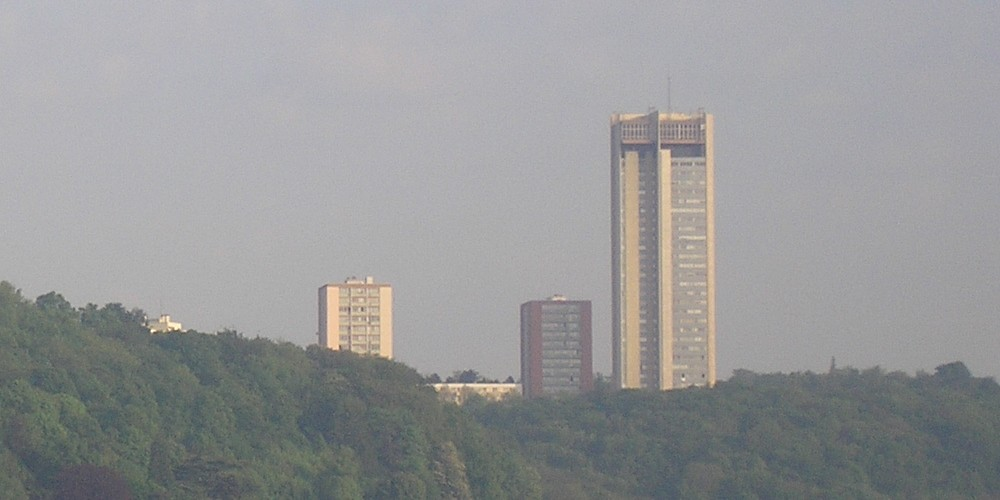
- Tour panoramique, les Aulnes

- Coat of arms
- Location of Maxéville
- Location within France Location within Grand Est
- Coordinates: 48°42′44″N 6°09′50″E
- Country: France
- Region: Grand Est
- Department: Meurthe-et-Moselle
- Arrondissement: Nancy
- Canton: Val de Lorraine Sud
- Intercommunality: Métropole du Grand Nancy

Government
  - Mayor (2020–2026): Christophe Choserot
- Area^{1}: 5.63 km^{2} (2.17 sq mi)
- Elevation: 225 m (738 ft)
- Highest elevation: 365 m (1,198 ft)
- Lowest elevation: 189 m (620 ft)
- Population (2023): 10,090
  - Density: 1,790/km^{2} (4,640/sq mi)
- Time zone: UTC+01:00 (CET)
  - Summer (DST): UTC+02:00 (CEST)
- INSEE/Postal code: 54357 /54320
- Website: www.mairie-maxeville.fr
- ^{1} French Land Register data, which excludes lakes, ponds, glaciers > 1 km^{2} (0.386 sq mi or 247 acres) and river estuaries.

Maxéville (French pronunciation: [maksevil] or [maʃevil]) is a commune in the Meurthe-et-Moselle department in north-eastern France.

== Population ==
Historical population
Year	Pop.	±% p.a.
1968	6,354	—
1975	9,425	+5.79%
1982	8,910	−0.80%
1990	8,667	−0.35%
1999	8,978	+0.39%
2007	8,919	−0.08%
2012	9,729	+1.75%
2017	9,814	+0.17%
2023	10,090	+0.46%
Source: INSEE

== See also ==
- Communes of the Meurthe-et-Moselle department
