= Thibault Bazin =

French politician

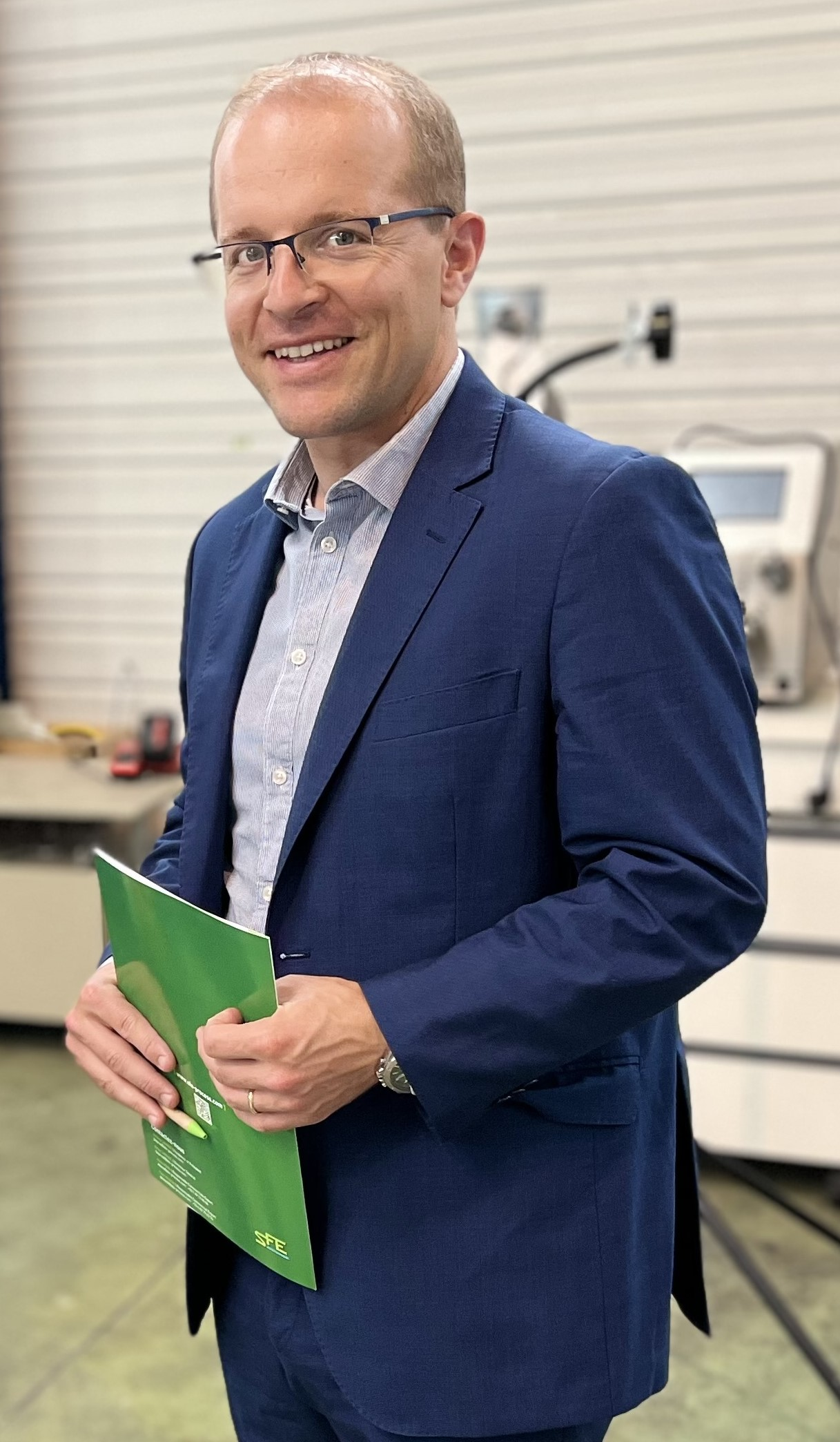

Member of the National Assembly for Meurthe-et-Moselle's 4th constituency
- Incumbent
- Assumed office 21 June 2017
- Preceded by: Jacques Lamblin

Personal details
- Born: 27 October 1984 (age 41) Nancy, Meurthe-et-Moselle, France
- Party: Republican

Thibault Bazin (born 27 October 1984) is a French Republican politician who has represented Meurthe-et-Moselle's 4th constituency in the National Assembly since 2017.

== Political career ==
Bazin was re-elected in the 2022 French legislative election. In parliament, he has been serving on the Committee on Social Affairs. In this capacity, he has been his parliamentary group's rapporteur on the 2023 French pension reform law (with Stéphane Viry) and on the 2025 Social Security Financing Bill (PLFSS).
