= Catherine Boursier =

French politician

Departmental councillor of Meurthe-et-Moselle
- Incumbent
- Assumed office 2 April 2015
- Constituency: Canton of Entre Seille et Meurthe

Member of the European Parliament
- In office 18 May 2008 – 13 July 2009
- Preceded by: Adeline Hazan
- Constituency: East France

Mayor of Champey-sur-Moselle
- In office June 1995 – March 2008
- Preceded by: Armand Vachon
- Succeeded by: Jean-Marie Milano

Personal details
- Born: 11 May 1953 (age 73) Le Plessis-Trévise, France
- Party: Socialist Party

Catherine Boursier-Mougenot (born 11 May 1953 in Le Plessis-Trévise) is a French politician, member of the Socialist Party since 1989.

== Political career ==
=== European Parliament ===
On the Socialist Party (PS) list for the 2004 European elections, she became a Member of the European Parliament (MEP) in May 2008 following the resignation of Adeline Hazan. She served on the Committee on Civil Liberties, Justice and Home Affairs. In 2009, running on the list led by Catherine Trautmann, she was not re-elected and concluded her term as an MEP on July 13, 2009.

=== Local Mandates ===
She was the mayor of Champey-sur-Moselle from June 1995 to March 2008, then served as deputy mayor in charge of finance from 2008 to 2014. During her municipal tenure, she held several positions: vice-president of the communauté de communes Froidmont (1995-2013); vice-president of Syndicat Mixte du Scot Sud 54 (2008-2014), and member of the Departmental Commission for Intercommunal Cooperation (CDCI).

In March 2010, she was elected regional councilor for Lorraine on Jean-Pierre Masseret's list. She served on the Planning Commission until December 2015 and did not run for the 2015 regional elections.

In March 2015, she was elected departmental councilor for the canton of Entre Seille et Meurthe, alongside Antony Caps (EELV), the mayor and outgoing general councilor of the canton of Nomeny. She held various roles, including territorial delegate to Territoire Val de Lorraine and vice-president of the Planning Commission. She represented the department in various organizations: EPFL, SEBL, and the Lorraine Regional Natural Park. On July 19, 2020, she was elected vice-president of the departmental council of Meurthe-et-Moselle.

She became president of the council of Pays du Val de Lorraine in December 2004, succeeding Jacques Chérèque, who had founded the council in 1989. She stepped down from this role on May 1, 2016, when the regional council was transformed into Pôle d'équilibre territorial et rural (PETR).

Re-elected in the canton of Entre Seille et Meurthe on June 27, 2021, still paired with Antony Caps, the mayor of Nomeny and vice-president of the Seille and Grand Couronné Community of Communes, she has been serving as the 1st Vice-President responsible for autonomy (elderly and disabled persons) since July 1, 2021.

== Honors ==
- Knight of the Legion of Honor
