= Meurthe-et-Moselle's 1st constituency =

Constituency of the National Assembly of France

1st constituency of Meurthe-et-Moselle
- inline Constituency of the National Assembly of France

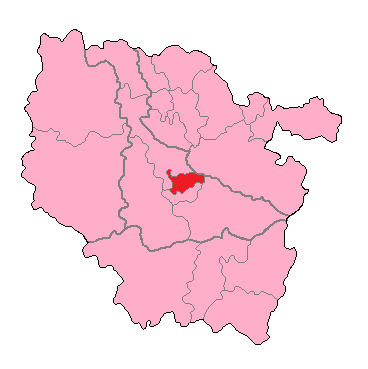
- Meurthe-et-Moselle's 1st Constituency shown within Lorraine
- Deputy: Estelle Mercier; PS
- Department: Meurthe-et-Moselle
- Cantons: Nancy-Est, Nancy-Nord, Nancy-Sud, Malzéville, Saint-Max, Seichamps
- Registered voters: 80,687

The 1st constituency of Meurthe-et-Moselle is a French legislative constituency in the Meurthe-et-Moselle département.

== Description ==
Meurthe-et-Moselle's 1st constituency contains most of the city of Nancy and its northern suburbs including Seichamps at is eastern extremity.

From 1988 to 2017 the seat swung between the Radical Party and the Socialist Party.

== Historic Representation ==
Election	Member	Party
1986	Proportional representation – no election by constituency	
1988	André Rossinot	PRV
1993	André Rossinot	PRV
1997	Jean-Jacques Denis	PS
2002	Laurent Hénart	PRV
2007	Laurent Hénart	PRV
2012	Chaynesse Khirouni	PS
2017	Carole Grandjean	LREM
2022	Carole Grandjean	RE
2022	Philippe Guillemard	RE
2024	Estelle Mercier	PS

== Election results ==
=== 2024 ===
Legislative Election 2024: Meurthe-et-Moselle's 1st constituency
Party	Candidate	Votes	%	±%
DLF	Massimo Nespolo	664	1.21	N/A
LR	Aurélien Arnould	3,518	6.43	−1.24
LO	Christiane Nimsgern	741	1.35	N/A
PS (NFP)	Estelle Mercier	20,645	37.73	N/A
RN	Patricia Melet	14,719	26.90	+12.39
RE (Ensemble)	Philippe Guillemard	3518	26.38	−7.31
Turnout		54722	97.93	+49.66
Registered electors		83,269		
2nd round result
PS	Estelle Mercier	32,531	63.96	+26.23
RN	Patricia Melet	18,334	36.04	+9.14
Turnout		50865	91.43	−6.50
Registered electors		8,369		
PS gain from RE				

=== 2022 ===
Legislative Election 2022: Meurthe-et-Moselle's 1st constituency
Party	Candidate	Votes	%	±%
LREM (Ensemble)	Carole Grandjean	13,159	33.69	-0.81
LFI (NUPÉS)	Nordine Jouira	12,822	32.83	+6.54
RN	Patricia Melet	5,669	14.51	+5.37
LR (UDC)	Claudine Brin	2,995	7.67	−0.11
REC	Laurent Hennequin	1,744	4.47	N/A
Others	N/A	2,149	-	−
Turnout		39,058	48.26	−2.12
2nd round result
LREM (Ensemble)	Carole Grandjean	19,520	53.43	-2.46
LFI (NUPÉS)	Nordine Jouira	17,017	46.57	+2.46
Turnout		36,537	47.33	+4.45
LREM hold				

=== 2017 ===
Candidate	Label	First round		Second round	
Candidate	Label	Votes	%	Votes	%
Carole Grandjean	REM	13,593	34.50	17,025	55.89
Chaynesse Khirouni	PS	5,704	14.48	13,439	44.11
Éric Pensalfini	DVD	5,610	14.24		
Nordine Jouira	FI	4,162	10.56		
Barbara Hoffmann	FN	3,602	9.14		
Mostafa Fourar	UDI	3,065	7.78		
Éric Damamme	ECO	856	2.17		
Marie-Christine Bastien	PCF	586	1.49		
François-Marie L'Huillier	DLF	571	1.45		
Dominique Michel	DIV	404	1.03		
Virginie Wawrzyniak	ECO	397	1.01		
Pierre-Nicolas Nups	EXD	304	0.77		
Christiane Nimsgern	EXG	217	0.55		
Maxime Logerot	DIV	205	0.52		
Éric Tollenaere	DVG	128	0.32		
Votes		39,404	100.00	30,464	100.00
Valid votes		39,404	98.65	30,464	89.60
Blank votes		378	0.95	2,507	7.37
Null votes		163	0.41	1,029	3.03
Turnout		39,945	50.38	34,000	42.88
Abstentions		39,345	49.62	45,290	57.12
Registered voters		79,290		79,290	
Source: Ministry of the Interior

=== 2012 ===
Legislative Election 2012: Meurthe-et-Moselle's 1st constituency
Party	Candidate	Votes	%	±%
PS	Chaynesse Khirouni	16,953	37.93	
PRV	Laurent Hénart	15,381	34.42	
FN	Natacha Waszezynski	5,429	12.15	
FG	Mathieu Piotrowski	2,476	5.54	
EELV	Christophe Pierre	1,172	2.62	
Others	N/A	3,281		
Turnout		44,692	55.39	
2nd round result
PS	Chaynesse Khirouni	23,229	52.23	
PRV	Laurent Hénart	21,245	47.77	
Turnout		44,474	55.12	
PS gain from PRV				

== Sources ==
Official results of French elections from 2002: "Résultats électoraux officiels en France" (in French).
