= Adeline Hazan =

French politician of the Socialist Party (born 1956)

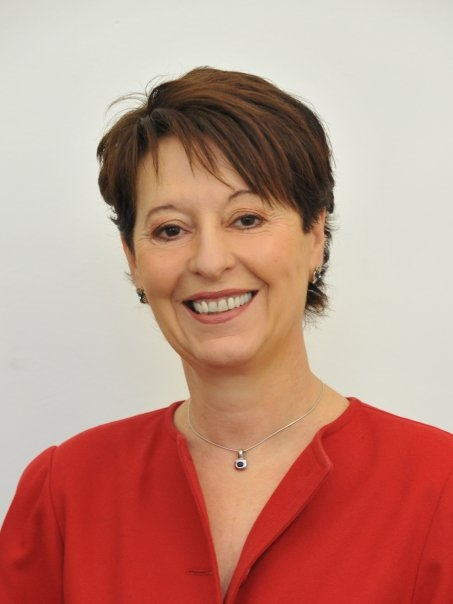
- Adeline Hazan in 2011

President of UNICEF France
- Incumbent
- Assumed office 18 June 2022
- Preceded by: Jean-Marie Dru

Mayor of Reims
- In office 21 March 2008 – 4 April 2014
- Preceded by: Jean-Louis Schneiter
- Succeeded by: Arnaud Robinet

Member of the European Parliament
- In office 1999–2008
- Succeeded by: Catherine Boursier

Personal details
- Born: 21 January 1956 (age 70) Paris, France
- Party: Socialist Party
- Education: French National School for the Judiciary
- Profession: Magistrate

Adeline Hazan (born 21 January 1956 in Paris) is a French politician of the Socialist Party (PS) who served as a Member of the European Parliament for the east of France from 1999 to 2008, and mayor of Reims from March 2008 to April 2014.

Since 2022, Hazan has served as the president of the French National Committee of UNICEF.

== Early life and education ==
- Master's degree in private law
- Diploma, Paris Institute of Criminology (1976)
- National College for Judicial Officials (nomination in 1980)

== Political career ==
=== Early beginnings ===
Hazan joined the Socialist Party in 1992 and Lionel Jospin's campaign team ahead of the 1995 presidential election.

=== Member of the European Parliament, 1999–2008 ===
As part of the Party of European Socialists, Hazan served on the European Parliament's Committee on Civil Liberties, Justice and Home Affairs. In this capacity, she was the parliament's rapporteur on the introduction of the European Arrest Warrant.

Hazan was also a substitute for the Committee on Legal Affairs, a member of the delegation for relations with the Mashreq countries, a member of the delegation to the Euro-Mediterranean Parliamentary Assembly, and a substitute for the delegation for relations with the Maghreb countries and the Arab Maghreb Union.

=== Mayor of Reims, 2008–2014 ===
Hazan was elected mayor of Reims in the 2008 local elections thanks to the lack of unity of right parties. She competed against former minister Catherine Vautrin.

Ahead of the Socialist Party's 2008 convention in Reims, Hazan publicly endorsed Martine Aubry as candidate to succeed François Hollande at the party's leadership. Since the convention, she has had the nickname of "La Bonne" (the Maid) after Aubry's phrase at the 2008 Reims Congress of the Socialist Party: "T'aurais pu faire le ménage Adeline" ("Adeline, you should have cleaned the house", after seeing a spider on her desk during her candidacy speech.)

Hazan was not re-elected in the 2014 elections, when she obtained only 42.75% of votes of citizens; consequently, her Republican competitor, Arnaud Robinet became mayor of Reims in April 2014.

== Life after politics ==
Following an appointment by President François Hollande, Hazan served as independent ombudsman on the situation in France's prisons from 2014 to 2020.

== Recognition ==
Hazan was a finalist for the 2010 World Mayor prize.

== Other activities ==
- Judge for the implementation of sentences, Châlons-sur-Marne (1980)
- Children's judge, Nanterre High Court (1983) and Paris High Court (1995)
- Adviser to the Minister for Employment and Solidarity (1997–1999)
- President of the Judiciary Association (1986–1989)
- Socialist Party national secretary responsible for social issues (since 1995)
- Member of the Reims Municipal Council (since 2001)
- Member of the Champagne-Ardenne Regional Council (1998–2001)
