= Pompey, Meurthe-et-Moselle =

Pompey
- Commune
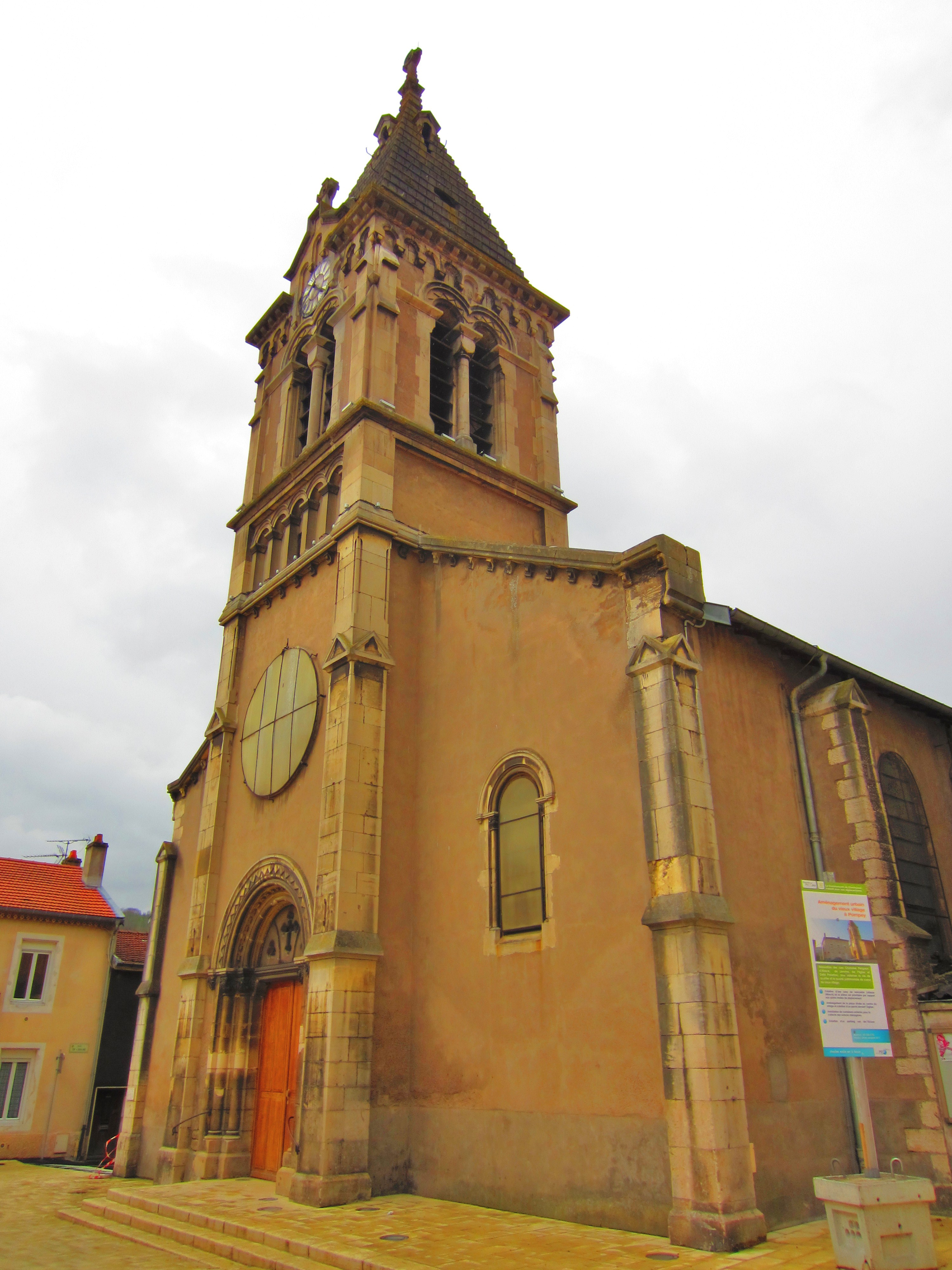
- The church in Pompey

- Coat of arms
- Location of Pompey
- Location within France Location within Grand Est
- Coordinates: 48°46′08″N 6°07′42″E
- Country: France
- Region: Grand Est
- Department: Meurthe-et-Moselle
- Arrondissement: Nancy
- Canton: Val de Lorraine Sud
- Intercommunality: CC du Bassin de Pompey

Government
  - Mayor (2020–2026): Laurent Trogrlic
- Area^{1}: 8.13 km^{2} (3.14 sq mi)
- Elevation: 196 m (643 ft)
- Highest elevation: 358 m (1,175 ft)
- Lowest elevation: 185 m (607 ft)
- Population (2023): 4,780
  - Density: 588/km^{2} (1,520/sq mi)
- Time zone: UTC+01:00 (CET)
  - Summer (DST): UTC+02:00 (CEST)
- INSEE/Postal code: 54430 /54340
- ^{1} French Land Register data, which excludes lakes, ponds, glaciers > 1 km^{2} (0.386 sq mi or 247 acres) and river estuaries.

Pompey (French pronunciation: [pɔ̃pɛ]) is a commune in the Meurthe-et-Moselle department in north-eastern France.

It is an industrial town (mainly steel industry), at the confluence of the rivers Moselle and Meurthe.

== Population ==
Historical population
Year	Pop.	±% p.a.
1968	6,281	—
1975	6,473	+0.43%
1982	5,685	−1.84%
1990	5,144	−1.24%
1999	5,229	+0.18%
2007	5,119	−0.27%
2012	4,888	−0.92%
2017	4,884	−0.02%
2023	4,780	−0.36%
Source: INSEE

== Notable people ==
- Nicolas-Antoine Nouet, born 1740 in Pompey, died 1811 in Chambéry, astronomer
- Marcel Le Bihan (1923-2009), resistant and former mayor of the commune
- Hubert Haenel (1942-2015), politician and a member of the Senate of France

== Astronomy ==
The minor planet 18636 Villedepompey is named after the town.

== See also ==
- Communes of the Meurthe-et-Moselle department
