= Anthony Boulogne =

French politician (born 1993)

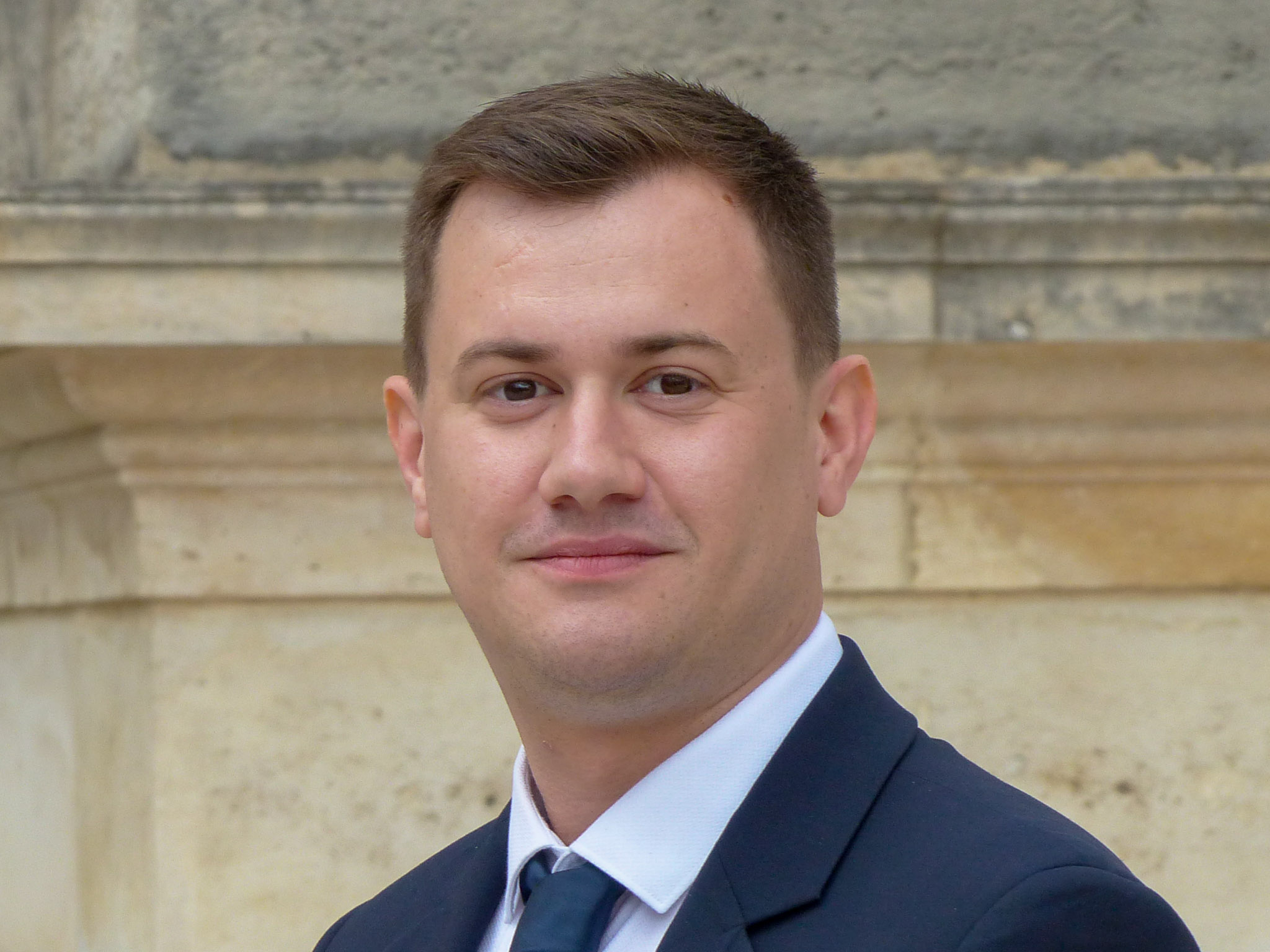

Member of the French National Assembly for Meurthe-et-Moselle's 6th constituency
- Incumbent
- Assumed office 18 July 2024
- Preceded by: Caroline Fiat

Personal details
- Born: 8 June 1993 (age 32) Laxou, France
- Political party: National Rally (since 2013)

Anthony Boulogne (born 8 June 1993) is a French politician of the National Rally. He was elected member of the National Assembly for Meurthe-et-Moselle's 6th constituency in 2024.

== Early life and career ==
Boulogne was born in Laxou and joined the National Rally in 2013, at the age of 19. In the 2021 departmental elections in Meurthe-et-Moselle, he contested the canton of Toul. He was a candidate for Meurthe-et-Moselle's 6th constituency in 2022, and ran in the 2023 French Senate election in Meurthe-et-Moselle.
