= Jacques Lamblin =

French politician

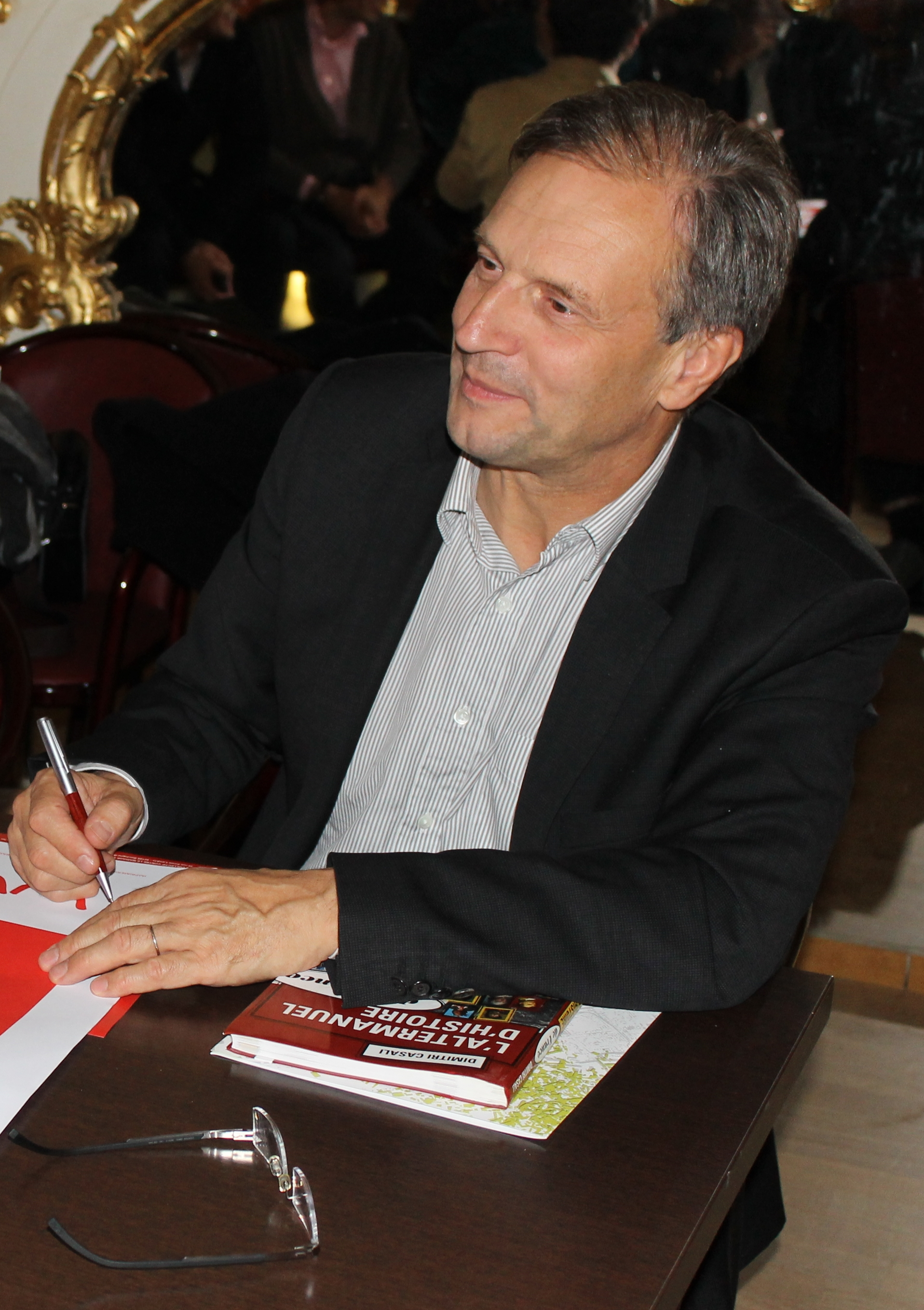
Lamblin in 2012

Jacques Lamblin (born August 29, 1952, in Nancy) is a member of the National Assembly of France. He represents the Meurthe-et-Moselle department, and is a member of the Union for a Popular Movement.
