= Jean-Yves Le Déaut =

French politician

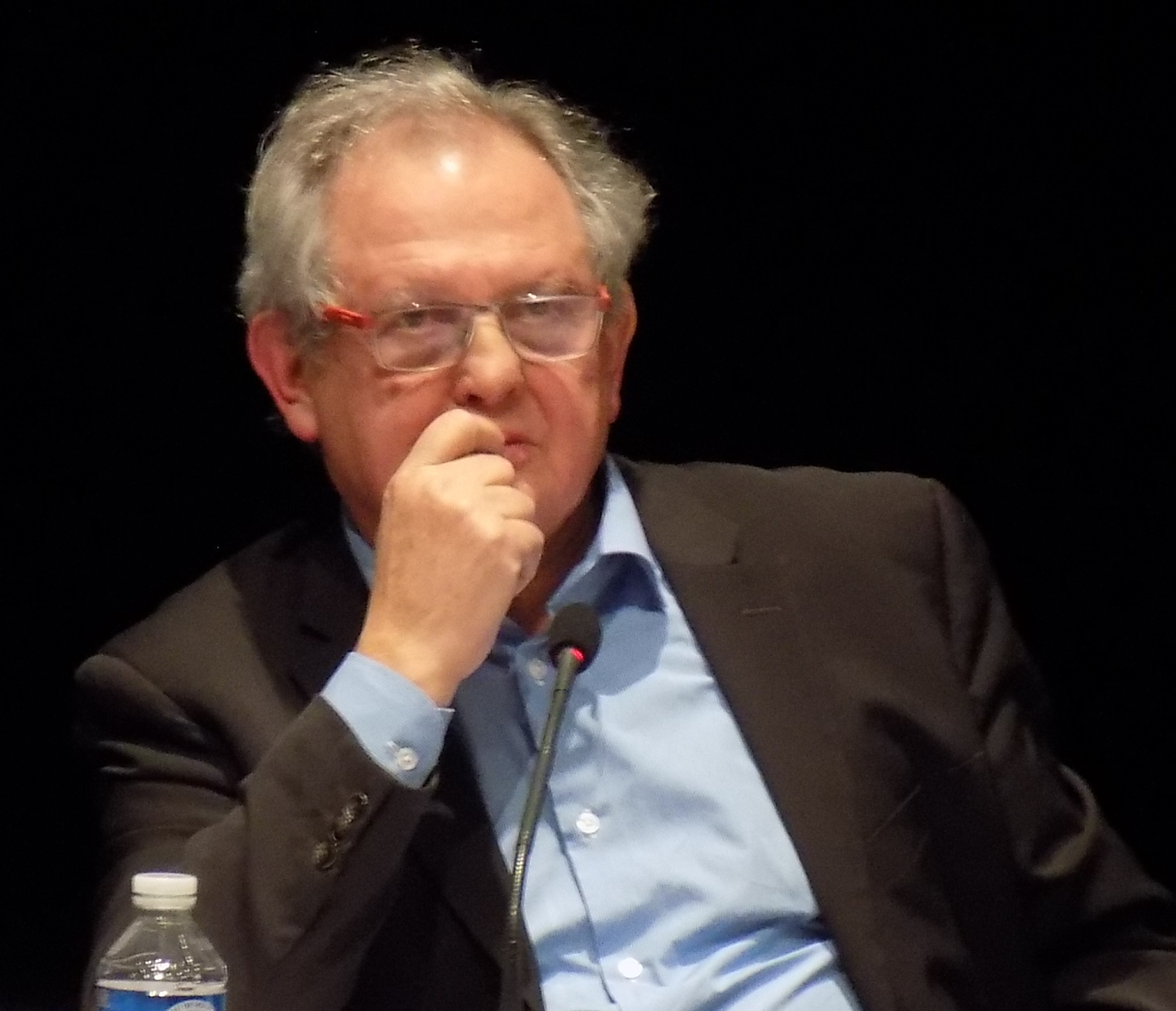
Déaut in 2015

Jean-Yves Le Déaut (born 1 February 1945 in Guémené-sur-Scorff) is a member of the National Assembly of France. He represents the Meurthe-et-Moselle department, and is a member of the Socialiste, radical, citoyen et divers gauche.
