= Estelle Mercier =

French politician (born 1973)

Member of the National Assembly for Meurthe-et-Moselle's 1st constituency
- Incumbent
- Assumed office 8 July 2024
- Preceded by: Philippe Guillemard

Personal details
- Born: 15 January 1973 (age 53) Paris, France
- Party: Socialist Party

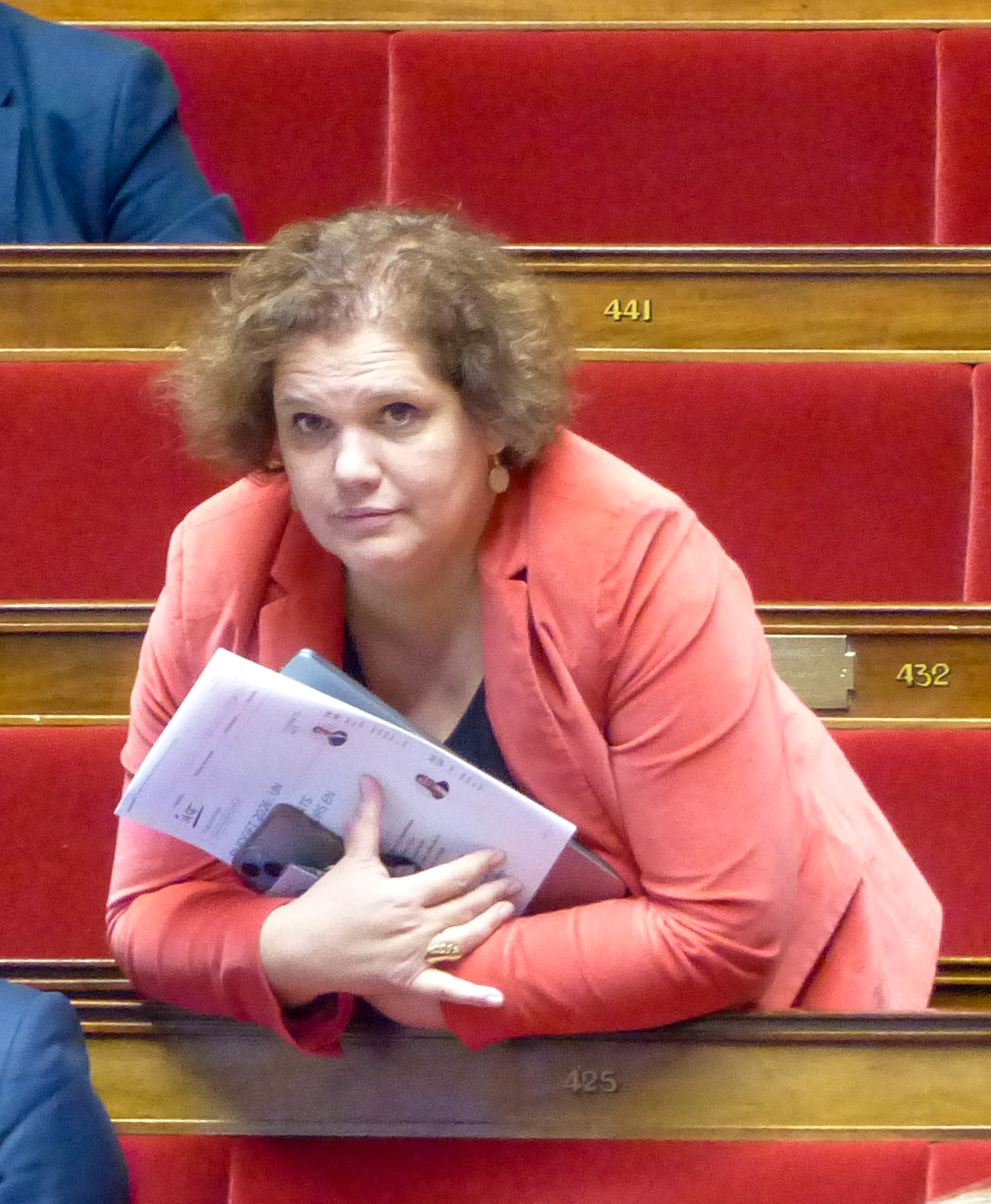

Estelle Mercier (born 15 January 1973) is a French politician. A member of the Socialist Party, she has been a member of parliament for Meurthe-et-Moselle's 1st constituency in the National Assembly since 2024.

== Biography ==
A doctor of management science, she was a lecturer at IAE Nancy.

She was first elected in Essey-lès-Nancy, where she was deputy mayor responsible for the budget, HR and general resources from 2001 to 2014. She ran in Nancy in 2020, becoming deputy mayor responsible for mobility, financial and human resources, social dialogue and public procurement.

In the second round of the 2024 French legislative election, she was elected deputy with 63.96% of the vote in Meurthe-et-Moselle's 1st constituency against Patricia Melet the National Rally (RN) candidate (36.04% of the vote).

In the National Assembly, she sits on the Finance Committee, where she is special budget rapporteur on the “Work and Employment” mission in 2025.

On 25 June 2025, she was elected first federal secretary of the Meurthe-et-Moselle federation of the Socialist Party. She thus succeeded Marie-José Amah at the party's 81st Congrès de Nancy.

== Mandates ==
- 2001-2014: Deputy Mayor of Essey-lès-Nancy, responsible for the budget, HR and general resources
- Since 28 June 2020: municipal councilor of Nancy, metropolitan councilor of the Greater Nancy metropolis
- 5 July 2020 - 7 July 2024: Deputy Mayor of Nancy responsible for mobility, financial and human resources, social dialogue and public procurement
- Since 8 July 2024: MP for Meurthe-et-Moselle's 1st constituency

== See also ==
- List of deputies of the 17th National Assembly of France
