= Canton of Val de Lorraine Sud =

Canton in Grand Est, France

Coordinates: 48.71°N 6.16°E

The canton of Val de Lorraine Sud is an administrative division of the Meurthe-et-Moselle department, northeastern France. It was created at the French canton reorganisation which came into effect in March 2015. Its seat is in Maxéville.

It consists of the following communes:

1. Champigneulles
2. Frouard
3. Marbache
4. Maxéville
5. Pompey
