= Cantons of Nancy =

Coordinates: 48.69°N 6.18°E

The cantons of Nancy are administrative divisions of the Meurthe-et-Moselle department, in northeastern France. Since the French canton reorganisation which came into effect in March 2015, the city of Nancy is subdivided into 3 cantons. Their seat is in Nancy.

== Population ==
Name	Population (2019)	Cantonal Code
Canton of Nancy-1	35,946	5412
Canton of Nancy-2	32,959	5413
Canton of Nancy-3	36,153	5414
