= Philippe Guillemard =

French politician (born 1975)

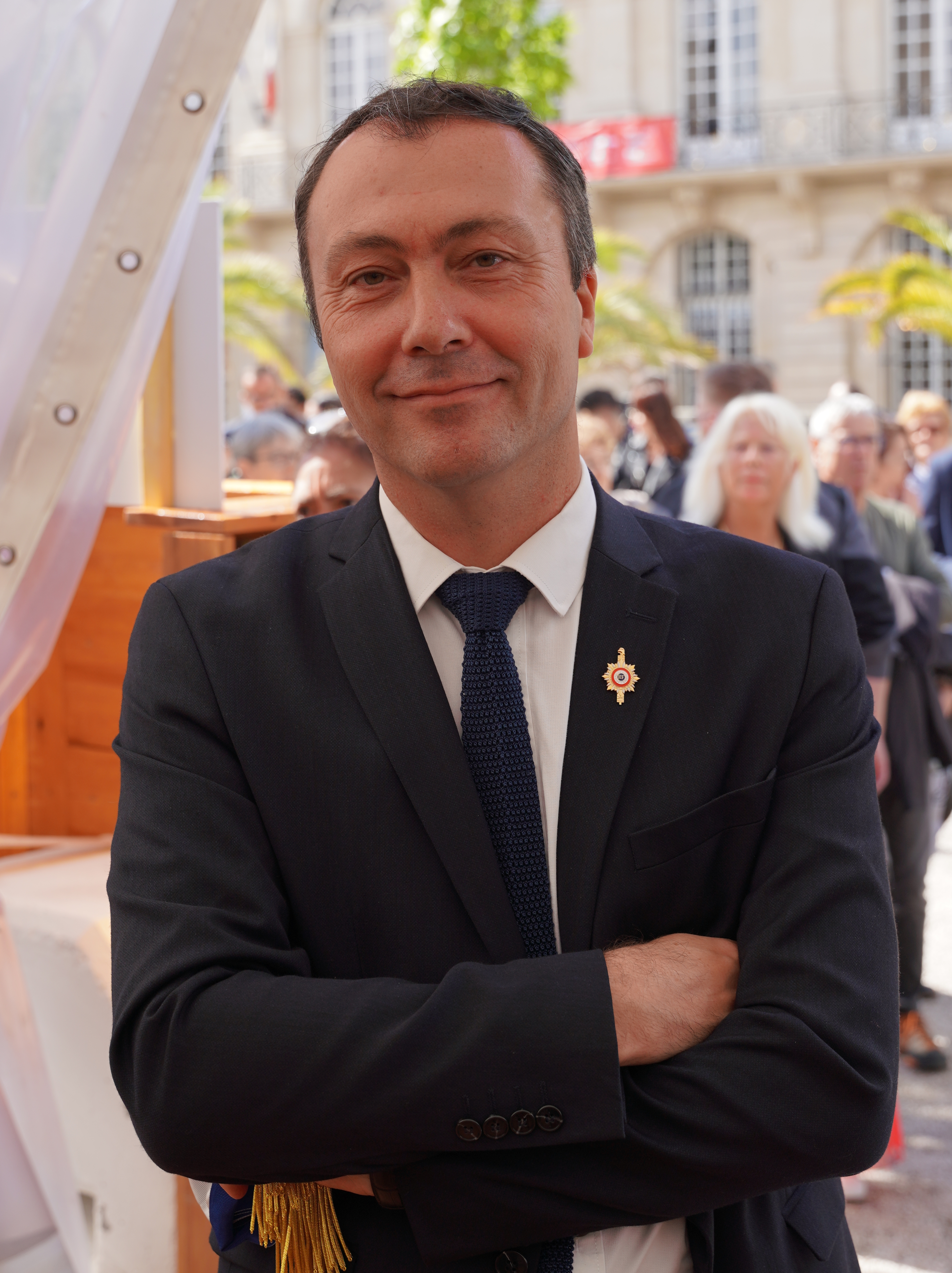

Member of the National Assembly for Meurthe-et-Moselle's 1st constituency
- In office 5 August 2022 – 11 February 2024
- Preceded by: Carole Grandjean
- Succeeded by: Carole Grandjean

Personal details
- Born: 28 April 1975 (age 50) Metz, France
- Party: Renaissance
- Profession: Lawyer

Philippe Guillemard (born 28 April 1975, Metz) is a French politician of Renaissance (RE) who served as a member of the National Assembly for Meurthe-et-Moselle's 1st constituency from 2022 to 2024.

== Biography ==
A member of the Nancy bar since 2002, specializing in criminal law, he was President of the Nancy Bar in 2014 and 2015. He is in a civil partnership and has one child.

In 2016, he met Carole Grandjean while campaigning alongside her for candidate Emmanuel Macron and agreed to be her deputy in the 2017 legislative elections.

He is an opposition municipal councillor in Nancy.

Following Carole Grandjean's appointment to the Élisabeth Borne government, he became deputy for the 1st constituency of Meurthe-et-Moselle.

He joined the Renaissance group.

He was a member of the National Consultative Commission on Human Rights, appointed by the President of the National Assembly.
