= Chaynesse Khirouni =

French politician

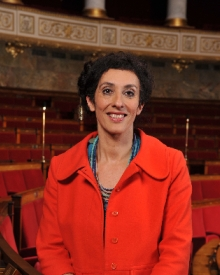

Member of the French National Assembly for Meurthe-et-Moselle's 1st constituency
- In office 17 June 2012 – 21 June 2017
- Preceded by: Laurent Hénart

Personal details
- Born: 17 March 1968 (age 58) Douai, France
- Party: Socialist Party

Chaynesse Khirouni (born 17 March 1968 in Douai) is a French politician elected in 2012 as a deputy for the Socialist Party.

She is the daughter of a steel industry Algerian toiler.

She finished first in the first round in Meurthe-et-Moselle's 1st constituency, with 37.9% and won the second round with 52.23%.

She also sits on the municipal council of Nancy.
