= Canton of Vandœuvre-lès-Nancy =

Canton in Grand Est, France

Coordinates: 48.66°N 6.17°E

The canton of Vandœuvre-lès-Nancy is an administrative division of the Meurthe-et-Moselle department, northeastern France. It was created at the French canton reorganisation which came into effect in March 2015. Its seat is in Vandœuvre-lès-Nancy.

It consists of the following communes:

1. Vandœuvre-lès-Nancy
