= Meurthe-et-Moselle =

Department of France

- Department
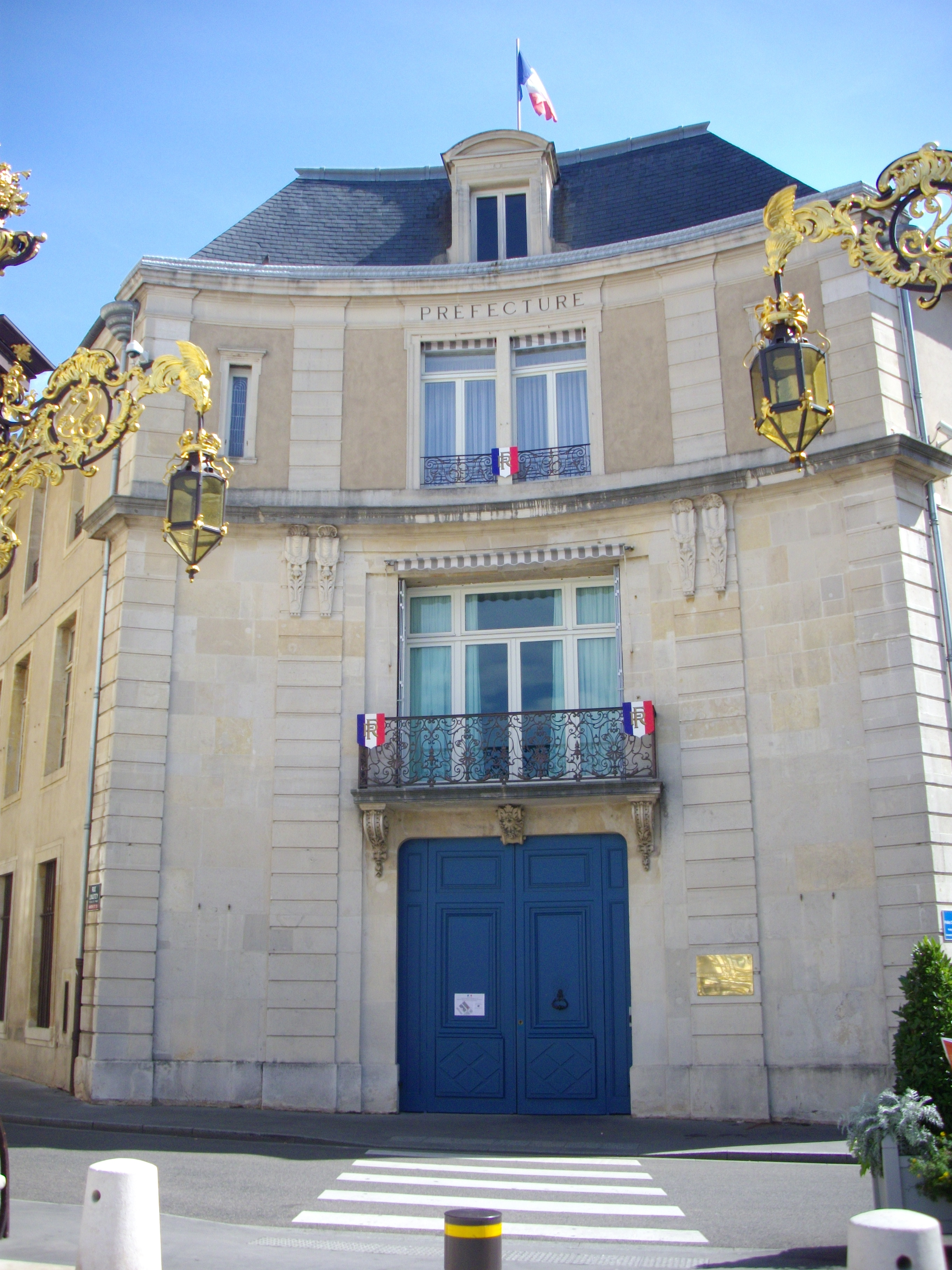
- Prefecture building of the Meurthe-et-Moselle department, in Nancy

- Coat of arms

- Location of Meurthe-et-Moselle in France
- Coordinates: 48°40′N 06°10′E
- Country: France
- Region: Grand Est
- Prefecture: Nancy
- Subprefectures: Val de Briey; Lunéville; Toul

Government
  - President of the Departmental Council: Chaynesse Khirouni (PS)

Area^{1}
  - Total: 5,246 km^{2} (2,025 sq mi)

Population (2023)
  - Total: 732,236
  - Rank: 33rd
  - Density: 139.6/km^{2} (361.5/sq mi)
- Time zone: UTC+1 (CET)
  - Summer (DST): UTC+2 (CEST)
- ISO 3166 code: FR-54
- Department number: 54
- Arrondissements: 4
- Cantons: 23
- Communes: 591
- ^1 French Land Register data, which exclude estuaries and lakes, ponds and glaciers larger than 1 km^{2}

Meurthe-et-Moselle (French pronunciation: [mœʁt e mɔzɛl], lit. 'Meurthe and Moselle') is a department in the Grand Est region of France, named after the rivers Meurthe and Moselle. Its prefecture and largest city is Nancy and it borders the departments of Meuse to the west, Vosges to the south, and Moselle and Bas-Rhin to the east, and it also borders the Belgian province of Luxembourg and the country of Luxembourg by the canton of Esch-sur-Alzette to the north. It had a population of 732,236 in 2023.

== History ==
Meurthe-et-Moselle was created in 1871 at the end of the Franco-Prussian War from the parts of the former departments of Moselle and Meurthe which remained French territory.

The current boundary between Meurthe-et-Moselle and Moselle was the border between France and Germany from 1871 to 1919 and again between 1940 and 1944. The only subsequent change took place in 1997 and involved the incorporation, for administrative reasons, of the little commune of Han-devant-Pierrepont which had previously fallen within the Meuse department.

== Geography ==
Meurthe-et-Moselle is part of the administrative region of Grand Est and the traditional region of Lorraine and is surrounded by the departments of Meuse, Vosges, Bas-Rhin, and Moselle, and by the nations of Luxembourg and Belgium by the salient of the arrondissement of Val-de-Briey. It is one of two departments in France which border with Luxembourg. Parts of Meurthe-et-Moselle belong to the Lorraine Regional Natural Park.

The department extends for 130 km from north to south and is between 7 and 103 km wide.

Its chief rivers are the Moselle, the Meurthe, the Chiers, and the Vezouze.

== Economy ==
The economy was highly dependent on mining until the 1960s. There are iron, salt, and lime extraction sites. The urban area around Nancy has an economy based largely on services, research, and higher education.

== Transport ==
The department is served by Metz–Nancy–Lorraine Airport which provides scheduled air service to several cities in France and some North African countries. However, other airports such as Luxembourg Airport and Strasbourg Airport are also used by air travellers from the department.

== Demographics ==
The inhabitants of the department are known as Meurthe-et-Mosellans. The area around Nancy has become highly urbanized, whereas the Saintois in the south is quite rural.

Population development since 1801:

Historical population

Year	Pop.	±% p.a.
1801	338,115	—
1831	415,568	+0.69%
1841	444,603	+0.68%
1851	450,423	+0.13%
1861	428,643	−0.49%
1872	365,137	−1.45%
1881	419,317	+1.55%
1891	444,150	+0.58%
1901	484,722	+0.88%
1911	564,730	+1.54%
1921	503,810	−1.13%
1931	592,632	+1.64%
1936	576,041	−0.57%

Year	Pop.	±% p.a.
1946	528,805	−0.85%
1954	607,022	+1.74%
1962	678,078	+1.39%
1968	705,554	+0.66%
1975	722,693	+0.34%
1982	716,964	−0.11%
1990	711,943	−0.09%
1999	713,779	+0.03%
2007	726,592	+0.22%
2012	733,266	+0.18%
2017	733,481	+0.01%
2023	732,236	−0.03%

Figures before 1872 refer to the Meurthe department. Sources:

=== Principal towns ===
The most populous commune is Nancy, the prefecture. As of 2023, there are 10 communes with more than 10,000 inhabitants:

Commune	Population (2023)
Nancy	103,671
Vandœuvre-lès-Nancy	29,942
Lunéville	18,262
Toul	15,768
Longwy	15,679
Laxou	14,771
Villers-lès-Nancy	14,718
Pont-à-Mousson	14,190
Villerupt	10,102
Maxéville	10,090

== Politics ==
The president of the Departmental Council is Chaynesse Khirouni, elected in July 2021.

=== Presidential elections 2nd round ===
Election	Winning candidate	Party	%	2nd place candidate	Party	%
2022	Emmanuel Macron	LREM	54.42	Marine Le Pen	FN	45.58
2017	Emmanuel Macron	LREM	60.66	Marine Le Pen	FN	39.34
2012	François Hollande	PS	53.06	Nicolas Sarkozy	UMP	46.94
2007	Nicolas Sarkozy	UMP	51.12	Ségolène Royal	PS	48.88
2002	Jacques Chirac	RPR	81.72	Jean-Marie Le Pen	FN	18.28
1995	Lionel Jospin	PS	51.99	Jacques Chirac	RPR	48.01

=== Current National Assembly Representatives ===
Constituency	Member	Party
Meurthe-et-Moselle's 1st constituency	Estelle Mercier	Socialist Party
Meurthe-et-Moselle's 2nd constituency	Stéphane Hablot	Socialist Party
Meurthe-et-Moselle's 3rd constituency	Martine Étienne	La France Insoumise
Meurthe-et-Moselle's 4th constituency	Thibault Bazin	The Republicans
Meurthe-et-Moselle's 5th constituency	Dominique Potier	Miscellaneous left
Meurthe-et-Moselle's 6th constituency	Anthony Boulogne	National Rally

== Tourism ==
Detail of the Place Stanislas in Nancy, a UNESCO World Heritage Site

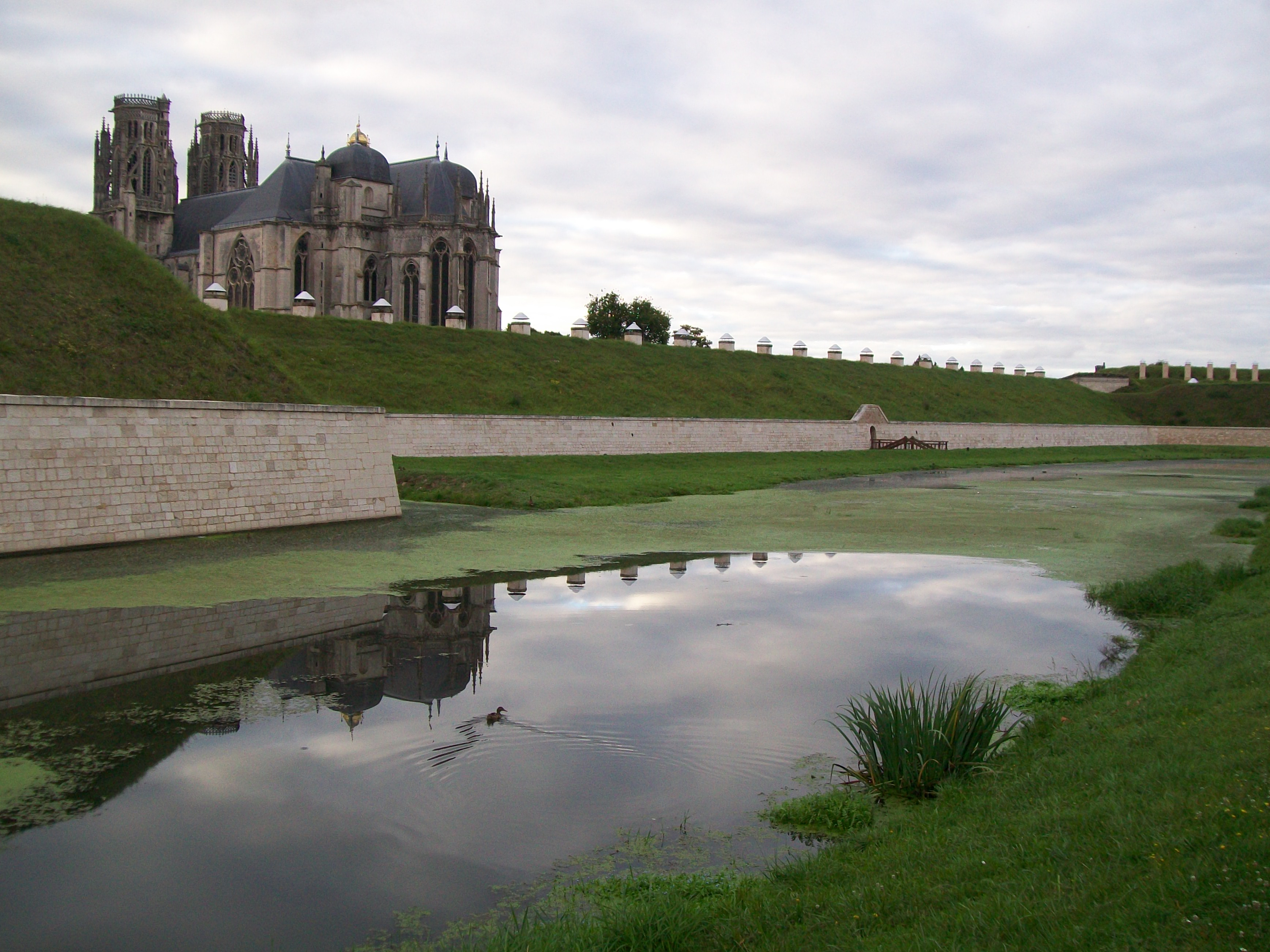
Walls and cathedral of Toul

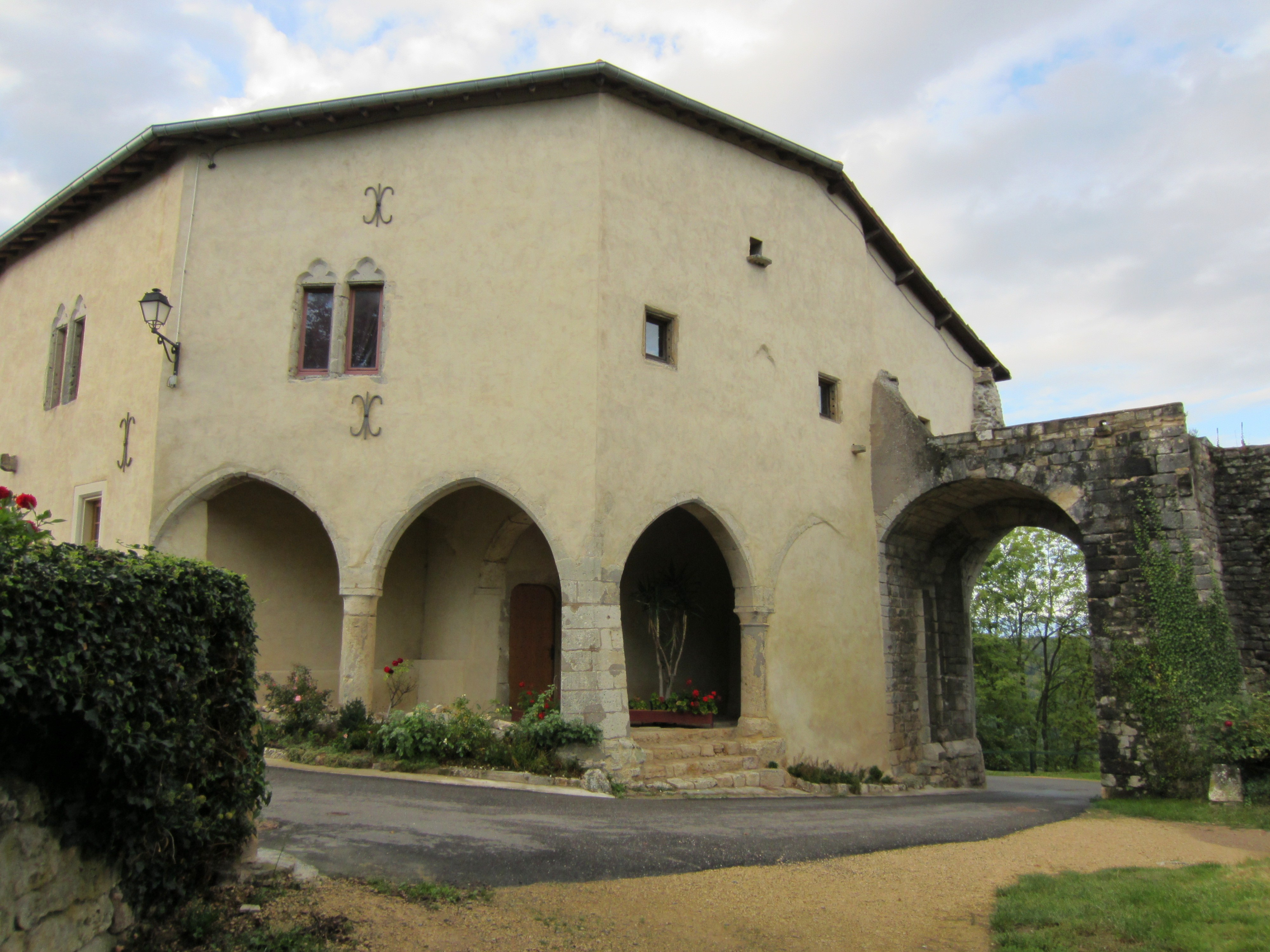
House near the château of Prény

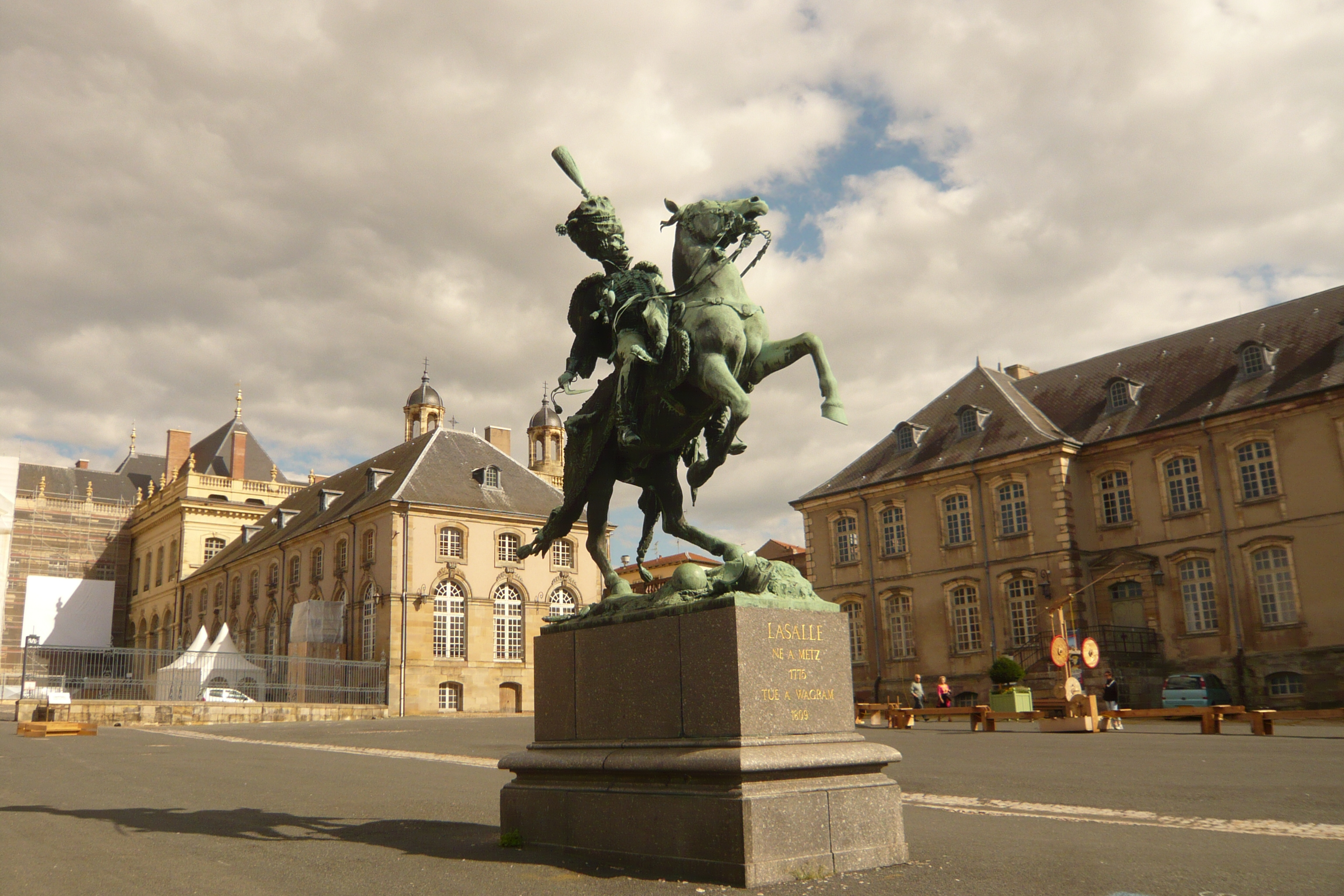
General Lasalle monument in Lunéville

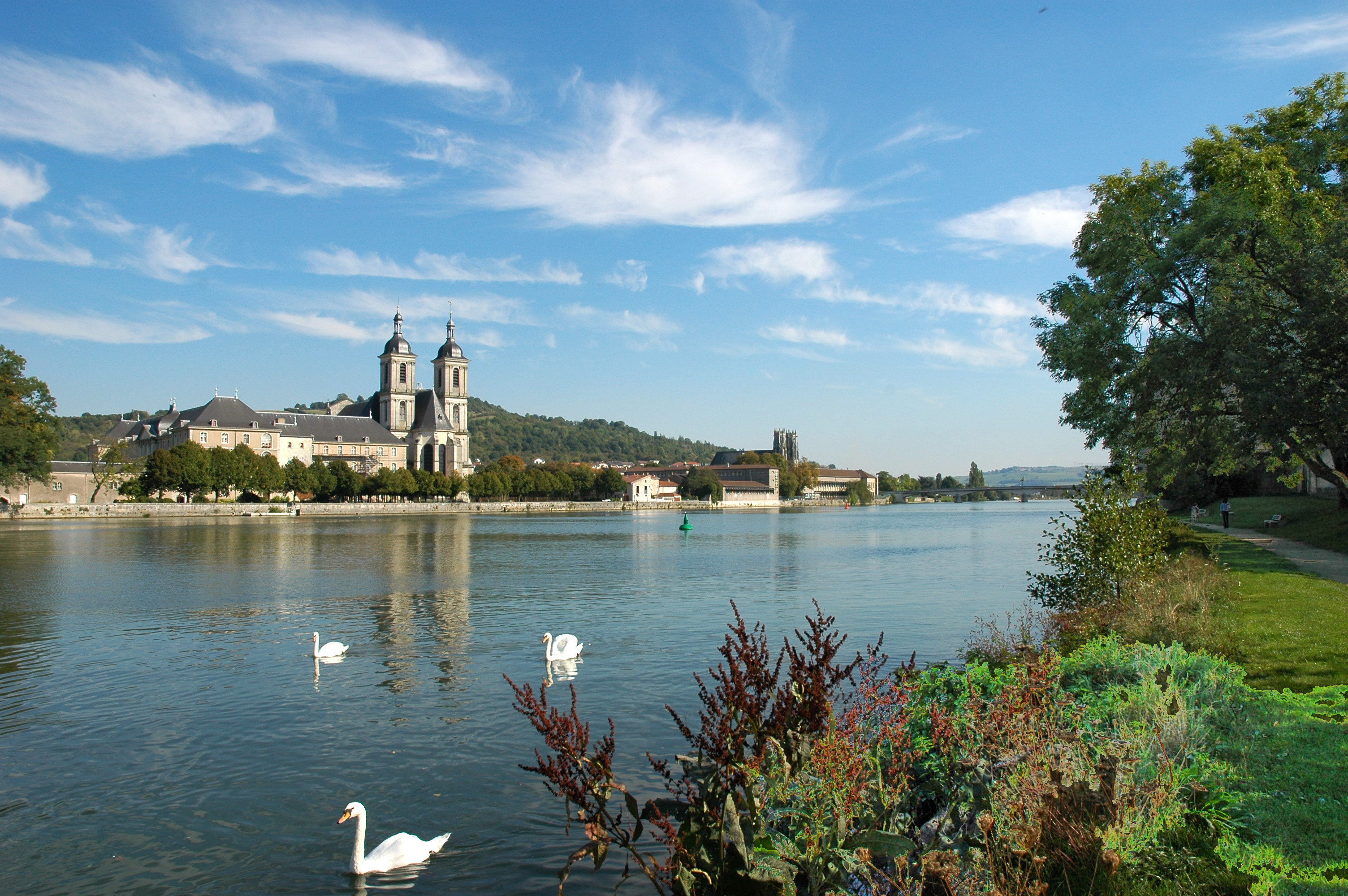
The river Moselle near Pont-à-Mousson

== See also ==
- Arrondissements of the Meurthe-et-Moselle department
- Cantons of the Meurthe-et-Moselle department
- Communes of the Meurthe-et-Moselle department
