= Ecological and Social =

Parliamentary group in France

Ecological and Social Ecologiste et Social
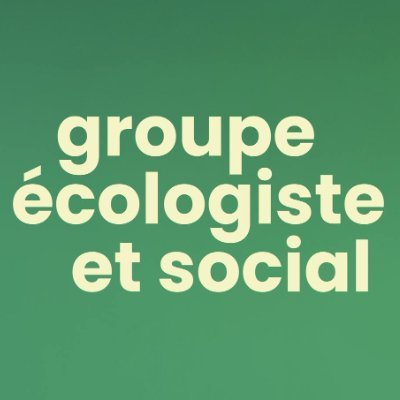
- Chamber: National Assembly
- Legislature(s): 14th (Fifth Republic); 16th (Fifth Republic); 17th (Fifth Republic)
- Foundation: June 2012
- Member parties: The Ecologists; Génération.s; L'Après; Ecology Generation; Debout!
- President: Cyrielle Chatelain
- Constituency: Isère's 2nd
- Vice presidents: Sophie Taillé-Polian
- Representation: 38 / 577
- Ideology: Green politics Alter-globalization; European federalism
- Website: https://ecolodepute-e-s.fr/

Ecological and Social (French: Ecologiste et Social) is a parliamentary group in the National Assembly of France.

The first iteration of the group was existed between June 2012 and May 2016 during the 14th legislature of the French Fifth Republic. After disbanding following the 2017 French legislative election, the group was recreated in June 2022, at the start of the 16th legislature of the French Fifth Republic, following the 2022 French legislative election. Members parties of this group coordinate with the New Popular Front.

== List of presidents ==
Name	Term start	Term end	Constituency
Julien Bayou	22 June 2022	September 2022	Paris's 5th
Cyrielle Chatelain	22 June 2022	present	Isère's 2nd

Bayou and Chatelain were joint presidents from June to September 2022.

== Historical membership ==
Year	Seats	Change	Notes
2022	23 / 577	▲23	
2024	38 / 577	▲15	
