= Petr Pavlensky =

Russian performance artist

Pyotr Andreevich Pavlensky Пётр Андреевич Павленский
- Born: 8 March 1984 (age 42); Leningrad, Russian SFSR, Soviet Union
- Education: Saint Petersburg Art and Industry Academy, St. Petersburg Pro Arte Foundation for Culture and Arts
- Known for: Actionism, Political art
- Notable work: Seam, Carcass, Fixation, Freedom, Segregation, Lighting, Pornopolitics

Pyotr (or Petr) Andreyevich Pavlensky (Russian: Пётр Андреевич Павленский; born 8 March 1984) is a Russian contemporary artist. He is known for his controversial political art performances, which he calls "events of Subject-Object Art" (previously "events of political art"). His work often involves nudity and self-mutilation. In a manner likened to ancient Cynic protest, Pavlensky makes the "mechanics of power" visible, forcing authorities to take part in his events by staging them in areas with heavy police surveillance. By doing so, "the criminal case becomes one of the layers of the artwork" and the government is "[drawn] into the process of making art".

In 2017, he was granted political asylum in France, but in May 2026, OFPRA (the French Office for the Protection of Refugees and Stateless Persons) initiated proceedings to revoke Pavlensky's political asylum due to his implementation of the events Lighting and Pornopolitics within the territory of France.

== Early life and education ==
Born in Leningrad in 1984, Pavlensky studied monumental art at the Saint Petersburg Art and Industry Academy. During his fourth year in the Academy, he took additional training at St. Petersburg Pro Arte Foundation for Culture and Arts (ru:Про Арте).

Pavlensky's "events" are inspired in part by Pussy Riot, as demonstrated in Seam, and follow in the tradition of artists such as Chris Burden, the Viennese Actionists, and Moscow Actionists Oleg Kulik and Alexander Brener, Fluxus and Joseph Beuys.

== Career ==
Pavlensky and Oksana Shalygina founded an independent online newspaper Political Propaganda in 2012, which was dedicated to contemporary art in political contexts, "overcoming cultural chauvinism, implemented by the government", feminism and gender equality.

=== Seam (2012) ===
Pavlensky first became known for sewing his mouth shut at a political art event staged against the incarceration of members of the Russian punk group Pussy Riot. On 23 July 2012 Pavlensky appeared at Kazan Cathedral, St. Petersburg with his lips sewn shut, holding a banner that stated: "Action of Pussy Riot was a replica of the famous action of Jesus Christ (Matthew 21:12–13)". Police called an ambulance and sent him for a psychiatric examination; the psychiatrist declared him sane and released him shortly after the incident. The artist stated that he was highlighting the lack of regard for artists in contemporary Russia, saying: "My intention was not to surprise anyone or come up with something unusual. Rather, I felt I had to make a gesture that would accurately reflect my situation".

Seam is said to reference David Wojnarowicz's actions in Rosa von Praunheim's documentary Silence = Death (1990), in which Wojnarowicz had sewn his own lips shut in protest at the Reagan administration's lack of action against the AIDS epidemic.

On 14 November 2012 Reuters published its list of the 98 best photos of the year, which included Seam.

=== Carcass (2013) ===
On 3 May 2013 Pavlensky staged a political art event aimed at showing the existence of a person caught inside a repressive legal system. This event was called Carcass. His assistants brought him naked, wrapped in a multilayered cocoon of barbed wire, to the main entrance of the Legislative Assembly of Saint Petersburg. The artist remained silent, lying still in a half-bent position inside the cocoon, and did not react to the actions of others until he was released by the police with the help of garden clippers. This performance was awarded the Alternative Prize for Russian Activist Art in the "Actions Implemented in Urban Space" category in 2013.

Pavlensky made the following comment about his artwork: "A series of laws aimed at suppressing civic activism, intimidation of the population, steadily growing number of political prisoners, the laws against NGOs, the 18+ laws, censorship laws, activity of Federal Service for Supervision of Communications, Information Technology and Mass Media, "promotion of homosexuality" laws – all these laws aren't aimed against criminals, but against the people. And at last the Blasphemy law. That is why I organized this action. The human body is naked like a carcass, there is nothing on it except the barbed wire, which by the way was invented for the protection of livestock. These laws like the wire, keep people in individual pens: all this persecution of political activists, "prisoners of May, 6", governmental repressions is the metaphor of the pen with the barbed wire around it. All this has been done in order to turn people into gutless and securely guarded cattle, which can only consume, work, and reproduce."

=== Fixation (2013) ===
On 10 November 2013, while sitting naked on the stone pavement in front of Lenin's Mausoleum on the Red Square, Moscow, Pavlensky hammered a large nail through his scrotum, affixing it to the stone pavement. His political art event coincided with the annual Russian Police Day. When the police arrived, they covered him with a blanket and later arrested him.

"A naked artist, looking at his testicles nailed to the cobblestone is a metaphor of apathy, political indifference, and fatalism of Russian society."

=== Freedom (2014) ===
On 23 February 2014 Pavlensky organized an event called Freedom inspired by Maidan and the 2014 Ukrainian revolution. The artist and his friends built an imitation barricade on Tripartite Bridge in Saint Petersburg, burned tires, and beat drums. The event was interrupted by Saint Petersburg police who arrested Pavlensky and his colleagues.

On 25 February 2014 Dzerzhinsky Criminal Court stopped the administrative case against Pavlensky on the accusations of hooliganism, and released him from custody. An investigation into Pavlensky's alleged violation of the regulations on political meetings continued. He was charged with vandalism due to the tire burning. During the investigation, Pavlensky secretly recorded his interrogation sessions with Pavel Yasman, the main investigating officer, and involved him into a discussion on the nature and meanings of political art. Yasman then quit his job at Russia’s Investigative Committee and began preparing to become a lawyer in order to defend Pavlensky. The transcript of their conversations was published as the Dialogues on art in several countries.

Pavlensky invited prostitutes to testify against him at his trial, explaining:

“They are prostitutes whom I paid so that they would come and testify. And it is equivalent to the testimony of other witnesses for the prosecution since they have just as much to do with the case. They have exactly the same motive.”

=== Segregation (2014) ===
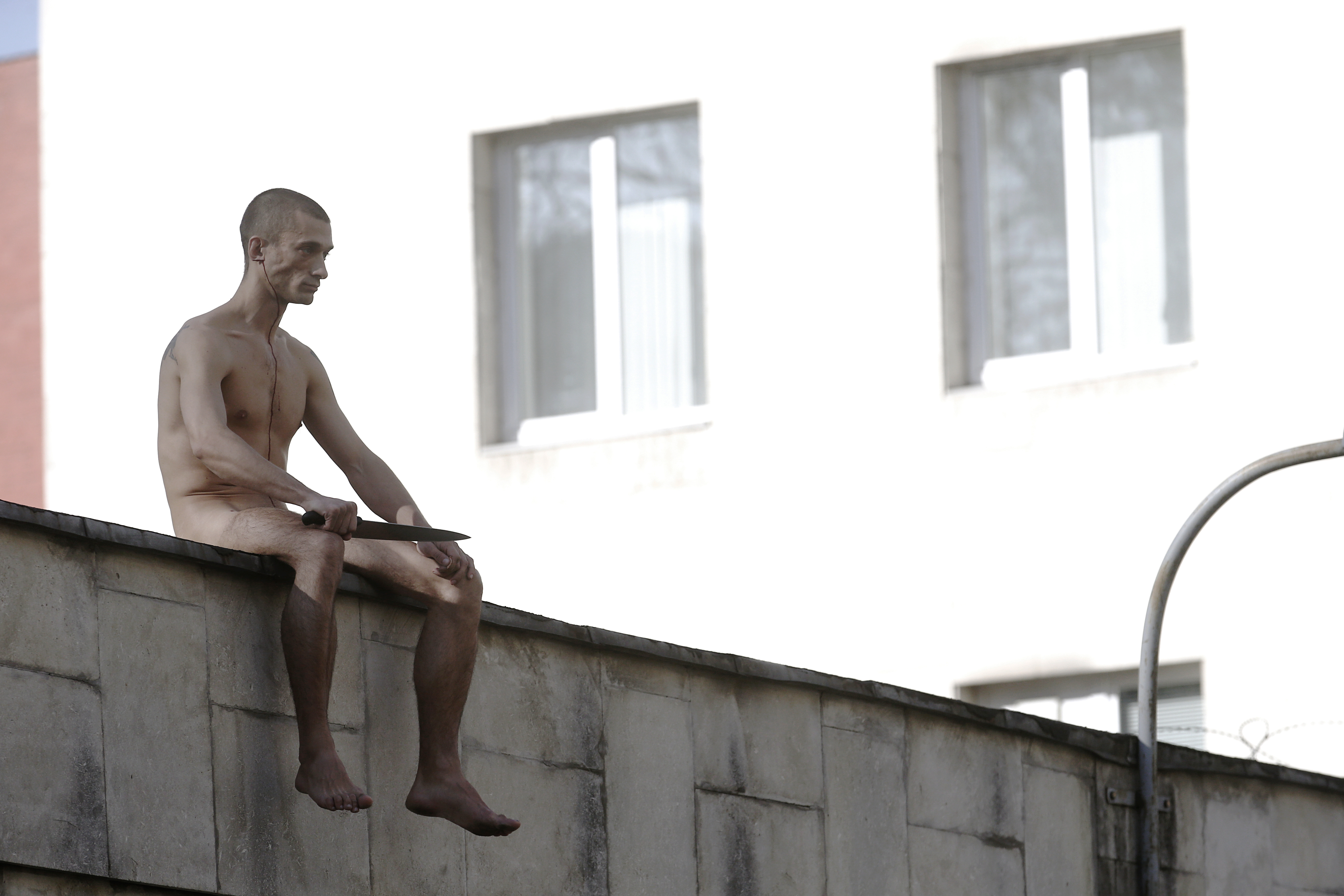
Segregation: Pavlensky moments after self-harming. Moscow, October 2014.

On 19 October 2014 Pavlensky cut off his earlobe with a chef's knife while sitting naked on the roof of the infamous Serbsky Center to make visible the political abuse of psychiatry in Russia. This art event was an homage to Van Gogh.

=== Threat (2015) ===
Pavlensky came to the first entrance of the Lubyanka Building, which is the headquarters of the Russian Federal Security Service, on 9 November 2015 at 1:15 a.m. Moscow time, doused the front door with gasoline, and set fire to it with a cigarette lighter. The doors of the building were partially burnt. Pavlensky stood and waited to be arrested, was detained after 30 seconds without resistance, and was charged with debauchery. A few hours after the event, a video appeared on the Internet with an explanation of the meaning of the burning.

The criminal case against Pavlensky was opened on 9 November 2015 under the "vandalism" section of Article 214 of the Russian criminal code. He was held in a psychiatric ward for a few weeks, and spent seven months in prison waiting for his trial.

According to gallerist Marat Gelman, the action shows Pavlensky's "obvious symbolism": "The Lubyanka door is the gate of hell, the entrance into the world of absolute evil. And against the backdrop of hellfire is a lonely artist, waiting to be captured ... Pavlensky's figure at the door of the FSB in flames - very important symbol for today's Russia, both political and artistic."

On 8 June 2016, the Moscow criminal court declared Pavlensky guilty of vandalism and sentenced him to a fine of 500,000 rubles, which Pavlensky refused to pay.

On 13 August 2016, Pavlensky gave a lecture in Odessa, Ukraine which ended with the inebriated Ukrainian journalist and screenwriter Vladimir Nestrenko instigating a fight that ended with his stabbing one of two security guards who tried to subdue him. The second of the two security guards suffered a fatal heart attack after the incident.

=== Lighting (2017) ===
On 16 October 2017, in his first political art event outside Russia, Pavlensky was arrested in Paris after setting fire to the street-level windows of an office of the Bank of France, located on the Place de la Bastille in Paris. He was charged with property damage, together with his accomplice Oksana Shalygina. He was initially detained in a psychiatric hospital unit, until a judge ordered him to be placed in pretrial detention at Fleury-Mérogis Prison. Pavlensky went on two dry hunger strikes while imprisoned, in protest at “lack of transparency” over legal process. He served eleven months in pretrial detention.

On 10 January 2019, Pavlensky was sentenced to three years in prison; his pre-trial detention was counted as time served and the remaining two years were suspended. Shalygina was sentenced to two years in prison, of which 16 months were spent on probation. In addition, the convicts were obliged to pay the Bank of France €18,678 as compensation for material damage and €3,000 for moral damage. According to the newspaper Le Matin, Pavlensky in response shouted in Russian "Never!". The trial also included the appearance of a blind man as a witness, who defended the artistic merit of the action by speaking about light and darkness as poetic symbols. Pavlensky dedicated his trial to the Marquis de Sade.

=== Pornopolitics (2020) ===
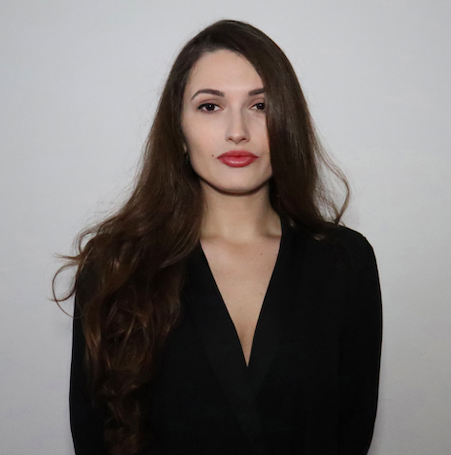
Alexandra de Taddeo

In 2020, Pavlensky created a new political art event titled "Pornopolitics," for which he launched a website presented as "the world's first porn resource to involve politicians or elected and appointed government officials". This event aimed to expose the lies of civil servants, politicians, and representatives of power who "impose puritanism on society while despising it".

On February 12 2020, the artist published intimate videos and sexually suggestive messages sent to a woman by the Parisian mayoral deputy, and mayoral candidate, Benjamin Griveaux. Pavlensky explained that this material demonstrated "the hypocrisy" of the candidate who campaigned by touting "traditional family values". Benjamin Griveaux then withdrew from the mayoral elections. Pornopolitique.com was censored three days after the beginning of the event.

Pavlensky was arrested and placed in police custody with his partner Alexandra De Taddeo who was the recipient of the sexually explicit content. They were tried on June 28, 2023. They invited art historians to testify, as well as actors to perform Moliere’s Tartuffe in court. The prosecution called for them to be given a six-month prison sentence and a fine of €50,000. On 11 October 2023 he received a six-month sentence, to be served outside prison with an electronic bracelet, while De Taddeo was given a six-month suspended sentence. They were fined €15,000 and ordered to pay €5,000 court costs. On January 31 2025, the Paris Court of Appeal overturned the decision and cleared De Taddeo of all charges. She declared it was a fair ruling as she was not a coauthor of Pavlensky's art project.

Pavlensky explained that this artwork was “entirely based on playing with aesthetic categories” with high style being juxtaposed to low style: "Essentially, it was the same as taking a portrait of a politician, made according to the rules of the high style and displayed for everyone to see, and adding to it a drawing of male genitalia". He also declared: “Everything that we have seen from the moment I have presented Pornopolitics to the public was in fact only one of the many episodes of the eternal collision between art and power. However, the fact that aesthetic categories continue to mean so much in today’s world is a real surprise to me”.

== Subject-Object Art ==
Sometimes considered as a representative of the third wave of Russian actionism or a political artist, Pavlensky says he has abandoned those terms and theorises his own art practice as what he calls Subject-Object Art.

Subject-Object Art is based on the existence of the phenomenon of power and the interaction between those who govern (subjects of power) and those who are governed (objects of power). Pavlensky explains that Subject-Object Art is about arranging a certain combination of circumstances, thereby forcing officials to proceed to exercise their powers of authority and thus realise the artist’s idea, namely, making power work for art. "Through that, a subject of power becomes an object of art, and what turns them into an object is their own power of authority".

Pavlensky also distinguishes photo documentation of "events" from "precedents", which are aesthetically valuable images and texts produced by officials during administrative and judicial proceedings that are selected by the artist, exhibited in art spaces, published as books or put on as plays and films.

== Exhibitions ==
In 2012, Pavlensky participated in the alumni and students art exhibition Oculus Two organized by the Pro Arte Foundation.

In 2013, in front of the State Hermitage Museum in Saint Petersburg, he organized a street art exhibition titled Ghosts of Identity, arising as a project from his journal Political Propaganda.

In 2017, Pavlensky participated in Art Riot at the Saatchi Gallery in London. This exhibition ranked among the top 10 most popular contemporary art exhibitions of the year.

Also in 2017, he participated in Beyond the Pleasure Principle at the Zachęta National Gallery of Art.

In 2018, his work appeared as part of the exhibition Us or Chaos at BPS22 and Talking about a Revolution at 22Visconti.

In 2018, Pack Gallery presented his work as part of the exhibition 439754, his prison number at Fleury-Mérogis Prison, where he was detained the previous year.

In 2019, ART4.RU Contemporary Art Museum presented Archives of Pyotr Pavlensky.

In 2022, his works were exhibited as part of the Politics in Art exhibition at MOCAK in Krakow. The decision to use his work Seam as promotional material for the exhibition was highly criticized by activists protesting against Russia's invasion of Ukraine; they demanded that the work be replaced by that of a Ukrainian artist. A petition signed by more than a hundred Ukrainian and Polish artists led the director of MOCAK, Maria Anna Potocka, to publicly defend her choice: "When we selected the works for the exhibition, we were looking for artists who express themselves on political matters and, at the same time, whose works have great artistic value”.

In 2022, Pavlensky presented Pornopolitics and Other Precedents, his first solo show in the UK. The exhibition, held at the London-based organisation a/political, is backed by Babestation. This exhibition of "precedents" unveils Pavlensky's theoretical framework, which he terms Subject-Object Art.

In 2022, his artworks Seam, Pornopolitics and Fixation were presented as parts of the Milky Way exhibition at the Contemporary Art Museum of Vojvodina, Serbia.

In 2023, his artwork Lighting was included as part of the Someone is Getting Rich exhibition at the TropenMuseum in Amsterdam.

In 2025, his work was included in the exhibition Everything is true - Nothing is permitted at Brutus Art Foundation, Rotterdam.

== Controversies ==
=== Sexual assault allegations ===
In early 2017, Pavlensky fled Russia with his partner Oksana Shalygina and their children amid allegations of sexual assault against the couple. Media in Russia reported that Anastasia Slonina, a young actress from the Moscow-based theatre Teatr.doc, had accused Pavlensky and Shalygina of sexually assaulting and then threatening her. Pavlensky and Shalygina denied the allegations and said the investigation was politically motivated; the case has similarities with the accusations against Russian historian Yury A. Dmitriev. In 2017, the couple were granted political asylum in France.

=== Invasion of privacy ===
In February 2020, Benjamin Griveaux, a former government minister, lodged a legal complaint following the release of videos of him performing a sex act on himself. Petr Pavlensky and his girlfriend were accused of invasion of privacy and “broadcasting images of a sexual nature without the permission of the person involved”. Pavlensky allegedly admitted to releasing the video on his website as part of his Pornopolitics event, saying he wanted to expose the minister's “hypocrisy”.

=== Intimate partner violence allegation ===
In November 2020 Pavlensky’s ex-partner Oksana Shalygina released a book and gave an interview to the website Wonderzine. She recounted experiencing severe physical abuse and sexual violence from Pavlensky.

In 2022, Pavlensky declared that Shalygina's book "was built on lies, interpretations and understatements ... But I do not want to comment on this situation in more detail, so as not to violate Shalygina's intention as an author".

=== Knife-wielding incident ===
Pavlensky was also accused of stabbing two people at a private party at his lawyer's home on 31 December 2019, which he denied. Wanted by French police for over five weeks, he was arrested in Paris on 15 February 2020.

On 29 August 2024, a trial was held for the knife-wielding incident. According to journalists from the newspapers Le Parisien and Le Point, Pavlensky explained his legal problems in France to the court by saying that he came to the country in 2017 because he admired the Marquis de Sade and considered him the most distinguished Frenchman in the world. However, he believes that the French do not like Sade and therefore do not like him. On 3 October 2024, Pavlensky was found guilty and sentenced to one year in prison, an electronic bracelet, and a five-year ban on carrying weapons.

== Awards ==
Pavlensky was awarded the Václav Havel Prize for Creative Dissent in 2016. The Prize was later withdrawn after Pavlensky announced his intention to dedicate it (and its monetary award) to an insurgent group and then explicitly endorsed the use of violence as a valid method to combat governmental oppression.

Pavlensky was also nominated for Russia's "Innovation" art prize in 2016, but was later barred by the National Centre for Contemporary Art on the grounds that he had broken the law, prompting four members of the jury to leave in protest.

== Bibliography ==
- Павленский П. А. О русском акционизме / Пётр Павленский. — М.: АСТ, 2016. — 288 с. — (Ангедония. Проект Данишевского). — ISBN 978-5-17-094344-9
- Pjotr Pawlenski. Pjotr Pawlenski Aktionen / Pjotr Pawlenski. — B.: CiconiaXCiconia, 2016. — ISBN ISBN 978-3-945867-04-4
- Pawlenski P.A. Pjotr Pawlenski: Der bürokratische Krampf und die neue Ökonomie politischer Kunst / Pjotr Pawlenski. — B.: Merve, 2016. — 127 с. — ISBN 978-3-88396-381-5
- Pawlenski P.A.Wladimir Velminski. Gefängnis des Alltäglichen / Pjotr Pawlenski, Wladimir Velminski. — B.: Matthis & Seitz, 2016. — 135 с. — ISBN 978-3-95757-377-3
- Pawlenski P.A. PAWLENSKI / Piotr Pawlenski. — W.: Krytyka Polityczna, 2016. — 291 с. — ISBN 978-83-65369-45-1
- Pavlenski P.A. Théorème / Piotr Pavlenski, Mariel Primois-Bizot. — P.: Editions Exils, 2020. — 180 с. — ISBN 978-2-914823-13-5
- Павленский П. А. Столкновение. — Городец, 2021. — 272 c. — ISBN 978-5-907483-05-7
- Piotr Pavlenski. Collision. — Au Diable Vauvert, 2022. — 336 c. — ISBN 979-10-307-0462-4
- Pyotr Pavlensky. Subject–Object Art Theory. — Seagull Books, 2025. — ISBN 978-1-80309-581-3

=== Translations ===
- Pavlenski P.A. LE CAS PAVLENSKI/ La politique comme art / Piotr Pavlenski. — P.: Louison editions, 2016. — 262 с. — ISBN 979-10-95454-06-9 (French)
- Petr Pavlenskij. Nudo con filo spinato - ilSaggiatore, 2019 - ISBN 978-88-428-2530-2 (Italian)
- Pëtr Pavlenskij. Collisioni - Suddenthoughts, 2023 - ISBN 978-8894700817 (Italian)

=== Further reading ===
- Sven Spieker. Destruction — Whitechapel Gallery/MIT Press, 2017 — 240 c. — ISBN 978-0-85488-258-8
- Pierre Bergounioux. Russe — Fario, 2021 - 48 c. — ISBN 979-10-91902-73-1
- Michaël La Chance. Les inventeurs de vacarmes : Théorie et pratiques de la performance — Presses du réel, 2021 — ISBN 978-2-924298-51-0
- Sandra Frimmel. Art Judgments: Art on Trial in Russia after Perestroika — Vernon Press, 2022 — 320 c. — ISBN 978-1-62273-277-7
- Aliide Naylor. Individual agents of change and state response: Performance art and its impact in contemporary Russia
- Pedro Alberto Cruz Sanchez. Arte y Performance. Una historia desde las vanguardias hasta la actualidad — AKAL, 2022 — 672 c. — ISBN 978-84-460-5162-6
- Jenny Doussan, Boris Groys, Michael La Chance, Victor Misiano, Daniel Neofetou, Pyotr Pavlensky, Julian Stallabrass, Sarah Wilson. Pornopolitics and Other Precedents — MOTHER, 2022 — 104 c. — ISBN 979-10-415-0298-1
- Alexandra De Taddeo. L’Amour — Privé/Michel Lafon, 2023 — 368 c. — ISBN 978-2-35076-164-0
- Fernanda Eberstadt. Bite Your Friends: Stories of the Body Militant. Europa Editions, 2024, pp. 165-191. ISBN 979-8-88966-006-4

== Films ==
- Pavlensky, Man and Might, Irene Langemann, 2016
- Pavlensky, Life naked, Daria Khrenova, 2016
- Crash Test, Mina Angela Naskova Ighnatova, David Antoine Combe, 2023

== Copycat performance ==
On 5 November 2020 outside Moscow's Federal Security Service (FSB), artist Pavel Krisevich "replicated the crucifixion of Jesus Christ while other activists in raincoats labeled “FSB” doused the surrounding area with a harmless burning liquid and scattered folders signifying criminal cases".
