= Jules Simiand Brocherie =

French entrepreneur (born 2002)

- Born: 1 December 2002 (age 23)
- Occupation: Entrepreneur

Jules Simiand Brocherie (born 1 December 2002) is a French entrepreneur.

== Early life and education ==
Jules Simiand Brocherie was born on 1 December 2002. He attended Lycée Notre‑Dame‑de‑Sainte‑Croix, where he completed a French Baccalauréat in Economic and Social Sciences (Bac ES). He then briefly enrolled at IE University in Spain before leaving after one year to focus on the development of ExtraStudent.

== Career ==
During the COVID-19 pandemic, at age 17 he launched a peer-to-peer educational support platform initially called Élèves Solidaires. In May 2023, his app—renamed ExtraStudent—surpassed 100,000 users and secured €1.5 million in funding from several major backers, including former minister Benjamin Griveaux, Michael Benabou (co-founder of Veepee), Groupe M6, and Adrien Montfort (co-founder of Sorare). In 2024, ExtraStudent announced a partnership with Sciences Po (Paris).

== Awards and honours ==
- 2021: Youth Civics Prize (Ordre National du Mérite, Hauts-de-Seine committee) with commendation from the President of the Republic.
- 2022: Forbes 30 Under 30 (France).
