= Jean-Charles Colas-Roy =

French politician

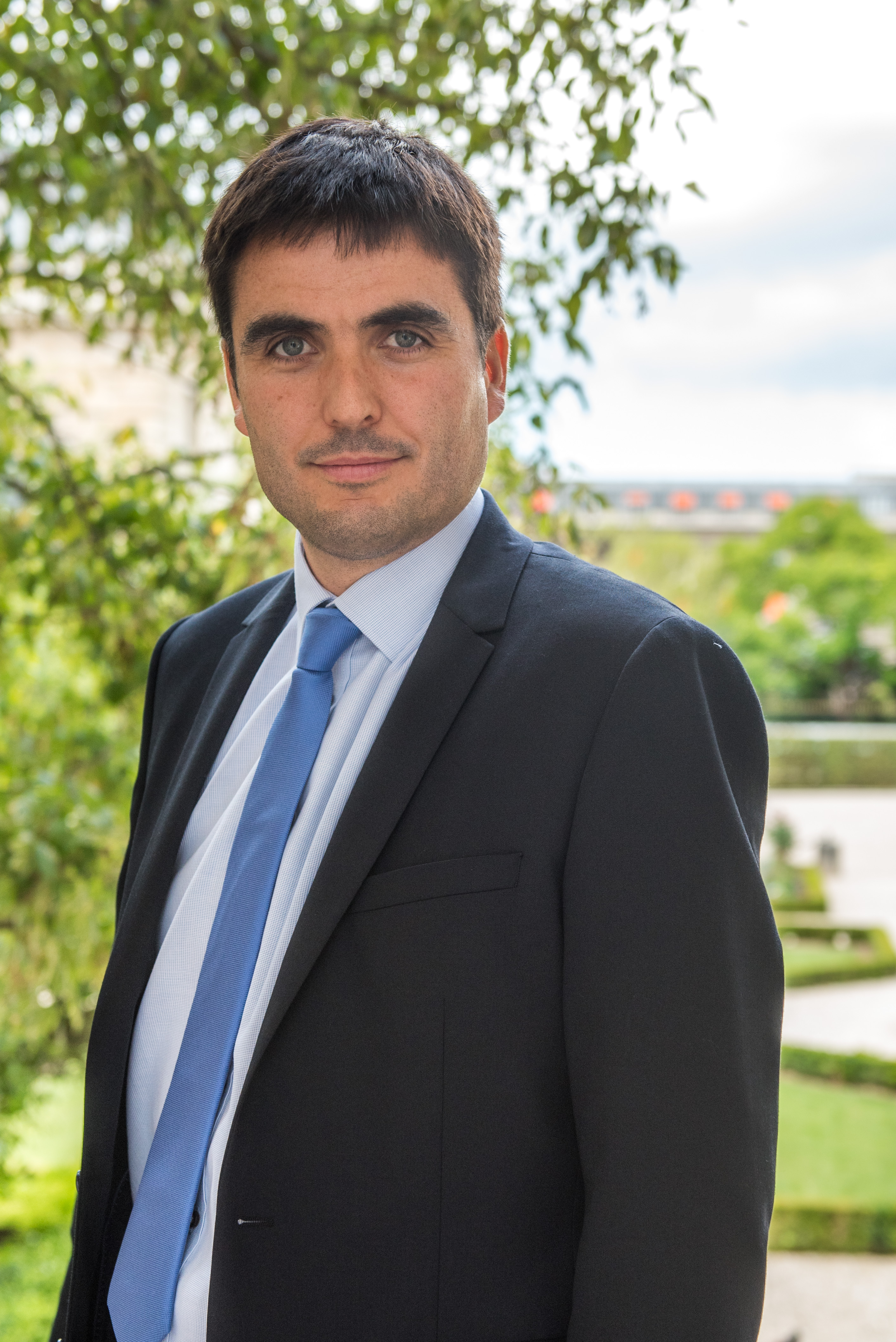

Member of the National Assembly for Isère's 2nd constituency
- In office 21 June 2017 – 21 June 2022
- Preceded by: Michel Issindou
- Succeeded by: Cyrielle Chatelain

Personal details
- Born: 2 May 1978 (age 48) Montpellier, France
- Party: Renaissance; Territories of Progress
- Education: Grenoble Institute of Technology

Jean-Charles Colas-Roy (born 2 May 1978) is a French politician of La République En Marche! (LREM) who was a member of the French National Assembly from 2017 to 2022, representing the department of Isère.

== Political career ==
Colas-Roy joined the Socialist Party (PS) following right-wing candidate Jean-Marie Le Pen's qualification for the second round of the 2002 presidential election. He eventually left the PS in 2014.

In parliament, Colas-Roy served on the Committee on Sustainable Development and Spatial Planning. From 2019 until 2020, he was also a member of the Committee on Legal Affairs. In this capacity, he was in charge of environmental issues within LREM. In addition to his committee assignments, he was part of the French-Spanish Parliamentary Friendship Group.

In September 2018, following the appointment of François de Rugy to the government, Colas-Roy supported the candidacy of Barbara Pompili as president of the National Assembly. When Richard Ferrand was elected instead, he stood as a candidate to succeed him as chairman of the LREM parliamentary group. His candidacy was endorsed by Pompili, among others. In an internal vote, however, he came in sixth out of seven; the position went to Gilles Le Gendre instead.

He lost his seat to Cyrielle Chatelain of EELV in the second round of the 2022 election.

== Political positions ==
In October 2020, Colas-Roy publicly opposed the government of Prime Minister Jean Castex when he called for fellow MPs to vote against the reintroduction of neonicotinoid pesticides to fight a disease affecting beetroots.
