= Cyrielle Chatelain =

French politician (born 1987)

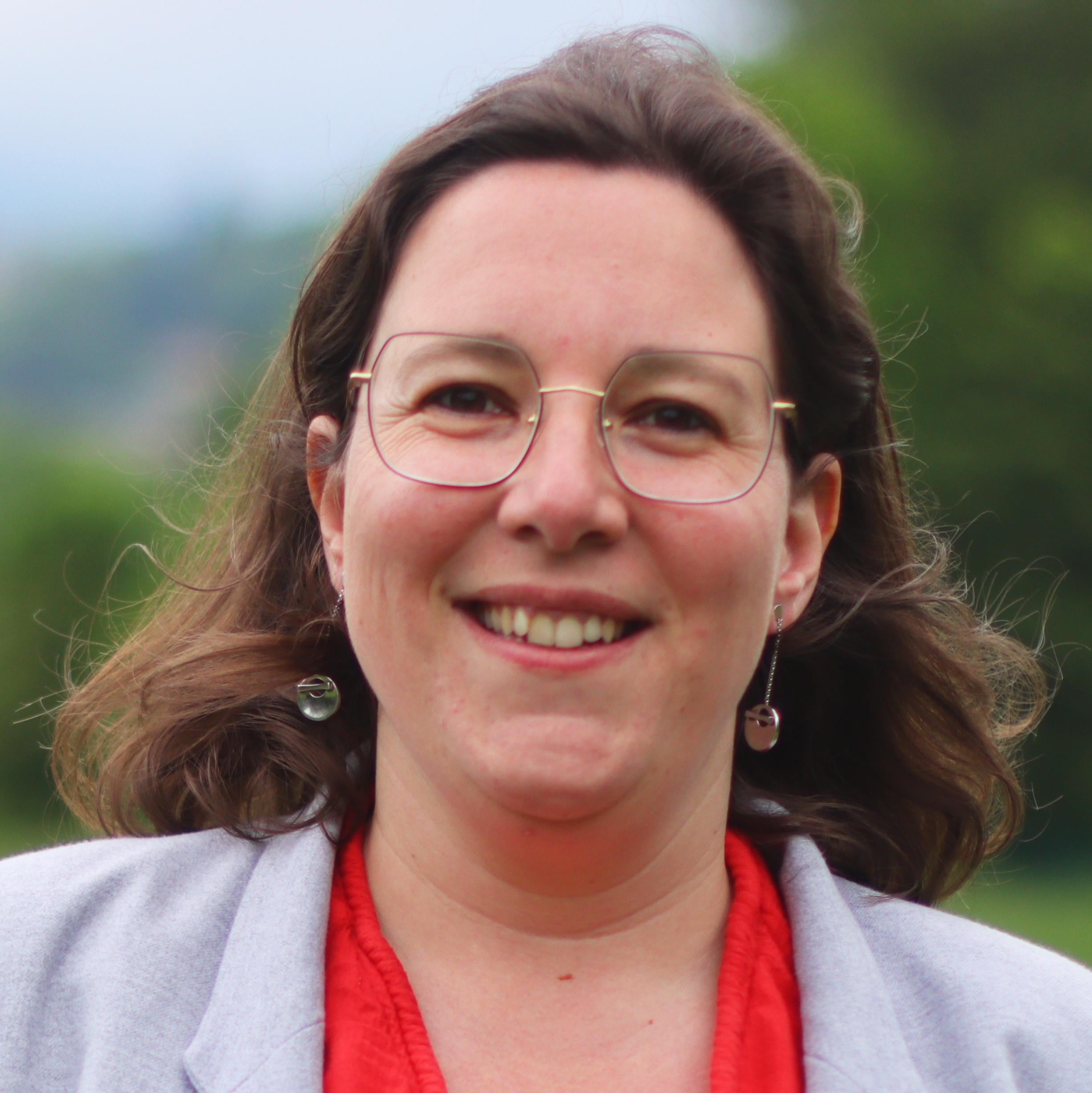
- Cyrielle Chatelain in 2022

President of the Ecologist Group in the National Assembly
- Incumbent
- Assumed office 23 June 2022
- Preceded by: Cécile Duflot

Member of the National Assembly for Isère's 2nd constituency
- Incumbent
- Assumed office 22 June 2022
- Preceded by: Jean-Charles Colas-Roy

Personal details
- Born: 15 July 1987 (age 38) Montbéliard, France
- Party: The Ecologists
- Children: 2

Cyrielle Chatelain (born 15 July 1987) is a French politician. She was one of two co-presidents of the Ecologist Group in the National Assembly of France in 2022, and the deputy for Isère's 2nd constituency.

== Early life and professional career ==
Cyrielle Chatelain comes from a family of left-wing activists – her parents, both special education teachers, support Greenpeace and the anti-nuclear movement. Her father, Philippe, was a candidate in the 2007 legislative elections in the first constituency of Haute-Saône; she put up posters for him on that occasion.

She joined the Greens in 2006, at the age of 18, and held the position of federal co-secretary of the Young Ecologists from 2008 to 2010. She works for a federation of housing integration associations.

She holds a double bachelor's degree in philosophy and political science, and a master's in entrepreneurship in the social economy.

From 2012 to 2014, she worked as a parliamentary assistant to Éric Alauzet, an ecologist deputy from the Doubs region, and from 2015 to 2018, she was in charge of the housing file in the office of Christophe Ferrari, President of the Grenoble Metropolitan Council. In this role, she is responsible for housing the homeless and runs outreach campaigns with Grenoble's SAMU Social. From 2020 until her election as Member of Parliament, she served as a technical advisor to Bruno Bernard, President of the Lyon Metropolitan Council.

In 2014, she campaigned for her party not to join the First Valls government after the departures of Cécile Duflot and Pascal Canfin. In the 2021 Green party presidential primary, she supports Éric Piolle. He presents her as one of "the three people responsible for building [his] program".

== Political career ==
Following her election to the National Assembly in 2022, she was joint president of the Ecologist Group in the assembly with Julien Bayou. In September 2022, Bayou withdrew from leadership after accusations of psychological violence from an ex-partner, leaving Chatelain as sole president of the group.

== Election ==
As part of the New Ecological and Social People's Union (NUPES) coalition for the 2022 legislative elections, and still affiliated with The Ecologists (EELV), Cyrielle Chatelain is running in Isère's 2nd constituency, with Alban Rosa, La France Insoumise municipal councilor in Échirolles, as her deputy. On June 19, 2022, she won the election against incumbent MP Jean-Charles Colas-Roy (La République en marche) with 52.13% of the vote. In doing so, she has brought back to the left a constituency with a long-standing left-wing tradition.

On June 23, 2022, she was elected co-chair of the ecologist group with Julien Bayou. Unknown to the general public at the time, she was chosen unanimously, despite the fact that several better-known personalities, such as Sandrine Rousseau and Delphine Batho, had been shortlisted. Equal co-presidency is a standard practice for the Ecologist Group, already in force during the 2012-2017 term. Following Julien Bayou's withdrawal from the co-presidency on September 27, 2022, Cyrielle Chatelain assumed the role of sole president.

== Legislative activity ==
At the French National Assembly, she sits on the National Defence and Armed Forces Committee.

On October 24, 2022, she tabled the NUPES intergroup's first motion of censure against the Élisabeth Borne government following the use of Article 49.3 to engage the government's responsibility for the 2023 Finance Bill in order to shorten parliamentary debate.

She worked actively on the law to accelerate the production of renewable energies.

On December 6, 2023, she tabled a motion for prior rejection of the immigration bill, which was adopted by the National Assembly on December 11, 2023, leading Interior Minister Gérald Darmanin to submit his resignation, which was promptly rejected by French President Emmanuel Macron.

=== Legislative elections 2024 ===
Under the New Popular Front banner, Cyrielle Chatelain was re-elected in the 2024 legislative elections with 62.07% of the vote against Édouard Robert of the National Rally. On July 16, she was re-elected president of the ecologist and social group at the French National Assembly.

At one stage, she was considered as a candidate for the presidency of the National Assembly on behalf of the New Popular Front; in the end, the Communist deputy André Chassaigne was designated by the coalition as its candidate for the perch.

== Personal life ==
Cyrielle Chatelain lives in Eybens, a commune in her constituency in the Grenoble conurbation, with her partner, a doctor in information-communication. She is the mother of two daughters.
