= Claude-Gérard Marcus =

French politician (1933–2020)

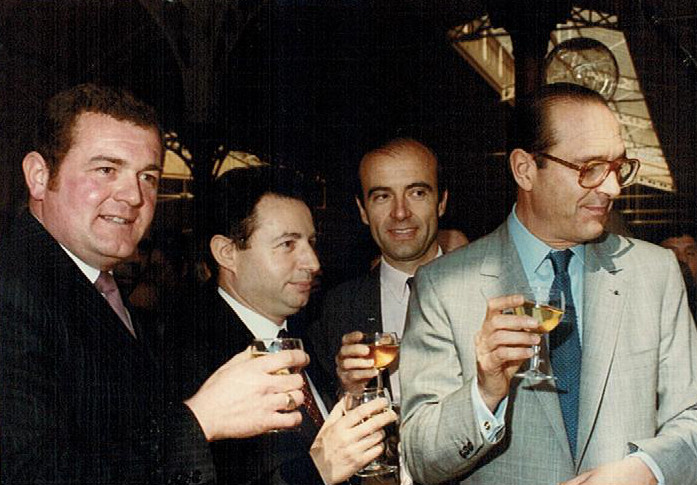
- From left: Bernard Quesson, Claude-Gérard Marcus, Alain Juppé and Jacques Chirac in 1988

Deputy of the National Assembly for Paris's 8th constituency
- In office 11 July 1968 – 1 April 1986
- Preceded by: Jean-Charles Leppidi
- Succeeded by: position abolished, constituencies redrawn

Mayor of the 10th arrondissement of Paris
- In office 13 March 1983 – 19 March 1989
- Preceded by: position established
- Succeeded by: Claude Challal

Member of the French National Assembly for Paris
- In office 2 April 1986 – 14 May 1988

Member of the French National Assembly for Paris's 5th constituency
- In office 14 May 1988 – 21 April 1997
- Preceded by: position established, constituencies redrawn
- Succeeded by: Tony Dreyfus

Personal details
- Born: 24 August 1933 16th arrondissement of Paris, France
- Died: 22 July 2020 (aged 86) 12th arrondissement of Paris, France
- Party: UDR; RPR

Claude-Gérard Marcus (24 August 1933 – 24 July 2020) was a French politician.

== Biography ==
Marcus was born in 1933 in the 16th arrondissement of Paris. He was the son of Paul Marcus, a doctor and art dealer. He was able to escape the roundups by Nazi Germany during World War II. In addition to his political career, he chaired the Musée d'Art Juif and helped establish the Musée d'Art et d'Histoire du Judaïsme, of which he was the President until 2001. He subsequently became Honorary President. He also co-chaired the Association Nationale Judaïsme et Liberté.

Claude-Gérard Marcus died in Paris on 24 July 2020 at the age of 86.

== Distinctions ==
- Officer of the Legion of Honour

== Publications ==
- Du sens de l'histoire aux pensées uniques : Quelques vérités d'un ancien député gaulliste (2001)
