= Tony Dreyfus =

French politician (1939–2023)

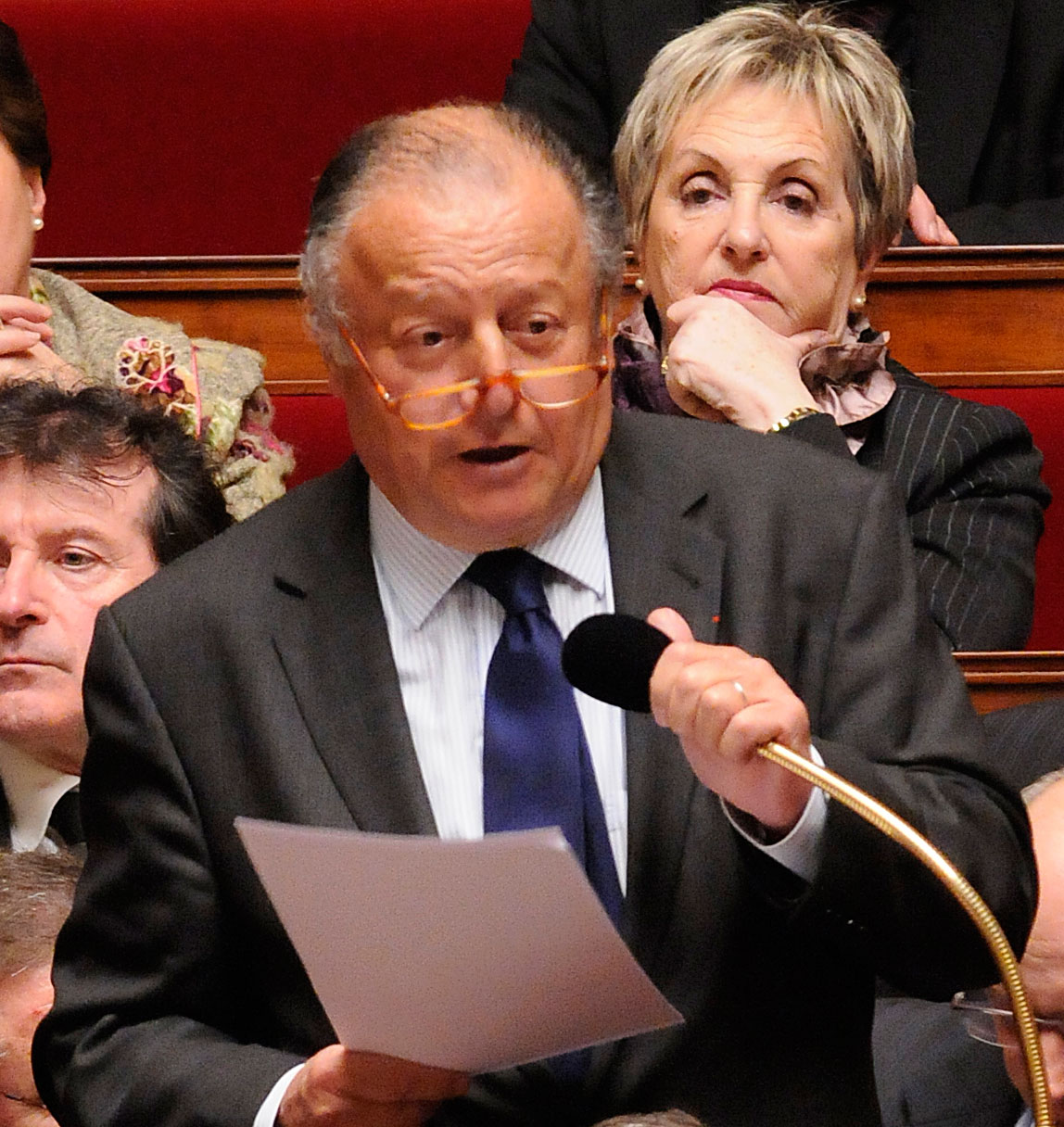
- Dreyfus at the National Assembly in 2010

Member of the National Assembly for Paris's 5th constituency
- In office 12 June 1997 – 19 June 2012
- Preceded by: Claude-Gérard Marcus
- Succeeded by: Seybah Dagoma

Mayor of the 10th arrondissement of Paris
- In office 25 June 1995 – 16 March 2008
- Preceded by: Claude Challal
- Succeeded by: Rémi Féraud

Personal details
- Born: Tony Charles Louis Dreyfus; 9 January 1939 16th arrondissement of Paris, France
- Died: 26 April 2023 (aged 84) 7th arrondissement of Paris, France
- Party: Socialist Party
- Spouse: Françoise Fabre-Luce
- Children: 5
- Parent(s): Louis Dreyfus; Winnifred Gabbaï
- Profession: Lawyer

Tony Charles Louis Dreyfus (9 January 1939 – 26 April 2023) was a French politician. A member of the National Assembly of France from 1997 to 2012, he represented the city of Paris, and was a member of the Socialiste, radical, citoyen et divers gauche. Dreyfus died in Paris on 26 April 2023, at the age of 84.
