= David Cormand =

French politician (born 1974)

David Cormand MEP
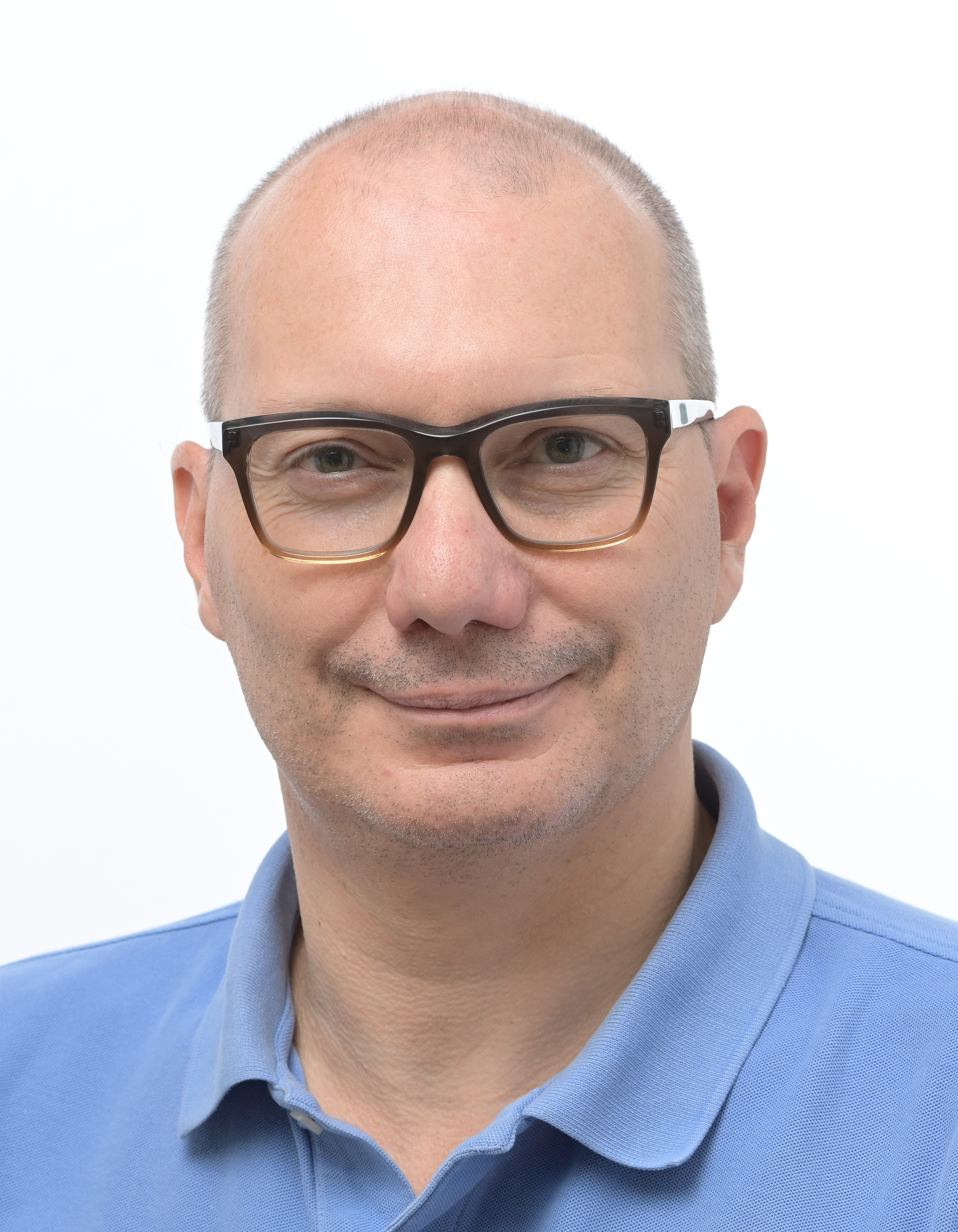

Member of the European Parliament
- Incumbent
- Assumed office 2 July 2019
- Constituency: France

National secretary of Europe Ecology – The Greens
- In office 11 February 2016 – 30 November 2019
- Preceded by: Emmanuelle Cosse
- Succeeded by: Julien Bayou

Personal details
- Born: 30 November 1974 (age 51) Mont-Saint-Aignan, France
- Party: The Greens (1999–2010); Europe Ecology – The Greens / The Ecologists (2010–present)
- Education: University of Rouen

David Cormand (born 30 November 1974) is a French politician who was elected as a Member of the European Parliament (MEP) in 2019 and re-elected in 2024. A member of Europe Ecology – The Greens (EELV), he was its national secretary from 2016 to 2019. Cormand also served as a regional councillor of Haute-Normandie from 2007 to 2015 and a municipal councillor of Canteleu from 2001 until 2020.

== Political career ==
In the European Parliament, Cormand has served on the Committee on Budgets and the Committee on the Internal Market and Consumer Protection. In 2020, he also joined the Special Committee on Artificial Intelligence in a Digital Age.

In addition to his committee assignments, Cormand is part of the European Parliament's delegations with the Korean Peninsula and to the ACP–EU Joint Parliamentary Assembly. He is also a member of the European Parliament Intergroup on the Welfare and Conservation of Animals.
