= Lip sewing =

Form of body modification

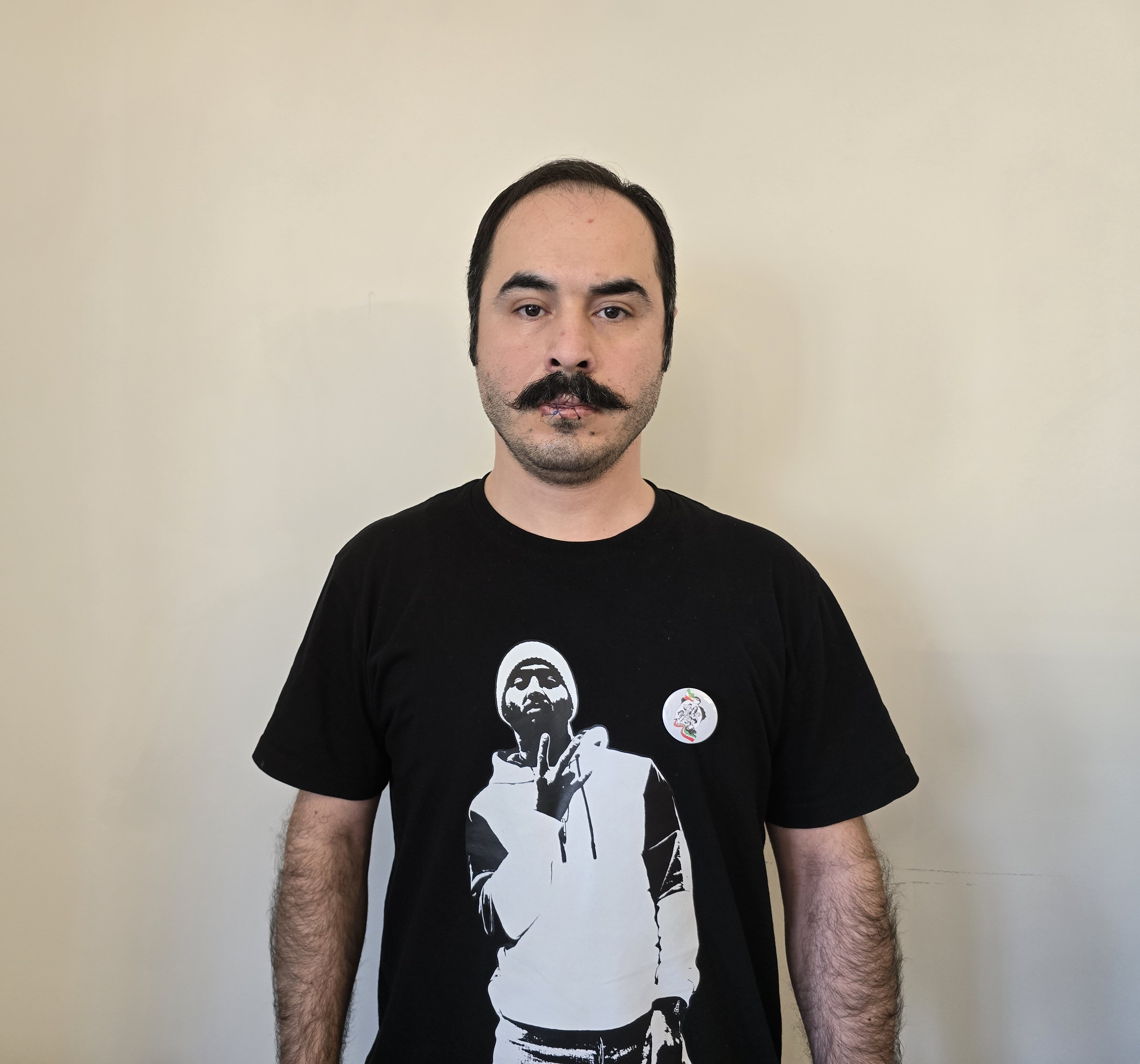
A man with his mouth sewed shut

Lip sewing or mouth sewing, the operation of stitching together human lips, is a form of body modification. It may be carried out for aesthetic or religious reasons or as a form of protest.

Sutures are often used to stitch the lips together, though sometimes piercings are made with needle blades or cannulas and monofilament is threaded through the holes. There is usually a fair amount of swelling, but permanent scarring is rare.

== Body modification culture ==
Lip sewing may be done for aesthetic reasons, or to aid meditation by helping the mind to focus by removing the temptation to speak.

BMEzine, an online magazine for body modification culture, published an article about a 23-year-old film student Inza, whose quest for body modifications was very varied. She spoke about her experiences with lip sewing as a form of play piercing.

== As a protest ==
- On January 19, 2002, nearly 60 detainees in Australia's biggest camp for asylum seekers sewed their lips together in protest over delays in processing their visa applications.
- On March 19, 2003, J. Theodore Carson, a student at Missouri State University in Springfield, Missouri, sewed his mouth shut to protest the invasion of Iraq and maintained his job working in the campus writing center at this time.
- On July 3, 2006, 65 inmates in the Belgrade Central Prison sewed their mouths shut in protest of slow court procedures and poor living conditions. Earlier, in April, an inmate sewed his lips and tongue shut in order to avoid court hearing for a bank heist.
- On June 4, 2012, two asylum seekers sewed their lips together in protest against the Bavarian and German asylum policies.
- On July 27, 2013, German drag queen Barbie Breakout sewed her mouth shut to protest homophobic violence and the Russian federal law "for the Purpose of Protecting Children from Information Advocating for a Denial of Traditional Family Values".
- During the 2014 Venezuelan protests, a small group of students in Venezuela sewed their mouths shut in protest due to students being arrested for protesting and to show the Venezuelan government that their food fasting is "permanent, prolonged and serious".
- On September 14, 2018, Femen activists protested by sewing their lips in France to support Russian artist Petr Pavlensky.
