= Seybah Dagoma =

French politician

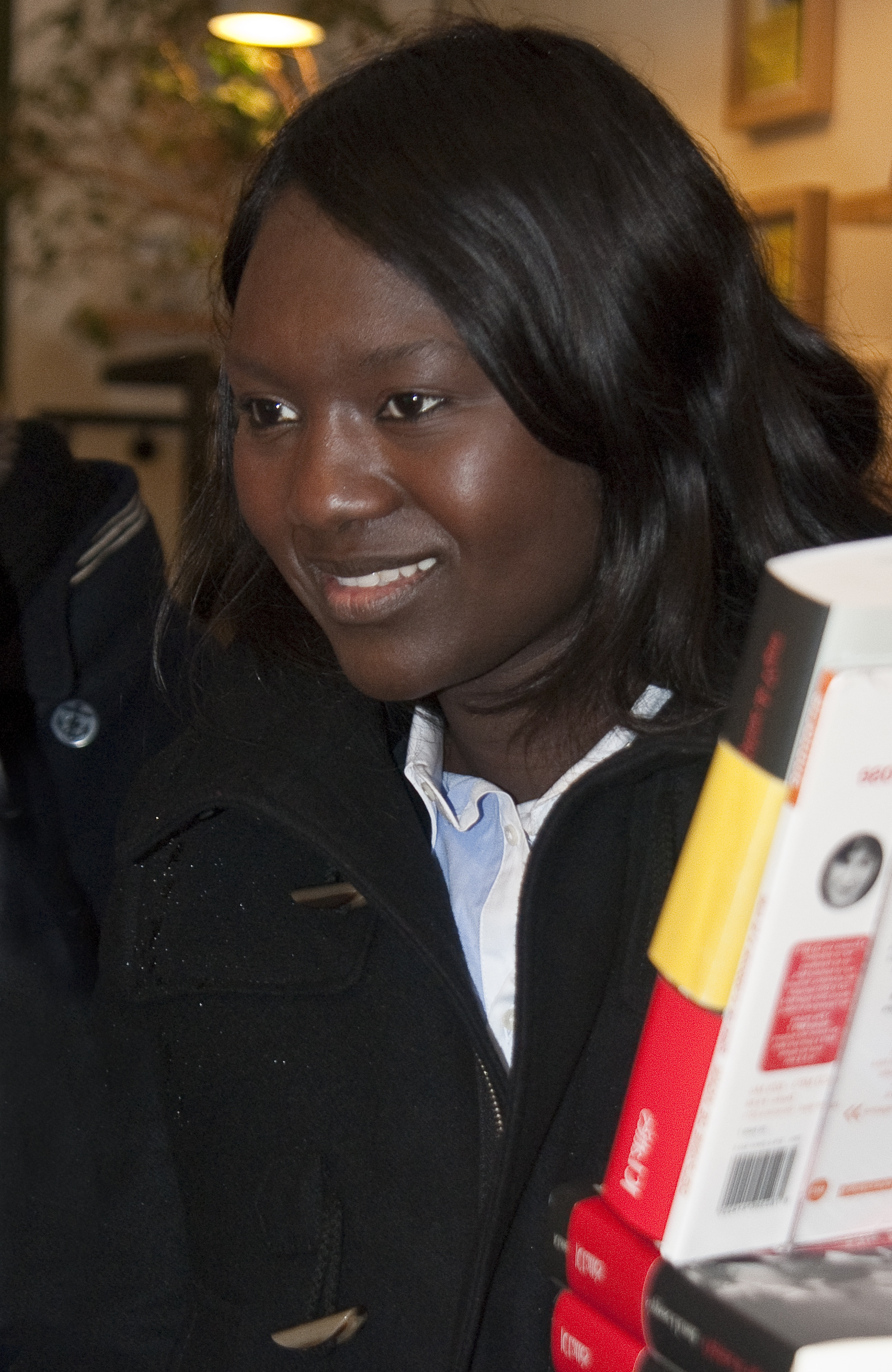

Member of the National Assembly for Paris's 5th constituency
- In office 20 June 2012 – 20 June 2017
- Preceded by: Tony Dreyfus
- Succeeded by: Benjamin Griveaux

Leader of the Socialist Group in the National Assembly Acting
- In office 6 December 2016 – 13 December 2016
- Preceded by: Bruno Le Roux
- Succeeded by: Olivier Faure

Personal details
- Born: 9 June 1978 (age 48) Nantes, France
- Party: Socialist Party
- Education: Paris 1 Panthéon-Sorbonne University; École des Ponts ParisTech
- Profession: Lawyer

Seybah Dagoma (born 9 June 1978) is a French lawyer and politician of the Socialist Party who served as a member of the French National Assembly on 17 June 2012, representing the department of Paris.

== Early life and education ==
Born to immigrants from Chad in Nantes in 1978, Dagoma grew up in a low-income housing project in Sarcelles. She studied law at the University of Paris 1 Panthéon-Sorbonne.

== Career ==
In parliament, Dagoma served on the Committee on Foreign Affairs and the Committee on European Affairs. She was also her parliamentary group’s rapporteur on foreign trade. In her addition to her committee assignments, Dagoma was part of the National Assembly’s friendship groups with India, South Africa and Turkey.

During her time in parliament, Dagoma was the only member of sub-Saharan immigrant background.

Since 2016, Dagoma has been serving as president of Business France.

== Other activities ==
- Terra Nova, Member of the Board of Directors

Party political offices
Preceded by Bruno Le Roux	Leader of the Socialist Group in the National Assembly; Acting; 2016	Succeeded by Olivier Faure
