= Élise Fajgeles =

French politician (born 1970)

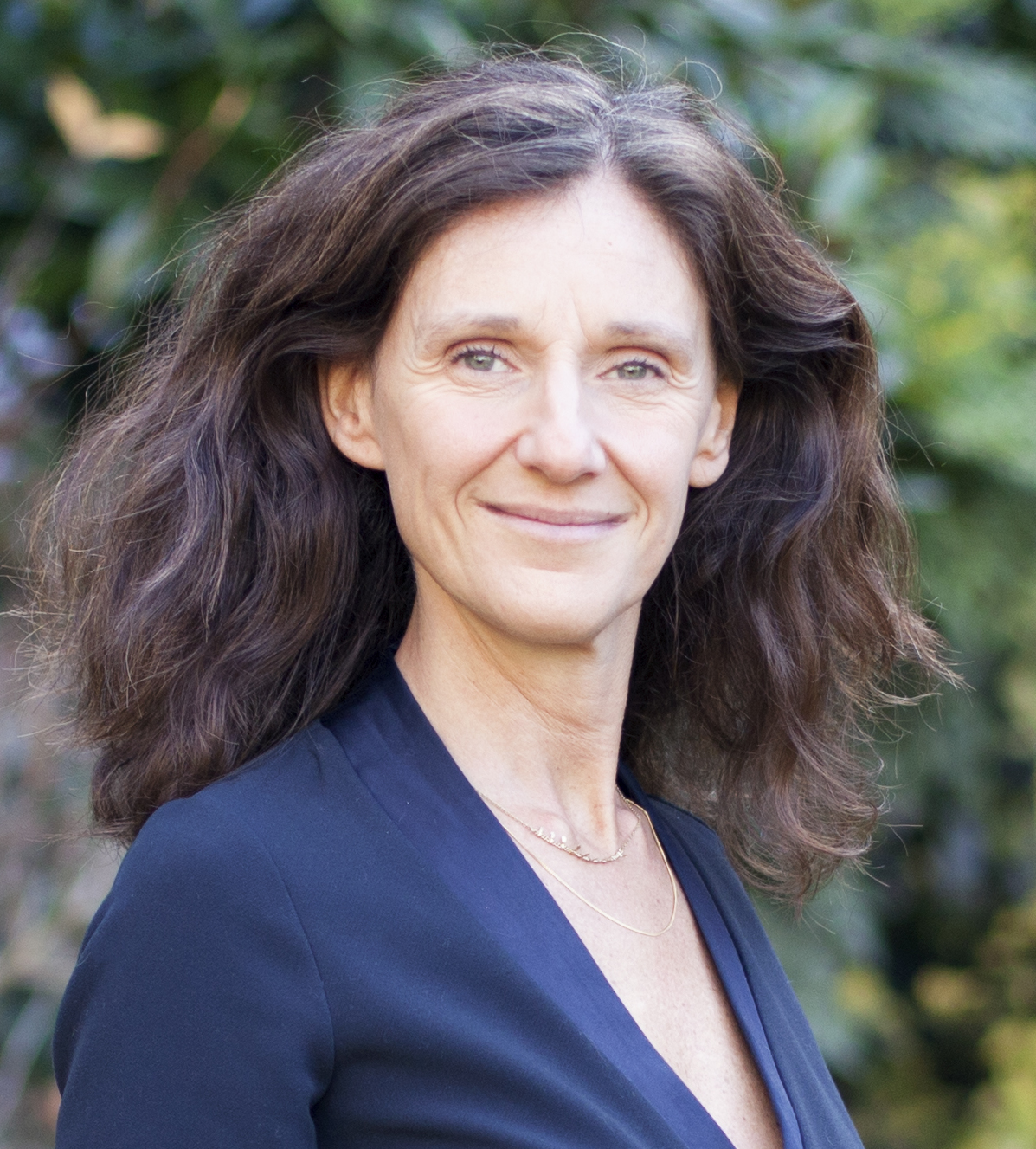

Member of the National Assembly for Paris's 5th constituency
- In office 22 July 2017 – 27 April 2019
- Preceded by: Benjamin Griveaux
- Succeeded by: Benjamin Griveaux

Personal details
- Born: 6 July 1970 (age 55) Sartrouville, France
- Party: La République En Marche!

Élise Fajgeles (born 6 July 1970) is a French politician who served as the member of the National Assembly for the 5th constituency of Paris from 2017 to 2019. A member of La République En Marche! (LREM), she replaced Benjamin Griveaux as his substitute upon his appointment as Secretary of State to the Minister of the Economy and Finance. Griveaux returned to Parliament two years later after stepping down from his Government Spokesman position.

== Early life ==
Fajgeles was born in Sartrouville, Yvelines. Her grandparents were Polish Jews.

== Political career ==
At the 2017 French legislative election, Fajgeles was the substitute candidate for Benjamin Griveaux in Paris's 5th constituency. Fajgeles became a member of the National Assembly following Griveaux's appointment to the government as Secretary of State to the Minister of the Economy and Finance on 22 July 2017. She left Parliament in 2019.
