= Michel Issindou =

French politician

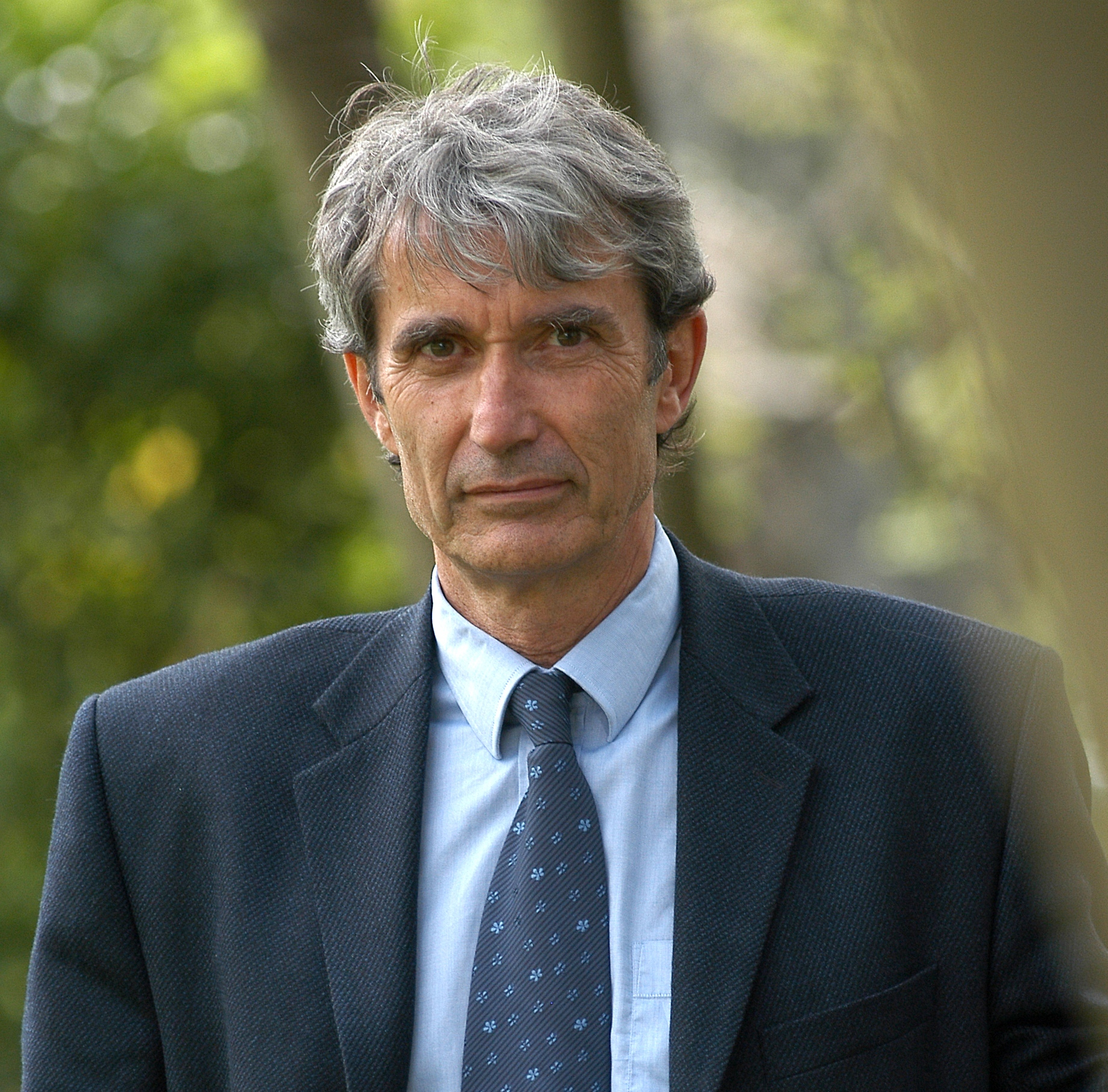
- Michel Issindou in 2005

Member of the National Assembly for Isère's 2nd constituency
- In office 17 June 2007 – 20 June 2017
- Preceded by: Gilbert Biessy
- Succeeded by: Jean-Charles Colas-Roy

Personal details
- Born: 12 July 1952 (age 72); Cahors, France
- Political party: Socialist Party
- Profession: Civil servant

Michel Issindou (born 12 July 1952) was a member of the National Assembly of France. He represented the Isère's 2nd constituency from 2007 to 2017, as a member of the Socialiste, radical, citoyen et divers gauche.
