= Julien Bayou =

French activist and politician

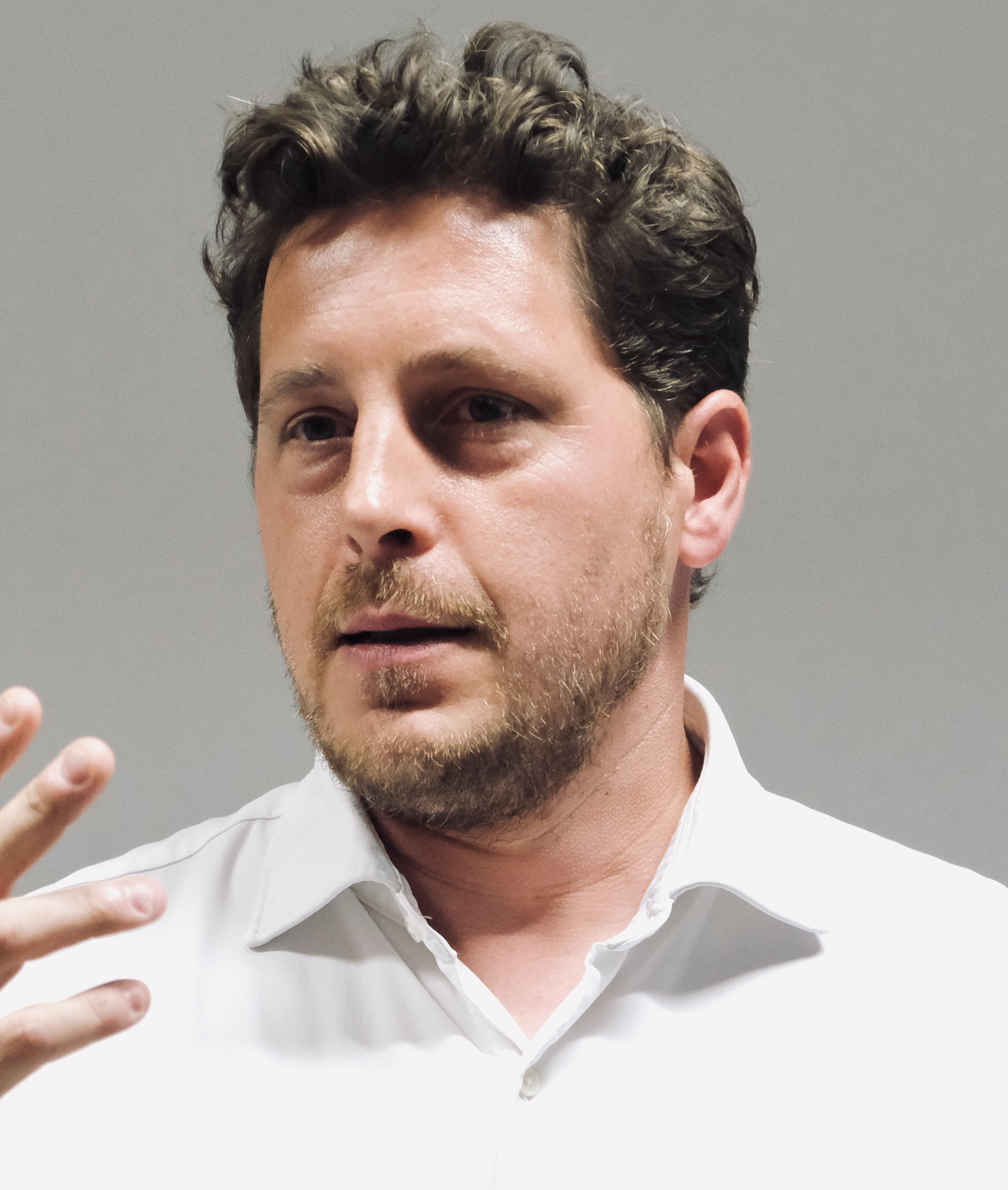
- Bayou in 2023

Member of the National Assembly for Paris's 5th constituency
- In office 22 June 2022 – 9 June 2024
- Preceded by: Benjamin Griveaux
- Succeeded by: Pouria Amirshahi

National secretary of Europe Ecology – The Greens
- In office 30 November 2019 – 26 September 2022
- Preceded by: David Cormand
- Succeeded by: Marine Tondelier

Member of the Regional Council of Île-de-France
- In office 26 March 2010 – 9 september 2022

Personal details
- Born: 11 June 1980 (age 46) Paris, France
- Party: Europe Ecology – The Greens
- Education: Sciences Po; Sciences Po Strasbourg
- Occupation: Lawyer

Julien Bayou (born 11 June 1980) is a French activist, lawyer and politician who has represented the 5th constituency of Paris in the National Assembly from 2022 to 2024. A member of the Europe Ecology – The Greens (EELV) party, he served as its national secretary from 2019 until his resignation in 2022.

In September 2022, he withdrew from the co-presidency (leaving Cyrielle Chatelain as sole president) of the environmental group in the National Assembly and resigned from the post of national secretary of Europe Ecology – The Greens after accusations of psychological violence by an ex-companion, relayed by his opponent inside the party Sandrine Rousseau.

Subsequently, the case was closed without further action. It is also worth noting that his lawyer, Marie Dosé, was later placed under formal investigation for “concealment or alteration” of evidence in the Caubère case. He left Europe Ecology – The Greens and active politics. He now works as a lawyer, focusing on cases related to social justice and environmental protection.

== Family and education ==
Julien Bayou was born into a leftist family. His father was an architect before becoming a healer in Béziers, and his mother, a teacher of economic and social sciences, "a real Maoist", who helped the FLN. His grandmother Marguerite is the former mayor of Saint-Chinian and his grandfather is Raoul Bayou, a former socialist deputy mayor of Cessenon-sur-Orb. Bayou studied at Lycée Turgot in Paris, before entering the Institute of Political Studies in Strasbourg and then the Institute of Political Studies in Paris. He obtained a degree in international economics, carried out in part during an internship in the writing of Alternatives Economiques, drawing up an inventory of internships in companies in France. In 2011, he obtained a law degree by taking correspondence courses.

== Professional career ==
After his studies, he worked at the Ministry of National Education and as a consultant for UNESCO. From 2005 to 2008, he was project manager for Africa within Coordination SUD (the French coordination of international solidarity NGOs). In 2008, he left the NGO to set up a "communication and mobilization consultancy" cooperative with his friend and partner Lionel Primault.

In 2013, he was in charge of campaigns for Avaaz, an NGO which mobilizes on various international issues, such as climate change, human rights, corruption and poverty. It is in this context that he takes part in the campaign to liberate the young Sevil Sevimli, a Franco-Turkish student imprisoned in Turkey for having participated in a concert.

In 2022, he leads the Green coalition into the Nouvelle Union Populaire Ecologique et Sociale ("NUPES") in the French parliamentary elections. He wins his seat representing the 5th constituency of Paris and is then elected as co-president of the green parliamentary group in the National Assembly.

As a lawyer, he notably works to ensure the educational rights of children with disabilities are respected. Bayou represents an environmental association and obtained a court order requiring TotalEnergies to dismantle its LNG terminal in Le Havre.

== Books ==
- Le Petit Livre noir du logement, collectif, éditions La Découverte, 2009
- Dix bonnes raisons d'aimer (ou pas) l'éducation populaire, I love educ pop, under the direction of Damien Cerqueus and Mikaël Garnier-Lavalley, Editions de l'Atelier, 2010
- Kerviel, une affaire d'État : 2 milliards pour la Société en général, préface ny Eva Joly, Arcane 17, 2016
- Désobéissons pour sauver l'Europe, Editions Rue de l'échiquier, 2018
