= Pavel Krisevich =

Russian public figure (born 2000)

- Павел Крисевич
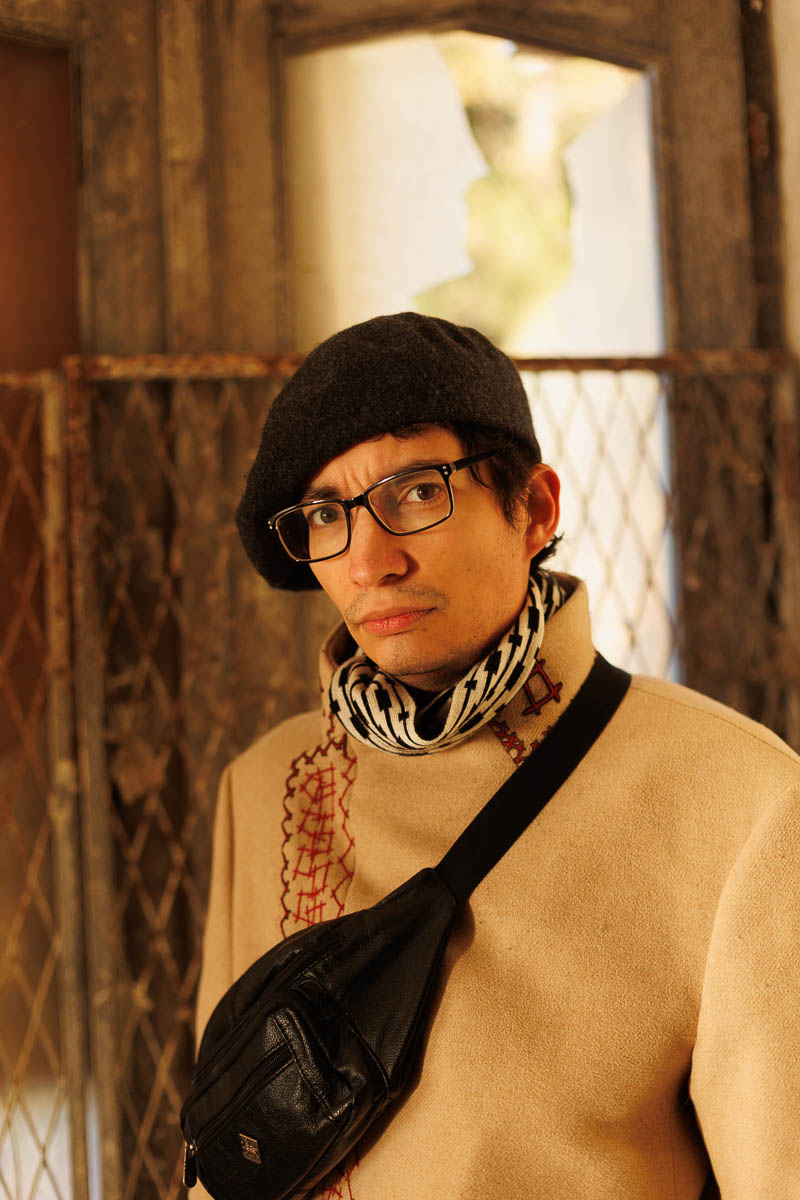
- Krisevich in 2025
- Born: July 7, 2000 (age 26)
- Citizenship: Russia
- Education: Patrice Lumumba Peoples' Friendship University of Russia
- Occupations: Performance artist, activist
- Known for: Support for political prisoners Opposition to the Putin regime

Pavel Krisevich (Russian: Павел Олегович Крисевич; born 7 July 2000) is a Russian public figure known for his political actions and performance art. He was sentenced to five years of imprisonment for staging a suicide on Red Square.

== Biography ==
Biography Pavel Krisevich was born on July 7, 2000. He spent his childhood in the Rzhevka-Porokhovye district in the east of Saint Petersburg. He grew up without a father and was raised by his mother and grandmother. He attended Gymnasium No. 196 in Saint Petersburg. He had an interest in the history of the Russian Revolution, read books by communists, participated in political rallies, and later became interested in the ideas of anarchism. In 2018, he won the finals of the television program Umnitsy i Umniki ("Clever Boys and Girls"), which allowed him to enroll at the Moscow State Institute of International Relations. After the first semester, he left to join the army. After serving a year of conscription, he re-enrolled at the Peoples' Friendship University of Russia and began engaging in political activism.

In June 2020, Krisevich handcuffed himself to a fence near the First Western District Military Court, where the verdict in the Network Case was being announced.

In August 2020, Krisevich suspended himself from a support of the Trinity Bridge in Saint Petersburg and subsequently jumped from the bridge. Near the Lublinsky District Court in Moscow, where the New Greatness Case was being heard, Krisevich "slashed" a mannequin dressed as a police officer, intending to perform a "sacrifice" to the court. Krisevich and other participants in the action were detained.

On November 5, 2020, Krisevich staged a protest outside the FSB building in Moscow. He tied himself to a cross, while assistants wearing raincoats labeled "FSB" set fire to volumes of criminal case files arranged around the cross. Through this action, Krisevich intended to express support for political prisoners. He was detained and sentenced to 15 days of administrative arrest. On November 24, he was expelled from RUDN University. According to Krisevich, the disciplinary commission justified his expulsion by stating that he "does not reflect the image of a student," "insults feelings," and "fights against the government".

In November 2020, near the railway station in Tver, two unidentified individuals demanded that Krisevich apologize for his performance involving the image of Christ. When he refused, they doused him with brilliant green dye (zelyonka).

In January 2021, on the Arbat, Krisevich encased himself in a sphere wrapped in barbed wire. On June 11, 2021, on Red Square, Krisevich shouted, "Shots will follow before the Kremlin curtain," and used a decommissioned Makarov pistol to fire twice into the air and once at his own head, simulating a suicide[3]. According to Krisevich, the performance was intended to support political prisoners and oppose the Russian political regime. Immediately after the action, Krisevich was detained by Federal Protective Service officers guarding the square[11] and charged with hooliganism. In October 2022, the Tverskoy Court of Moscow found Krisevich guilty of hooliganism involving the use of a weapon committed by a group of persons by prior conspiracy (Part 2 of Article 213 of the Criminal Code of the Russian Federation) and sentenced him to five years of imprisonment. He was released in January 2025.

On November 7, 2025, he was designated as a foreign agent by the Ministry of Justice of Russia and added to the corresponding register.
