= Benjamin Griveaux =

French politician (born 1977)

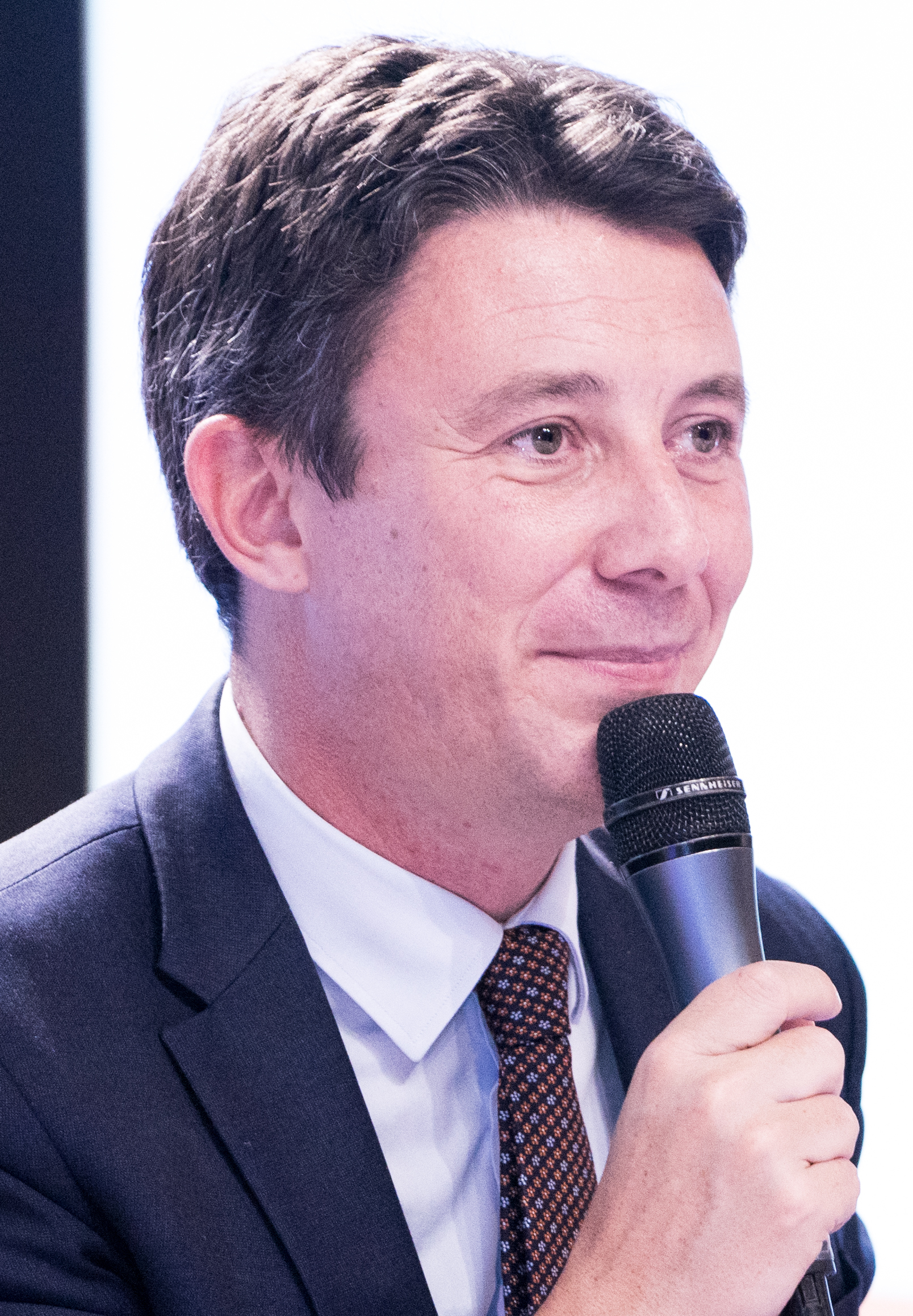
- Griveaux in 2018

Member of the National Assembly for Paris's 5th constituency
- In office 28 April 2019 – 12 May 2021
- Preceded by: Élise Fajgeles
- Succeeded by: Julien Bayou
- In office 21 June 2017 – 21 July 2017
- Preceded by: Seybah Dagoma
- Succeeded by: Élise Fajgeles

Government Spokesman
- In office 24 November 2017 – 27 March 2019
- President: Emmanuel Macron
- Prime Minister: Édouard Philippe
- Preceded by: Christophe Castaner
- Succeeded by: Sibeth Ndiaye

Secretary of State to the Minister of the Economy and Finance
- In office 21 June 2017 – 24 November 2017
- President: Emmanuel Macron
- Prime Minister: Édouard Philippe
- Preceded by: Position reestablished
- Succeeded by: Delphine Gény-Stephann

Personal details
- Born: 29 December 1977 (age 48) Saint-Rémy, France
- Party: Socialist Party; La République En Marche!
- Spouse: Julia Minkowski
- Children: 3
- Education: Sciences Po; HEC Paris

Benjamin-Blaise Griveaux (French pronunciation: [bɛ̃ʒamɛ̃ blɛz ɡʁivo]; born 29 December 1977) is a French politician of La République En Marche! (LREM) who served as Government Spokesman from 2017 to 2019 under Prime Minister Édouard Philippe. From 2017 until 2021, he also served as a member of the National Assembly, representing the 5th constituency of Paris, which encompasses the 3rd and 10th arrondissements.

A former member of the Socialist Party (PS), Griveaux has frequently been described as one of President Emmanuel Macron's closest political allies. He was LREM's candidate for Mayor of Paris in the 2020 municipal election before he withdrew due to a sex scandal and was replaced by Health Minister Agnès Buzyn.

== Early life ==
Griveaux was born in Saint-Rémy. His father is a notary and his mother is a barrister. He studied at Sciences Po, where he was vice-president of the student union and founded a student magazine called L’Autodafé. He graduated in 1999 and continued his studies at HEC Paris, earning a master's degree in 2001. He failed to gain admission to the École nationale d'administration.

== Career ==
=== Early beginnings ===
Between 2003 and 2008 Griveaux began working for A Gauche en Europe, a think-tank founded by Dominique Strauss-Kahn and directed by Michel Rocard. He worked as an adviser to Strauss-Kahn and supported his unsuccessful bid for the leadership of the Socialist Party in 2006. He founded Mediane Conseil, a recruitment consultancy, the same year.

In 2008, Griveaux stood as a Socialist in both the municipal and departmental elections in Chalon-sur-Saône, which took place simultaneously that year. He succeeded in winning a seat as both a municipal councilor for Chalon-sur-Saône and a departmental councilor for Saône-et-Loire. He later became vice-president of the Departmental Council, which was then led by Arnaud Montebourg. In 2012 he worked on François Hollande's campaign for the presidency and after Hollande's election served as an adviser to Health Minister Marisol Touraine.

=== Career in the private sector, 2014–2016 ===
In 2014 Griveaux renounced his mandates in order to take up a post with the commercial real estate company Unibail, prompting criticism from a local official. At Unibail he worked as director of communications and public relations. He left the company in October 2016 to work full-time for En Marche!

=== Career in national politics ===
Griveaux met Emmanuel Macron in December 2015 through their mutual contact with Ismaël Emelien. He was present in the meetings that founded En Marche! and was appointed a spokesperson for the movement. Griveaux has frequently been described in media as one of Macron's closest political allies.

In the 2017 legislative elections Griveaux stood for La République en Marche! in the fifth constituency of Paris, where his opponent was Seybah Dagoma, a Socialist assembly member since 2012. Griveaux won the seat on 18 June with 56.27% of the vote.

On 21 June 2017, Griveaux was appointed to the second Philippe government as a secretary of state at the Finance and Economy Ministry, a newly created role. The Huffington Post reported the extent of Griveaux's remit is unclear, and that he will serve as deputy or assistant (Fr: adjoint) to Finance Minister Bruno Le Maire.Libération referred to Griveaux as ‘the president’s eyes and ears’ in the upper echelons of the powerful Finance Ministry.

=== Candidacy of Mayor of Paris, 2019–2020 ===
In March 2019, Griveaux resigned from the office of spokesman in order to run in the Paris mayor's election.

In February 2020 Griveaux abandoned his bid to become mayor of Paris after it was alleged that he had "exchanged intimate mobile phone messages with a young woman and sent her an explicit video of himself masturbating", which was later posted online by Petr Pavlensky. Pavlensky said that Griveaux was "only the first politician that he would target: he had only just begun".

=== Return to the private sector ===
In May 2021, Griveaux resigned his parliamentary seat and instead announced leaving active politics.

== Controversy ==
In January 2019, Griveaux had to escape his office after protesters broke into the compound and smashed up vehicles during the broader Yellow vests movement.

== Personal life ==
Griveaux is married to Julia Minkowski, a lawyer. They have three children.
