= Isère's 2nd constituency =

Constituency of the National Assembly of France

2nd constituency of Isère
- inline Constituency of the National Assembly of France

- Constituency in Department

- Isère in France
- Deputy: Cyrielle Chatelain; LE
- Department: Isère
- Cantons: Échirolles-Est, Échirolles-Ouest, Eybens, Saint-Martin-d'Hères-Nord, Saint-Martin-d'Hères-Sud, Vizille
- Registered voters: 127,087

The 2nd constituency of Isère is a French legislative constituency in the Isère département.

== Deputies ==
Election	Member	Party
1988	Jean-Pierre Luppi	PS
1993	Gilbert Biessy	PCF
1997	Gilbert Biessy	PCF
2002	Gilbert Biessy	PCF
2007	Michel Issindou	PS
2012	Michel Issindou	PS
2017	Jean-Charles Colas-Roy	REM
2022	Cyrielle Chatelain	EELV
2024	Cyrielle Chatelain	LE

== Election results ==
=== 2024 ===
Candidate	Party	Alliance	First round			Second round		
Candidate	Party	Alliance	Votes	%	+/–	Votes	%	+/–
Cyrielle Chatelain	LE	NFP	22,185	42.17	+8.65	30,855	62.07	+9.94
Edouard Robert	RN		16,043	30.50	+12.42	18,854	37.93	new
Louve Carrière	REN	Ensemble	10,114	19.23	-9.22	withdrew		
Raphaele de Carvalho	LR	UDC	3,064	5.82	+0.98			
Chantal Gomez	LO		661	1.26	+0.37			
Bruno Lafeuille	REC		540	1.03	-3.02			
Votes			52,607	100.00		49,709	100.00	
Valid votes			52,607	97.78	-0.58	49,709	92.77	-1.20
Blank votes			898	1.67	-0.52	3,136	5.85	+1.40
Null votes			295	0.55	+0.06	739	1.38	-0.19
Turnout			53,800	67.92	+21.59	53,584	67.63	+23.50
Abstentions			25,415	32.08	-21.59	25,652	32.37	-23.50
Registered voters			79,215			79,236		
Result			LE HOLD					

=== 2022 ===
Legislative Election 2022: Isère's 2nd constituency
Party	Candidate	Votes	%	±%
EELV (NUPÉS)	Cyrielle Chatelain	12,003	33.52	+1.98
LREM (Ensemble)	Jean-Charles Colas-Roy	10,188	28.45	-11.15
RN	Chloé Bailly	6,474	18.08	+5.49
LR (UDC)	Fabienne Sarrat	1,732	4.84	−3.78
REC	Muriel Burgaz	1,452	4.05	N/A
FGR	Carole Condat	1,387	3.87	N/A
DVE	Grégory Manoukian	869	2.43	N/A
Others	N/A	1,706		
Turnout		35,811	46.33	+0.16
2nd round result
EELV (NUPÉS)	Cyrielle Chatelain	16,992	52.13	N/A
LREM (Ensemble)	Jean-Charles Colas-Roy	15,604	47.87	−25.68
Turnout		32,596	44.13	+5.18
EELV gain from LREM				

=== 2017 ===
Candidate	Label	First round		Second round	
Candidate	Label	Votes	%	Votes	%
Jean-Charles Colas-Roy	REM	13,927	39.60	19,785	73.55
Alexis Jolly	FN	4,426	12.59	7,115	26.45
Taha Bouhafs	FI	3,911	11.12		
David Queiros	PCF	3,675	10.45		
Magalie Vicente	LR	3,031	8.62		
Pierre Verri	PS	2,362	6.72		
Élisabeth Letz	ECO	1,144	3.25		
Bruno Lafeuille	DLF	602	1.71		
Jean-Jacques Tournon	ECO	395	1.12		
Liesse El Habbas	DIV	376	1.07		
Asra Wassfi	DVD	329	0.94		
Chantal Gomez	EXG	325	0.92		
Hervé Perez	DIV	261	0.74		
Philippe Charlot	ECO	201	0.57		
Alexandre Gabriac	EXD	200	0.57		
Votes		35,165	100.00	26,900	100.00
Valid votes		35,165	98.38	26,900	89.21
Blank votes		436	1.22	2,577	8.55
Null votes		143	0.40	678	2.25
Turnout		35,744	46.17	30,155	38.95
Abstentions		41,682	53.83	47,273	61.05
Registered voters		77,426		77,428	
Source: Ministry of the Interior

=== 2012 ===
2012 legislative election in Isere's 2nd constituency
Candidate	Party	First round		Second round	
Candidate	Party	Votes	%	Votes	%
Michel Issindou	PS	16,241	38.40%	24,805	65.35%
Magalie Vicente	UMP	7,938	18.77%	13,154	34.65%
Renzo Sulli	FG	6,930	16.38%		
Marie De Kervereguin	FN	6,828	16.14%		
Maryse Oudjaoudi	EELV	1,680	3.97%		
Xavier Denizot		730	1.73%		
Hervé Nifenecker	MRC	404	0.96%		
Louisa Messous	??	336	0.79%		
Bernard Cancelatta	??	323	0.76%		
Fabien Givernaud		267	0.63%		
Manon Troussier	DR	244	0.58%		
Chantal Gomez	LO	196	0.46%		
Jérôme Boetti	AEI	178	0.42%		
Valid votes		42,295	98.91%	37,959	97.09%
Spoilt and null votes		464	1.09%	1,139	2.91%
Votes cast / turnout		42,759	56.89%	39,098	52.02%
Abstentions		32,396	43.11%	36,056	47.98%
Registered voters		75,155	100.00%	75,154	100.00%

=== 2007 ===
Legislative Election 2007: Isère's 2nd constituency
Party	Candidate	Votes	%	±%
UMP	Christine Savoureux	12,150	28.91	
PS	Michel Issindou	9,526	22.67	
DVG	Renzo Sulli	5,734	13.65	
PCF	René Proby	4,334	10.31	
MoDem	Xavier Denizot	3,545	8.44	
LV	Lionel Coiffard	1,691	4.02	
FN	Isabelle Ove	1,619	3.85	
Far left	Roseline Vachetta	1,005	2.39	
Others	N/A	2,418		
Turnout		42,600	58.32	
2nd round result
PS	Michel Issindou	24,973	60.33	
UMP	Christine Savoureux	16,418	39.67	
Turnout		42,342	57.97	
PS gain from PCF				

=== 2002 ===
Legislative Election 2002: Isère's 2nd constituency
Party	Candidate	Votes	%	±%
PCF	Gilbert Biessy	17,515	41.86	
UMP	Christine Savoureux	11,310	27.03	
FN	Rachel Beaudoin	5,022	12.00	
LV	Lionel Coiffard	2,089	4.99	
DVG	Jean-Pierre Luppi	1,276	3.05	
PR	Veronique Boissy-Maurin	1,034	2.47	
LCR	Yves Delmonte	993	2.37	
Others	N/A	2,602		
Turnout		42,621	64.58	
2nd round result
PCF	Gilbert Biessy	22,064	60.79	
UMP	Christine Savoureux	14,231	39.21	
Turnout		37,528	56.86	
PCF hold				

=== 1997 ===
Legislative Election 1997: Isère's 2nd constituency
Party	Candidate	Votes	%	±%
PCF	Gilbert Biessy	11,314	27.86	
PS	Claudette Chesne*	8,478	20.88	
RPR	Marie-Thérèse Phion	7,264	17.89	
FN	Georges Theil	6,457	15.90	
GE	Jean Viciana	1,737	4.28	
LO	Claude Detroyat	1,496	3.68	
LCR	Yves Delmonte	1,417	3.49	
DIV	Yann Dolias	1,089	2.68	
DVD	Edouard Ytournel	918	2.26	
Others	N/A	442		
Turnout		42,291	65.26	
2nd round result
PCF	Gilbert Biessy	22,415	100.00	
Turnout		33,119	51.10	
PCF hold				

* Withdrew before the 2nd round

== Sources ==
- "Résultats électoraux officiels en France" (in French). 2017.
- "Résultats électoraux officiels en France" (in French). 2012.
- "Résultats électoraux officiels en France" (in French). 2007.
