= Paris's 5th constituency =

Constituency of the National Assembly of France

5th constituency of Paris
- inline Constituency of the National Assembly of France

- Paris, showing its legislative constituency boundaries from 2012
- Deputy: Pouria Amirshahi; EELV
- Department: Paris

The 5th constituency of Paris (French: Cinquième circonscription de Paris) is a French legislative constituency in the department of Paris. Like the other 576 French constituencies, it elects one member of the National Assembly using the two-round system. Its boundaries were heavily redrawn in 1988 and 2012. From 1958 until 1988 it was located on the Rive Gauche; since then it has been located on the Rive Droite. In the 2017 legislative election, Benjamin Griveaux of La République En Marche! (LREM) won a majority of the vote. Upon his appointment to the executive branch in 2017, he left his mandate to his substitute Élise Fajgeles, before regaining it in 2019.

5th constituency of Paris
- inline Constituency of the National Assembly of France

- Paris, showing its legislative constituencies between 1988 and 2012
- Member: constituency abolished, 2012
- Department: Paris

Map of Paris constituencies in 1981.

== Deputies ==
Election	Member	Party
1958	Édouard Frédéric-Dupont	CNIP
1962	Jacques Mer	UNR
1967	Édouard Frédéric-Dupont	CD
1968	Michel Caldaguès	UDR
1973	Édouard Frédéric-Dupont	RI
1978	Édouard Frédéric-Dupont	UDF
1981	Édouard Frédéric-Dupont	RPR
1986	Proportional representation - no election by constituency	
1988	Claude-Gérard Marcus	RPR
1993	Claude-Gérard Marcus	RPR
1997	Tony Dreyfus	PS
2002	Tony Dreyfus	PS
2007	Tony Dreyfus	PS
2012	Seybah Dagoma	PS
2017	Benjamin Griveaux	LREM
2017	Élise Fajgeles	LREM
2019	Benjamin Griveaux	LREM
2022	Julien Bayou	EELV

== Election results ==
=== 2024 ===
Candidate	Party	Alliance	First round			
Candidate	Party	Alliance	Votes	%	+/–	
Pouria Amirshahi	LÉ	NFP	32,152	54.24	+5.36	
Rachel-Flore Pardo	RE	ENS	17,879	30.16	+0.41	
Céline Chen	RN		4,186	7.06	+4.22	
Valentine Serino	LR		2,459	4.15	-0.63	
Thiaba Bruni	DVE		674	1.14	N/A	
Yoneko Kikuchi	REC		534	0.90	-2.48	
Théo Faucon	UDI		511	0.86	-1.95	
Arnaud Borowski	DVE		367	0.62	N/A	
Monique Dabat	LO		271	0.46	-0.11	
Raymond Victor Bassil	DVC		133	0.22	N/A	
Anne Chamayou	Volt		114	0.19	N/A	
Léonard Guiot	EXG		1	0.00	N/A	
Valid votes			59,281	99.02	+0.05	
Blank votes			400	0.67	-0.09	
Null votes			187	0.31	+0.04	
Turnout			59,868	75.35	+18.18	
Abstentions			19,583	24.65	-18.18	
Registered voters			79,451			
Source: Ministry of the Interior, Le Monde
Result						LÉ HOLD

=== 2022 ===
Legislative Election 2022: Paris's 5th constituency
Party	Candidate	Votes	%	±%
EELV (NUPÉS)	Julien Bayou	21,942	48.88	+12.18
LREM (Ensemble)	Élise Fajgeles	13,358	29.75	-13.88
DVD	Pierre Maurin	2,147	4.78	N/A
REC	Yann Gautier	1,519	3.38	N/A
PRG	Assia Meddah	1,443	3.21	N/A
RN	Marguerite Vogt	1,277	2.84	+0.03
UDI (UDC)	Annaëlle Gille	1,262	2.81	N/A
Others	N/A	1,946		
Turnout		45,361	57.17	−1.51
2nd round result
EELV (NUPÉS)	Julien Bayou	24,857	58.05	+14.31
LREM (Ensemble)	Élise Fajgeles	17,960	41.95	−14.31
Turnout		42,817	55.76	+7.48
EELV gain from LREM				

=== 2017 ===
2017 legislative election: Paris's 5th constituency
Party	Candidate	Votes	%	±%
LREM	Benjamin Griveaux	19,247	43.63	N/A
PS	Seybah Dagoma	5,503	12.47	−31.13
EELV	Julien Bayou	5,454	12.36	+3.76
LFI	Layla Yakoub	5,237	11.87	N/A
LR	Déborah Pawlik	3,511	7.96	−13.34
FN	Marie Fontaine	1,240	2.81	−1.99
Others	N/A	3,923		
Turnout		44,531	58.68	−1.41
2nd round result
LREM	Benjamin Griveaux	19,212	56.27	N/A
PS	Seybah Dagoma	14,930	43.75	−26.35
Turnout		36,639	48.28	−8.56
LREM gain from PS		Swing		

=== 2012 ===
2012 legislative election in Paris's 5th constituency
Candidate	Party	First round		Second round	
Candidate	Party	Votes	%	Votes	%
Seybah Dagoma	PS	18,433	43.60%	27,385	70.10%
Benjamin Lancar	UMP	9,007	21.30%	11,681	29.90%
Martine Billard	FG	5,499	13.01%		
Anne Souyris	EELV	3,636	8.60%		
Loris Pruvot	MoDem–NC	2,056	4.86%		
Jean-Baptiste Marly	FN	2,029	4.80%		
Olga Johnson	PR–LGM–CD	292	0.69%		
Thomas Samain	Cap21	286	0.68%		
Mickaël Ferraz	DVD	214	0.51%		
Isabelle Foucher	NPA	200	0.47%		
Serge Federbusch	DVD (PDL)	197	0.47%		
Gaspard Delanoë	PFT	180	0.43%		
Monique Dabat	LO	145	0.34%		
Abel Boyi-Banga	PCD	90	0.21%		
Jeannine Sisti	DVG	13	0.03%		
Valid votes		42,277	99.21%	39,066	96.92%
Spoilt and null votes		337	0.79%	1,042	2.59%
Votes cast / turnout		42,614	60.09%	40,308	56.84%
Abstentions		28,304	39.91%	30,606	43.16%
Registered voters		70,918	100.00%	70,914	100.00%

=== 2007 ===
Elections between 1988 and 2007 were based on the 1988 boundaries.

Map of Paris Constituencies, 1988-2007 elections

2007 legislative election: Paris's 5th constituency
Party	Candidate	Votes	%	±%
PS	Tony Dreyfus	10,865	36.31	
UMP	Lynda Asmani	8,667	28.97	
MoDem	Sophie Dion	3,593	12.01	
LV	Véronique Dubarry	2,304	7.70	
PCF	Sylvie Scherer	1,314	4.39	
Far left	Dominique Angelini	1,032	3.45	
FN	Marie-Claire de la Sayette	759	2.54	
Others	N/A	1,387		
Turnout		30,200	60.67	
2nd round result
PS	Tony Dreyfus	17,391	63.19	
UMP	Lynda Asmani	10,132	36.81	
Turnout		28,275	56.82	
PS hold				

=== 2002 ===
2002 legislative election: Paris's 5th constituency
Party	Candidate	Votes	%	±%
PS	Tony Dreyfus	10,357	37.10	
UMP	Cécile Renson	6,559	23.50	
LV	Bernard Maris	2,994	10.73	
UDF	René Le Goff	2,530	9.06	
FN	Claude Raud	1,697	6.08	
PCF	Sylvie Scherer	1,000	3.58	
Others	N/A	2,778		
Turnout		28,223	68.80	
2nd round result
PS	Tony Dreyfus	15,166	59.83	
UMP	Cécile Renson	10,182	40.17	
Turnout		26,121	63.69	
PS hold				

=== 1997 ===
1997 legislative election: Paris's 5th constituency
Party	Candidate	Votes	%	±%
RPR	Claude-Gérard Marcus	7,534	31.07	
PS	Tony Dreyfus	7,197	29.68	
FN	Françoise Monestier	2,822	11.64	
PCF	Dominique Léonard	1,610	6.64	
LV	Véronique Dubarry	1,308	5.39	
LO	Chantal Cauquil	743	3.06	
Far left	Sylvie Scherer	518	2.14	
Others	N/A	2,518		
Turnout		24,917	61.38	
2nd round result
PS	Tony Dreyfus	13,767	53.55	
RPR	Claude-Gérard Marcus	11,942	46.45	
Turnout		26,794	66.00	
PS gain from RPR				
