= Results of the 2024 French legislative election in Somme =

Following the first round of the 2024 French legislative election on 30 June 2024, runoff elections in each constituency where no candidate received a vote share greater than 50 percent were scheduled for 7 July. Candidates permitted to stand in the runoff elections needed to either come in first or second place in the first round or achieve more than 12.5 percent of the votes of the entire electorate (as opposed to 12.5 percent of the vote share due to low turnout).

== Somme ==
=== 1st constituency ===
Candidate	Party or alliance		First round		Second round	
Candidate	Party or alliance		Votes	%	Votes	%
Nathalie Ribeiro-Billet	National Rally		21,413	40.69	24,083	47.05
François Ruffin	New Popular Front	Picardie Debout	17,850	33.92	27,108	52.95
Albane Branlant	Ensemble	Renaissance	11,933	22.68		
Bruno Dumont	Miscellaneous centre	Independent	776	1.47		
Jean-Patrick Baudry	Far-left	Lutte Ouvrière	653	1.24		
Total			52,625	100.00	51,191	100.00
Valid votes			52,625	97.44	51,191	93.64
Invalid votes			459	0.85	900	1.65
Blank votes			926	1.71	2,576	4.71
Total votes			54,010	100.00	54,667	100.00
Registered voters/turnout			83,104	64.99	83,104	65.78

=== 2nd constituency ===
Candidate	Party or alliance		First round		Second round	
Candidate	Party or alliance		Votes	%	Votes	%
Zahia Hamdane	New Popular Front	La France Insoumise	15,217	29.54	18,538	35.76
Damien Toumi	National Rally		14,142	27.46	16,145	31.15
Hubert De Jenlis	Ensemble	Renaissance	12,997	25.23	17,153	33.09
Anne Pinon	The Republicans		3,450	6.70		
Renaud Deschamps	Miscellaneous centre	Independent	2,029	3.94		
Ingrid Dordain	Miscellaneous centre	En Commun (Note: Dissident who ran without the support of Ensemble)	1,589	3.09		
Paul-Éric Decle	Miscellaneous centre	Miscellaneous right	1,096	2.13		
Rémy Chassoulier	Far-left	Lutte Ouvrière	531	1.03		
Suzanne Plaquet	Reconquête		410	0.80		
Grégoire Lecocq	Sovereigntist right		44	0.09		
Total			51,505	100.00	51,836	100.00
Valid votes			51,505	97.99	51,836	97.34
Invalid votes			301	0.57	343	0.64
Blank votes			756	1.44	1,072	2.01
Total votes			52,562	100.00	53,251	100.00
Registered voters/turnout			77,341	67.96	77,350	68.84

=== 3rd constituency ===
Candidate	Party or alliance		First round		Second round	
Candidate	Party or alliance		Votes	%	Votes	%
Matthias Renault	National Rally		27,277	48.90	29,876	54.07
Emmanuel Maquet	The Republicans		15,449	27.70	25,383	45.93
Léon Deffontaines	New Popular Front	Communist Party	8,385	15.03		
Bruno Mariage	Ensemble	Horizons	3,490	6.26		
Michel Valet	Far-left	Lutte Ouvrière	589	1.06		
Sylvie Bruhat	Reconquête		370	0.66		
Noë Boxoën	Sovereigntist right	Independent	217	0.39		
Total			55,777	100.00	55,259	100.00
Valid votes			55,777	97.08	55,259	95.51
Invalid votes			549	0.96	734	1.27
Blank votes			1,128	1.96	1,864	3.22
Total votes			57,454	100.00	57,857	100.00
Registered voters/turnout			82,023	70.05	82,023	70.54

=== 4th constituency ===
Candidate	Party or alliance		First round		Second round	
Candidate	Party or alliance		Votes	%	Votes	%
Jean-Philippe Tanguy	National Rally		28,559	49.62	31,468	57.48
Anthony Gest	Ensemble	Renaissance	10,631	18.47	23,276	42.52
Elodie Héren	New Popular Front	The Ecologists	9,789	17.01		
Vincent Jacques	The Republicans		7,759	13.48		
Guy Vitoux	Far-left	Lutte Ouvrière	820	1.42		
Total			57,558	100.00	54,744	100.00
Valid votes			57,558	97.26	54,744	93.86
Invalid votes			446	0.75	832	1.43
Blank votes			1,178	1.99	2,751	4.72
Total votes			59,182	100.00	58,327	100.00
Registered voters/turnout			85,080	69.56	85,101	68.54

=== 5th constituency ===
Candidate	Party or alliance		Votes	%
Yaël Ménache	National Rally		29,281	55.98
Loïc Folléat	Ensemble	Renaissance	10,196	19.49
Alice Berger	New Popular Front	La France Insoumise	6,877	13.15
Séverine Mordacq	The Republicans		4,280	8.18
Hélène Launay	Far-left	Lutte Ouvrière	1,000	1.91
Béatrice Guilbert	Reconquête		672	1.28
Total			52,306	100.00
Valid votes			52,306	96.97
Invalid votes			495	0.92
Blank votes			1,137	2.11
Total votes			53,938	100.00
Registered voters/turnout			81,191	66.43
