= Vincent Peillon =

French politician (born 1960)

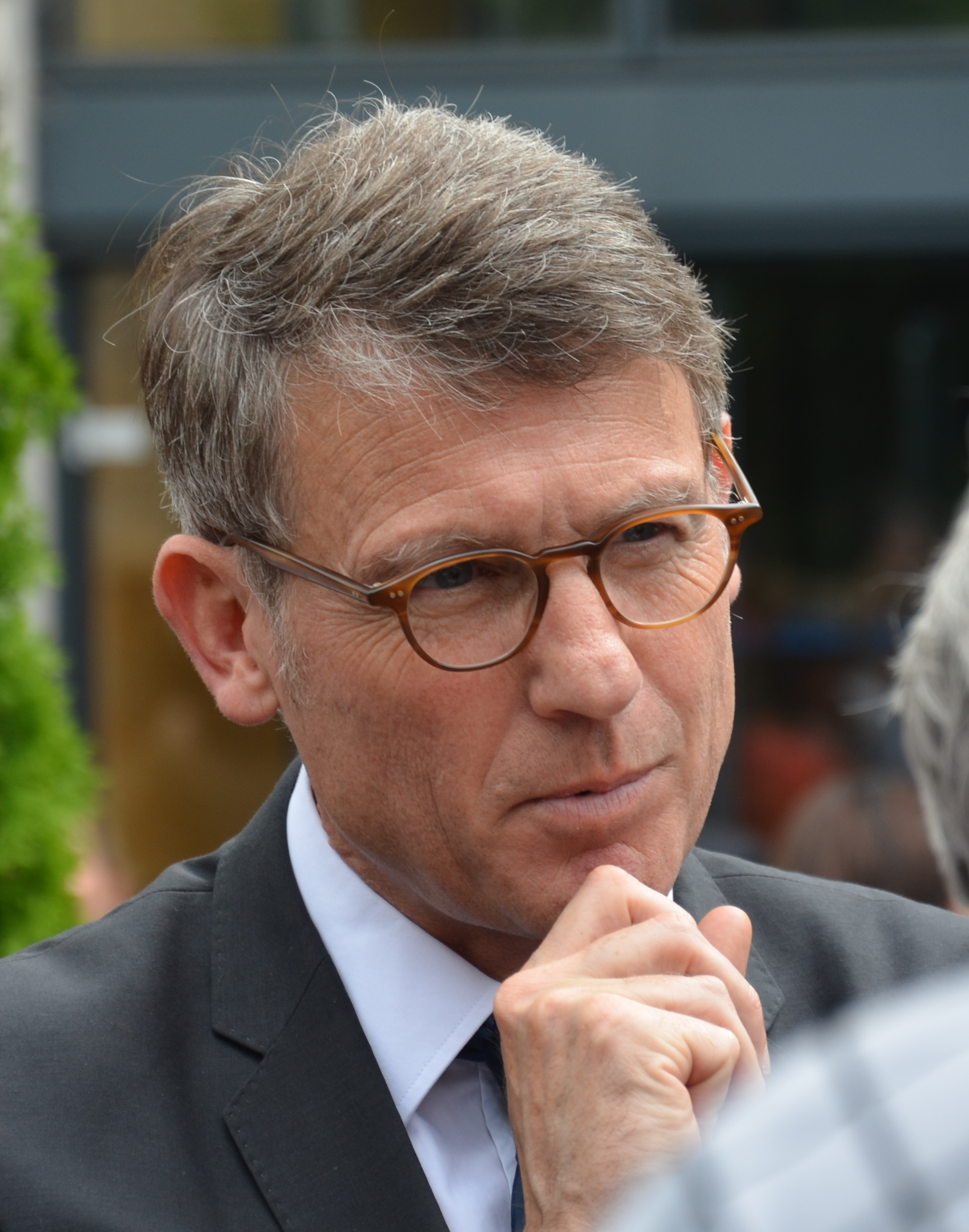
- Peillon in 2012

Minister of National Education
- In office 10 May 2012 – 2 April 2014
- Prime Minister: Jean-Marc Ayrault
- Preceded by: Luc Chatel
- Succeeded by: Benoît Hamon

Member of the European Parliament
- In office 3 May 2014 – 1 July 2019
- Constituency: South-East France
- In office 20 July 2004 – 15 May 2012
- Constituency: North-West France (2004–2009); South-East France (2009–2012)

Member of the National Assembly for Somme's 3rd constituency
- In office 12 June 1997 – 18 June 2002
- Preceded by: Jérôme Bignon
- Succeeded by: Jérôme Bignon

Personal details
- Born: Vincent Benoît Camille Peillon; 7 July 1960 (age 66) Suresnes, France
- Party: Socialist Party
- Education: Panthéon-Sorbonne University
- Occupation: Teacher

Vincent Benoît Camille Peillon (French pronunciation: [vɛ̃sɑ̃ pɛjɔ̃]; born 7 July 1960) is a French teacher and politician who served as Minister of National Education under Prime Minister Jean-Marc Ayrault from 2012 to 2014. A member of the Socialist Party (PS), he also served as a Member of the European Parliament (MEP) from 2004 to 2012 and again from 2014 until 2019.

== Early life and education ==
After a degree in Philosophy at Panthéon-Sorbonne University (class of 1980), Peillon became a high school teacher (junior teaching qualification in 1984 and senior teaching qualification in 1986). He remained a teacher until 1992. He worked one year at Henri Emmanuelli staff at the National Assembly and resumed his teaching between 1993 and 1997. Peillon completed graduate studies at Panthéon-Sorbonne University, graduating with a PhD in Philosophy in 1992. He was Senior Research Fellow at the Centre national de la recherche scientifique between 2002 and 2004, working on ante-Marxist socialism.

== Political career ==
=== Early career ===
- Secretary of the Socialist Party's group of experts (1993–94)
- Seconded to the First Secretary of the Socialist Party (1995–97)
- National research secretary of the Socialist Party (1997–2000)
- Member of the Socialist Party national bureau (since 1994)

=== Member of the National Assembly, 1997–2002 ===
Peillon served as a Member of the National Assembly from 1997 until 2002. During his time in office, he was the chairman of the National Assembly's inquiry into money laundering (1999–2002). He also served as the Socialist Party's national spokesman (2000–02).

In a 2000 report co-authored with Arnaud Montebourg, Peillon alleged that Monaco had lax policies with respect to money laundering, including within its famed casino, and that the government of Monaco had been placing political pressure on the judiciary, so that alleged crimes were not properly investigated. In a move to counter efforts by former Socialist Finance Ministers Laurent Fabius and Dominique Strauss-Kahn to recast the Socialist Party as centrist and market-friendly, Peillon joined Montebourg and Julien Dray in 2002 in writing an article for the newspaper Libération, saying the Socialists faced a "crisis of confidence" under its chairman François Hollande. In a clear challenge to the party's free-market wing, the three called on Socialists to "fight more effectively and resolutely against the ferocity of the new capitalism and the excesses of deregulation."

In 2007, Peillon joined Ségolène Royal's campaign team as a spokesperson, alongside Najat Vallaud-Belkacem and Montebourg.

=== Minister of Education, 2012–2014 ===
After the election of François Hollande, Vincent Peillon was appointed Minister of Education on May 16, 2012. The day after his nomination, he announced the end of the four-day week in primary education (introduced in 2008) for September 2013, and then the return to a five-day week. He also promised to recruit 40 000 new teachers in 2013.

Ahead of the Socialist Party's 2012 convention in Toulouse, Peillon publicly endorsed Harlem Désir as candidate to succeed Martine Aubry at the party's leadership.

Amid his government's plans for a legalisation of same-sex marriage in 2013, Peillon caused a national debate when he called on Catholic schools, which teach about one-fifth of all pupils in France, to stay neutral in the debate.

=== Member of the European Parliament, 2014–2019 ===
Peillon was again elected as Member of the European Parliament in the 2014 elections; he and his Socialist colleagues gathered 14% of the votes. He joined the Committee on Foreign Affairs. In addition to his committee assignments, he was a member of the parliament’s delegations for relations with the Maghreb countries and the Arab Maghreb Union as well as to the Parliamentary Assembly of the Mediterranean.

In the Socialist Party's primaries, Peillon ran to become the party's candidate in the 2017 French presidential election; he eventually lost against Benoît Hamon.

== Honours ==
- Knight of the Legion of Honour (2023)

== See also ==
- Clearstream scandal (with Arnaud Montebourg, he published a parliamentary report on the underground economy in Luxembourg, of which a whole chapter was dedicated to Clearstream)

Political offices
Preceded by Luc Chatel	Minister of National Education; 2012–2014	Succeeded by Benoît Hamon
