= Delpirou =

Delpirou is a French surname. Notable people with the surname include:

- Cécile Delpirou (born 1964), French politician
- Marthe Delpirou (1900–1945), French lawyer and resistance fighter

== See also ==
- Delairea
