= Stéphane Demilly =

French politician (born 1963)

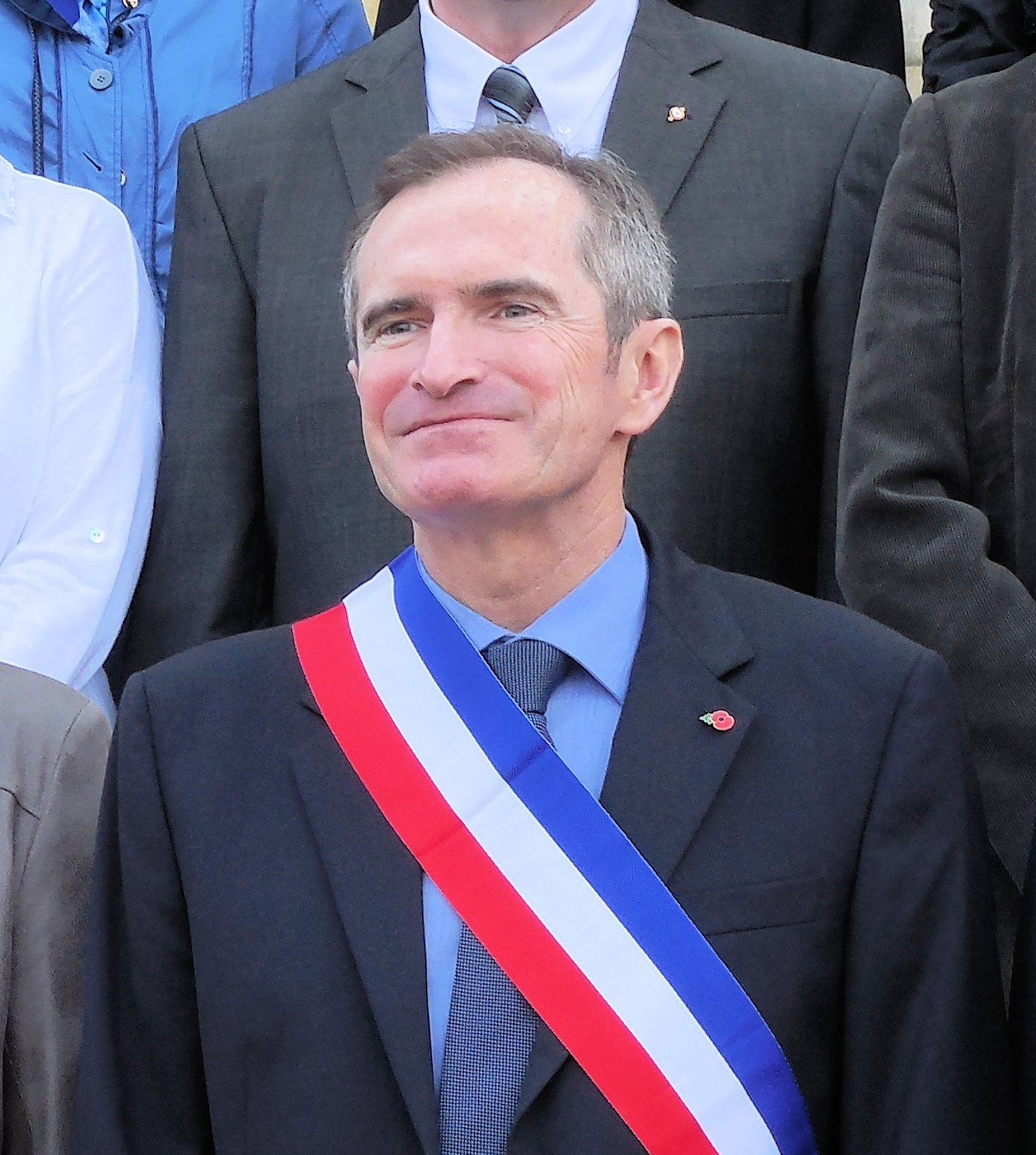
- Demilly in 2014

Senator for Somme
- Incumbent
- Assumed office 1 October 2020

Member of the National Assembly for Somme's 5th constituency
- In office 16 June 2002 – 30 September 2020
- Preceded by: Gautier Audinot
- Succeeded by: Grégory Labille

Mayor of Albert
- In office 20 March 1989 – 30 June 2017
- Preceded by: Claude Landas
- Succeeded by: Claude Cliquet

Personal details
- Born: 26 June 1963 (age 63) Albert, Somme, France
- Party: Union for French Democracy (until 2007); New Centre (2007–2012); Union of Democrats and Independents (2012–present)
- Parent: Fernand Demilly (father)

Stéphane Demilly (French pronunciation: [stefan dəmiji]; born 26 June 1963) is a French politician who has served as a Senator for Somme since 2020. A member of the Union of Democrats and Independents (UDI), he previously represented Somme's 5th constituency in the National Assembly from 2002 until his resignation in 2020 following his election to the Senate, where he sits with the Centrist Union group.

== Career ==
Prior to his election to Parliament, Demilly served as Mayor of Albert (1989–2017) and a member of the Regional Council of Picardy (1993–2002).

Demilly represented Somme's 5th constituency in the National Assembly from 2002 until 2020. In the National Assembly, Demilly served on the Economic Affairs Committee (2002–2007), the Defence Committee (2007–2009, 2017–2018) and the Sustainable Development and Spatial Planning Committee (2009–2020). In addition to his committee assignments, he was a member of the French delegation to the Parliamentary Assembly of the Organization for Security and Co-operation in Europe (OSCE) from 2007 until 2020.

From 27 June to 28 November 2017, Demilly co-chaired the UDI and Independents group in the National Assembly, alongside Franck Riester.

Demilly resigned from the National Assembly in September 2020 following his election to the Senate, where he sits on the Spatial Planning and Sustainable Development Committee. He also returned as a member of the French delegation to the OSCE Parliamentary Assembly.

== Personal life ==
His father Fernand Demilly served before him as Mayor of Albert (1971–1977) and a Senator for Somme (1995–2004).
