= Grégory Labille =

French politician

Member of the National Assembly for Somme's 5th constituency
- In office 8 October 2020 – 21 June 2022
- Preceded by: Stéphane Demilly
- Succeeded by: Yaël Ménache

Personal details
- Born: 10 July 1968 (age 57) Tourcoing, France
- Party: Union of Democrats and Independents

Grégory Labille (born 10 July 1968) is a French politician from the Union of Democrats and Independents.

== Political career ==
In the 2017 French legislative election, Labille was a substitute.

He was co-opted as Member of Parliament for Somme's 5th constituency when incumbent MP Stéphane Demilly was elected to the French Senate in the 2020 French Senate election.

He lost his seat in the first round of the 2022 French legislative election.
