= Olivier Jardé =

French politician (born 1953)

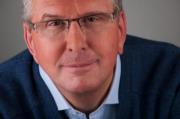
- Olivier Jardé

Member of the French National Assembly for Somme's 2nd constituency
- In office 18 July 2002 – 19 June 2012
- Preceded by: Gilles de Robien
- Succeeded by: Barbara Pompili

Personal details
- Born: 28 March 1953 (age 73) Courbevoie, France
- Party: The Centrists
- Occupation: Orthopedic surgeon

Olivier Jardé (born 28 March 1953 in Courbevoie, Hauts-de-Seine) is a French politician who was a member of the National Assembly of France. He represented the Somme department as Vice-President, and is a member of the Centrists. Olivier Jardé is married and has three daughters.

== Career ==
Jardé studied at Université de Picardie Jules Verne in Amiens, France.

He is a University Professor and Orthopedic Trauma Surgeon at the University Hospital of Amiens. He is also an associate professor of health law and was appointed expert for the Court of Appeal and the Court of Cassation.

Jardé first entered politics in 1989 as mayor of Remiencourt, a small town near Amiens with 170 inhabitants. His first mandate at the Departmental Council of the Somme dates from 1994.

In 1997, the Deputy Mayor of Amiens Gilles de Robien asked Jardé to be his deputy in the legislative elections. He then replaced Gilles de Robien in the National Assembly during his ministerial career when he was Minister of Transport, Tourism and the Sea, then Minister of National Education. In 2007, Gilles de Robien did not run for election and so Jardé proposed his own candidacy and was elected. He was beaten in the elections of June 2012 but has remained departmental councillor.
