= Somme's 2nd constituency =

Constituency of the National Assembly of France

2nd constituency of Somme
- inline Constituency of the National Assembly of France

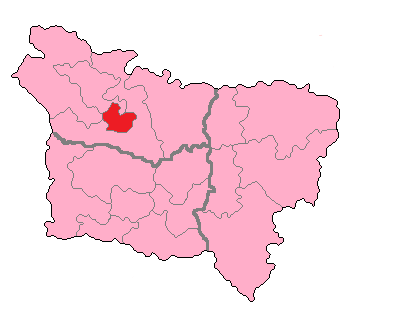
- The constituency shown within Picardie
- Incumbent deputy: Zahia Hamdane; LFI
- Department: Somme
- Cantons: Amiens-I-Ouest, Amiens-III-Nord-Est, Amiens-V-Sud-Est, Amiens-VI-Sud, Amiens-VII-Sud-Ouest, Boves
- Registered voters: 75,487 (2017)

The 2nd constituency of Somme (French: Deuxième circonscription de la Somme) is one of five electoral districts in the department of the same name, each of which returns one deputy to the French National Assembly in elections using the two-round system, with a run-off if no candidate receives more than 50% of the vote in the first round.

== Description ==
The constituency is made up of the six cantons of Amiens-I-Ouest, Amiens-III-Nord-Est, Amiens-V-Sud-Est, Amiens-VI-Sud, Amiens-VII-Sud-Ouest, and Boves.

At the time of the 1999 census (which was the basis for the most recent redrawing of constituency boundaries, carried out in 2010) the 2nd constituency had a total population of 99,427.

It contains most of the city of Amiens, plus the village of Boves to its south-east, separated from the city by the Étang Saint-Ladre nature reserve.

Politically the seat has historically favoured the right. Its only left-wing deputy before 2012 had been Jacques Fleury of the PS.

== Historic representation ==
Election	Member	Party
1958	Jean Doublet	CNIP
1962	Léon Heitz	UNR
1967	Jean-Louis Massoubre	UDR
1968	Jean-Louis Massoubre	UDR
1973	Jean-Louis Massoubre	UDR
1978	Jean-Louis Massoubre	RPR
1981	Jacques Fleury	PS
1986	Proportional representation – no election by constituency	
1988	Gilles de Robien	UDF
1993	Gilles de Robien	UDF
1997	Gilles de Robien	UDF
2002	Gilles de Robien	UDF
2002	Olivier Jardé	UDF
2007	Olivier Jardé	NC
2012	Barbara Pompili	EELV
2017	Barbara Pompili	LREM
2020	Cécile Delpirou	LREM
2022	Barbara Pompili	RE
2023	Ingrid Dordain	RE
2024	Zahia Hamdane	LFI

== Election results ==
=== 2024 ===
Candidate	Party	Alliance	First round			Second round		
Candidate	Party	Alliance	Votes	%	+/–	Votes	%	+/–
Zahia Hamdane	LFI	NFP	15,217	29.54	-0.44	18,538	35.76	-11.11
Damien Toumi	RN		14,142	27.46	+11.63	16,145	31.15	new
Hubert De Jenlis	RE	Ensemble	12,997	25.23	-4.61	17,153	33.09	-20.04
Anne Pinon	LR	UDC	3,450	6.70	-2.11			
Renaud Deschamps	DVC		2,029	3.94	new			
Ingrid Dordain	DVC		1,589	3.09	new			
Paul-Éric Decle	DVC		1,096	2.13	new			
Rémy Chassoulier	LO		531	1.03	-0.19			
Suzanne Plaquet	REC		410	0.80	-2.86			
Grégoire Lecocq	DSV		44	0.09	new			
Votes			51,505	100.00		51,836	100.00	
Valid votes			51,505	97.99	-0.08	51,836	97.34	+4.99
Blank votes			756	1.44	-0.12	1,072	2.01	-3.44
Null votes			301	0.57	+0.04	343	0.64	-1.57
Turnout			52,562	67.96	+20.15	53,251	68.84	+21.37
Abstentions			24,779	32.04	-20.15	24,099	31.16	-21.37
Registered voters			77,341			77,350		
Result			LFI GAIN FROM RE					

=== 2022 ===
Legislative Election 2022: Somme's 2nd constituency
Party	Candidate	Votes	%	±%
LFI (NUPÉS)	Zahia Hamdane	10,946	29.98	+9.93
LREM (Ensemble)	Barbara Pompili	10,895	29.84	-10.86
RN	Nadia Hermans	5,780	15.83	+4.83
UDI (UDC)	Valérie Devaux	3,217	8.81	−1.30
DVD	Aurélien Caron	2,278	6.24	N/A
REC	Aurélie Soyer	1,337	3.66	N/A
PA	Sandrine L'Aminot	782	2.14	N/A
Others	N/A	1,272	-	−
Turnout		36,507	47.81	−0.90
2nd round result
LREM (Ensemble)	Barbara Pompili	18,162	53.13	-8.76
LFI (NUPÉS)	Zahia Hamdane	16,025	46.87	+8.76
Turnout		34,187	47.47	+9.05
LREM hold				

=== 2017 ===
Legislative Election 2017: Somme's 2nd constituency
Party	Candidate	Votes	%	±%
LREM	Barbara Pompili	14,970	40.70	
LFI	Cédric Maisse	5,269	14.33	
DVD	Olivier Jardé	4,579	12.45	
FN	Nicolas Versaen	4,044	11.00	
UDI	Hubert De Jenlis	3,719	10.11	
PS	Philippe Casier	2,102	5.72	
EELV	Christian Galli	786	2.14	
Others	N/A	1,311		
Turnout		36,780	48.71	
2nd round result
LREM	Barbara Pompili	17,948	61.89	
LFI	Cédric Maisse	11,053	38.11	
Turnout		29,001	38.42	
LREM gain from EELV		Swing		

=== 2012 ===
Legislative Election 2012: Somme's 2nd constituency
Party	Candidate	Votes	%	±%
NM	Olivier Jardé	14,973	35.49	
EELV	Barbara Pompili	14,365	34.05	
FN	Valéry Druel	5,838	13.84	
FG	Marianne Mugnier	3,490	8.27	
MoDem	Olivier Bouzy	1,206	2.86	
DVG	Jacques Goffinon	994	2.36	
Others	N/A	1,322		
Turnout		42,188	56.23	
2nd round result
EELV	Barbara Pompili	21,044	50.83	
NM	Olivier Jardé	20,356	49.17	
Turnout		41,400	55.18	
EELV gain from NM				

=== 2007 ===
Legislative Election 2007: Somme's 2nd constituency
Party	Candidate	Votes	%	±%
NM	Olivier Jardé	16,828	45.72	
PS	Sarah Thuilliez	9,646	26.21	
MoDem	André Chevance	2,083	5.66	
FN	Catherine Chatelain	1,833	4.98	
LV	Christophe Porquier	1,610	4.37	
DVG	Patrick Le Scouezec	978	2.66	
Far left	Edouard Krysztoforski	886	2.41	
Others	N/A	2,943		
Turnout		37,560	58.23	
2nd round result
NM	Olivier Jardé	19,181	52.82	
PS	Sarah Thuilliez	17,131	47.18	
Turnout		37,361	57.92	
NM gain from UDF				

=== 2002 ===
Legislative Election 2002: Somme's 2nd constituency
Party	Candidate	Votes	%	±%
UDF	Gilles de Robien	19,766	50.25	
PS	Lise Rochowiak-Moreau	8,653	22.00	
FN	Lionel Payet	4,104	10.43	
PCF	Fabienne Debeauvais	1,760	4.47	
LV	Maud Menager-Lemaire	1,411	3.59	
CPNT	Nathalie Huiart	974	2.48	
Others	N/A	2,669		
Turnout		39,956	64.57	
UDF hold				

=== 1997 ===
Legislative Election 1997: Somme's 2nd constituency
Party	Candidate	Votes	%	±%
UDF	Gilles de Robien	16,876	41.43	
PS	Lise Rochowiak-Moreau	8,527	20.93	
FN	Lionel Payet	5,915	14.52	
PCF	Danielle Sinoquet	4,109	10.09	
LV	Christophe Porquier	1,352	3.32	
LO	Bernard Combes	1,272	3.12	
DVD	Anne Deraeve	847	2.08	
Others	N/A	1,834		
Turnout		42,380	69.59	
2nd round result
UDF	Gilles de Robien	23,138	55.01	
PS	Lise Rochowiak-Moreau	18,925	44.99	
Turnout		44,311	72.77	
UDF hold				

== Sources ==
Official results of French elections from 2002: "Résultats électoraux officiels en France" (in French).
