= Somme's 3rd constituency =

Constituency of the National Assembly of France

3rd constituency of Somme
- inline Constituency of the National Assembly of France

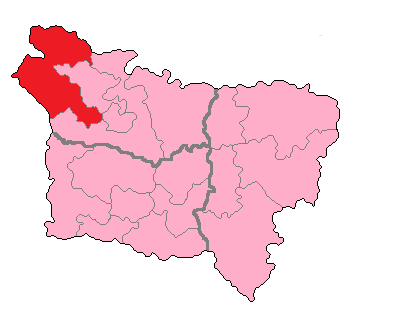
- Somme's 3rd Constituency shown within Picardie
- Deputy: Matthias Renault; RN
- Department: Somme
- Cantons: Ault, Crécy-en-Ponthieu, Friville-Escarbotin, Gamaches, Hallencourt, Molliens-Dreuil, Moyenneville, Nouvion, Oisemont, Rue, Saint-Valery-sur-Somme
- Registered voters: 84,660

The 3rd constituency of Somme is a French legislative constituency in the Somme département. Like the other 576 French constituencies, it elects one MP using the two-round system, with a run-off if no candidate receives over 50% of the vote in the first round.

== Description ==
The 3rd constituency of the Somme stretches along the entire length of the department's coast as well as reaching into its centre close to Amiens.

The seat is extremely marginal and has swung between left and right throughout the Fifth Republic.

== Historic Representation ==
Election	Member	Party
1958	Marcelle Delabie	PR
1962	Michel Couillet	PCF
1967	Michel Couillet	PCF
1968	Charles Bignon	UDR
1973	Charles Bignon	UDR
1978	Michel Couillet	PCF
1981	Michel Couillet	PCF
1986	Proportional representation – no election by constituency	
1988	Pierre Hiard	PS
1993	Jérôme Bignon	RPR
1997	Vincent Peillon	PS
2002	Jérôme Bignon	UMP
2007	Jérôme Bignon	UMP
2012	Jean-Claude Buisine	PS
2017	Emmanuel Maquet	LR
2022	Emmanuel Maquet	LR
2024	Matthias Renault	RN

== Election results ==
=== 2024 ===
Legislative Election 2024: Somme's 3rd constituency
Party	Candidate	Votes	%	±%
HOR (Ensemble)	Bruno Mariage	3,490	6.26	N/A
LO	Michel Valet	589	1.06	N/A
REC	Sylvie Bruhat	370	0.66	−1.96
LR	Emmanuel Maquet	15,449	27.70	+1.13
PCF (NFP)	Léon Deffontaines	8,385	15.03	−1.68
DIV	Noë Boxoën	217	0.39	N/A
RN	Matthias Renault	27,277	48.90	+17.96
Turnout		55,777	97.08	+44.41
Registered electors		82,023		
2nd round result
RN	Matthias Renault	29,876	54.07	+7.88
LR	Emmanuel Maquet	25,383	45.93	−7.88
Turnout		55,259	95.51	+43.95
Registered electors		82,023		
RN gain from LR				

=== 2022 ===
Legislative Election 2022: Somme's 3rd constituency
Party	Candidate	Votes	%	±%
RN	Nicolas Lottin	13,091	30.94	+8.36
LR (UDC)	Emmanuel Maquet	11,240	26.57	+4.64
LREM (Ensemble)	Albane Branlant	7,490	17.70	−8.39
PCF (NUPÉS)	Arnaud Petit	7,058	16.68	−7.37
REC	François Miramont	1,110	2.62	N/A
Others	N/A	2,321	-	−
Turnout		42,310	52.67	−1.98
2nd round result
LR (UDC)	Emmanuel Maquet	21,266	53.81	-6.33
RN	Nicolas Lottin	18,251	46.19	N/A
Turnout		39,517	51.56	+4.00
LR hold				

=== 2017 ===
Legislative Election 2017: Somme's 3rd constituency
Party	Candidate	Votes	%	±%
LREM	Bruno Mariage	11,552	26.09	'"`UNIQ−−templatestyles−00000018−QINU`"'N/A
LR	Emmanuel Maquet	9,711	21.93	–9.01
FN	Patricia Chagnon	9,592	21.66	+3.29
LFI	Isabelle Brusadelli-Dorion	5,349	12.08	'"`UNIQ−−templatestyles−00000019−QINU`"'N/A
PS	Jean-Claude Buisine	2,658	6.00	–25.14
PCF	Arnaud Petit	2,642	5.97	'"`UNIQ−−templatestyles−0000001A−QINU`"'N/A
DLF	Nicolas Lottin	1,228	2.77	'"`UNIQ−−templatestyles−0000001B−QINU`"'N/A
Party of France	Anne Lengelé	677	1.53	'"`UNIQ−−templatestyles−0000001C−QINU`"'N/A
LO	Rémy Chassoulier	376	0.85	+0.36
European Citizens' Party	David Mongin	271	0.61	'"`UNIQ−−templatestyles−0000001D−QINU`"'N/A
UPR	Dominique Ledet	219	0.49	'"`UNIQ−−templatestyles−0000001E−QINU`"'N/A
Turnout		45,780	54.65	–10.26
2nd round result
LR	Emmanuel Maquet	20,688	60.14	+11.94
LREM	Bruno Mariage	13,714	39.86	'"`UNIQ−−templatestyles−0000001F−QINU`"'N/A
Turnout		39,837	47.56	–17.52
LR gain from PS		Swing		

=== 2012 ===
Legislative Election 2012: Somme's 3rd Constituency 1st round
Party	Candidate	Votes	%	±%
PS	Jean-Claude Buisine	16,753	31.14	+1.58
UMP	Jérôme Bignon	16,646	30.94	–9.71
RN	Nathalie Huiart	9,881	18.37	+13.72
MoDem	David Lefèvre	3,456	6.42	+4.02
Communists in Somme	Jacques Pecquery	3,331	6.19	–3.63
FG	Colette Durot	2,550	4.74	'"`UNIQ−−templatestyles−00000023−QINU`"'N/A
EELV	Franck Moncomble	616	1.14	–0.20
LO	Laurence Acoulon	264	0.49	–0.67
Solidarity, Ecology, Alternative Left	Sylvie Delsart	207	0.38	'"`UNIQ−−templatestyles−00000024−QINU`"'N/A
Le Trèfle – New Ecologists	Gérard Tabary	98	0.18	'"`UNIQ−−templatestyles−00000025−QINU`"'N/A
Turnout		54,980	64.91	–4.31

Legislative Election 2012: Somme's 3rd Constituency 2nd round
Party	Candidate	Votes	%	±%
PS	Jean-Claude Buisine	27,274	51.80	+1.95
UMP	Jérôme Bignon	25,376	48.20	–1.95
Turnout		55,093	65.08	–6.63
PS gain from UMP		Swing		

=== 2007 ===
Legislative Election 2007: Somme's 3rd constituency
Party	Candidate	Votes	%	±%
UMP	Jérôme Bignon	18,789	40.65	
PS	Vincent Peillon	13,665	29.56	
DVG	Jacques Pecquery	4,539	9.82	
CPNT	Nathalie Huiart	3,192	6.91	
FN	Chantal Joly	2,149	4.65	
MoDem	Claude Thuilliez	1,109	2.40	
Others	N/A	2,784		
Turnout		47,422	69.22	
2nd round result
UMP	Jérôme Bignon	23,703	50.15	
PS	Vincent Peillon	23,560	49.85	
Turnout		49,111	71.71	
UMP hold				

=== 2002 ===
Legislative Election 2002: Somme's 3rd constituency
Party	Candidate	Votes	%	±%
UMP	Jérôme Bignon	15,785	33.07	
PS	Vincent Peillon	12,309	25.79	
CPNT	Nicolas Lottin	6,986	14.63	
PCF	Guy Roussel	5,597	11.72	
FN	Catherine Lengele	4,099	8.59	
Others	N/A	2,961		
Turnout		49,477	73.11	
2nd round result
UMP	Jérôme Bignon	24,396	52.46	
PS	Vincent Peillon	22,106	47.54	
Turnout		48,949	72.23	
UMP gain from PS				

=== 1997 ===
Legislative Election 1997: Somme's 3rd constituency
Party	Candidate	Votes	%	±%
RPR	Jérôme Bignon	16,653	34.02	
PS	Vincent Peillon	11,852	24.21	
PCF	Jacques Pecquery	10,562	21.57	
FN	Claude Dauby	5,327	10.88	
LO	Marc Pailler	1,540	3.15	
LV	Jacques Marchand	1,281	2.62	
Others	N/A	1,742		
Turnout		51,420	78.99	
2nd round result
PS	Vincent Peillon	27,737	53.82	
RPR	Jérôme Bignon	23,802	46.18	
Turnout		54,020	83.00	
PS gain from RPR				

== Sources ==
- Official results of French elections from 2002: "Résultats électoraux officiels en France" (in French).
- Official results of French elections from 2012: "ACCUEIL > SOMME (80) > 3èmecirconscription" (in French).
- Official results of French elections from 2017: "ACCUEIL > SOMME (80) > 3èmecirconscription" (in French).
