= Somme's 5th constituency =

Constituency of the National Assembly of France

5th constituency of Somme
- inline Constituency of the National Assembly of France

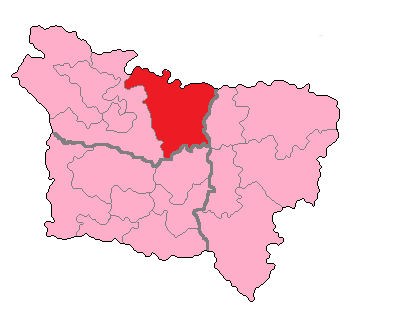
- Somme's 5th Constituency shown within Picardie
- Deputy: Yaël Ménache; RN
- Department: Somme
- Cantons: Acheux-en-Amiénois, Albert, Bray-sur-Somme, Chaulnes, Combles, Ham, Nesle, Péronne, Roisel, Rosières-en-Santerre, Roye
- Registered voters: 81,979

The 5th constituency of Somme is a French legislative constituency in the Somme département. Like the other 576 French constituencies, it elects one MP using the two-round system, with a run-off if no candidate receives over 50% of the vote in the first round.

== Description ==
The 5th constituency of the Somme covers the largely rural west of the department.

Unlike the other constituencies in Somme the 5th has remained solidly conservative throughout the Fifth Republic.

== Historic representation ==
Election	Member	Party
1958	Émile Luciani	UNR
1962	Émile Luciani	UNR
1967	Émile Luciani	UDR
1968	Émile Luciani	UDR
1973	André Audinot	DVD
1978	André Audinot	DVD
1981	André Audinot	DVD
1986	Proportional representation – no election by constituency	
1988	Gautier Audinot	RPR
1993	Gautier Audinot	RPR
1997	Gautier Audinot	RPR
2002	Stéphane Demilly	UDF
2007	Stéphane Demilly	NC
2012	Stéphane Demilly	NC
2017	Stéphane Demilly	UDI
2020	Grégory Labille	UDI
2022	Yaël Ménache	RN

== Election results ==
=== 2024 ===
Legislative Election 2024: Somme's 5th constituency
Party	Candidate	Votes	%	±%
RE (Ensemble)	Loïc Folléat	10,196	19.49	−0.45
RN	Yaël Ménache	29,281	55.98	+21.59
LFI (NFP)	Alice Berger	6,877	13.15	−7.14
LR	Séverine Mordacq	4,280	8.18	−8.70
REC	Béatrice Guilbert	672	1.28	−1.79
LO	Hélène Launay	1,000	1.91	n/a
Turnout		52,306	96.97	+47.77
Registered electors		81,191		
RN hold		Swing		

=== 2022 ===
2022 French legislative election: Somme's 5th constituency
Party	Candidate	Votes	%	±%
RN	Yaël Ménache	13,501	34.49	+13.24
LFI (NUPÉS)	Guillaume Ancelet	7,941	20.29	+3.50
LREM (Ensemble)	Virginie Caron-Decroix	7,806	19.94	N/A
LR (UDC)	Grégory Labille	6,607	16.88	–36.97
REC	Laurent Beauvarlet	1,202	3.07	N/A
Others	N/A	2,089	-	−
Turnout		39,146	49.20	–1.23
2nd round result
RN	Yaël Ménache	20,861	60.79	N/A
LFI (NUPÉS)	Guillaume Ancelet	13,453	39.21	N/A
Turnout		34,314	48.32	N/A
RN gain from UDI				

=== 2017 ===
Legislative Election 2017: Somme's 5th Constituency 1st round
Party	Candidate	Votes	%	±%
UDI	Stéphane Demilly	21,505	53.85	+9.14
FN	Loïc Grimaux	8,487	21.25	+7.17
LFI	Olivier Spinelli	4,770	11.94	n/a
PCF	Valérie Roussel	1,937	4.85	n/a
Independent	Thierry Vindevogel	1,441	3.61	n/a
DLF	Olga Sorokina-Dollé	620	1.55	n/a
Party of France	Florence Perdu	472	1.18	+0.21
LO	Régis Liévrard	439	1.10	+0.31
Independent	David Makowski	263	0.66	n/a
Turnout		41,076	50.43	–12.44
UDI gain from NM		Swing		

=== 2012 ===
Legislative Election 2012: Somme's 5th Constituency 1st round
Party	Candidate	Votes	%	±%
NM	Stéphane Demilly	22,744	44.71	–4.31
PS	Valérie Kumm	17,061	33.54	+6.58
FN	Wallerand de Saint-Just	7,161	14.08	+8.31
FG	Christine Barbier	2,263	4.45	+1.83
EELV	Élodie Héren	747	1.47	+0.17
Party of France	Monique Chapel	494	0.97	n/a
LO	Hélène Launay	401	0.79	–0.59
Turnout		51,551	62.87	–1.27

Legislative Election 2012: Somme's 5th Constituency 2nd round
Party	Candidate	Votes	%	±%
NM	Stéphane Demilly	28,864	58.12	+2.65
PS	Valérie Kumm	20,798	41.88	–2.65
Turnout		50,974	62.18	–2.27
NM hold		Swing		

=== 2007 ===
Legislative Election 2007: Somme's 5th Constituency 1st round
Party	Candidate	Votes	%	±%
NM	Stéphane Demilly	20,357	49.02	N/A
PS	Valérie Kumm	11,198	26.96	+6.79
FN	Jean-Philippe Jardin	2,398	5.77	–7.86
MoDem	Romain Cauët	1,687	4.06	N/A
PCF	Olivier Chapuis-Roux	1,087	2.62	–2.44
CPNT	Dominique Lefebvre	1,040	2.50	–4.37
Communists in Somme	Angelo Ondicana	919	2.21	N/A
LCR	Danièle Dollé	816	1.96	–0.45
LO	Hélène Launay	575	1.38	–1.40
LV	Philippe Bocquet	541	1.30	–1.02
MPF	Jean-Louis Renard	508	1.22	N/A
MNR	Claude Dauby	223	0.54	–0.42
France in Action	Dominique Benoît	182	0.44	N/A
Turnout		42,369	64.14	–1.40

Legislative Election 2007: Somme's 5th Constituency 2nd round
Party	Candidate	Votes	%	±%
NM	Stéphane Demilly	22,995	55.47	N/A
PS	Valérie Kumm	18,459	44.53	+1.07
Turnout		42,568	64.45	+1.36
NM gain from UDF		Swing		

=== 2002 ===
Legislative Election 2002: Somme's 5th constituency
Party	Candidate	Votes	%	±%
UDF	Stéphane Demilly	17,586	42.52	
PS	Valerie Kumm	8,341	20.17	
FN	Francine Fournet	5,638	13.63	
CPNT	Jean-Louis Grevin	2,843	6.87	
PCF	Olivier Chapuis-Roux	2,092	5.06	
LO	Helene Launay	1,150	2.78	
LCR	Laurence Thiery	998	2.41	
Others	N/A	1,755		
Turnout		42,566	65.54	
2nd round result
UDF	Stéphane Demilly	21,962	56.54	
PS	Valerie Kumm	16,881	43.46	
Turnout		40,969	63.09	
UDF gain from RPR				

=== 1997 ===
Legislative Election 1997: Somme's 5th constituency
Party	Candidate	Votes	%	±%
RPR	Gautier Audinot	18,436	40.00	
PS	Danielle Destenay	11,531	25.02	
FN	Marie-Claire Bouvet	6,603	14.33	
PCF	Olivier Chapuis-Roux	4,230	9.18	
DVD	Daniel Savary	1,911	4.15	
LO	Yves Puig	1,535	3.33	
Others	N/A	1,841		
Turnout		47,969	76.67	
2nd round result
RPR	Gautier Audinot	23,591	50.27	
PS	Danielle Destenay	23,342	49.73	
Turnout		49,023	78.49	
RPR hold				
