= Jérôme Bignon (politician) =

French politician (1949–2026)

Member of the French Senate for Somme
- Incumbent
- Assumed office 1 October 2014

Personal details
- Born: 1 January 1949 Neuilly-sur-Seine, France
- Died: 30 September 2026 (aged 77)
- Party: The Republicans

Jérôme Bignon (1 January 1949 – 30 September 2026) was a French politician who was a member of the National Assembly of France. He represented the Somme department, and was a member of the Union for a Popular Movement.

Upon the death of his father, Charles Bignon, who served as a deputy from 1968 to 1978, he became mayor of Bermesnil, a position he held for twenty-one years. He subsequently served as the deputy for the Somme's 3rd constituency from 1993 to 1997 and from 2002 to 2012. He was a senator for the Somme from 2014 to 2020.

Bignon died on 30 September 2026, at the age of 77.
