= Zahia Hamdane =

French politician (born 1965)

Member of the French National Assembly for Somme's 2nd constituency
- Incumbent
- Assumed office 8 July 2024
- Preceded by: Ingrid Dordain

Personal details
- Born: 14 May 1965 (age 61) Amiens
- Party: La France Insoumise

Zahia Hamdane (born 14 May 1965) is a French politician from La France Insoumise (LFI). In the 2024 French legislative election, she was elected to the National Assembly.

== Biography ==
=== Family background ===
She is the daughter of a harki father and a mother who was a member of the Algerian National Liberation Front. She grew up in the Briquetterie estate, a northern district of Amiens, in a modest environment. Her father was hired as a skilled labourer, first on the assembly lines of the Ferodo factory, a supplier to the automobile industry, then at the Cosserat factory, the flagship of the Amiens textile industry. For her part, her mother carried out sewing work for the inhabitants of the estate.

Zahia Hamdane is a trained special needs educator. She worked as a recreation center facilitator, then as a special educator before becoming director of a child protection facility.

She is the mother of three children.

=== Political career ===
A left-wing activist for years without being a member of a political party, she joined La France Insoumise in 2016. She said she found in LFI a framework “allowing more autonomy than other parties”.

She also became involved in civil society, becoming director of the Association for the Protection of Children and Adults (ADSEA) in the Somme.

She has been a regional opposition councillor for Hauts-de-France since 2021 and sits on the Standing Committee and the Family and Social Affairs Committee (family, health, social action, citizenship, community life).

In 2022, she was a candidate for the New Ecological and Social People's Union (NUPES) in the legislative elections but had to narrowly lose in the second round to Barbara Pompili, who was elected as a deputy.

After the dissolution of the National Assembly by President Emmanuel Macron, she was elected as a deputy in the 2024 French legislative election on 7 July following a three-way contest pitting her, in the second round, against Hubert de Jenlis, vice-president of the Somme departmental council and deputy mayor of Amiens, candidate for the Ensemble coalition, and Damien Toumi, candidate for the National Rally (RN). She describes an "intense and violent" campaign, marked by several attacks on left-wing activists.

== See also ==
- List of deputies of the 17th National Assembly of France
