= Barbara Pompili =

French politician and diplomat (born 1975)

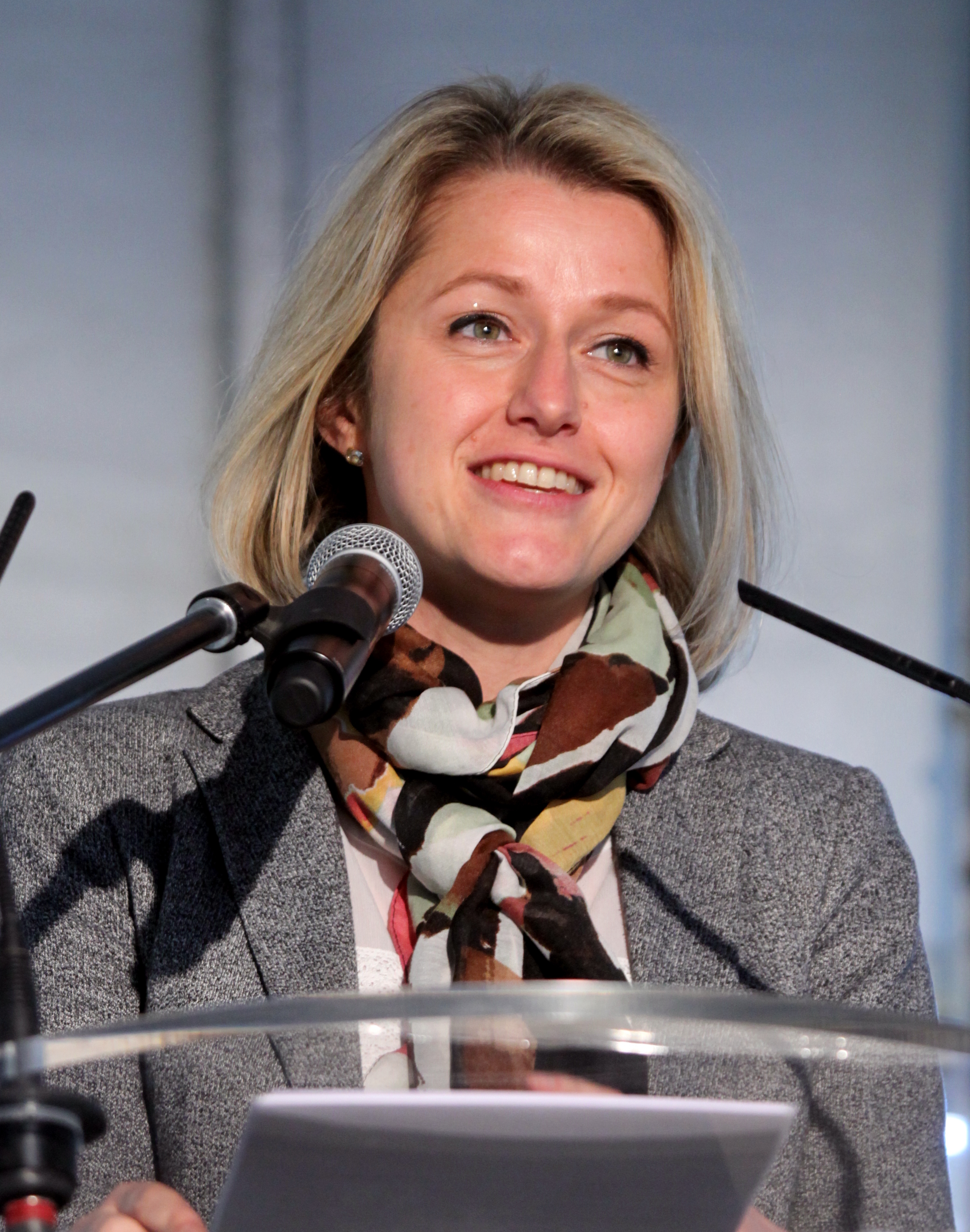

Minister of the Ecological Transition
- In office 6 July 2020 – 20 May 2022
- Prime Minister: Jean Castex
- Preceded by: Élisabeth Borne
- Succeeded by: Amélie de Montchalin

President of the Sustainable Development, Spatial and Regional Planning Committee of the National Assembly
- In office 29 June 2017 – 15 July 2020
- Preceded by: Jean-Paul Chanteguet
- Succeeded by: Véronique Riotton

Secretary of State for Biodiversity
- In office 11 February 2016 – 10 May 2017
- Prime Minister: Manuel Valls; Bernard Cazeneuve
- Preceded by: Position established
- Succeeded by: Position abolished

Member of the National Assembly for Somme's 2nd constituency
- In office 21 June 2022 – 24 September 2023
- Preceded by: Cécile Delpirou
- Succeeded by: Ingrid Dordain
- In office 21 June 2017 – 6 August 2020
- Preceded by: Romain Joron
- Succeeded by: Cécile Delpirou
- In office 20 June 2012 – 12 March 2016
- Preceded by: Olivier Jardé
- Succeeded by: Romain Joron

Personal details
- Born: Barbara Annick Pompili; 13 June 1975 (age 51) Bois-Bernard, France
- Party: Renaissance (2017–present); Ecologist Party (2016–present)
- Other party: Europe Ecology – The Greens (2010–2015); The Greens (2000–2010)
- Children: 1
- Education: Sciences Po Lille

Barbara Annick Pompili (French pronunciation: [baʁbaʁa pɔ̃pili]; born 13 June 1975) is a French politician who served as Minister of the Ecological Transition under Prime Minister Jean Castex from 2020 to 2022. She previously served as Secretary of State for Biodiversity from 2016 to 2017.

Pompili represented the 2nd constituency of Somme in the National Assembly from 2012 to 2016, from 2017 to 2020 and again from 2022 to 2023. A member of Renaissance (RE, formerly La République En Marche!) since 2017, she was a member of The Greens (LV) from 2000 to 2010 and Europe Ecology – The Greens (EELV) from 2010 until 2015.

On 26 March 2025, she was appointed ambassador-at-large for the environment by President Emmanuel Macron.

== Education ==
Born in Bois-Bernard, Pas-de-Calais, Pompili grew up in Liévin. She graduated from Sciences Po Lille.

== Political career ==
=== Early career ===
Pompili ran for a seat in the National Assembly in 2007 in Paris's 13th constituency for The Greens, but placed seventh with just 2.23% of the first-round vote. In the 2008 Paris municipal election she headed The Greens' list in the 15th arrondissement, placing fifth with 4% of the first-round vote.

She was elected to the National Assembly in Somme's 2nd constituency in the 2012 legislative election. She became the first female president of a parliamentary group in the lower house, co-leading the EELV group with François de Rugy, from 2012 until 2016. She also served on the Committee on Education and Cultural Affairs.

=== Secretary of State for Biodiversity, 2016–2017 ===
In 2016, Pompili was appointed Secretary of State for Biodiversity in the government of Prime Minister Manuel Valls, under the Minister of Ecology, Ségolène Royal. She was reappointed when the government of Prime Minister Bernard Cazeneuve took office. During her time in office, she notably defended legislation establishing of the French Agency for Biodiversity (AFB) and authorising the ratification of the Nagoya Protocol, and oversaw the entry into force of a French tax targeting palm oil, a ban on neonicotinoids-based pesticides, and a plan again invasive species in 2016.

=== Return to the National Assembly ===
Pompili was an early supporter of Emmanuel Macron and the first minister in government to openly support Macron's candidacy in the 2017 presidential election. She subsequently stood as a candidate of En Marche (EM, later La République En Marche!) in Somme's 2nd constituency, which she had represented from 2012 until 2016. She was reelected in the 2017 legislative election and subsequently served as chairwoman of the Sustainable Development, Spatial and Regional Planning Committee from 2017 until 2020. In this capacity, she led a 2018 parliamentary inquiry into France's nuclear safety and security.

In September 2018, after François de Rugy's appointment to the government, Pompili ran for the presidency of the National Assembly. In an internal vote within the LREM parliamentary group, she came in second; the position eventually went to the group's then-president Richard Ferrand.

=== Minister of the Ecological Transition, 2020–2022 ===
Pompili co-founded a minor political party, En Commun, in 2020. Later in 2020 she was reappointed to the government as Minister for the Ecological Transition under Prime Minister Jean Castex.

During Pompili's time in office, France banned plastic packaging for nearly all fruit and vegetables from 2022 in a bid to reduce plastic waste.

When state-owned electric utility EDF shut down four reactors – with a combined daily capacity of 6 gigawatts (GW), equivalent to around 13 percent of current availability in France – due to technical problems in late 2021, Pompili asked the company to conduct an independent audit on the availability of its nuclear power stations.

In 2022 she left the government and returned to the National Assembly, securing her reelection to a third term in the legislative election.

== After politics ==
In October 2023, Pompili was appointed to the General Secretariat for Ecological Planning (SGPE), serving as President Macron's Special Envoy for the 2024 One Water Summit. In March 2025 she was appointed ambassador-at-large for the environment.

== Political positions ==
In July 2019, Pompili decided not to align with her parliamentary group's majority and became one of 52 LREM members who abstained from a vote on the French ratification of the European Union's Comprehensive Economic and Trade Agreement (CETA) with Canada. She also defended amendments on the transparency and labeling of genetically modified organisms used in food products in defiance of the government's advice, as well as opposed delays in the country's strategy to reduce pesticides use and the phase-out of glyphosate.

In September 2020, Pompili publicly endorsed Aurore Bergé for the position of the LREM parliamentary group's chair; the position instead went to Christophe Castaner.

== Honours ==
- Knight of the Legion of Honour (2024)
