= Léon Deffontaines =

French politician (born 1996)

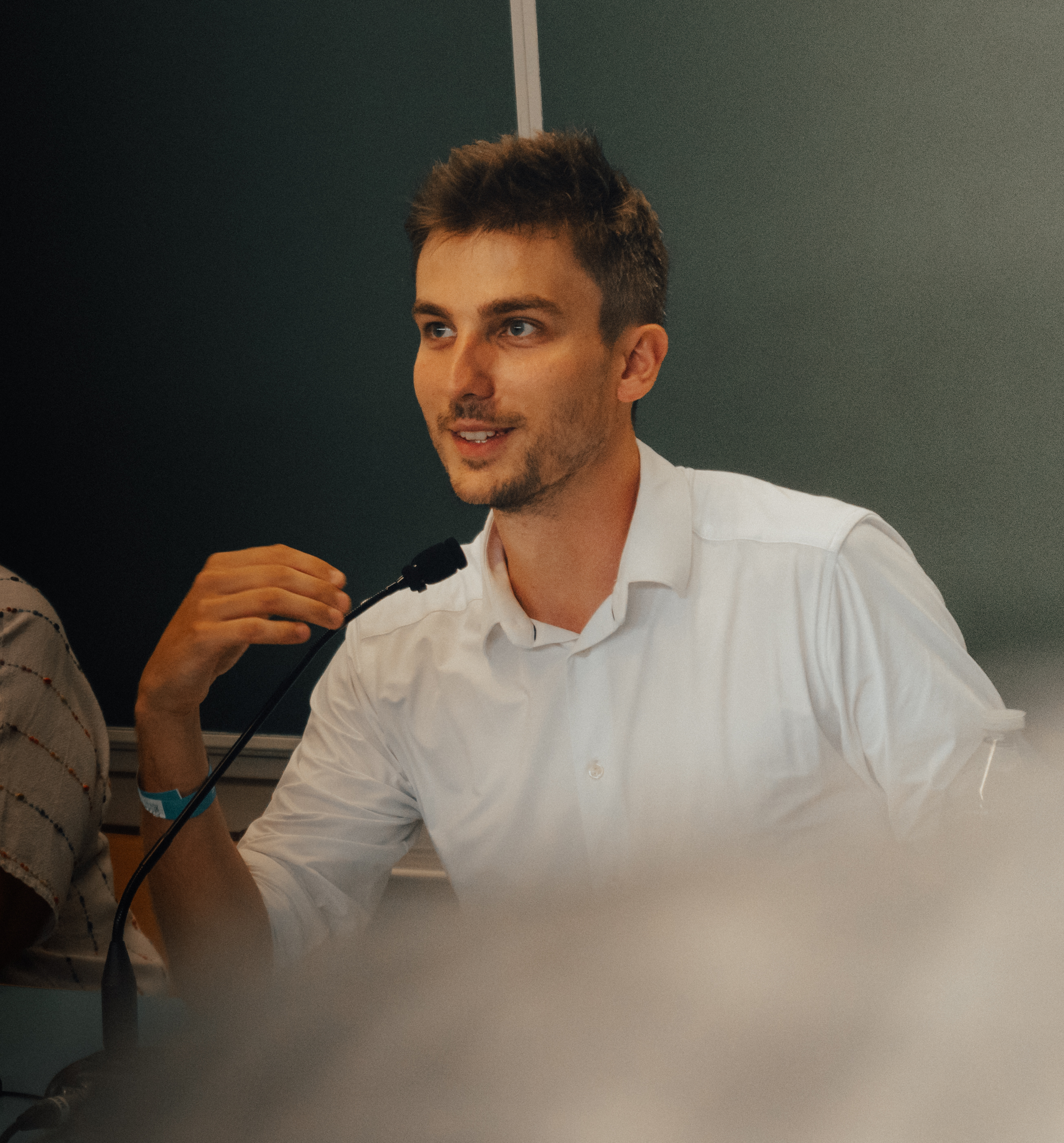
- Léon Deffontaines in 2023.

General Secretary of the Young Communist Movement of France
- In office June 2019 – 1 July 2023

Personal details
- Born: 15 March 1996 (age 29); Amiens, France
- Political party: French Communist Party

Léon Deffontaines (born 15 March 1996, in Amiens) is a French politician from the French Communist Party.

In 2013, he joined the Young Communist Movement of France and was its general secretary from 2019 to 2023.

Deffontaines was spokesperson for Fabien Roussel during the 2022 French presidential election, he is designated lead candidate for the communists for the 2024 European Parliament elections in France.

== Biography ==
Léon Deffontaines was born on 15 March 1996. He is the son of a florist and a psychologist and comes from a family of farmers. In 2013, he joined the Young Communist Movement of France. In 2014, when he was 18 years old and a high school student in his economic and social final year, he was a candidate for the 2014 municipal elections in Amiens.

Deffontaines began studying law and political science, as well as education, and took on multiple odd jobs. He was then a member of a homework help association for young people in difficulty in sensitive areas of the city of Amiens and intended to become a teacher.

His first years of communist activism were marked by the struggle of employees at the Goodyear site in Amiens, whose closure in 2014 led to the dismissal of more than 1,100 people, and the mobilizations against the reforms of François Hollande. He was elected federal secretary of the Young Communist Movement in the Somme in 2016, and was then elected general secretary in 2019 and stayed at this position until June 2023.

Deffontaines was spokesperson for Fabien Roussel during the 2022 French presidential election.

In June 2023, while he is spokesperson for the French Communist Party, he is expected to head the communist list during the 2024 European Parliament elections in France. It is also envisaged that it will be in first position for the communists in the case of a common list with other parties. On 1 July 2023, he was designated, by the national council of the PCF, the lead candidate for the communists for the 2024 European Parliament election. In the 2024 French legislative election, he was the candidate of the New Popular Front in Somme's 3rd constituency. He came in third place.

== Work ==
- Pour que jeunesse se fasse. Le Temps des cerises. 22 September 2022. p. 100. ISBN 978-2-37071-252-3.
