= Marthe Delpirou =

French resistance fighter

Marthe Delpirou or Marthe Delpirou-Baron (1900–1945) was a lawyer and a French resistance fighter, member of Combat Zone Nord.

Doctor of Laws, secretary of Elizabeth Dussauze, member of Ricou group, she was arrested on 28 June 1942 by the Geheime Feldpolizei. She died of exhaustion at Ravensbruck camp, where she had been sent at the end of her sentence. Her body was never found.

A street bears her name in the French town of Saint-Pierre-Quiberon.
