= Cécile Delpirou =

French politician

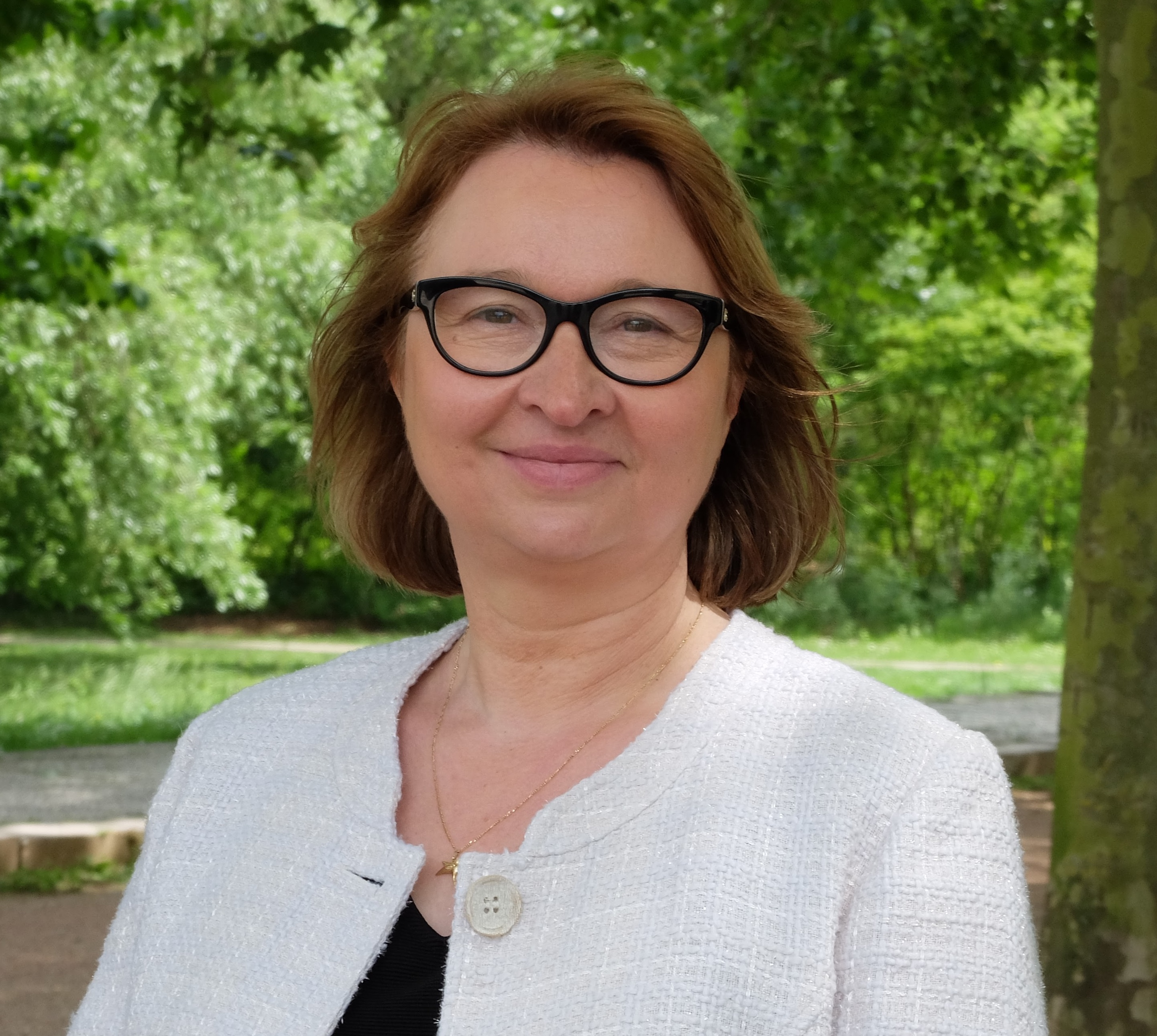

Member of the National Assembly for Somme's 2nd constituency
- In office 7 August 2020 – 20 June 2022
- Preceded by: Barbara Pompili
- Succeeded by: Barbara Pompili

Personal details
- Born: 23 March 1964 (age 62) Paris, France
- Party: En Commun

Cécile Delpirou (born 23 March 1964) is a French politician from En Commun who served as Member of Parliament for Somme's 2nd constituency from 2020 to 2022.

== Early life and career ==
She was born in Saint-Maur-des-Fossés in Paris. An engineer by profession, Delpirou was active in the French Confederation of Management – General Confederation of Executives while working at the Whirlpool Corporation plant at Amiens.

== Political career ==
In the 2017 French legislative election, she was the substitute candidate of Barbara Pompili. She joined Parliament in August 2020.

== See also ==
- List of deputies of the 15th National Assembly of France
