= Yaël Ménache =

French politician (born 1985)

Yaël Menache

Member of the National Assembly for Somme's 5th constituency
- Incumbent
- Assumed office 22 June 2022
- Preceded by: Grégory Labille

Personal details
- Born: 12 May 1985 (age 41) Peronne, France
- Party: National Rally
- Education: University of Lille; Catholic University of Lille

Yaël Menache (born 12 May 1985 in Peronne, France) is a French politician of the National Rally.

She serves as a Member of the National Assembly for Somme's 5th constituency since 2022.

== Biography ==
=== Early life and career ===
Menache was born in 1985 in Peronne to a family of Iraqi-Jewish descent and grew up in Somme. Her father worked as an accountant and her mother was a civil servant. She obtained a degree in philosophy at the University of Lille and completed a course in law at the Catholic University of Lille. She then worked as a business manager for an IT company.

She is married and has two children.

=== Political career ===
Menache has stated that she joined the National Rally out of love for France and "patriotic values" but also to counter antisemitism within the party and elsewhere in French politics. In 2021, she unsuccessfully stood for the RN in Péronne during the municipal elections of that year and also unsuccessfully contested Somme during the regional elections.

In 2022, she was appointed department secretary for the RN in Somme. During the 2022 French legislative election she contested Somme's 5th constituency and was successful at gaining the seat during the second round.

In 2024, following the dissolution of the national assembly by French president Macron and the snap legislative election, she is reelected in the first round with 56%.
