= Matthias Renault =

French politician (born 1988)

Member of the French National Assembly for Somme's 3rd constituency
- Incumbent
- Assumed office 18 July 2024
- Preceded by: Emmanuel Maquet

Personal details
- Born: 2 May 1988 (age 37)
- Party: National Rally

Matthias Renault (born 2 May 1988) is a French politician of the National Rally who was elected member of the National Assembly for Somme's 3rd constituency in 2024. He previously worked as parliamentary assistant to the National Rally in the Finance Committee, and served as a judge in the Regional Court of Auditors.
