= Emmanuel Maquet =

French politician

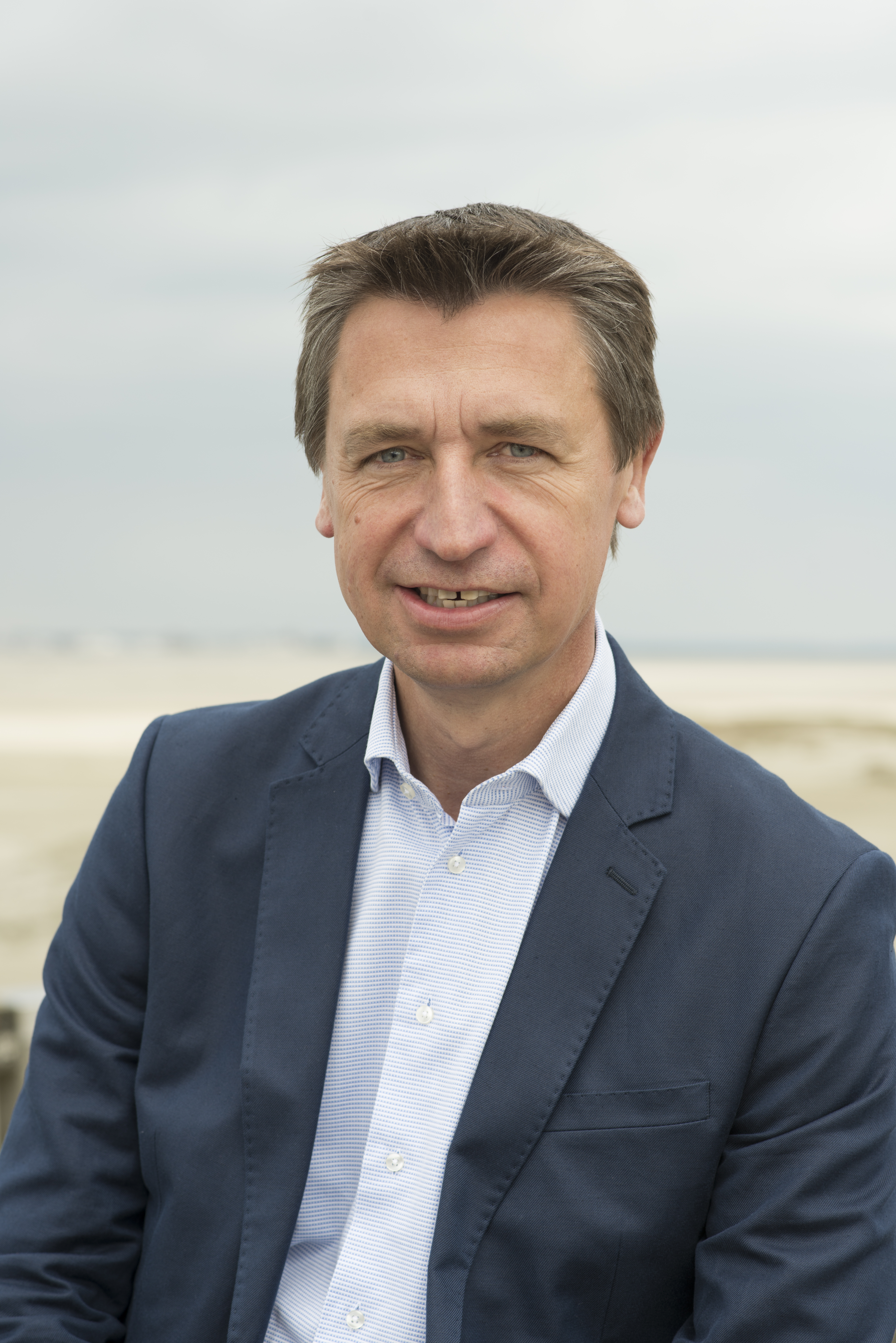

Member of the National Assembly for Somme's 3rd constituency
- In office 21 June 2017 – 9 June 2024
- Preceded by: Jean-Claude Buisine

Personal details
- Born: 2 June 1968 (age 58) Dieppe, Seine-Maritime, France
- Party: Republican
- Education: University of Rouen

Emmanuel Maquet (born 2 June 1968) is a French Republican politician who has represented Somme's 3rd constituency in the National Assembly from 2017 to 2024.
