= Somme (department) =

Department of France

Somme Sonme (Picard)
- Department of France
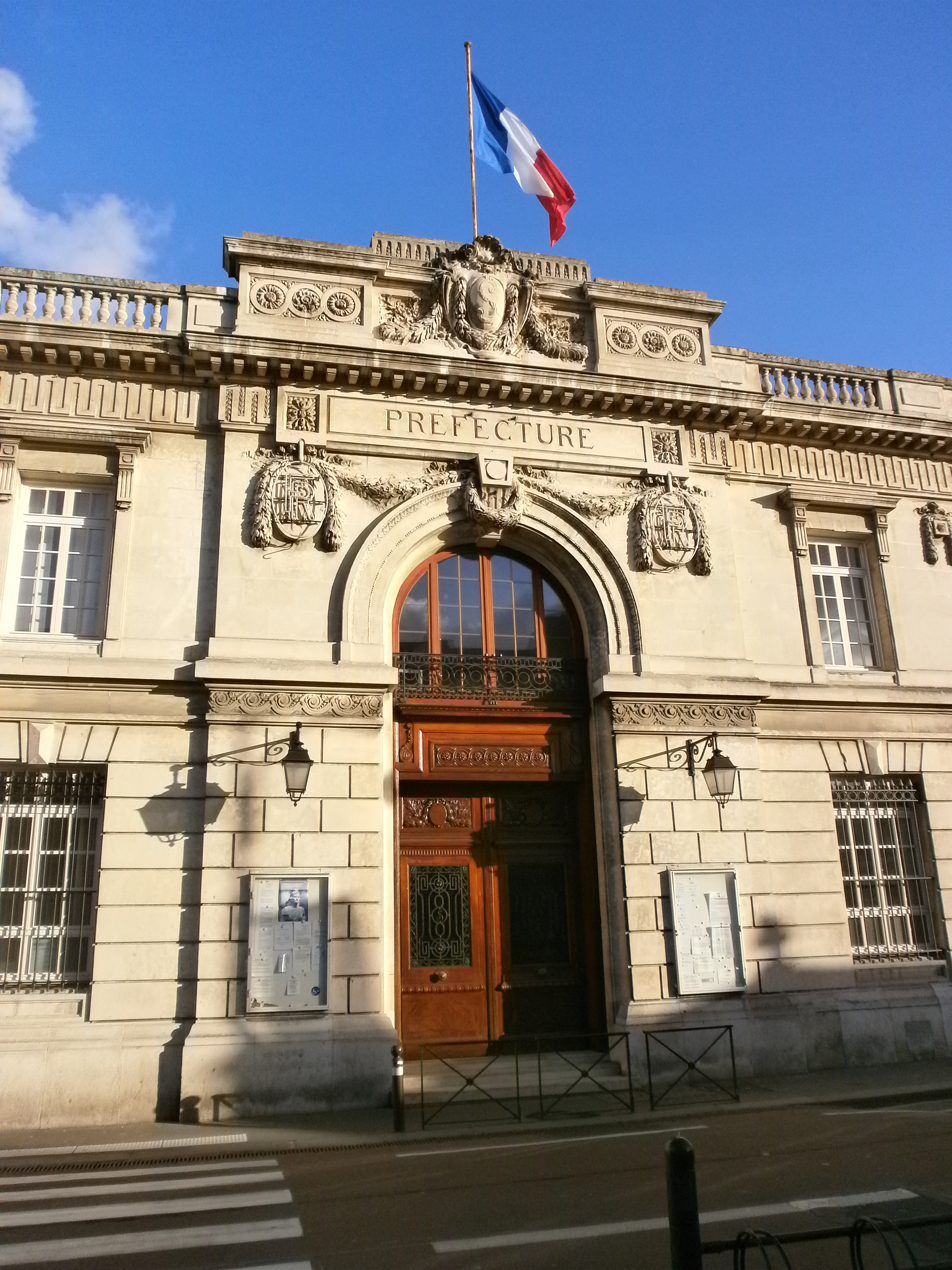
- Prefecture building of the Somme department, in Amiens

- Flag Coat of arms

- Location of Somme in France
- Coordinates: 49°53′N 02°25′E
- Country: France
- Region: Hauts-de-France
- Prefecture: Amiens
- Subprefectures: Abbeville; Montdidier; Péronne

Government
  - President of the Departmental Council: Stéphane Haussoulier

Area^{1}
  - Total: 6,170 km^{2} (2,380 sq mi)

Population (2023)
  - Total: 565,413
  - Rank: 44th
  - Density: 91.6/km^{2} (237/sq mi)
- Time zone: UTC+1 (CET)
  - Summer (DST): UTC+2 (CEST)
- ISO 3166 code: FR-80
- Department number: 80
- Arrondissements: 4
- Cantons: 23
- Communes: 771
- ^1 French Land Register data, which exclude estuaries, and lakes, ponds, and glaciers larger than 1 km^{2}

The Somme (French pronunciation: [sɔm]; Picard: Sonme) is a department of France, located in the north of the country and named after the Somme river. It is part of the Hauts-de-France region. It is bordered by Pas-de-Calais and Nord to the north, Aisne to the east, Oise to the south and Seine-Maritime to the southwest. To the northwest, its coastline faces the English Channel and it shares maritime borders with Kent and East Sussex in the United Kingdom. It had a population of 565,413 in 2023.

The north central area of the Somme was the site of a series of battles during World War I, including the particularly significant Battle of the Somme in 1916. As a result of this and other battles fought in the area, the department is home to numerous military cemeteries and several major monuments commemorating the many soldiers from various countries who died on its battlefields. The 1346 Battle of Crécy, a major English victory early in the Hundred Years' War, also took place in this department.

== History ==
The department was formed in 1790 from a large part of the province of Picardy (comprising Vermandois, Santerre, Amiénois, Ponthieu, Vimeu, and Marquenterre) and a small portion of Artois.

The toponymy of Somme is speculated to come from a Gaulish term, Sumena.

In 2012, residents voted on potential demonyms, picking "Samariens". This was based on the Latin name for the Somme River, Samara, meaning "long tranquil river".

== Geography ==
The Somme department is in the current region of Hauts-de-France and is surrounded by the departments of Pas-de-Calais, Nord, Aisne, Oise and Seine-Maritime. In the northwest, it has a coast on the English Channel. The main rivers are the Somme and its tributaries (Avre, Ancre and Noye, the Authie) as well as the Bresle.

=== Principal towns ===
The most populous commune is Amiens, the prefecture. As of 2023, there are nine communes with more than 5,000 inhabitants:

Commune	Population (2023)
Amiens	136,449
Abbeville	22,395
Albert	9,521
Péronne	7,090
Corbie	5,982
Montdidier	5,935
Roye	5,833
Doullens	5,751
Longueau	5,680

== Battles of the Somme ==
At the beginning of the First World War, during the Race to the Sea of September and November 1914, the Somme became the site of the Battle of Albert. The battle was a five-day engagement between 25 and 29 September, with the French Tenth Army attacking at Albert and pushing toward Bapaume, and the German Sixth Army counter-attacking back towards Albert. The line settled around the town of Thiepval and remained there until July 1916, when the Battle of the Somme was fought on and around the same ground.

The Battle of the Somme was one of the most costly battles of World War I, by the number of troop casualties, as Allied forces attempted to break through the German lines along a 40 kilometres (25 mi) front north and south of the River Somme. The Allies had originally intended the Somme to be the site of one of several simultaneous major offensives by Allied powers against the Central Powers in 1916. However, before these offensives could begin, the Germans attacked first, engaging the Allies at the Battle of Verdun. As this battle dragged on, the purpose of the Somme campaign (which was still in the planning stage) shifted from striking a decisive blow against Germany to drawing German forces away from Verdun and relieving the Allied forces there. By its end, however, losses an the Somme exceeded those at Verdun.

While Verdun would bite deep in the national consciousness of France for generations, the Somme would have the same effect on generations of Britons. The battle is best remembered for its first day, 1 July 1916, on which the British suffered 57,420 casualties, including 19,240 dead—the bloodiest day in the history of the British Army to this day. As terrible as the battle was for the British Empire troops who suffered there, it naturally affected the other nationalities as well. By the end of the battle, the British had learned many lessons in modern warfare, while the Germans had suffered irreplaceable losses. British historian Sir James Edmonds stated, "It is not too much to claim that the foundations of the final victory on the Western Front were laid by the Somme offensive of 1916".

For the first time, the home front in Britain was exposed to the horrors of modern war with the release of the propaganda film The Battle of the Somme, which used actual footage from the first days of the battle.

== Demographics ==
Population development since 1801:

Historical population

Year	Pop.	±% p.a.
1801	459,453	—
1806	494,642	+1.49%
1821	508,710	+0.19%
1831	543,924	+0.67%
1841	559,680	+0.29%
1851	570,641	+0.19%
1861	572,646	+0.04%
1872	557,015	−0.25%
1881	550,837	−0.12%
1891	546,495	−0.08%
1901	537,848	−0.16%
1911	520,161	−0.33%
1921	452,624	−1.38%
1931	466,626	+0.31%

Year	Pop.	±% p.a.
1936	467,479	+0.04%
1946	441,368	−0.57%
1954	464,153	+0.63%
1962	488,225	+0.63%
1968	511,491	+0.78%
1975	538,462	+0.74%
1982	544,570	+0.16%
1990	547,825	+0.07%
1999	555,551	+0.16%
2007	565,910	+0.23%
2012	571,154	+0.18%
2017	572,443	+0.05%
2023	565,413	−0.21%

== Politics ==
The president of the departmental council is Stéphane Haussoulier, elected in July 2021.

=== Presidential elections 2nd round ===
Election	Winning candidate	Party	%	2nd place candidate	Party	%
2022	Emmanuel Macron	LREM	45.37	Marine Le Pen	RN	54.63
2017	Emmanuel Macron	LREM	54.22	Marine Le Pen	FN	45.78
2012	François Hollande	PS	54.41	Nicolas Sarkozy	UMP	45.59
2007	Nicolas Sarkozy	UMP	50.46	Ségolène Royal	PS	49.54
2002	Jacques Chirac	RPR	78.26	Jean-Marie Le Pen	FN	21.74

=== Current National Assembly representatives ===
Constituency	Member	Party
Somme's 1st constituency	François Ruffin	Debout!
Somme's 2nd constituency	Zahia Hamdane	La France Insoumise
Somme's 3rd constituency	Matthias Renault	National Rally
Somme's 4th constituency	Jean-Philippe Tanguy	National Rally
Somme's 5th constituency	Yaël Ménache	National Rally

== Tourism ==
=== Image gallery ===
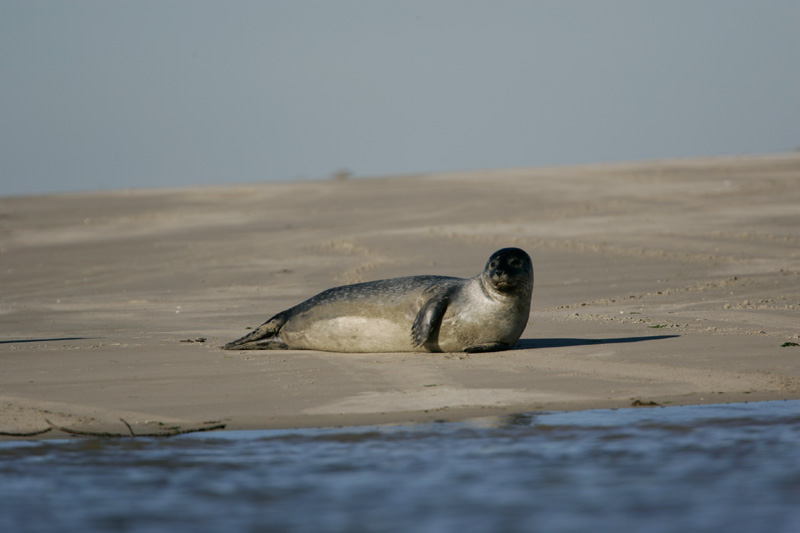
Seal in the bay of Somme

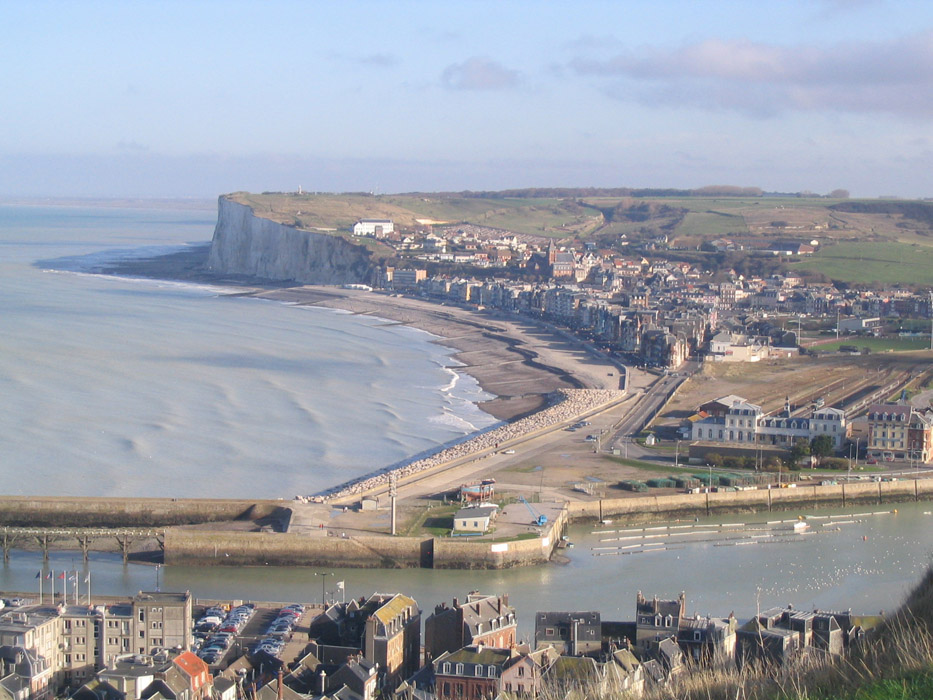
View of Mers-les-Bains

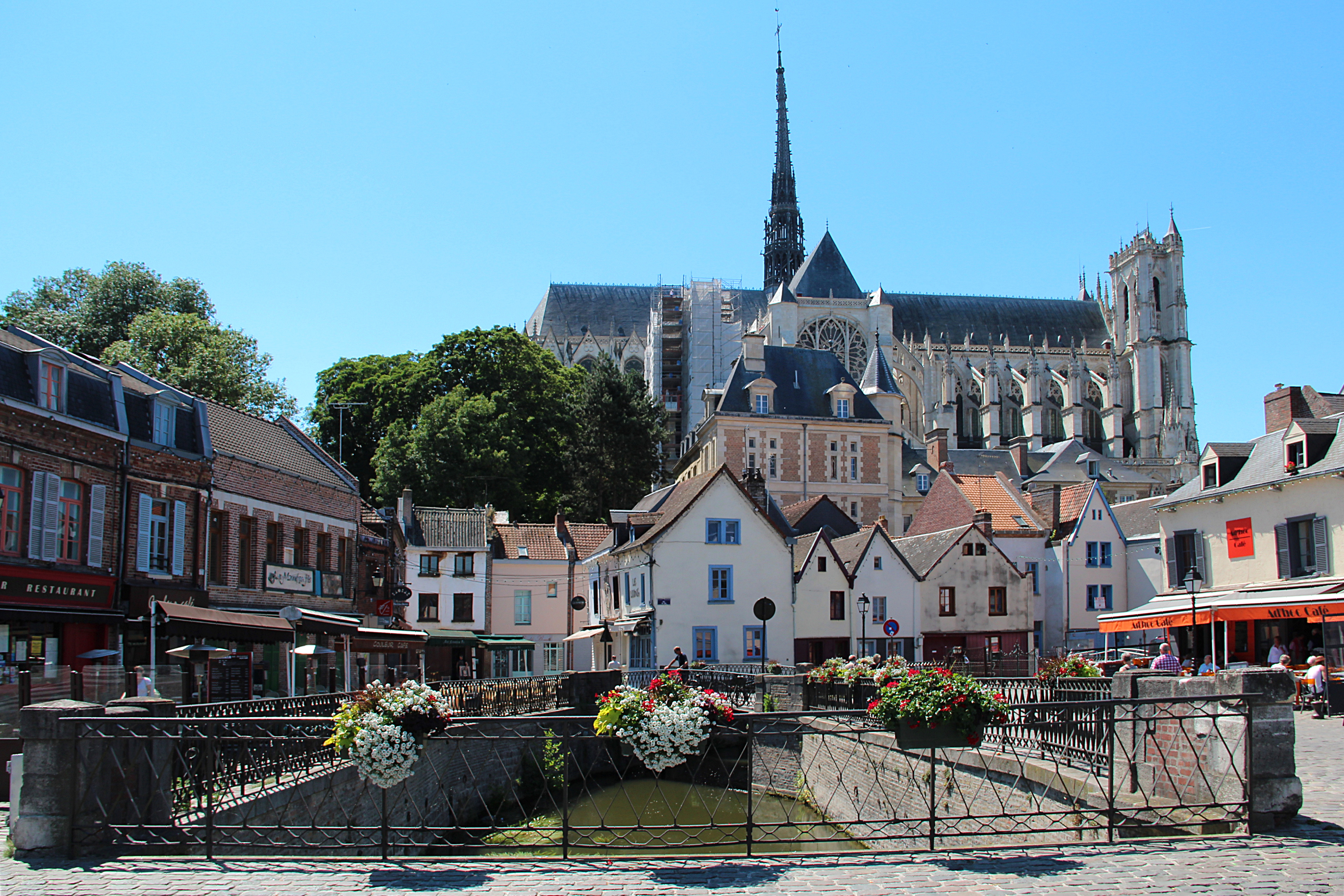
Amiens

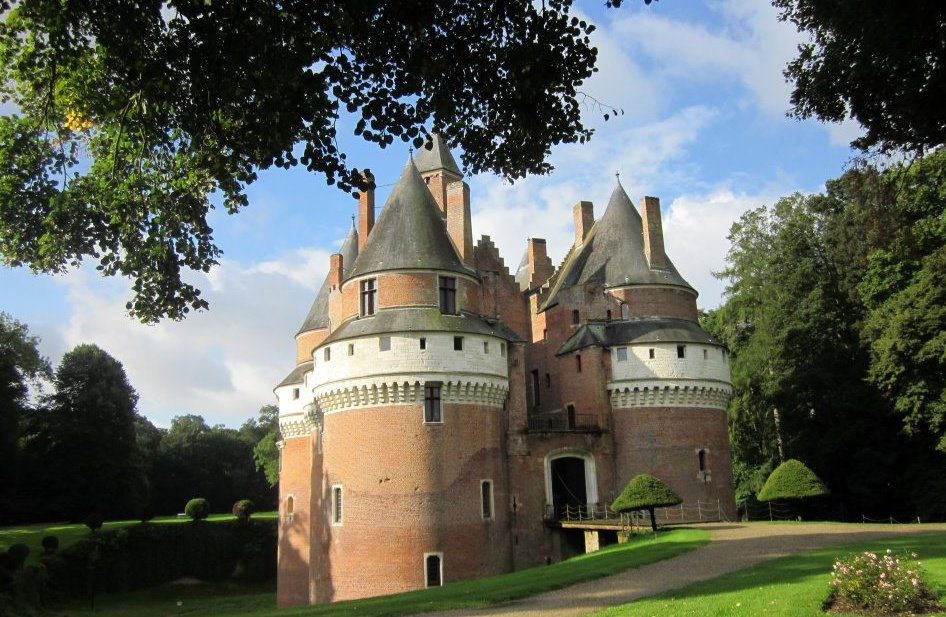
Château de Rambures

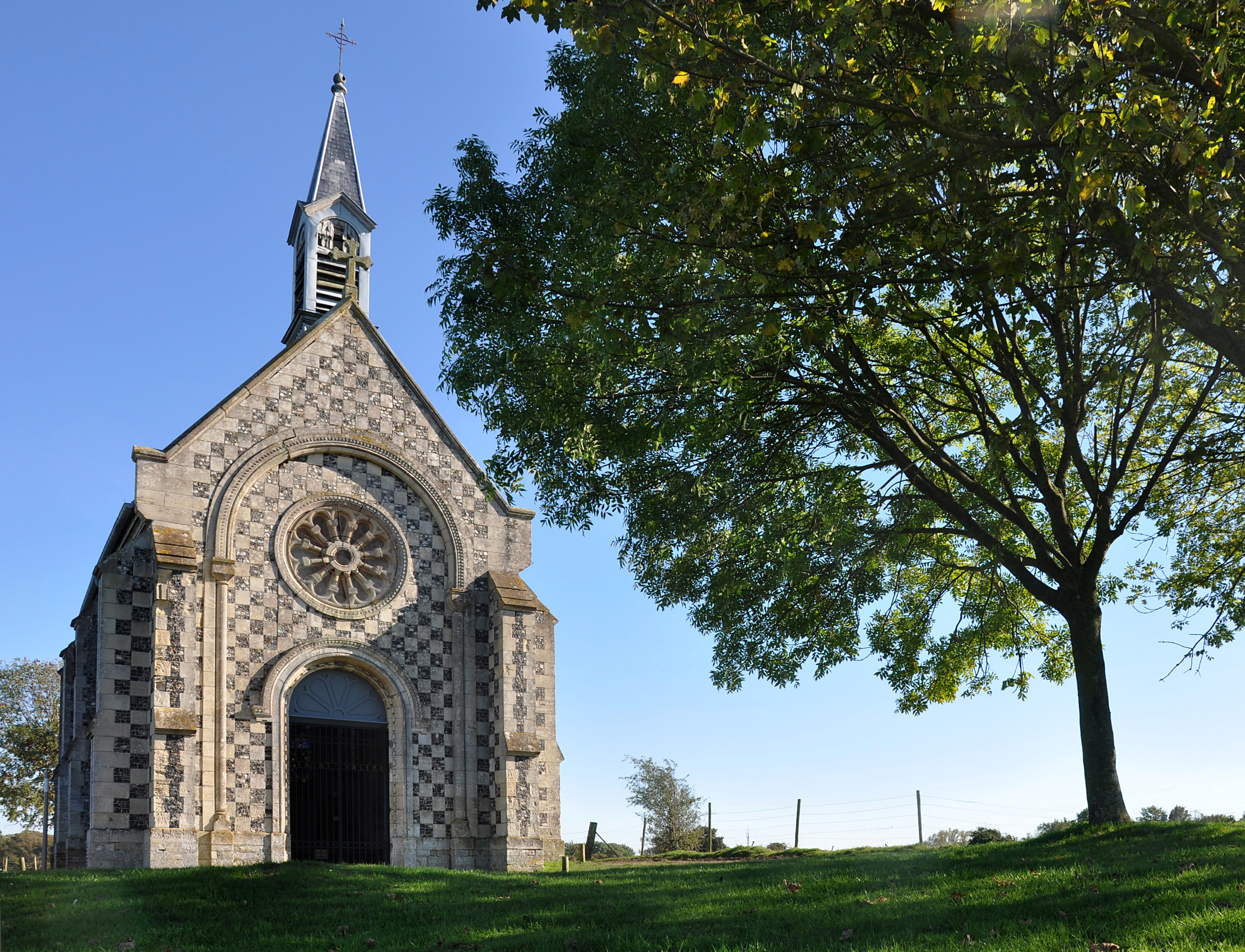
Chapel in Saint-Valery-sur-Somme

== See also ==
- Cantons of the Somme department
- Communes of the Somme department
- Arrondissements of the Somme department
