= Nord's 8th constituency =

Constituency of the National Assembly of France

8th constituency of the Nord
- inline Constituency of the National Assembly of France

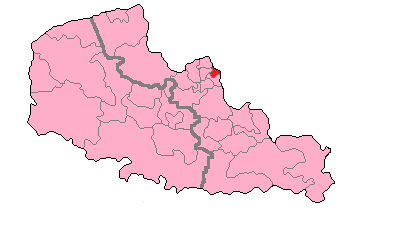
- Nord's 8th Constituency shown within Nord-Pas-de-Calais
- Deputy: David Guiraud; LFI
- Department: Nord
- Cantons: Roubaix-Centre, Roubaix-Est, Roubaix-Nord
- Registered voters: 69,044

The 8th constituency of the Nord is a French legislative constituency in the Nord département.

== Description ==
Nord's 8th constituency covers three of the four (pre-2015) cantons of the city of Roubaix with only Roubaix Ouest within Nord's 7th constituency.

Despite electing a candidate from the centre right UDF as recently as 2002 the seat appeared to be safe for the left until 2017. Dominique Baert was expelled from the Socialist Party prior to the 2012 election and faced a Green Party (France) candidate backed by the Socialist Party. He was, however, comfortably re-elected with nearly 70% of the vote but on a very low turnout of only 41%.

== Historic Representation ==
Election	Member	Party
1958	André Diligent	MRP
1962	Pierre Herman	UNR
1967	Jean Delvainquière	SFIO
1968	Pierre Herman	UDR
1973	Léonce Clérambeaux	PS
1978	Alain Faugaret	PS
1981	Alain Faugaret	PS
1986	Proportional representation - no election by constituency	
1988	Gérard Vignoble	UDF
1993	Gérard Vignoble	UDF
1997	Dominique Baert	PS
2002	Gérard Vignoble	UDF
2007	Dominique Baert	PS
2012	Dominique Baert	DVG
2017	Catherine Osson	LREM
2022	David Guiraud	LFI

== Election results ==
=== 2024 ===
Legislative Election 2024: Nord's 8th constituency
Party	Candidate	Votes	%	±%
RN	Ethan Leys	11,051	30.80	+10.87
LFI (NFP)	David Guiraud	17,405	48.50	+8.67
RE (Ensemble)	Tarik Mekki	5,766	16.07	−8.09
LO	Françoise Delbarre	652	1.82	−0.33
DLF	Maël Camerlynck	1,011	2.82	N/A
Turnout		35,885	97.05	+64.4
Registered electors		68,933		
2nd round result
LFI	David Guiraud	22,080	64.32	+15.82
RN	Ethan Leys	12,250	35.68	+4.88
Turnout		34,330	92.23	−4.82
Registered electors		68,959		
LFI hold		Swing		

=== 2022 ===
Legislative Election 2022: Nord's 8th constituency
Party	Candidate	Votes	%	±%
LFI (NUPÉS)	David Guiraud	8,684	39.83	+11.86
LREM (Ensemble)	Catherine Osson	5,267	24.16	-4.70
RN	Rachida Sahraoui	4,346	19.93	−2.02
LR (UDC)	Amine Elbahi	1,264	5.80	−1.86
REC	Lisa Verlande	692	3.17	N/A
PA	Christian Vermeersch	551	2.53	N/A
LO	Françoise Delbarre	469	2.15	N/A
Others	N/A	532		
Turnout		21,805	32.61	−0.82
2nd round result
LFI (NUPÉS)	David Guiraud	12,585	59.94	N/A
LREM (Ensemble)	Catherine Osson	8,412	40.06	−22.89
Turnout		20,997	32.45	+2.54
LFI gain from LREM				

=== 2017 ===
Candidate	Label	First round		Second round	
Candidate	Label	Votes	%	Votes	%
Catherine Osson	REM	6,369	28.86	11,703	62.95
Astrid Leplat	FN	4,845	21.95	6,889	37.05
Paul Zilmia	FI	4,334	19.64		
Karim Amrouni	DVG	1,709	7.74		
Léonard Delcourt	LR	1,691	7.66		
Mehdi Massrour	PS	1,074	4.87		
Christian Carlier	ECO	763	3.46		
Sandrine Vanhoorde	DLF	467	2.12		
Françoise Delbarre	EXG	354	1.60		
Madgid Khiter	DIV	213	0.97		
Nadia Bourahla	ECO	134	0.61		
Rachid Rizoug	DIV	100	0.45		
Amine Baba Aïssa	DIV	15	0.07		
Luis Da Costa	DIV	0	0.00		
Votes		22,068	100.00	18,592	100.00
Valid votes		22,068	97.31	18,592	91.65
Blank votes		449	1.98	1,225	6.04
Null votes		160	0.71	468	2.31
Turnout		22,677	33.43	20,285	29.91
Abstentions		45,148	66.57	47,537	70.09
Registered voters		67,825		67,822	
Source: Ministry of the Interior

=== 2012 ===
Legislative Election 2012: Nord's 8th constituency
Party	Candidate	Votes	%	±%
DVG	Dominique Baert	10,965	36.46	N/A
EELV	Slimane Tir	6,436	21.40	+18.79
FN	Françoise Coolzaet	6,211	20.65	+12.09
UMP	Salima Saa	3,960	13.17	−23.15
FG	Eric Mouveaux	1,490	4.95	+2.89
Others	N/A	1,012		
Turnout		30,074	43.56	−5.25
2nd round result
DVG	Dominique Baert	18,110	69.58	N/A
EELV	Slimane Tir	7,919	30.42	N/A
Turnout		26,029	37.70	−11.23
DVG gain from PS				

=== 2007 ===
Legislative Election 2007: Nord's 8th constituency
Party	Candidate	Votes	%	±%
PS	Dominique Baert	12,944	37.77	+3.32
UMP	Salem Kacet	12,448	36.32	N/A
FN	Sylvie Langlois	2,935	8.56	−6.93
MoDem	Louisa Mokhtari	2,044	5.96	N/A
LV	Zahia Rahni	894	2.61	−0.34
PCF	Fatma Menouer	705	2.06	N/A
Others	N/A	2,305		
Turnout		35,131	48.81	−4.42
2nd round result
PS	Dominique Baert	19,373	56.86	+7.04
UMP	Salem Kacet	14,697	43.14	N/A
Turnout		35,216	48.93	−1.22
PS gain from UDF				

=== 2002 ===
Legislative Election 2002: Nord's 8th constituency
Party	Candidate	Votes	%	±%
UDF	Gérard Vignoble	12,607	35.46	+6.33
PS	Dominique Baert	12,248	34.45	+9.77
FN	Sylvie Langlois	5,505	15.49	−6.73
LV	Slimane Tir	1,050	2.95	N/A
Others	N/A	4,138		
Turnout		36,225	53.23	−8.94
2nd round result
UDF	Gérard Vignoble	16,542	50.18	+11.37
PS	Dominique Baert	16,424	49.82	+6.25
Turnout		34,129	50.15	−16.91
UDF gain from PS				

=== 1997 ===
Legislative Election 1997: Nord's 8th constituency
Party	Candidate	Votes	%	±%
UDF	Gérard Vignoble	11,619	29.13	
PS	Dominique Baert	9,845	24.68	
FN	Carl Lang	8,863	22.22	
PCF	Françoise Thilliez	2,456	6.16	
LO	Marc Dubrul	1,430	3.59	
DVD	Jean-Paul Chahine	1,131	2.84	
GE	Fabienne Pertel	1,000	2.51	
DVG	Boualem Haddouche	889	2.23	
LCR	Patrick Mortal	820	2.06	
Others	N/A	1,833		
Turnout		41,597	62.17	
2nd round result
PS	Dominique Baert	19,048	43.57	
UDF	Gérard Vignoble	16,970	38.81	
FN	Carl Lang	7,704	17.62	
Turnout		44,866	67.06	
PS gain from UDF				

== Sources ==
- Official results of French elections from 1998: "Résultats électoraux officiels en France" (in French).
