= 2007 French legislative election =

- 10 June and 17 June 2007

All 577 seats to the National Assembly 289 seats were needed for a majority
- Turnout: 60.4% (▼4.0 pp) (1st round); 60.0% (▼0.4 pp) (2nd round)
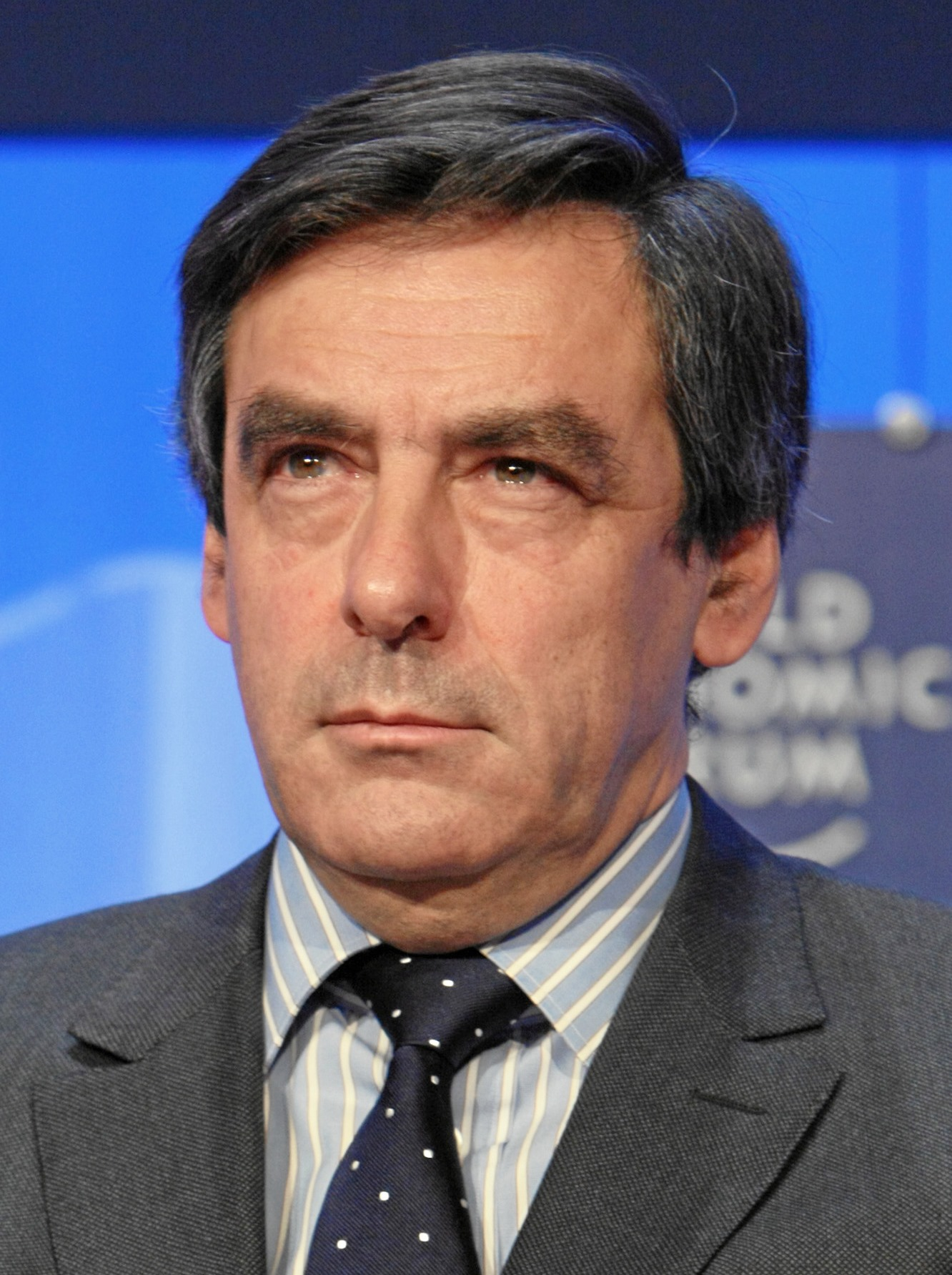

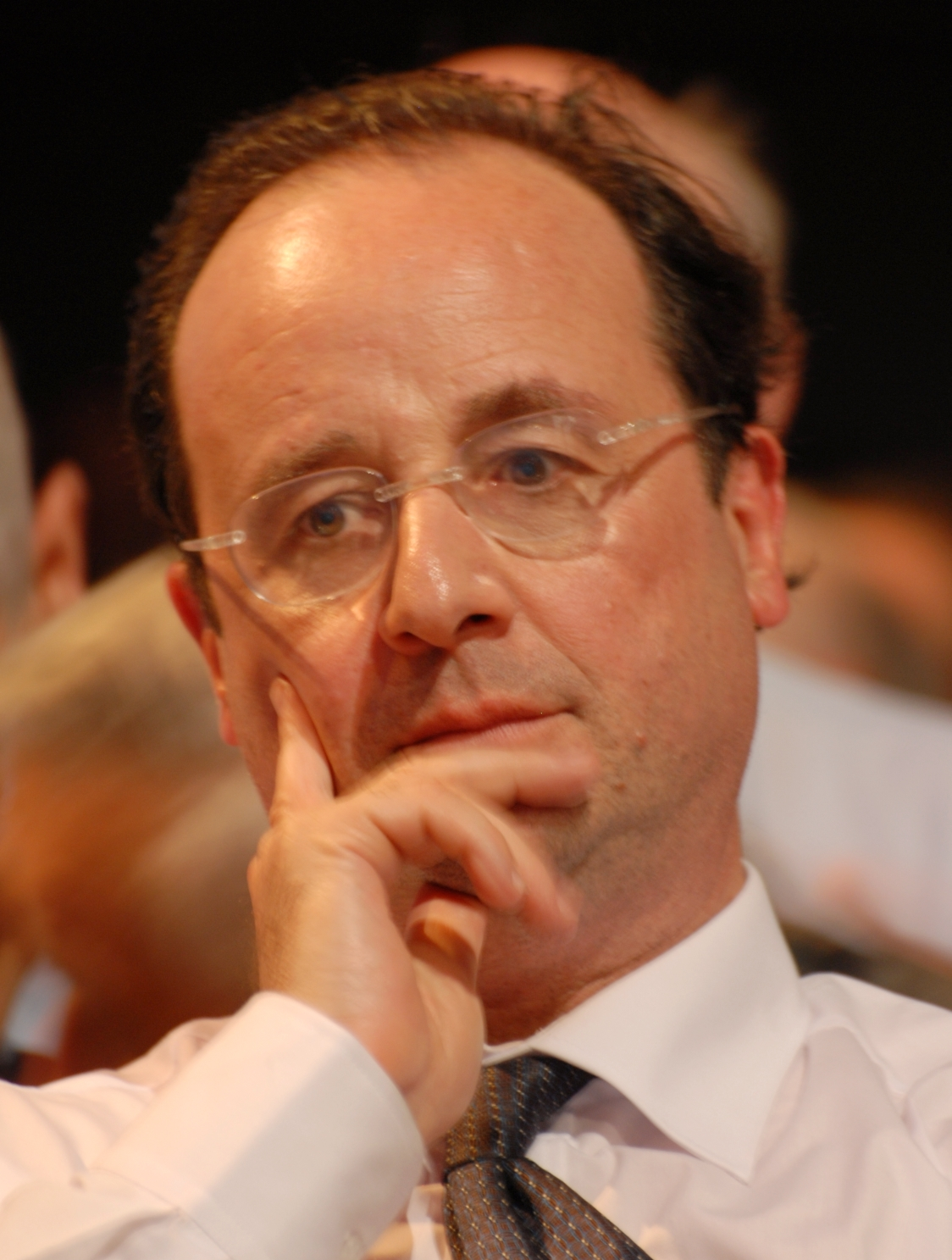

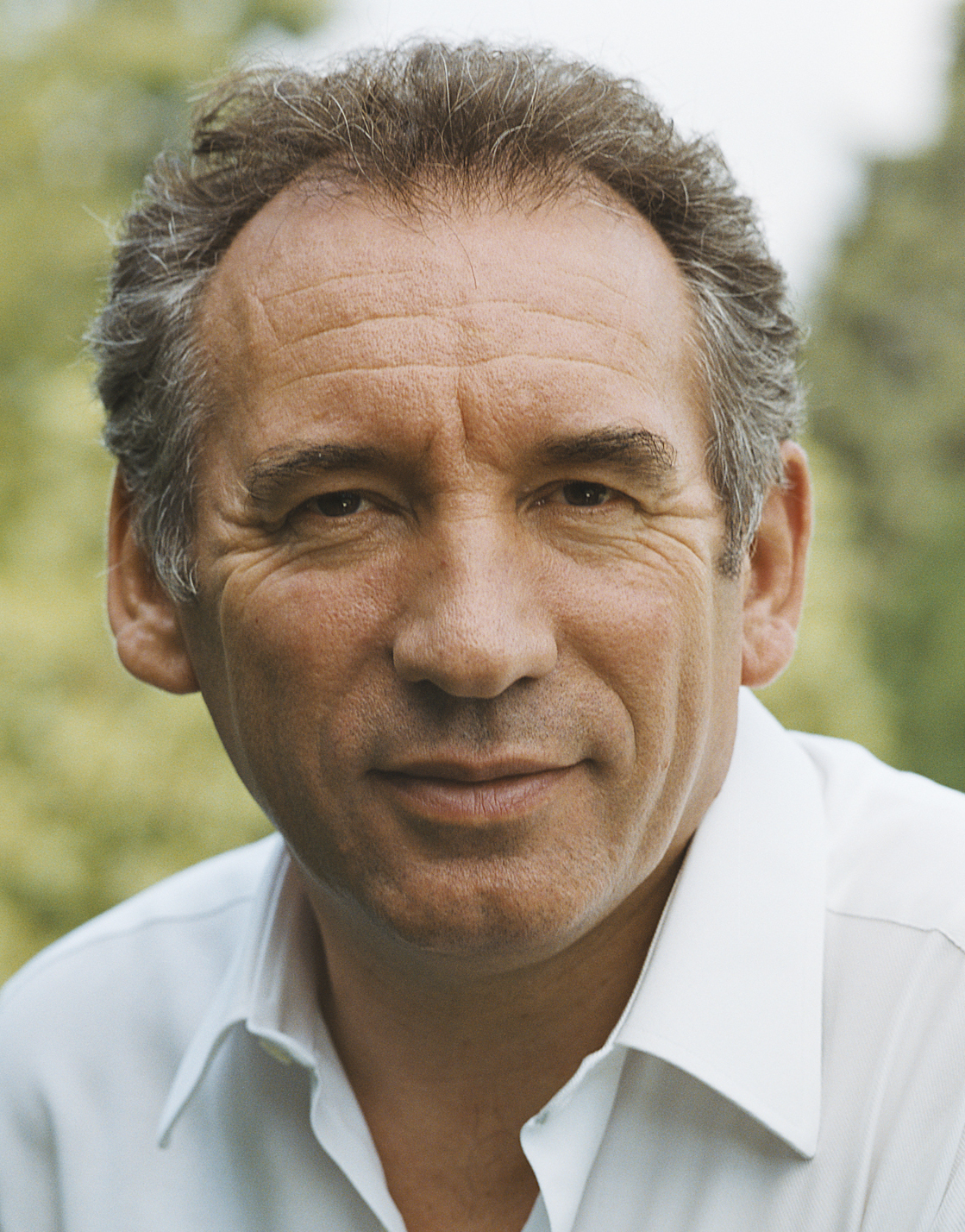
	First party	Second party	Third party
Leader	François Fillon	François Hollande	François Bayrou
Party	UMP	PS	MoDem
Leader since	17 May 2007	27 November 1997	2 December 2007
Leader's seat	Sarthe-4th	Corrèze-1st	Pyrénées-Atlantiques-2nd
Last election	357 seats, 33.3%	140 seats, 24.1%	29 seats, 4.9%
Seats won	313	186	3
Seat change	▼44	▲46	▼26
1st round % and swing	10,289,737; 39.54% ▲6.24%	6,436,520; 24.73% ▲0.62%	1,981,107; 7.61% ▲2.75%
2nd round % and swing	9,460,710; 46.36% ▼0.88%	8,624,861; 42.27% ▲7.01%	100,115; 0.49% ▼3.43%
Prime Minister before election
François Fillon
UMP
Elected Prime Minister
François Fillon
UMP

Legislative elections were held in France on 10 June and 17 June 2007 to elect the 13th National Assembly of the Fifth Republic, a few weeks after the presidential election run-off on 6 May. 7,639 candidates stood for 577 seats, including France's overseas possessions. Early first-round results projected a large majority for President Nicolas Sarkozy's Union for a Popular Movement (UMP) and its allies; however, second-round results showed a closer race and a stronger left. Nevertheless, the right retained its majority from 2002 despite losing some 40 seats to the Socialists.

Taking place so shortly after the presidential poll, these elections provided the newly elected president with a legislative majority in line with his political objectives – as was the case in 2002, when presidential victor Jacques Chirac's UMP party received a large majority in the legislative elections. It is the first time since the 1978 elections that the governing coalition has been returned after a second consecutive election. The majority, however, was slimmer than the "blue wave" predicted by opinion polls (blue being the colour of French conservatives).

== Election system ==
The procedure by which deputies are elected is a mixture of first past the post and run-off systems. A candidate must take an absolute majority (more than 50%) in their constituency to win in the first round, and receive the support of at least 25% of all registered voters. Otherwise, if they get at least 12.5% of the votes of all registered voters in the first round, or are one of the top two candidates remaining, they go through to the second round, where only a simple plurality is needed to win.

In most cases, there are only two candidates remaining for the second round: one left-wing (generally from the Socialist Party) and one right-wing (generally from the Union for a Popular Movement). Triangulaires happen when a third candidate reaches the second round and refuses to either abandon his candidacy or to enter any form of electoral alliance. In 2007, only one constituency experienced a triangulaire in the second round (in which Jean Lassalle, a MoDem candidate, was elected).

The Constitutional Council had beforehand warned the government of the necessity to renew the electoral map, as the 577 electoral districts are made on the basis of the 1982 census of the population (thus being 25 years late on the current spread-out of the population). Because of this miscorrelation between the electoral map and the geographical map of the population, a deputy would need only 5,000 votes to be elected in some districts (such as in Saint-Barthélemy) while it would need 180,000 votes in others (such as the Seine-Saint-Denis). The Constitutional Council noted that this contradicted article 6 of the 1789 Declaration of the Rights of Man and of the Citizen as well as articles 3 and 24 of the Constitution.

== Campaign ==
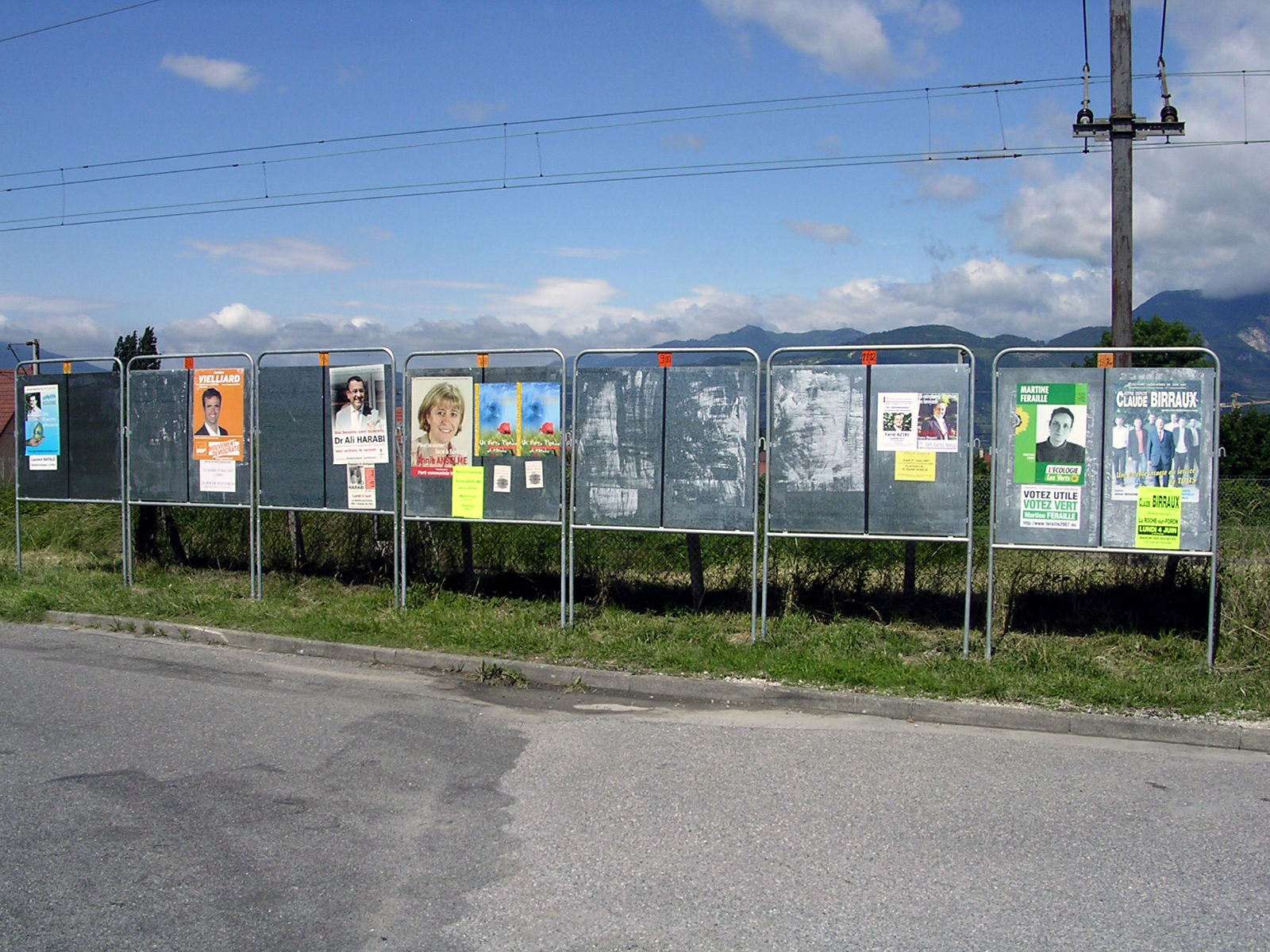
Electoral posters for the first round

Opinion polls and seat projections gave President Nicolas Sarkozy's UMP-led coalition a wide lead, sometimes nearing three-quarters of all 577 seats. The UMP polled marginally above 40%, around a 10-point increase over its score of 33% in the first round of the 2002 elections. Prime Minister François Fillon, also a candidate in Sarthe, led the UMP campaign. On the far-right, following Jean-Marie Le Pen's relatively low score in the presidential election, the National Front tried to regain lost ground in the legislative election, but opinion polls gave the FN only 4 or 5 per cent of votes, one of its lowest scores in a general election.

=== Socialist Party ===
The Socialist Party's defeated 2007 presidential candidate, Ségolène Royal, also campaigned on behalf of her party, even though she did not run for re-election as a deputy in Deux-Sèvres. The Socialists sought to prevent the UMP from winning too wide a majority that would give Sarkozy "full powers".

=== Union for French Democracy ===
Between the two rounds of the presidential election, the UDF leader François Bayrou had announced the creation of a new political party, the Democratic Movement (MoDem), and refused to continue the alliance between centrists and the UMP. This strategy was dangerous for the centrist MPs, one month before the legislative election. The ballot system for the election of the deputies favoured the coalitions to the detriment of the isolated parties. In this, contrary to Bayrou, the most part of the UDF deputies and senators called to vote for Nicolas Sarkozy in the second round of the presidential election, then joined the "Presidential Majority" and founded the New Centre. Incumbent president of the UDF group in the National Assembly, Hervé Morin, led this new political formation and was nominated Defense Minister. For the first time, François Bayrou was challenged by a right-wing candidate in his constituency.

Interest in one local election race surrounded Gérard Vignoble of the UDF, who had represented Roubaix since 1988. Vignoble announced that he would not stand again since this would put him against cardiologist Salem Kacet of the UMP, who had operated on him in 1999 and saved his life. The two candidates had become close friends. Vignoble said that it was impossible for him to come to any other decision. Nevertheless, Kacet still failed to take the seat, the winner being the Socialist Dominique Baert.

=== French Communist Party ===
The Communists hoped that their vote would hold up following their lowest percentage vote ever (1.93%) in the presidential race in May. While polls seemed unfriendly to the Communists, with some predicting less than 10 seats for the party, the second round's left surge prevented a massive Communist defeat. Although losing seats, they were able to gain or hold 15 seats. However, the PCF lost previously safe seats.

=== VAT polemic ===
During the electoral TV programme of the first round, the former Socialist Prime Minister Laurent Fabius called out to the Minister of Economy Jean-Louis Borloo about the project of a new VAT to finance the social security. Borloo confirmed it was examined by the government. This new tax was the main theme of campaign between the two rounds. It was criticized by the left because it could rise the prices for all the housekeepings. This project was perceived as contradictory to candidate Sarkozy's promise to be "President of the purchasing power". According to the former UMP Prime Minister Jean-Pierre Raffarin, in re-mobilizing the left-wing voters, this controversy caused the defeat of around 60 UMP candidates in the second round. In this, if the right stood majority, the left won 49 seats since 2002. Accused to be responsible of this result, Jean-Louis Borloo was nominated Minister of Ecology, replacing Alain Juppé, beaten in his constituency.

== Opinion polls ==
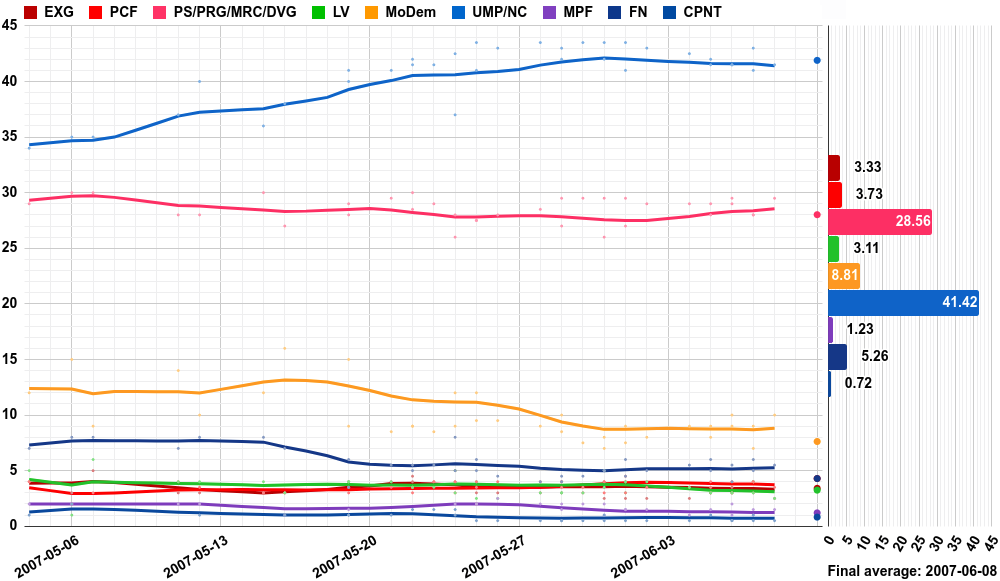

== Results ==
Contrary to the polls, the UMP lost ground, but it maintained a workable majority. The Socialists unexpectedly gained seats. Their plea to voters to prevent an overwhelming UMP dominance of the legislature appears to have paid off, providing the Socialists with a measure of redemption from the election loss. UDF splinter groups, François Bayrou's MoDem and the New Centre, contested their first elections. MoDem won 4 seats (including Mayotte regionalist Abdoulatifou Aly), while the New Centre was able to form a parliamentary group, with 22 seats. It remains to be seen whether Bayrou's party, which polled the third highest vote (7.61% in round one), will develop into a major political force. Their result is an improvement on the UDF's result of 4.9% in 2002. The National Front (FN) polled its lowest vote since its splash onto the political scene in 1986. The FN lost more than 60% of its support base since 2002. Support for the Communist Party also declined, and they saw a loss of several seats, whilst several other left-wing parties won nine new seats. The Greens gained one new seat, despite a fall in their vote. One of the most stunning results was the surprise defeat of UMP party leader Alain Juppé by the Socialist Party candidate Michèle Delaunay. Culture Minister Renaud Donnedieu de Vabres was defeated as well losing to Socialist Party candidate Jean-Patrick Gille. The far right did not win any seats.

Party	First round			Second round			Total seats
Party	Votes	%	Seats	Votes	%	Seats	Total seats
Union for a Popular Movement	10,289,737	39.54	98	9,460,710	46.36	215	313
Socialist Party	6,436,520	24.73	1	8,624,861	42.27	185	186
UDF–Democratic Movement	1,981,107	7.61	0	100,115	0.49	3	3
National Front	1,116,136	4.29	0	17,107	0.08	0	0
French Communist Party	1,115,663	4.29	0	464,739	2.28	15	15
Miscellaneous far-left	888,250	3.41	0				0
The Greens	845,977	3.25	0	90,975	0.45	4	4
Miscellaneous right	641,842	2.47	2	238,588	1.17	7	9
Presidential majority (Note: Including New Centre, which won 20 of the 22 seats.)	616,440	2.37	8	433,057	2.12	14	22
Miscellaneous left	513,407	1.97	0	503,556	2.47	15	15
Radical Party of the Left	343,565	1.32	0	333,194	1.63	7	7
Movement for France	312,581	1.20	1				1
Miscellaneous	267,760	1.03	0	33,068	0.16	1	1
Hunting, Fishing, Nature, Traditions	213,427	0.82	0				0
Ecologists	208,456	0.80	0				0
Regionalists and separatists (Note: Seat won by the Martinican Independence Movement)	133,473	0.51	0	106,484	0.52	1	1
Miscellaneous far-right	102,124	0.39	0				0
Total	26,026,465	100.00	110	20,406,454	100.00	467	577
Valid votes	26,026,465	98.13		20,406,454	96.58		
Invalid/blank votes	495,357	1.87		722,585	3.42		
Total votes	26,521,822	100.00		21,129,039	100.00		
Registered voters/turnout	43,895,833	60.42		35,225,248	59.98		
Source: Ministry of the Interior

=== Parliamentary groups in the National Assembly ===
Group	Leader	Parties	Seats	Caucusing	Total
UMP Group	Jean-François Cope	UMP, DVD	314	6	320
Socialist, Radical, and Citizen Group	Jean-Marc Ayrault	PS, PRG, DVG, MRC	186	18	204
Democratic and Republican Left group	Jean-Claude Sandrier	PCF, VEC, DVG, MIM	24	0	24
New Centre-Presidential Majority	François Sauvadet	NC-PSLE, MAJ, DVD	20	3	23
Non-inscrits		MoDem, DLR, MPF	6	0	6
Total			551	26	577

== See also ==
- List of deputies of the 13th National Assembly of France
