= Indre-et-Loire's 1st constituency =

Constituency of the National Assembly of France

1st constituency of Indre-et-Loire
- inline Constituency of the National Assembly of France

- Constituency in Department

- Location of Indre-et-Loire in France
- Deputy: Charles Fournier; LE
- Department: Indre-et-Loire
- Cantons: (pre-2015) Tours-1, Tours-2, Tours-3, Tours-4
- Registered voters: 71,139

The 1st constituency of Indre-et-Loire is one of five French legislative constituencies in the Indre-et-Loire département.

== Geography ==
The constituency is centred on the city of Tours.

== Deputies ==
Election	Member	Party
1958	Jean Royer	DVD
1962	Jean Royer	DVD
1967	Jean Royer	DVD
1968	Jean Royer	DVD
1973	Jean Royer	DVD
1978	Jean Royer	DVD
1981	Jean Royer	DVD
1986	Jean Royer	DVD
1988	Jean Royer	DVD
1993	Jean Royer	DVD
1997	Renaud Donnedieu de Vabres	UDF
2002	Renaud Donnedieu de Vabres	UMP
2007	Jean-Patrick Gille	PS
2012	Jean-Patrick Gille	PS
2017	Philippe Chalumeau	REM
2022	Charles Fournier	EELV
2024	Charles Fournier	LE

== Election results ==
=== 2024 ===
Candidate	Party	Alliance	First round			Second round		
Candidate	Party	Alliance	Votes	%	+/–	Votes	%	+/–
Charles Fournier	LE	NFP	21,250	45.32	+5.72	23,624	57.91	+4.41
Benoist Pierre	HOR	Ensemble	11,333	24.17	-3.21	17,169	42.09	-4.41
Lisa Garbay	RN		8,870	18.92	+9.59			
Lucas Janer	LR	UDC	2,774	5.92	-5.93			
Alain Dayan	DVG		1,690	3.60	new			
Arnaud Ossart	REC		496	1.06	-3.32			
Thomas Jouhannaud	LO		473	1.01	-0.18			
Votes			46,886	100.00		40,793	100.00	
Valid votes			46,886	98.28	-0.37	40,793	91.67	-3.28
Blank votes			565	1.18	+0.25	2,699	6.06	+2.61
Null votes			254	0.53	+0.12	1,010	2.27	+0.67
Turnout			47,705	66.29	+16.62	44,502	61.82	+13.53
Abstentions			24,259	33.71	-16.62	27,487	38.18	-13.53
Registered voters			71,964			71,989		
Result			LE HOLD					

=== 2022 ===
Legislative Election 2022: Indre-et-Loire's 1st constituency
Party	Candidate	Votes	%	±%
EELV (NUPÉS)	Charles Fournier	13,803	39.60	+3.69
LREM (Ensemble)	Philippe Chalumeau	9,545	27.38	-8.91
LR (UDC)	Olivier Lebreton	4,129	11.85	−1.25
RN	François Ducamp	3,251	9.33	+4.07
REC	Sophie de Lanouvelle	1,525	4.38	N/A
DVC	Inès Laurent	1,112	3.19	N/A
DVE	Bertrand Rouzier	577	1.66	N/A
PA	Stéphanie Moreau	500	1.43	N/A
Others	N/A	414	1.19	
Turnout		35,332	49.67	
2nd round result
EELV (NUPÉS)	Charles Fournier	17,461	53.51	+7.44
LREM (Ensemble)	Philippe Chalumeau	15,171	46.49	−7.44
Turnout		32,628	48.29	+7.69
EELV gain from LREM				

=== 2017 ===
Candidate	Label	First round		Second round	
Candidate	Label	Votes	%	Votes	%
Philippe Chalumeau	REM	12,149	36.29	13,548	53.93
Jean-Patrick Gille	PS	5,069	15.14	11,573	46.07
Claude Bourdin	FI	4,795	14.32		
Céline Ballesteros	LR	4,387	13.10		
Laurence Lecardonnel	FN	1,762	5.26		
Christophe Dupin	ECO	1,675	5.00		
Lionel Béjeau	DVD	837	2.50		
Bruno de Jorna	DVD	731	2.18		
Léonard Lema	PCF	486	1.45		
Emmanuel Lakière	DLF	476	1.42		
Mathilde Zicca	DIV	357	1.07		
Maria Loire	ECO	328	0.98		
Philippe Conte	DIV	227	0.68		
Anne Brunet	EXG	200	0.60		
Votes		33,479	100.00	25,121	100.00
Valid votes		33,479	98.63	25,121	90.16
Blank votes		321	0.95	1,990	7.14
Null votes		143	0.42	753	2.70
Turnout		33,943	49.46	27,864	40.60
Abstentions		34,690	50.54	40,769	59.40
Registered voters		68,633		68,633	
Source: Ministry of the Interior

=== 2012 ===
2012 legislative election in Indre-Et-Loire's 1st constituency
Candidate	Party	First round		Second round	
Candidate	Party	Votes	%	Votes	%
Jean-Patrick Gille	PS	14,835	41.69%	20,304	58.19%
Guillaume Peltier	UMP	10,197	28.65%	14,586	41.81%
Fabien-Emmanuel Poussard	FN	2,722	7.65%		
Josette Blanchet	FG	2,175	6.11%		
Caroline Larpent	EELV	1,679	4.72%		
Thibault Coulon		1,633	4.59%		
Fanny Siouville	MoDem	815	2.29%		
Christophe Bouchet	PR	577	1.62%		
Nathalie Cornet	AEI	261	0.73%		
Munia Ewanje Epee	NPA	254	0.71%		
Anne Brunet	LO	183	0.51%		
Jean-Jacques Rives	DLR	170	0.48%		
Julie Moreau	AR	61	0.17%		
Adrien Gaume	MOC	24	0.07%		
Valid votes		35,586	98.96%	34,890	96.95%
Spoilt and null votes		373	1.04%	1,099	3.05%
Votes cast / turnout		35,959	54.87%	35,989	54.91%
Abstentions		29,581	45.13%	29,551	45.09%
Registered voters		65,540	100.00%	65,540	100.00%

=== 2007 ===
Legislative Election 2007: Indre-et-Loire's 1st constituency
Party	Candidate	Votes	%	±%
UMP	Renaud Donnedieu de Vabres	12,163	38.13	−3.33
PS	Jean-Patrick Gille	10,171	31.89	−1.21
MoDem	Colette Girard	3,070	9.62	N/A
MPF	Guillaume Peltier	1,888	5.92	N/A
LV	Abderrahmane Marzouki	1,150	3.61	−1.50
LCR	Fanny Puel	1,020	3.20	+1.57
FN	Brigitte Moreau	842	2.64	−5.93
PCF	Pierre Texier	745	2.34	+0.19
Others	N/A	849	-	−
Turnout		32,199	59.04	−1.83
2nd round result
PS	Jean-Patrick Gille	15,826	51.07	+2.64
UMP	Renaud Donnedieu de Vabres	15,160	48.93	−2.64
Turnout		31,825	58.35	+1.01
PS gain from UMP				

=== 2002 ===
Legislative Election 2002: Indre-et-Loire's 1st constituency
Party	Candidate	Votes	%	±%
UMP	Renaud Donnedieu de Vabres	13,350	41.46	+23.50
PS	Jean-Patrick Gille	10,657	33.10	+5.24
FN	Jean Verdon	2,758	8.57	−3.59
LV	David Martin	1,645	5.11	+0.82
PCF	Marie-Pierre Cuvier	693	2.15	−2.64
Others	N/A	3,094	-	−
Turnout		32,726	60.87	−0.48
2nd round result
UMP	Renaud Donnedieu de Vabres	15,244	51.57	N/A
PS	Jean-Patrick Gille	14,315	48.43	−0.49
Turnout		30,829	57.34	−8.86
UMP gain from PR				

=== 1997 ===
Legislative Election 1997: Indre-et-Loire's 1st constituency
Party	Candidate	Votes	%	±%
PS	Jean-Patrick Gille	8,694	27.86	
PR (UDF)	Renaud Donnedieu de Vabres	6,470	20.73	
RPR	Michèle Beuzelin*	5,606	17.96	
FN	Jean Verdon	3,795	12.16	
PCF	Pierre Texier	1,496	4.79	
LV	Jean-Dominique Boutin	1,339	4.29	
LDI	Arnaud Roy	881	2.82	
GE	Claude Guillaumaud	877	2.81	
LO	Jean-Michel Hernandez	829	2.66	
Others	N/A	1,221	-	
Turnout		32,351	61.35	
2nd round result
PR (UDF)	Renaud Donnedieu de Vabres	16,998	51.08	
PS	Jean-Patrick Gille	16,280	48.92	
Turnout		34,910	66.20	
PR gain from DVD				

* RPR dissident
