= Philippe Chalumeau =

French politician (born 1963)

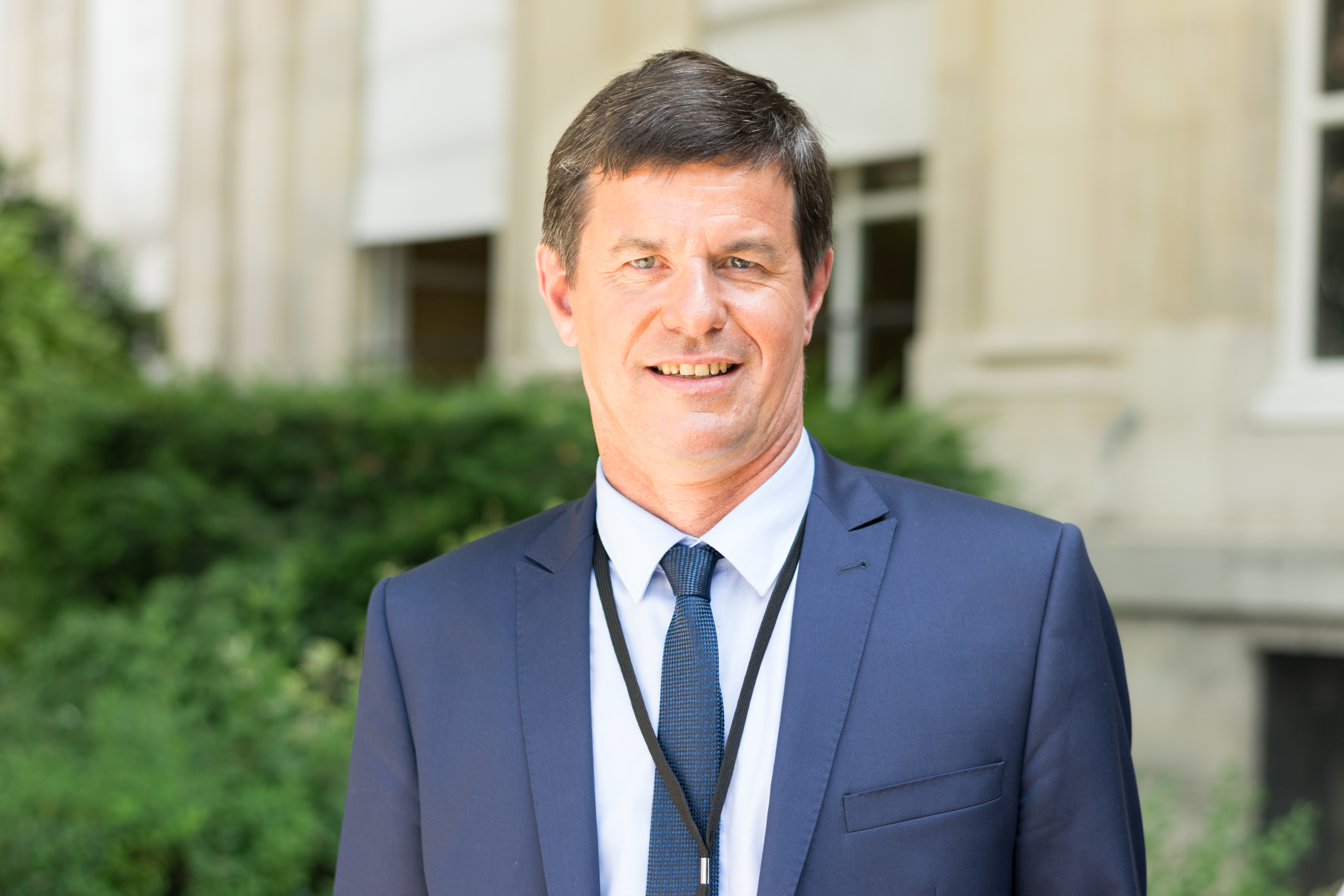

Member of the National Assembly for Indre-et-Loire's 1st constituency
- In office 18 June 2017 – 22 June 2022
- Preceded by: Jean-Patrick Gille (PS)
- Succeeded by: Charles Fournier

Personal details
- Born: 8 November 1963 (age 61)
- Political party: La République En Marche! (LREM)

Philippe Chalumeau (born 8 November 1963) is a French politician of La République En Marche! (LREM) who has been a member of the French National Assembly since the 2017 elections, representing Indre-et-Loire's 1st constituency.

== Political career ==
In parliament, Chalumeau serves on the Defense Committee, where he is his parliamentary group's coordinator. In addition to his committee assignments, he is a member of the French-Bolivian Parliamentary Friendship Group.

In the 2022 French legislative election she was unseated in the second round.

== Political positions ==
In July 2019, Chalumeau voted in favour of the French ratification of the European Union's Comprehensive Economic and Trade Agreement (CETA) with Canada.
