= Renaud Donnedieu de Vabres =

French politician

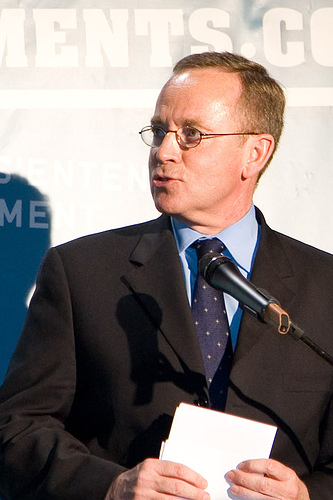
- Renaud Donnedieu de Vabres (2006)

Minister of Culture
- In office 31 March 2004 – 15 May 2007
- Prime Minister: Jean-Pierre Raffarin; Dominique de Villepin
- Preceded by: Jean-Jacques Aillagon
- Succeeded by: Christine Albanel

Personal details
- Born: 13 March 1954 (age 72) Neuilly-sur-Seine, France
- Party: UMP
- Education: Sciences Po, ÉNA

Renaud Donnedieu de Vabres (French pronunciation: [ʁəno dɔndjø də vabʁ]; born 13 March 1954 in Neuilly-sur-Seine), often known as RDDV, is a French politician, France's Minister of Culture from 2004 to 2007. He is a member of the UMP center-right party, and the grandson of Henri Donnedieu de Vabres.

== Biography ==
Renaud Donnedieu de Vabres has a degree in economics, and a diploma from the Paris Institute of Political Studies, a traditional starting point for attending the École nationale d'administration (ENA), a school for high-level civil servants, which he entered in 1978.

After graduating in 1980 from ENA, he started his career in the prefectoral administration as a sub-prefect, chief of staff of the Indre-et-Loire prefect, then was secretary-general for the police in the Centre region (1980–1981), secretary-general of the Alpes-de-Haute-Provence prefecture (1981–1982), sub-prefect of the Château-Thierry arrondissement (1982–1985).

== Political career ==
From 1986 to 2001 he was regional councillor in the Centre region, president of the UDF group and reporter for the budget (1986–1993).

He began his national political career as an aide to François Léotard when the latter was Minister of Culture (1987–1988) in the government of then prime minister Jacques Chirac, then as chief of staff in the Republican Party, then one of the components of the UDF. Starting from 1990, he became a member of the political bureau of the party, then delegate-general from 1995 to 1997.

From 1993 to 1995, he was an aide to François Léotard, Minister of Defence in the government of then prime minister Édouard Balladur. Within this role, he participated in the negotiation of an important sale of two anti-air frigates to Saudi Arabia by a company affiliated with the Ministry; the contract, for approximately 19 billion French francs, was signed on 19 November 1994. There were suspicions that this contract generated massive kickbacks for the funding of the Republican Party and, as a consequence, a complex judicial enquiry was started. Finally, on 16 February 2004, the correctional court of Paris convicted Renaud Donnedieu de Vabres of money laundering, with a €15,000 fine. He was not, however, deprived of the right to run for office.

During the 1995 presidential election, Renaud Donnedieu de Vabres was in the campaign team of Édouard Balladur. In March 2001, he was the right-wing candidate in the municipal election in Tours in March 2001, but he was beaten by the outgoing PS mayor, Jean Germain.

From 1997 to 2002 he was deputy to the National Assembly for the first constituency of Indre-et-Loire, from the UDF center-right party. In 1999, he voted against the PACS, a domestic partnership law aimed at enabling homosexuals to form legal couples. During the 2002 presidential election, he distanced himself from the UDF leader François Bayrou and supported Jacques Chirac's reelection bid. At the ensuing legislative election, he was reelected deputy.

On 7 May 2002, he was appointed delegate minister for European affairs in the government of Jean-Pierre Raffarin, a position that he quit in the 16 June cabinet reshuffle as a result of the announcement of the aforementioned criminal investigation in the financial affairs of the Republican Party. He became deputy secretary general of the UMP party, the party supporting Jacques Chirac, then spokesperson in 2003.

Despite his 16 February 2004, conviction, he was, on 31 March, appointed Minister of Culture and communication in the third cabinet of prime minister Jean-Pierre Raffarin, and was kept at this position on 2 June 2005, for the government of Dominique de Villepin.

In 2005, he rose to fame by defending the controversial DADVSI copyright bill before the French parliament, resulting in a variety of criticism against him from both the opposition and members of his own party. On this occasion, president of the National Assembly Jean-Louis Debré, a fellow UMP member, is reported to have declared that Donnedieu de Vabres was "a zero who put us in the shit and, from the start, dragged us into an adventure". Because of his staunch support for the law, he is the target of a campaign of Google bombing mapping ministre blanchisseur ("laundering minister") to a press article about his conviction.

Renaud Donnedieu de Vabres ran unsuccessfully in the 2007 legislative elections.

Governmental functions

Minister for European affairs : May–June 2002.

Minister of Culture and Communication : 2004-2007.

Electoral mandates

National Assembly of France

Member of the National Assembly of France for Indre-et-Loire : 1997-2002 (Became minister in 2002) / 2002-2004 (Became minister in 2004). Elected in 1997, reelected in 2002.

Regional Council

Vice-president of the Regional Council of Centre : 1992-1998.

Regional councillor of Centre : 1986-2001 (Resignation) : Reelected in 1992, 1998.

Municipal Council

Municipal councillor of Tours : Since 2001. Reelected in 2008.

Political offices
Preceded by Jean-Jacques Aillagon	Minister of Culture; 2004–2007	Succeeded by Christine Albanel
