= Christine Albanel =

French politician and civil servantborn (born 1955)

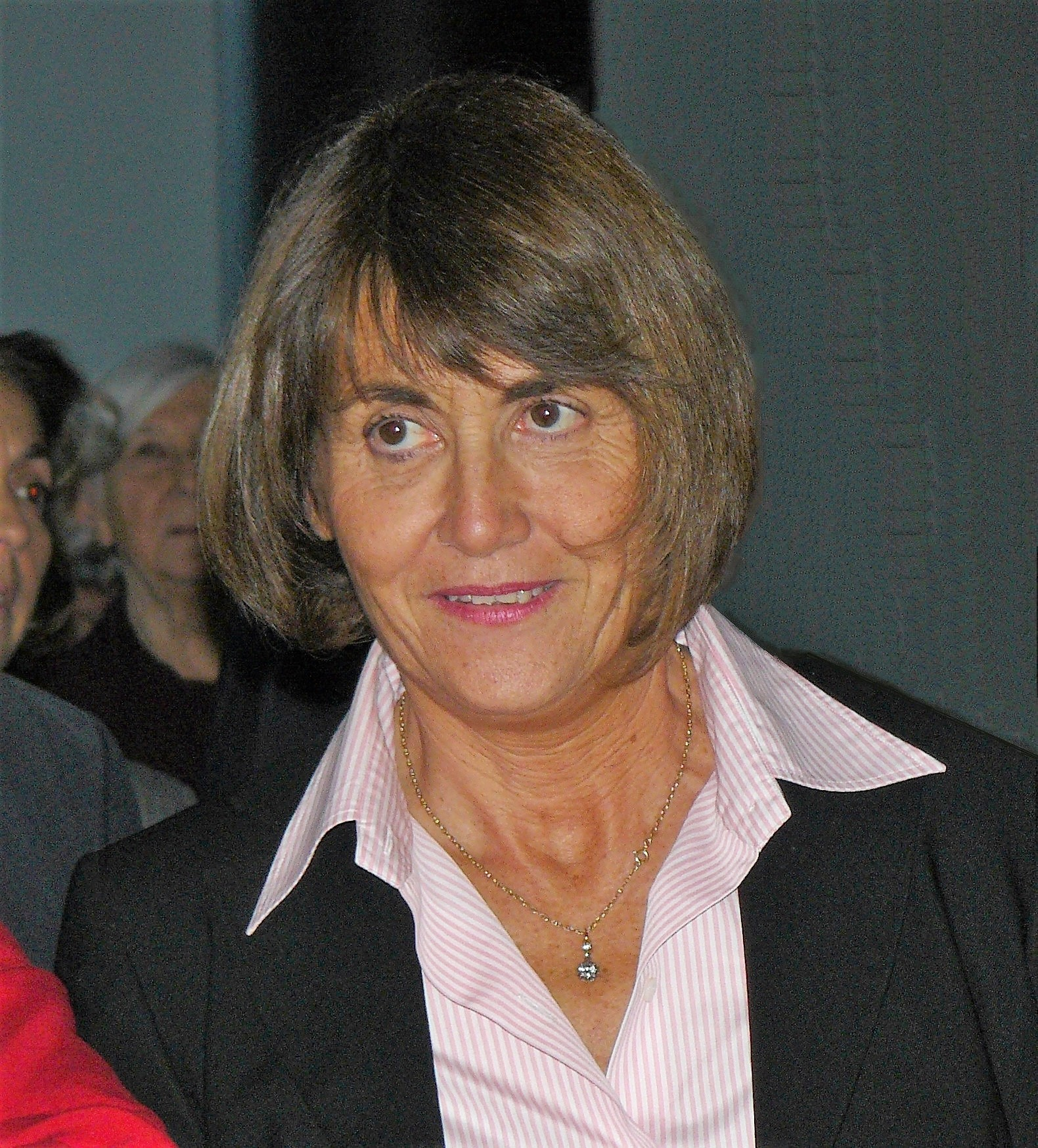
- Albanel in 2008

French Minister of Culture
- In office 18 May 2007 – 23 June 2009
- President: Nicolas Sarkozy
- Prime Minister: François Fillon
- Preceded by: Renaud Donnedieu de Vabres
- Succeeded by: Frédéric Mitterrand

Personal details
- Born: 25 June 1955 (age 71) Toulouse, France
- Party: UMP

Christine Albanel (French pronunciation: [kʁistin albanɛl]; born 25 June 1955) is a French politician and civil servant. From May 2007 to June 2009, she was France's Minister for Culture and Communication in François Fillon's government.

== Early career ==
Albanel is agrégé in classical Letters. In 1982, she joined the administration of the city of Paris, and followed Jacques Chirac – working in his cabinet – when he became Prime Minister in 1986 and French President in 1995.

In 2000, she became Conseiller d'État.

She became president of the museum and domain administration of the Palace of Versailles in 2003.

== Minister of Culture ==
In 2007, Albanel was appointed Minister of Culture in François Fillon's government.

During her time in office, Albanel proposed a new law (the HADOPI law) with the objective to reduce music and video piracy over the Internet, along the same 'graduated penalty' lines of thinking that previous ineffective 'DADVSI' law. This move generated debate as several Presumption of innocence key liberty and law principles were sacrificed for the sake of efficiency, while a number of experts in Internet technology said the attempt was anyway doomed as grossly underestimating the complexity of any reliable control system. As of 10 June 2009, the HADOPI law was struck down by the Constitutional Council of France.

In 2008, Sarkozy ordered Albanel to test free admission in certain museums for six months.

Also in 2008, Albanel launched a campaign to revive the country's art market through a battery of fiscal and financial incentives.

Lastly, Albanel is credited as a driving force behind the 2008 exhibition "Looking for Owners: Custody, Research and Restitution of Art Stolen in France During World War II" at the Israel Museum in Jerusalem.

== Life after politics ==
After leaving government, Albanel was appointed Executive Vice-President of multi-national telecommunications corporation Orange.

Under the leadership of Anne Levade, Albanel was part of the organizing committee of the Republicans' first-ever primary to select the party's candidate for the 2017 presidential election.

== Controversy ==
In early 2009, Albanel received an anonymous death threat accompanied by a 9mm-calibre bullet.

Political offices
Preceded by Renaud Donnedieu de Vabres	Minister of Culture; 2007–2009	Succeeded by Frédéric Mitterrand
