= David Guiraud =

French politician (born 1992)

- Guiraud in 2024

Mayor of Roubaix
- Incumbent
- Assumed office 27 March 2026
- Preceded by: Alexandre Garcin

Member of the National Assembly for Nord's 8th constituency
- In office 22 June 2022 – 7 April 2026
- Preceded by: Catherine Osson
- Succeeded by: Shéhérazade Bentorki

Personal details
- Born: 18 November 1992 (age 33) Paris, France
- Party: La France Insoumise (since 2017)
- Other political affiliations: New Popular Front; NUPES
- Occupation: Deputy of the National Assembly

David Guiraud (French pronunciation: [david ɡiʁo]; born 18 November 1992) is a French politician of La France Insoumise (LFI) who was elected to the National Assembly to represent the 8th constituency of the Nord department in the 2022 legislative election. He was re-elected during the 2024 legislative election. He was elected mayor of Roubaix during the 2026 French municipal elections.

== See also ==
- List of deputies of the 16th National Assembly of France
