= Charles Fournier =

French politician (born 1968)

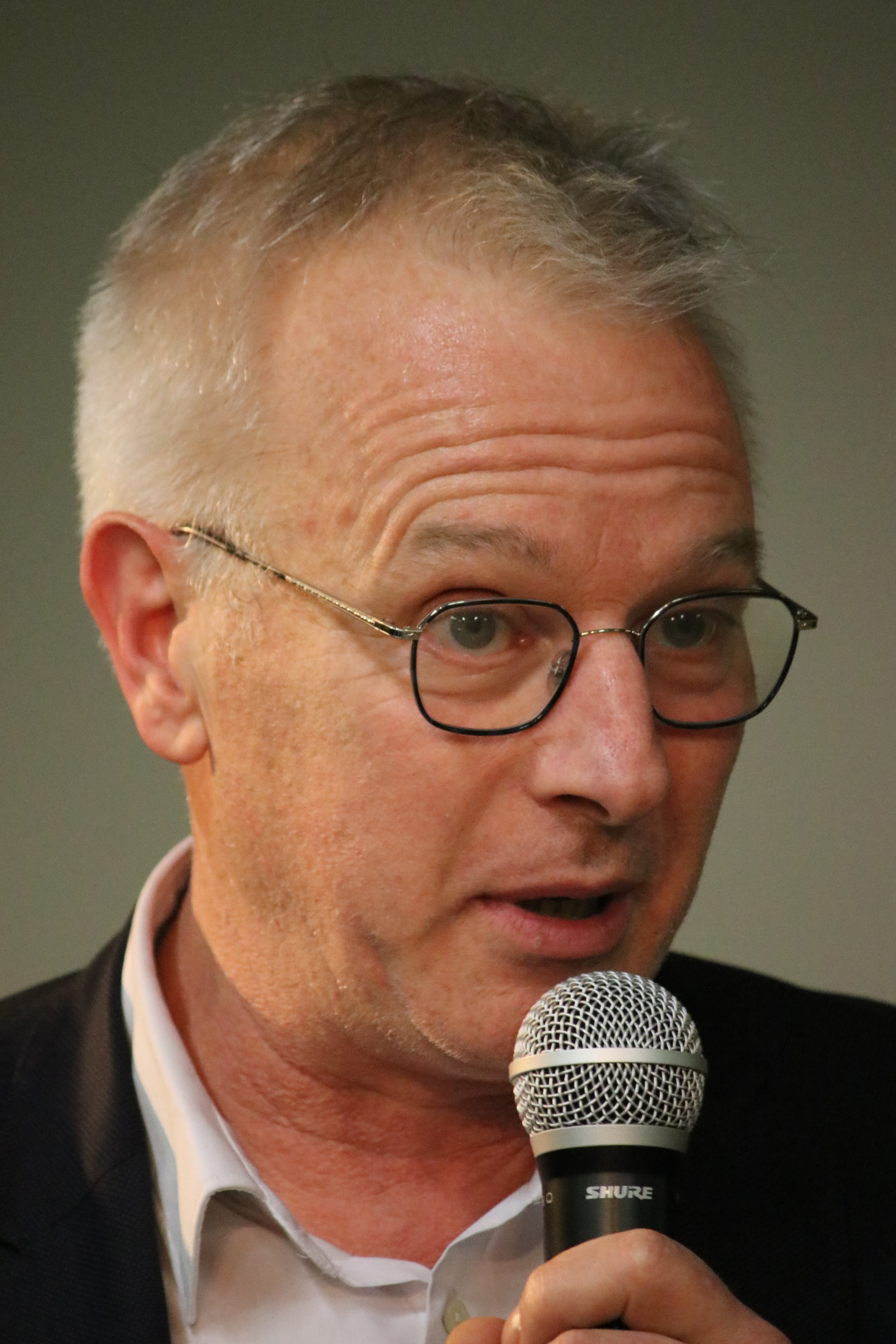
- Fournier in 2023

Member of the National Assembly for Indre-et-Loire's 1st constituency
- Incumbent
- Assumed office 22 June 2022
- Preceded by: Philippe Chalumeau

Personal details
- Born: Charles Fournier; 10 March 1968 (age 58) Romorantin-Lanthenay, Loir-et-Cher, France
- Party: Europe Ecology – The Greens
- Other political affiliations: NUPES
- Occupation: Consultant

Charles Fournier (born 10 March 1968) is a French politician. A member of the EELV, he was elected Member of Parliament for Indre-et-Loire's 1st constituency during the 2022 French legislative election.

== Biography ==
Fournier was born in Romorantin in Loir-et-Cher to an electrician father who became a physiotherapist and a mother who worked as a teacher. Charles Fournier continued his studies in regional planning and then geography in Tours. He is the father of two daughters and a trainer in a cooperative.

=== Political career ===
Fournier became politically involved during his studies in Tours, with an association for the defence of the unemployed.

He had his first electoral experience at the age of 30, running in the 1998 French regional elections on the “Social Emergency” list, from the unemployed workers' movement, in the regional elections in Tours. The list brings together less than 2% of the votes.

In the 2001 French municipal elections, he was a candidate for municipal elections in Tours. Shortly after, he joined the Greens for the presidential campaign of Noël Mamère in 2002. In 2010, he became EELV regional advisor then was re-elected in 2015 and 2021. During these last two elections, he was the “list leader” of the so-called environmentalist group. From July 2015 to December 2022, he is one of the vice-presidents of the Centre-Val de Loire region alongside the majority of François Bonneau (PS). At the regional council, he was mainly involved in the social and solidarity economy, community life, and democratic participation, climate and ecological transition. He campaigns to link ecology and social issues, believing that “the absence of ecology is a collective punishment and always first for the most vulnerable". In December 2022, Fournier resigned from his mandate as regional elected official.

Fournier lived the majority of his life in Tours before settling in Blois from 2008. He returned to Tours at the beginning of 2022 for personal reasons and is a candidate for the nomination of EELV for the legislative elections.

Fournier became the candidate designated by the New Ecological and Social People's Union in Indre-et-Loire's 1st constituency for the 2022 French legislative election. He topped the poll in the first round, with 39.6% of the votes cast, ahead of the incumbent MP Philippe Chalumeau who was running for the Ensemble group. In the second round, he won the seat with 53.51% of the votes casts. He resigned six months later from the regional council. Jérémie Godet replaced him as vice-president.

== See also ==
- List of deputies of the 16th National Assembly of France
