= Catherine Osson =

French politician

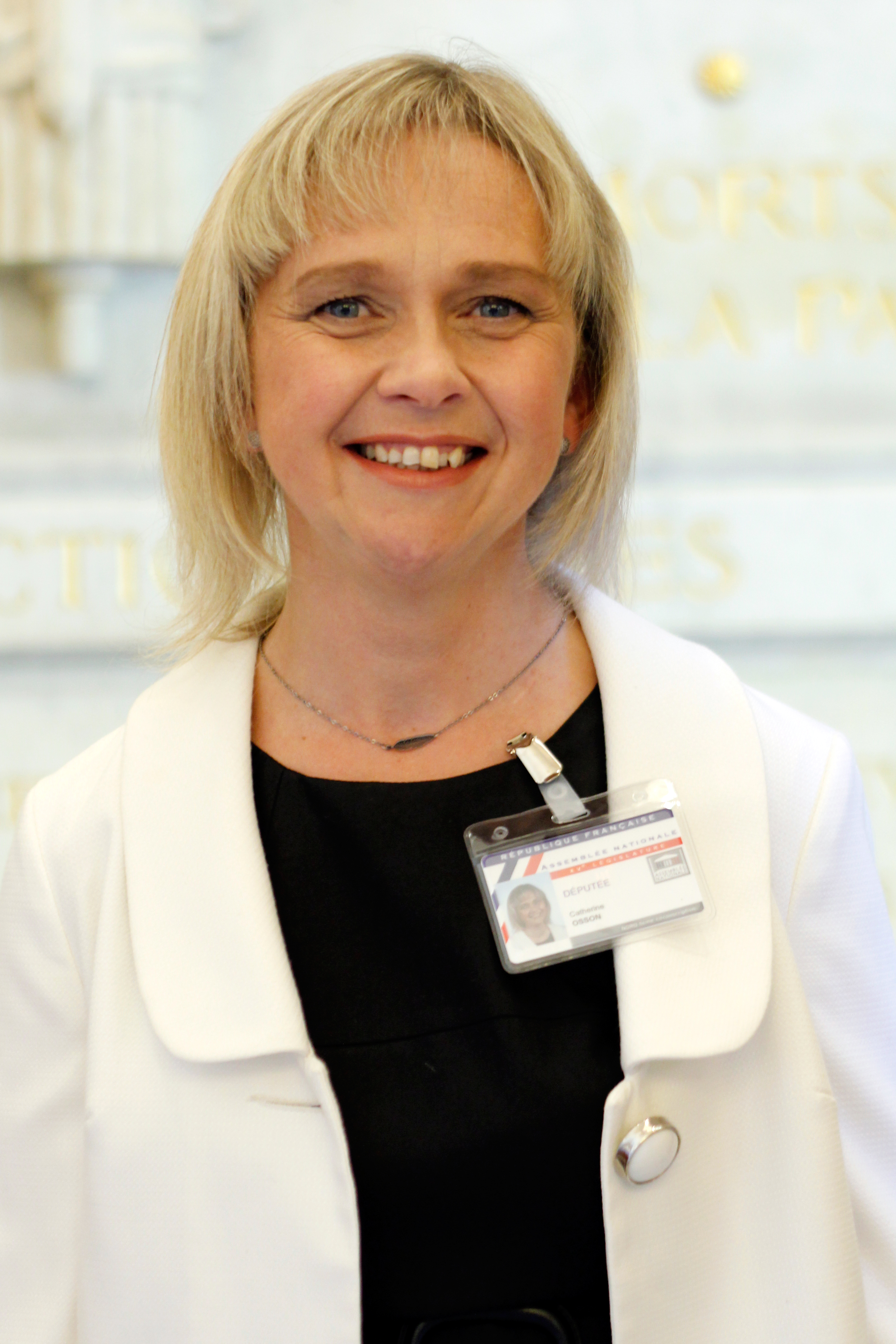

Member of the National Assembly for Nord's 8th constituency
- In office 21 June 2017 – 21 June 2022
- Preceded by: Dominique Baert
- Succeeded by: David Guiraud

Personal details
- Born: 7 February 1974 (age 52) Croix, Nord, France
- Party: La République En Marche

Catherine Osson (born 7 February 1974) is a French politician of La République en Marche! (LREM) who served as a member of the French National Assembly from 2017 to 2022, representing the department of Nord.

== Political career ==
In parliament, Osson serves as member of the Committee on Finance and Budgetary Control. In addition to her committee assignments, she is a member of the French-Belgian Parliamentary Friendship Group. Since 2019, she has also been a member of the French delegation to the Franco-German Parliamentary Assembly.

In 2020, Osson joined En commun (EC), a group within LREM led by Barbara Pompili.

She lost her seat in the second round of the 2022 French legislative election to David Guiraud from La France Insoumise.

== Political positions ==
In July 2019, Osson voted in favour of the French ratification of the European Union’s Comprehensive Economic and Trade Agreement (CETA) with Canada.

== See also ==
- 2017 French legislative election
