= Gérard Vignoble =

French technician and politician (1945–2022)

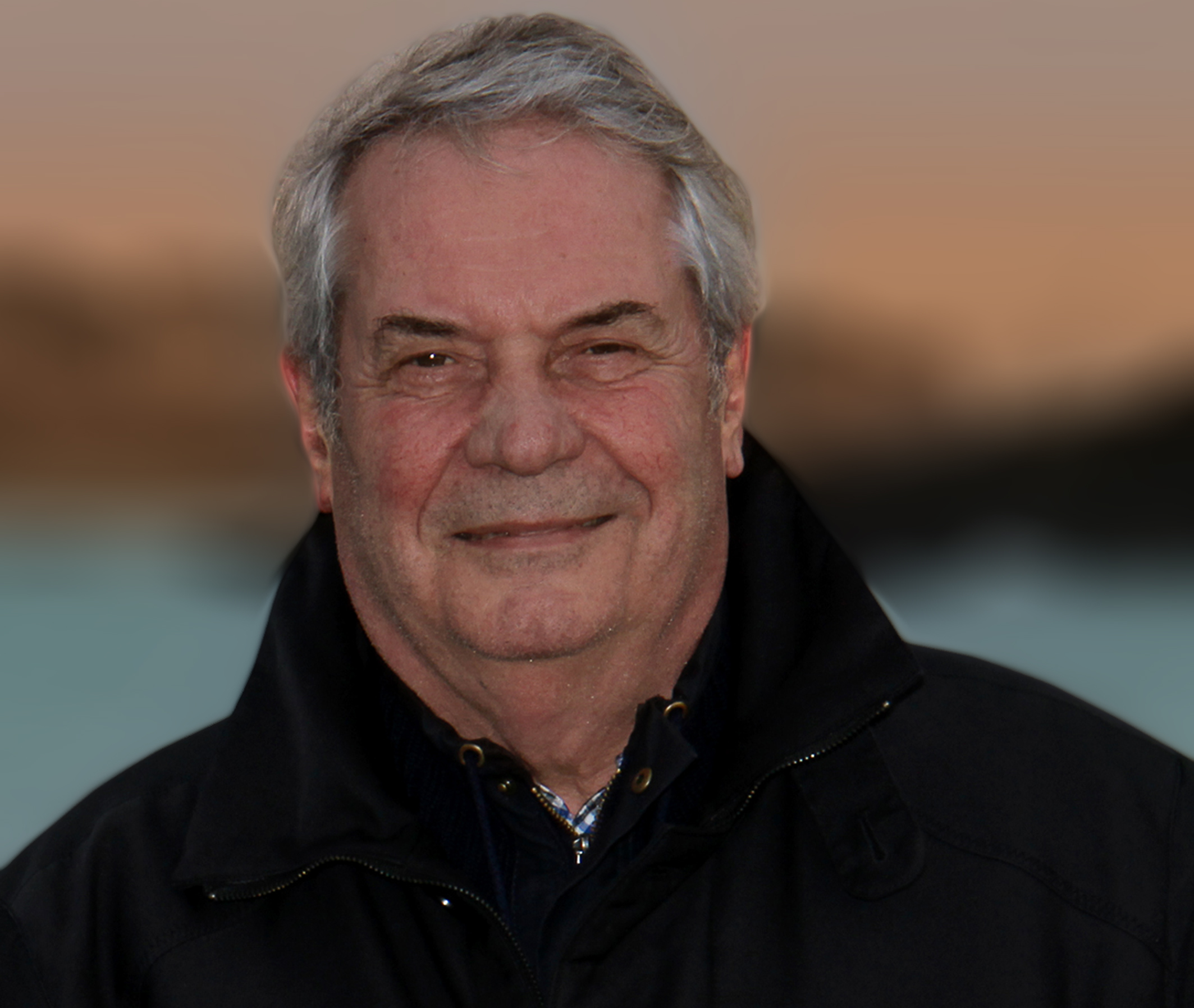
- Vignoble in 2012

Member of the French National Assembly
- In office 21 June 2002 – 22 June 2007
- Preceded by: Dominique Baert
- Succeeded by: Dominique Baert
- Constituency: Nord's 8th constituency
- In office 17 June 1988 – 6 June 1997
- Preceded by: Alain Faugaret
- Succeeded by: Dominique Baert
- Constituency: Nord's 8th constituency

Mayor of Wasquehal
- In office 25 March 1977 – 4 April 2014
- Preceded by: Pierre Herman
- Succeeded by: Stéphanie Ducret

Personal details
- Born: Gérard Antoine Gaston Vignoble; 29 October 1945 Roubaix, France
- Died: 22 August 2022 (aged 76) Dinard, France
- Party: PS (1977–1988); CDS (1988–2007); MoDem (2007–2009); NC (since 2009)
- Occupation: Technician

Gérard Antoine Gaston Vignoble (29 October 1945 – 22 August 2022) was a French politician. A member of the Centre of Social Democrats, he served in the National Assembly from 1988 to 1997 and again from 2002 to 2007.

Gérard Vignoble died in Dinard, at the age of 76.
