= Dominique Baert =

French politician

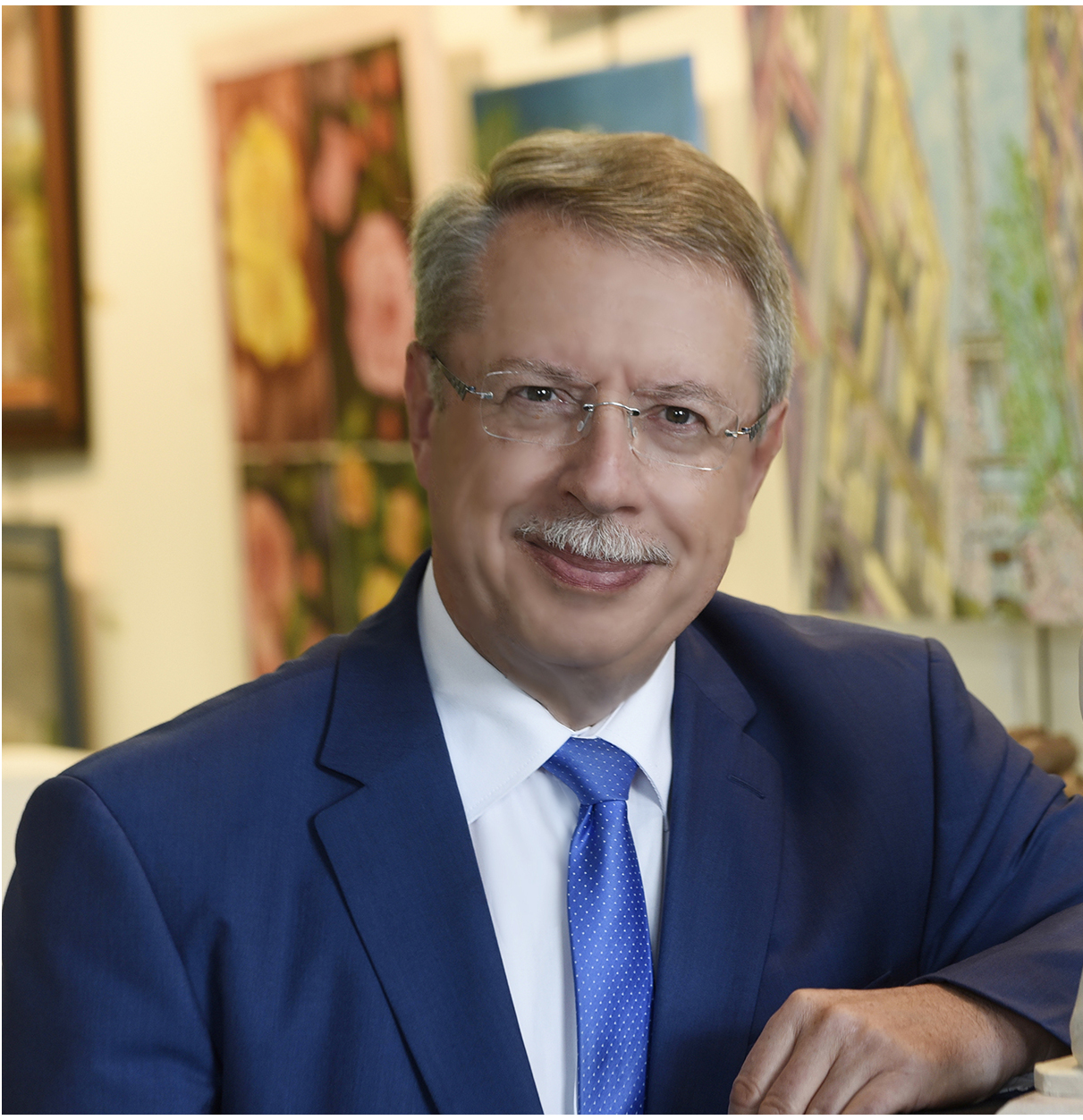
- Dominique Baert in 2016

Mayor of Wattrelos
- Incumbent
- Assumed office 10 May 2000
- Preceded by: Alain Faugaret

Member of the National Assembly for Nord's 8th constituency
- In office 20 June 2007 – 20 June 2017
- Preceded by: Gérard Vignoble
- Succeeded by: Catherine Osson

Personal details
- Born: 24 October 1959 (age 66) Tourcoing, France
- Party: Socialist Party
- Education: Lille University of Science and Technology; Sciences Po

Dominique Baert (born 24 October 1959) is a French politician who served as a member of the National Assembly, representing the Nord department. He is a member of the Socialist Party (Parti Socialiste) and works in association with the SRC parliamentary group.

In 2019, Baert publicly declared his support for incumbent President Emmanuel Macron.
