= Jean-Patrick Gille =

French politician

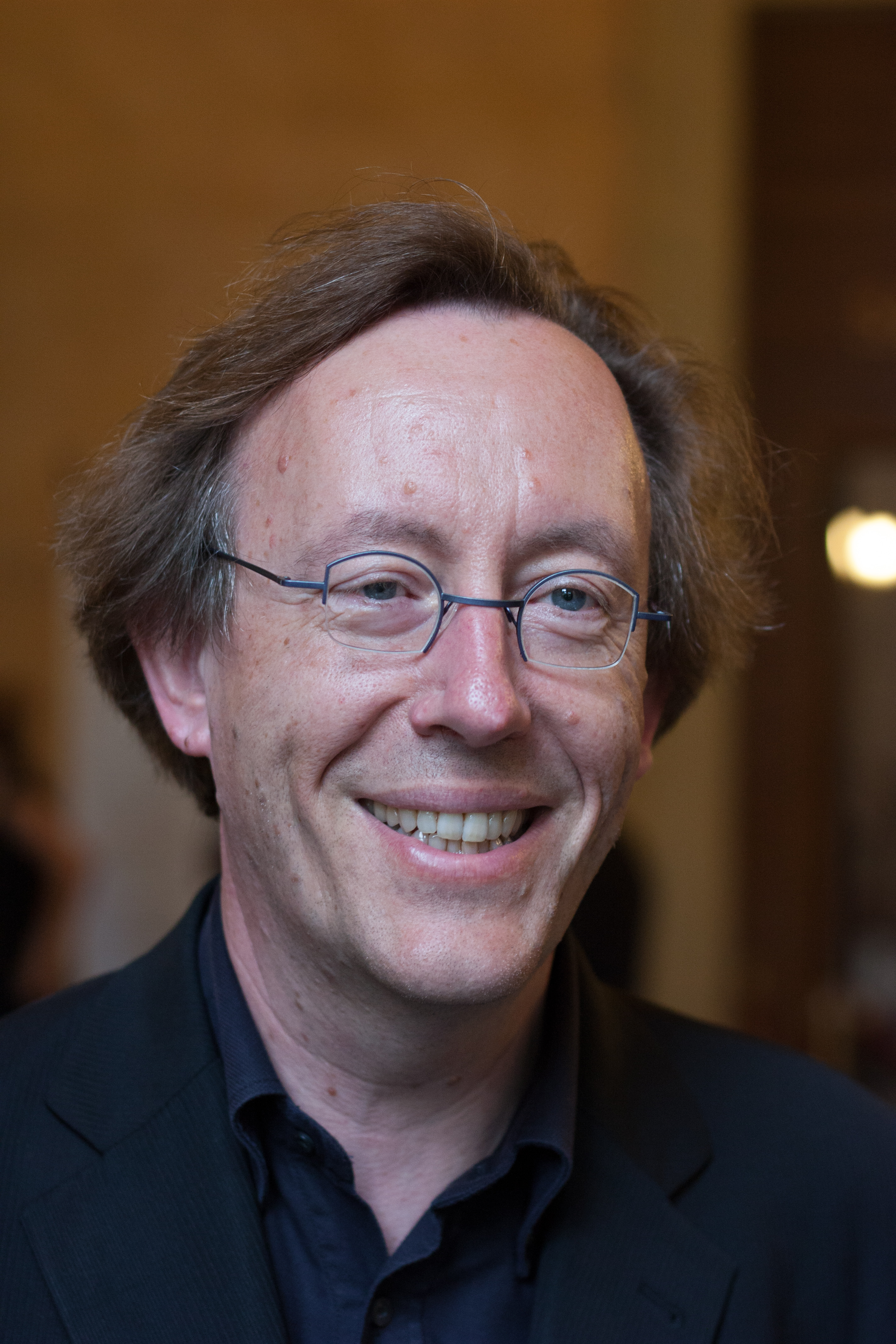
Jean-Patrick Gille, member of the National Assembly of France(2007 - 2017)

Jean-Patrick Gille (born 28 January 1962) was a member of the National Assembly of France from 2007 to 2017. He represented the 1st constituency of the Indre-et-Loire department, as a member of the Socialiste, radical, citoyen et divers gauche.
