= List of deputies not running for re-election in the 2017 French legislative election =

Deputies not running for re-election in the 2017 French legislative election
- 11 & 18 June 2017

The following is a list of deputies who stood down at the 2017 French legislative election.

== List ==
List of deputies who announced they would not stand for reelection in 2017
Deputy	Seat	First elected	Party	Date announced	Ref.
Bernard Accoyer	Haute-Savoie's 1st constituency	1993	LR		
Jean-Pierre Allossery	Nord's 15th constituency	2012	PS		
Pouria Amirshahi	9th French legislative constituency for citizens abroad	2012	DVG		
Benoist Apparu	Marne's 4th constituency	2012	LR	4 April 2017	
Nathalie Appéré	Ille-et-Vilaine's 2nd constituency	2012	PS		
François Asensi	Seine-Saint-Denis's 11th constituency	1978	FG	10 January 2017	
Danielle Auroi	Puy-de-Dôme's 3rd constituency	2012	EELV		
Pierre Aylagas	Pyrénées-Orientales's 4th constituency	2012	PS		
Jean-Paul Bacquet	Puy-de-Dôme's 4th constituency	1997	PS		
Dominique Baert	Nord's 8th constituency	2007	PS		
Patrick Balkany	Hauts-de-Seine's 5th constituency	2002	LR	28 June 2016	
Guy Bailliart	Calvados's 3rd constituency	2015	PS		
Alain Ballay	Corrèze's 1st constituency	2016	DVG		
Jean-Pierre Barbier	Isère's 7th constituency	2012	LR		
Claude Bartolone	Seine-Saint-Denis's 9th constituency	1981	PS	22 February 2017	
Denis Baupin	Paris's 10th constituency	2012	DVG	8 December 2016	
Nicolas Bays	Pas-de-Calais's 12th constituency	2012	PS		
Jean-Marie Beffara	Indre-et-Loire's 3rd constituency	2012	PS		
Jacques-Alain Bénisti	Val-de-Marne's 4th constituency	2002	LR	10 January 2017	
Sylvain Berrios	Val-de-Marne's 1st constituency	2012	LR	11 May 2017	
Véronique Besse	Vendée's 4th constituency	2005	MPF		
Jean-Pierre Blazy	Val-d'Oise's 9th constituency	2012	PS		
Alain Bocquet	Nord's 20th constituency	1978	PCF		
Daniel Boisserie	Haute-Vienne's 2nd constituency	1997	PS		
Michèle Bonneton	Isère's 9th constituency	2012	EELV	11 February 2017	
Marcel Bonnot	Doubs's 3rd constituency	2002	LR		
Marie-Odile Bouillé	Loire-Atlantique's 8th constituency	2008	PS		
Gilles Bourdouleix	Maine-et-Loire's 5th constituency	2002	CNIP		
Émeric Bréhier	Seine-et-Marne's 10th constituency	2012	PS		
Philippe Briand	Indre-et-Loire's 5th constituency	1993	LR		
Vincent Burroni	Bouches-du-Rhône's 12th constituency	1998	PS		
Dominique Bussereau	Charente-Maritime's 4th constituency	2010	LR		
Alain Calmette	Cantal's 1st constituency	2012	PS		
Jean-Jacques Candelier	Nord's 16th constituency	2007	PCF		
Christophe Caresche	Paris's 18th constituency	1997	PS		
Marie-Arlette Carlotti	Bouches-du-Rhône's 5th constituency	2012	PS		
Jean-Noël Carpentier	Val-d'Oise's 3rd constituency	2012	MDP		
Olivier Carré	Loiret's 1st constituency	2007	LR		
Martine Carrillon-Couvreur	Nièvre's 1st constituency	2002	PS		
Laurent Cathala	Val-de-Marne's 2nd constituency	1981	PS		
Ary Chalus	Guadeloupe's 3rd constituency	2012	GUSR		
Guy Chambefort	Allier's 1st constituency	2007	PS		
Gérard Charasse	Allier's 3rd constituency	1997	PRG		
Gaby Charroux	Bouches-du-Rhône's 13th constituency	2012	PCF		
Luc Chatel	Haute-Marne's 1st constituency	2002	LR		
Guy-Michel Chauveau	Sarthe's 3rd constituency	1981	DVG		
Dominique Chauvel	Seine-Maritime's 10th constituency	2012	PS		
Alain Chrétien	Haute-Saône's 1st constituency	2012	LR		
Jean-Louis Christ	Haut-Rhin's 2nd constituency	2002	LR		
Alain Claeys	Vienne's 1st constituency	1997	PS		
Stéphane Claireaux	Saint Pierre and Miquelon's 1st constituency	2014	PRG		
Marie-Françoise Clergeau	Loire-Atlantique's 2nd constituency	1997	PS		
David Comet	Charente's 1st constituency	2015	PS		
Jean-François Copé	Seine-et-Marne's 6th constituency	2002	LR		
Édouard Courtial	Oise's 7th constituency	2002	LR		
Catherine Coutelle	Vienne's 2nd constituency	2007	PS		
Jean-Michel Couve	Var's 4th constituency	1986	LR		
Jacques Cresta	Pyrénées-Orientales's 1st constituency	2012	PS		
Pascale Crozon	Rhône's 6th constituency	2007	PS		
Frédéric Cuvillier	Pas-de-Calais's 5th constituency	2007	PS		
Marc-Philippe Daubresse	Nord's 4th constituency	1992	LR		
Bernard Debré	Paris's 4th constituency	2004	LR		
Jean-Pierre Decool	Nord's 14th constituency	2002	LR		
Laurent Degallaix	Nord's 21st constituency	2014	UDI		
Lucien Degauchy	Oise's 5th constituency	1993	LR		
Pascal Deguilhem	Dordogne's 1st constituency	2007	PS		
Rémi Delatte	Côte-d'Or's 2nd constituency	2007	PS		
Florence Delaunay	Landes's 1st constituency	2014	PS		
Guy Delcourt	Pas-de-Calais's 3rd constituency	2007	PS		
Carole Delga	Haute-Garonne's 8th constituency	2012	PS		
Jacques Dellerie	Seine-Maritime's 9th constituency	2007	PS		
Pascal Demarthe	Somme's 1st constituency	2016	PS		
Jean-Louis Destans	Eure's 2nd constituency	2012	PS		
Patrick Devedjian	Hauts-de-Seine's 13th constituency	2010	LR		
Marc Dolez	Nord's 17th constituency	1997	DVG		
René Dosière	Aisne's 1st constituency	1997	App. PS		
Sandrine Doucet	Gironde's 1st constituency	2012	PS		
Jean-Pierre Dufau	Landes's 2nd constituency	1997	PS		
William Dumas	Gard's 5th constituency	2004	PS		
Jean-Paul Dupré	Aude's 3rd constituency	1997	PS		
Yves Durand	Nord's 11th constituency	1988	PS		
Philippe Duron	Calvados's 1st constituency	1997	PS		
Martine Faure	Gironde's 12th constituency	2007	PS		
François Fillon	Paris's 2nd constituency	1981	LR		
Geneviève Fioraso	Isère's 1st constituency	2007	PS		
Marie-Louise Fort	Yonne's 3rd constituency	2007	LR		
Jean-Marc Fournel	Meurthe-et-Moselle's 3rd constituency	2012	PS		
Michèle Fournier-Armand	Vaucluse's 1st constituency	2012	PS		
Marc Francina	Haute-Savoie's 5th constituency	2002	LR		
Jacqueline Fraysse	Hauts-de-Seine's 4th constituency	1978	FG		
Jean-Christophe Fromantin	Hauts-de-Seine's 6th constituency	2012	DVD		
Yves Fromion	Cher's 1st constituency	1997	LR		
Jean-Claude Fruteau	Réunion's 5th constituency	2007	PS		
Jean-Louis Gagnaire	Loire's 2nd constituency	2007	PS		
Geneviève Gaillard	Deux-Sèvres's 1st constituency	1997	PS		
Hervé Gaymard	Savoie's 2nd constituency	1993	LR		
Alain Gest	Somme's 4th constituency	1993	LR		
Paul Giacobbi	Haute-Corse's 2nd constituency	2002	DVG		
Daniel Gibbs	Saint-Barthélemy and Saint-Martin's 1st constituency	2012	LR		
Franck Gilard	Eure's 5th constituency	2002	LR		
Georges Ginesta	Var's 5th constituency	2002	LR		
Charles Ange Ginésy	Alpes-Maritimes's 2nd constituency	2005	LR		
Jean-Pierre Giran	Var's 3rd constituency	1997	LR		
Yves Goasdoué	Orne's 3rd constituency	2012	DVG		
Jean-Pierre Gorges	Eure-et-Loir's 1st constituency	2002	LR		
Geneviève Gosselin-Fleury	Manche's 4th constituency	2012	PS		
Marc Goua	Maine-et-Loire's 2nd constituency	2007	PS		
Laurent Grandguillaume	Côte-d'Or's 1st constituency	2012	PS		
Jean Grellier	Deux-Sèvres's 3rd constituency	2007	PS		
Arlette Grosskost	Haut-Rhin's 5th constituency	2002	LR		
Édith Gueugneau	Saône-et-Loire's 2nd constituency	2012	DVG		
Jean-Claude Guibal	Alpes-Maritimes's 4th constituency	1997	LR		
Jean-Jacques Guillet	Hauts-de-Seine's 8th constituency	1993	LR		
Christophe Guilloteau	Rhône's 10th constituency	2003	LR		
Michel Heinrich	Vosges's 1st constituency	2002	LR		
Gilda Hobert	Rhône's 1st constituency	2014	PRG		
Philippe Houillon	Val-d'Oise's 1st constituency	1993	LR		
Françoise Imbert	Haute-Garonne's 5th constituency	1997	PS		
Michel Issindou	Isère's 2nd constituency	2007	PS		
Denis Jacquat	Moselle's 2nd constituency	1986	LR		
Éric Jalton	Guadeloupe's 1st constituency	2002	App. PS		
Serge Janquin	Pas-de-Calais's 10th constituency	1993	PS		
Romain Joron	Somme's 2nd constituency	2012	PS		
Laurent Kalinowski	Moselle's 6th constituency	2012	PS		
Jacques Kossowski	Hauts-de-Seine's 3rd constituency	1997	LR		
Patrick Labaune	Drôme's 1st constituency	2002	LR		
Conchita Lacuey	Gironde's 4th constituency	1997	PS		
Marc Laffineur	Maine-et-Loire's 7th constituency	1988	LR		
Sonia Lagarde	New Caledonia's 1st constituency	2012	CE		
Jacques Lamblin	Meurthe-et-Moselle's 4th constituency	2007	LR		
Jean Launay	Lot's 2nd constituency	1998	PS		
Marylise Lebranchu	Finistère's 4th constituency	1997	PS		
Jean-Yves Le Bouillonnec	Val-de-Marne's 11th constituency	2002	PS		
Patrick Lebreton	Réunion's 4th constituency	2007	PS		
Gilbert Le Bris	Finistère's 8th constituency	1981	PS		
Jean-Yves Le Déaut	Meurthe-et-Moselle's 6th constituency	1986	PS		
Michel Lefait	Pas-de-Calais's 8th constituency	1997	PS		
Pierre Lellouche	Paris's 1st constituency	1993	LR		
Annick Le Loch	Finistère's 7th constituency	2007	PS		
Patrick Lemasle	Haute-Garonne's 7th constituency	1997	PS		
Dominique Le Mèner	Sarthe's 5th constituency	2002	LR		
Jean Leonetti	Alpes-Maritimes's 7th constituency	1997	LR		
Pierre Lequiller	Yvelines's 4th constituency	1988	LR		
Jean-Pierre Le Roch	Morbihan's 3rd constituency	2012	PS		
Bruno Le Roux	Seine-Saint-Denis's 1st constituency	1997	PS		
Arnaud Leroy	5th French legislative constituency for citizens abroad	2012	PS		
Marie-Thérèse Le Roy	Finistère's 1st constituency	2012	PS		
Bernard Lesterlin	Allier's 2nd constituency	2007	DVG		
Michel Liebgott	Moselle's 8th constituency	1997	PS		
Martine Lignières-Cassou	Pyrénées-Atlantiques's 1st constituency	1997	PS		
François Loncle	Eure's 4th constituency	1981	PS		
Gabrielle Louis-Carabin	Guadeloupe's 2nd constituency	2002	DVG		
Lionnel Luca	Alpes-Maritimes's 6th constituency	1997	LR		
Victorin Lurel	Guadeloupe's 4th constituency	2002	PS		
Jean-Pierre Maggi	Bouches-du-Rhône's 8th constituency	2012	PS		
Noël Mamère	Gironde's 3rd constituency	1997	DVG		
Jean-François Mancel	Oise's 2nd constituency	1978	LR		
Laurent Marcangeli	Corse-du-Sud's 1st constituency	2012	LR		
Marie-Lou Marcel	Aveyron's 2nd constituency	2007	PS		
Marion Maréchal-Le Pen	Vaucluse's 3rd constituency	2012	FN		
Alfred Marie-Jeanne	Martinique's 1st constituency	1997	MIM		
Hervé Mariton	Drôme's 3rd constituency	1993	LR		
Alain Marleix	Cantal's 2nd constituency	1993	LR		
Jean-René Marsac	Ille-et-Vilaine's 4th constituency	2007	PS		
Philippe Martin	Gers's 1st constituency	2002	PS		
Philippe Martin	Marne's 3rd constituency	1993	LR		
Patrice Martin-Lalande	Loir-et-Cher's 2nd constituency	1993	LR		
Alain Marty	Moselle's 4th constituency	2002	LR		
Frédérique Massat	Ariège's 1st constituency	2007	PS		
Jean-Claude Mathis	Aube's 2nd constituency	2002	LR		
François de Mazières	Yvelines's 1st constituency	2012	LR		
Damien Meslot	Territoire de Belfort's 1st constituency	2002	LR		
Kléber Mesquida	Hérault's 5th constituency	2002	PS		
Jean-Claude Mignon	Seine-et-Marne's 1st constituency	1988	LR		
Yannick Moreau	Vendée's 3rd constituency	2012	LR		
Pierre-Alain Muet	Rhône's 2nd constituency	2007	PS		
Philippe Naillet	Réunion's 1st constituency	2012	PS		
Yves Nicolin	Loire's 5th constituency	1993	LR		
Nathalie Nieson	Drôme's 4th constituency	2012	PS		
Robert Olive	Pyrénées-Orientales's 3rd constituency	2012	PS		
Patrick Ollier	Hauts-de-Seine's 7th constituency	1988	LR		
Michel Pajon	Seine-Saint-Denis's 3rd constituency	1996	PS		
Germinal Peiro	Dordogne's 4th constituency	1997	PS		
Jacques Pélissard	Jura's 1st constituency	1993	LR		
Édouard Philippe	Seine-Maritime's 7th constituency	2007	LR		
Sébastien Pietrasanta	Hauts-de-Seine's 2nd constituency	2012	PS		
Michel Piron	Maine-et-Loire's 4th constituency	2002	UDI		
Philippe Plisson	Gironde's 11th constituency	2007	PS		
Josette Pons	Var's 6th constituency	2002	LR		
Pascal Popelin	Seine-Saint-Denis's 12th constituency	2012	PS		
Régine Povéda	Lot-et-Garonne's 2nd constituency	2012	PS		
Patrice Prat	Gard's 3rd constituency	2012	DVG		
Christophe Priou	Loire-Atlantique's 7th constituency	2002	LR		
Catherine Quéré	Charente-Maritime's 3rd constituency	2007	PS		
Marie-Line Reynaud	Charente's 2nd constituency	1997	PS		
Pierre Ribeaud	Isère's 5th constituency	2012	PS		
Arnaud Robinet	Marne's 1st constituency	2008	LR		
Alain Rodet	Haute-Vienne's 1st constituency	1981	PS		
Marcel Rogemont	Ille-et-Vilaine's 8th constituency	1997	PS		
René Rouquet	Val-de-Marne's 9th constituency	1981	PS		
Alain Rousset	Gironde's 7th constituency	2007	PS		
Béatrice Santais	Savoie's 3rd constituency	2012	PS		
André Santini	Hauts-de-Seine's 10th constituency	1988	UDI		
Odile Saugues	Puy-de-Dôme's 1st constituency	1997	PS		
Gilbert Sauvan	Alpes-de-Haute-Provence's 1st constituency	2012	PS		
François Scellier	Val-d'Oise's 6th constituency	2002	LR		
André Schneider	Bas-Rhin's 3rd constituency	1997	LR		
Roger-Gérard Schwartzenberg	Val-de-Marne's 3rd constituency	1986	PRG		
Gérard Sebaoun	Val-d'Oise's 4th constituency	2012	PS		
Michel Sordi	Haut-Rhin's 4th constituency	2002	LR		
Claude Sturni	Bas-Rhin's 9th constituency	2012	App. LR		
Alain Suguenot	Côte-d'Or's 5th constituency	1993	LR		
Jonas Tahuaitu	French Polynesia's 2nd constituency	2012	Th		
Suzanne Tallard	Charente-Maritime's 2nd constituency	2012	PS		
Michel Terrot	Rhône's 12th constituency	1986	LR		
Thomas Thévenoud	Saône-et-Loire's 1st constituency	2012	DVG		
Sylvie Tolmont	Sarthe's 4th constituency	2012	PS		
Jean-Paul Tuaiva	French Polynesia's 3rd constituency	2012	TH		
Jacques Valax	Tarn's 2nd constituency	2007	PS		
François Vannson	Vosges's 3rd constituency	1993	LR		
Michel Vauzelle	Bouches-du-Rhône's 16th constituency	2007	PS		
François-Xavier Villain	Nord's 18th constituency	2002	UDI		
Jean-Michel Villaumé	Haute-Saône's 2nd constituency	2007	PS		
Michel Voisin	Ain's 4th constituency	1988	LR	13 May 2017	
Laurent Wauquiez	Haute-Loire's 1st constituency	2004 (by-election)	LR	19 May 2017	
Patrick Weiten	Moselle's 9th constituency	2012	UDI	30 January 2017	
