= Second constituency of the Ain =

Constituency of the National Assembly of France

Ain's 2nd constituency
- inline Constituency of the National Assembly of France

- Boundary of Ain's 2nd constituency in Ain

- Location of Ain within France
- Deputy: Romain Daubié; MoDem
- Department: Ain

The 2nd constituency of the Ain is a French legislative constituency in the Ain département.

== Members elected ==
Election	Member	Party
1958	Marcel Anthonioz	CNIP
1962	Marcel Anthonioz	RI
1967	Marcel Anthonioz	RI
1968	Marcel Anthonioz	FNRI
1969	Michel Carrier	FNRI
1973	Marcel Anthonioz	FNRI
1976	Michel Carrier	FNRI
1978	Charles Millon	UDF
1981	Charles Millon	UDF
1986	proportional representation	
1988	Lucien Guichon	RPR
1993	Lucien Guichon	RPR
1997	Lucien Guichon	RPR
2002	Lucien Guichon	UMP
2007	Charles de La Verpillière	UMP
2012	Charles de La Verpillière	UMP
2017	Charles de La Verpillière	LR
2022	Romain Daubié	MoDem
2024	Romain Daubié	MoDem

== Election results ==
=== 2024 ===
Candidate	Party	Alliance	First round			Second round		
Candidate	Party	Alliance	Votes	%	+/–	Votes	%	+/–
Andréa Kotarac	RN		28,189	39.20	+15.97	31,766	44.91	
Romain Daubié	MoDem	ENS	17,414	24.21	-2.21	38,973	55.09	
Maxime Meyer	LÉ	NFP	16,981	23.61	-1.81	WITHDREW		
Alexandre Nanchi	LR		6,737	9.37	-5.34			
Olivier Eyraud	REC		1,863	2.59	-2.30			
Vincent Goutagny	LO		734	1.02	+0.17			
Valid votes			71,918	97.93	+0.49			
Blank votes			1,198	1.63	+0.39			
Null votes			321	0.44	+0.10			
Turnout			73,437	72.09	+22.38			
Abstentions			28,437	27.91	-22.38			
Registered voters			101,874					
Source: Ministry of the Interior, Le Monde
Result						MoDEM HOLD		

=== 2022 ===
Candidate	Party	Alliance	First round		Second round	
Candidate	Party	Alliance	Votes	%	Votes	%
Romain Daubié	MoDem	Ensemble	12,916	26.42	24,960	58.34
Lumir Lapray	EELV	NUPES	12,428	25.42	17,824	41.66
Olivier Eyraud	RN		11,354	23.23		
Alexandre Nanchi	LR	UDC	7,192	14.71		
Alexandre Costa	REC		2,392	4.89		
Thomas Iglesis	PA		653	1.34		
Delphine Carrier	LP	DSV	653	1.34		
Denis Baratay	LMR		618	1.26		
Vincent Goutagny	LO		415	0.85		
Colin Martet	DIV		265	0.54		
Valid votes			48,886	98.40	42,784	91.67
Blank votes			629	1.27	3,043	6.52
Null votes			168	0.34	845	1.81
Turnout			49,683	49.71	46,672	46.68
Abstentions			50,270	50.29	53,307	53.32
Registered voters			99,953		99,979	
Result			MoDEM GAIN FROM LR			

=== 2017 ===
Candidate	Label	First round		Second round	
Candidate	Label	Votes	%	Votes	%
Marie-Jeanne Béguet	MoDem	16,371	35.90	17,319	48.28
Charles de la Verpillière	LR	11,182	24.52	18,556	51.72
Anne Michaud	FN	7,553	16.56		
Sylviane Thiébaut	FI	4,896	10.74		
Albane Colin	EELV	2,874	6.30		
Pascale Lemerre	DLF	1,149	2.52		
Guy Brulland	PCF	676	1.48		
Sandrine Chomette	DIV	400	0.88		
Vincent Goutagny	EXG	303	0.66		
Atila Sahin	DIV	194	0.43		
Votes		45,598	100.00	35,875	100.00
Valid votes		45,598	98.64	35,875	91.60
Blank votes		471	1.02	2,424	6.19
Null votes		160	0.35	867	2.21
Turnout		46,229	49.43	39,166	41.89
Abstentions		47,291	50.57	54,341	58.11
Registered voters		93,520		93,507	
Source: Ministry of the Interior

=== 2012 ===
Summary of the 10 June and 17 June 2012 French legislative in Ain's 2nd Constituency election results
Candidate	Party		1st round		2nd round	
Candidate	Party		Votes	%	Votes	%
Charles de la Verpilliere	Union for a Popular Movement	UMP	19,217	37.26%	22,327	44.31%
Michel Raymond	Miscellaneous Left	DVG	11,900	23.07%	19,529	38.76%
Olivier Eyraud	National Front	FN	10,894	21.12%	8,530	16.93%
Paul Vernay	The Greens	VEC	5,213	10.11%		
Katie Philippe	Left Front	FG	2,215	4.29%		
Marie Jeanne Beguet		CEN	1,415	2.75%		
Claire Darmedru	Ecologist	ECO	495	0.96%		
Vincent Goutagny	Far Left	ExG	224	0.43%		
Total			51,576	100%	50,386	100%
Registered voters			86,982		86,937	
Blank/Void ballots			512	0.59%	550	0.63%
Turnout			52,088	59.88%	50,936	58.59%
Abstentions			34,894	40.12%	36,001	41.41%
Result					UMP HOLD	

=== 2007 ===
Legislative Election 2007: Ain 2nd
Party	Candidate	Votes	%	±%
UMP	Charles de la Verpillière	27,034	53.29	
PRG	Catherine Pidoux	9,217	18.17	
FN	Nicole de Lacheisserie	3,333	6.57	
MoDem	Pierre Ferrarese	3,217	6.34	
PCF	Katia Philippe	1,800	3.55	
LV	Jacques Cagnac	1,790	3.53	
LCR	Yves Dagand	1,375	2.71	
MPF	Bernard Leger	778	1.53	
MEI	Marie-Lise Meunier	631	1.24	
CPNT	Michel Fray	485	0.96	
LO	Guy Largeron	380	0.75	
MNR	Jean-Louis Seguret	380	0.75	
Workers' Party	Raoul Chavet	306	0.60	
Turnout		50,726	55.65	
UMP hold		Swing		

=== 2002 ===
Candidate	Label	First round		Second round→	
Candidate	Label	Votes	%	Votes	%
Lucien Guichon	UMP	20,791	41.14	25,811	61.89
Éliane Drut-Gorju	PS	10,439	20.66	15,891	38.11
Lydia Girault	FN	8,831	17.47		
Éric Gilbert	LV	2,043	4.04		
André Clavel	MNR	1,810	3.58		
Myléne Ferri	PCF	1,684	3.33		
Alain Cavet	Pôle républicain	1,254	2.48		
Denis Baratay	CPNT	800	1.58		
Fabienne Pin	MPF	798	1.58		
Guy Largeron	LO	658	1.30		
Bernadette Grelier	MÉI	553	1.09		
Didier Ecker	LCR	462	0.91		
Catherine Kallache	Gé	233	0.46		
Julien Duchesne	Regionalism	64	0.13		
Votes		50,539	100.00	41,702	100.00
Valid votes		50,539	98.17	41,702	95.03
Blank or null votes		941	1.83	2,180	4.97
Turnout		51,480	61.84	43,882	52.71
Abstentions		31,769	38.16	39,362	47.29
Registered voters		83,249		83,244	
Source: Ministry of the Interior

=== 1997 ===
Candidate	Party	Alliance	First round		Second round	
Candidate	Party	Alliance	Votes	%	Votes	%
Lucien Guichon	RPR		14,523	31.12	22,961	43.92
Amdré Clavel	FN		11,265	24.14	9,546	18.26
Jocelyne Bollini	PS		10,083	15.92	19,776	38.82
Georges Arpin	PCF		3,846	8.24		
Philippe Lebreton	MEI		1,847	3.96		
Pierre Ferrario	MPF	LDI	1,624	3.48		
Danielle Grange	LO		1,581	3.39		
Olivier Josserand	US4J		778	1.67		
Didier Eckel	MDC		692	1.48		
Raoul Chavet	PT		429	0.92		
Valid votes			46,668	94.81	52,283	96.78
Blank or Null votes			2,554	5.19	1,738	3.22
Turnout			49,222	65.31	54,021	71.68
Abstentions			26,140	34.69	21,339	28.32
Registered voters			75,362		75,360	
Result			RPR HOLD			

=== 1993 ===
Candidate	Party	Alliance	First round		Second round	
Candidate	Party	Alliance	Votes	%	Votes	%
Lucien Guichon	RPR	UPF	21,481	46.63	26,075	70.64
Jean Alcaraz	FN		8,674	18.79	10,836	29.36
Éliane Drut-Gorju	PS	ADFP	6,441	13.95		
Éric Gilbert	LV	EE	5,896	12.77		
Georges Arpin	PCF		3,674	7.96		
Valid votes			46,166	94.93	36,911	83.38
Blank or Null votes			2,464	5.07	7,359	16.62
Turnout			48,630	66.56	44,270	60.59
Abstentions			24,434	33.54	28,789	39.41
Registered voters			73,064		73,059	
Result			RPR HOLD			

=== 1988 ===
Candidate	Party	Alliance	First round		Second round	
Candidate	Party	Alliance	Votes	%	Votes	%
Lucien Guichon	RPR	URC	17,581	42.63	24,360	53.55
Gérard Lora-Tonet	PS		14,163	34.34	21,141	46.46
Emmanuel Leroy	FN		5,472	13.27		
Fernand Roustit	PCF		4,022	9.76		
Valid votes			41,238	98.20	45,501	97.98
Blank or Null votes			759	1.8	940	2.02
Turnout			41,996	61.96	46,441	68”53
Abstentions			25,788	38.04	21,331	31.47
Registered voters			67,784		67,772	
Result			RPR GAIN			

=== 1981 ===
Legislative Election 1981: Ain 2nd
Party	Candidate	Votes	%	±%
UDF	Charles Millon	34,128	54.53	−4.58
PS	Jean Chabert	19876	31.76	+13.23
PCF	Guy Chavanne	8,586	13.72	−27.17
Turnout		63,254	69.90	−14.22
UDF hold		Swing		

=== 1978 ===
Candidate	Party	Alliance	First round			Second round		
Candidate	Party	Alliance	Votes	%	+/–	Votes	%	+/–
Charles Millon	UDF	PR	25,667	36.77		42,166	59.11	
Guy Chavanne	PCF		15,127	21.67		29,173	40.89	
Robert Mériaudeau	PS		12,935	18.53		WITHDREW		
Lucien Guichon	RPR		9,787	14.02				
Alain Partensky	Écologie 78		2,937	4.21				
Louis Fusari	DVD		1,452	2.08				
Marie-Louise Landucci	LO		778	1.11				
Jean-Claude Gioria	UOPDP		654	0.94				
Paul Lupkins	PSA		463	0.76				
Valid votes			69,800	98.18		71,339	97.44	
Blank or Null votes			1,297	1.82		1,875	2.56	
Turnout			71,097	81.70		73,214	84.12	
Abstentions			15,921	18.30		13,824	15.89	
Registered voters			87,018			87,038		
Result						UDF GAIN		

=== 1973 ===
Candidate	Party	Alliance	First round			Second round		
Candidate	Party	Alliance	Votes	%	+/–	Votes	%	+/–
Marcel Anthonioz	RI	URP	27,768	48.54		33,109	60.04	
Guy Chavanne	PCF		11,229	19.63		22,035	39.96	
Robert Mériaudeau	PS	UGSD	9,969	17.43		WITHDREW		
André Autin	Rad	MR	4,828	8.44				
Paul Lupkins	PSU		1,756	3.07				
Maurice Barder	DVD		967	1.69				
Roland Bénier	GO	FP	692	1.21				
Valid votes			57,209	98.27		55,144	95.78	
Blank or Null votes			1,008	1.73		2,429	4.22	
Turnout			58,217	77.78		57,573	76.93	
Abstentions			16,633	22.22		17,269	23.07	
Registered voters			74,850			74,842		
Result						RI HOLD		

=== 1968 ===
Candidate	Party	Alliance	First round			
Candidate	Party	Alliance	Votes	%	+/–	
Marcel Anthonioz	RI	URP	30,717	56.76		
Marcel Monnier	PCF		10,389	19.20		
Paul Saint-Cyr	Radical	FGDS	5,688	10.51		
Simon Pernod	CD	PDM	4,526	8.36		
Joseph Mazard	PSU		1,895	3.50		
Pierre-Charles Boccadoro	Modérés		907	1.68		
Valid votes	54,122	99				
Blank or Null votes	549	1				
Turnout	54,671	77.85				
Abstentions	15,557	22.15				
Registered voters	70,228					
Result						RI HOLD

=== 1967 ===
Legislative Election 1967: Ain 2nd
Party	Candidate	Votes	%	±%
RI	Marcel Anthonioz	27,551	53.57	+18.33
PCF	Marcel Monnier	11,105	21.59	+0.06
PRV	Louis Chanel	10,352	20.13	
Moderate Republicans	Pierre-Charles Boccadoro	2,421	4.71	
Turnout		52,566	76.75	+17.26
RI hold		Swing	+6.53	

=== 1962 ===
Candidate	Party	Alliance	First round			Second round		
Candidate	Party	Alliance	Votes	%	+/–	Votes	%	+/–
Marcel Anthonioz (incumbent)	RI		14,016	35.24	+5.35	20,969	47.04	+1.20
Marcel Monnier	PCF		8,563	21.53	+0.58	12,642	28.36	+7.74
Henri Montmasson	UNR-UDT		7,702	19.36		8,212	18.42	
Pierres-Charles Boccadoro	DVD	Gaullism	4,857	12.21		2,750	6.17	
Gilbert Coltice	SFIO		4,636	11.66		WITHDREW		
Valid votes			39,774	98.04	-0.23	44,573	98.31	-0.51
Blank or Null votes			796	1.96	+0.23	764	1.69	+0.51
Turnout			40,570	59.49	-10.66	45,337	66.48	-6.37
Abstentions			27,623	40.51	+10.66	22,857	33.52	+6.37
Registered voters			68,193			68,194		
Result						RI GAIN		

=== 1958 ===
Candidate	Party	Alliance	First round			Second round		
Candidate	Party	Alliance	Votes	%	+/–	Votes	%	+/–
Marcel Anthonioz	CNIP		14,030	29.89		22,458	45.84	
Henri Bourbon	PCF		9,835	20.95		10,104	20.62	
Henri Romans-Petit	CR		9,311	19.84		16,428	33.53	
Pierre Dominjon	MRP		8,803	18.75		WITHDREW		
Gilbert Coltice	SFIO		4,960	10.57		WITHDREW		
Valid votes			46,939	98.27		48,990	98.82	
Blank or Null votes			824	1.73		587	1.18	
Turnout			47,763	70.15		49,577	72.85	
Abstentions			20,326	29.85		18,475	27.15	
Registered voters			68,089			68,052		
Result						SFIO GAIN		

== Sources ==
- Official results of French elections from 1998: "Résultats électoraux officiels en France" (in French). Archived from the original on 20 December 2011.
