= 2022 French legislative election in Ain =

Election results

| ← 2017 | 12 June 2022 and 19 June 2022 | 2024 → |
- Results of the second round.

The 2022 French legislative election occurred on 12 June 2022 and 19 June 2022. In the Ain department, five deputies were elected with the department's five constituencies.

== Results ==
=== Elected deputies ===
| Constituency | Outgoing deputy | Party | Elected or re-elected deputy | Party |
|---|---|---|---|---|
| 1st | Xavier Breton | LR | Xavier Breton | LR |
| 2nd | Charles de La Verpillière* | LR | Romain Daubié | MoDem |
| 3rd | Olga Givernet | LREM | Olga Givernet | LREM |
| 4th | Stéphane Trompille | LREM | Jérôme Buisson | RN |
| 5th | Damien Abad | SE | Damien Abad | SE |
* Outgoing deputy not-standing for re-election in 2022.

=== Department-wide results ===
Results of the 2022 French legislative election in Ain
| Party or coalition | 1st round | | | 2nd round | | | Total seats | +/- |
| Party or coalition | Votes | % | Seats | Votes | % | Seats | Total seats | +/- |
|---|---|---|---|---|---|---|---|---|
| La République En Marche! (LREM) | 26,092 | 12.59 | 0 | 18,398 | 10.24 | 1 | 1 | ▼1 |
| Democratic Movement (MoDem) | 12,916 | 6.23 | 0 | 24,960 | 13.90 | 1 | 1 | ▲1 |
| Independent (SE) | 12,034 | 5.81 | 0 | 17,687 | 9.85 | 1 | 1 | ▲1 |
| Ensemble (ENS) | 51,042 | 24.63 | 0 | 61,045 | 33.99 | 3 | **3** | ▲1 |
| La France Insoumise (LFI) | 24,261 | 11.71 | 0 | 39,510 | 22.00 | 0 | 0 | 0 |
| Europe Ecology – The Greens (EELV) | 12,428 | 6.00 | 0 | 17,824 | 9.92 | 0 | 0 | 0 |
| Socialist Party (PS) | 9,982 | 4.82 | 0 | 14,203 | 7.91 | 0 | 0 | 0 |
| New Ecologic and Social People's Union (NUPES) | 46,671 | 22.52 | 0 | 71,537 | 39.83 | 0 | 0 | 0 |
| National Rally (RN) | 43,544 | 21.01 | 0 | 22,601 | 12.58 | 1 | **1** | ▲1 |
| The Republicans (LR) | 34,994 | 16.88 | 0 | 24,408 | 13.59 | 1 | 1 | ▼2 |
| Union of the Right and Centre (UDC) | 34,994 | 16.88 | 0 | 24,408 | 13.59 | 1 | **1** | ▼2 |
| Reconquête (REC) | 10,801 | 5.21 | 0 | | | | 0 | N/A |
| Animalist Party (PA) | 3,461 | 1.67 | 0 | | | | 0 | 0 |
| The Patriots (LP) | 1,632 | 0.79 | 0 | | | | 0 | 0 |
| Debout la France (DLF) | 1,203 | 0.58 | 0 | | | | 0 | 0 |
| Union for France (UPF) | 2,835 | 1.37 | 0 | | | | 0 | 0 |
| Radical Party of the Left (PRG) | 2,215 | 1.07 | 0 | | | | 0 | N/A |
| Rurality Movement (LMR) | 1,992 | 0.96 | 0 | | | | 0 | 0 |
| Lutte Ouvrière (LO) | 1,809 | 0.87 | 0 | | | | 0 | 0 |
| Popular Ecology | 1,763 | 0.85 | 0 | | | | 0 | N/A |
| Federation of the Republican Left (FGR) | 1,763 | 0.85 | 0 | | | | 0 | N/A |
| Independent Workers' Party (POID) | 281 | 0.14 | 0 | | | | 0 | N/A |
| Sovereign Republic (RS) | 265 | 0.13 | 0 | | | | 0 | N/A |
| The Reason of the People | 265 | 0.13 | 0 | | | | 0 | N/A |
| Pirate Party (PP) | 82 | 0.04 | 0 | | | | 0 | 0 |
| Sans Étiquette (SE) | 5,511 | 2.66 | 0 | | | | 0 | 0 |
| Total votes | 207,266 | 98.14 | | 179,591 | 90.57 | | | |
| White votes | 2,964 | 1.40 | | 14,338 | 7.23 | | | |
| Rejected votes | 959 | 0.45 | | 4,370 | 2.20 | | | |
| **Total** | **211,189** | **100** | **0** | **198,299** | **100** | **5** | **5** | **0** |
| Abstentions | 229,508 | 52.08 | | 242,450 | 55.01 | | | |
| Registered voters - voter turnout | 440,697 | 47.92 | | 440,749 | 44.99 | | | |

Results by nuance of the Ministry of the Interior
| Nuances | | 1st round | | | 2nd round | | | Total seats | +/- |
| Nuances | | Votes | % | Seats | Votes | % | Seats | Total seats | +/- |
|---|---|---|---|---|---|---|---|---|---|
| New Ecologic and Social People's Union | NUP | 46,671 | 22.52 | 0 | 71,537 | 39.83 | 0 | 0 | 0 |
| National Rally | RN | 43,544 | 21.01 | 0 | 22,601 | 12.58 | 1 | **1** | ▲1 |
| Ensemble! | ENS | 39,008 | 18.82 | 0 | 43,358 | 24.14 | 2 | **2** | 0 |
| The Republicains | LR | 34,994 | 16.88 | 0 | 24,408 | 13.59 | 1 | **1** | ▼2 |
| Miscellaneous Right | DVD | 14,026 | 6.77 | 0 | 17,687 | 9.85 | 1 | **1** | ▲1 |
| Reconquête | REC | 10,801 | 5.21 | 0 | | | | 0 | N/A |
| Miscellaneous Centre | DVC | 4,282 | 2.07 | 0 | | | | 0 | N/A |
| Ecologists | ECO | 4,063 | 1.96 | 0 | | | | 0 | 0 |
| Sovereign right | DSV | 2,835 | 1.37 | 0 | | | | 0 | 0 |
| Radical Party of the Left | RDG | 2,215 | 1.07 | 0 | | | | 0 | 0 |
| Miscellaneous extreme left | DXG | 1,809 | 0.87 | 0 | | | | 0 | 0 |
| Divers | DIV | 1,565 | 0.76 | 0 | | | | 0 | 0 |
| Miscellaneous Left | DVG | 292 | 0.14 | 0 | | | | 0 | 0 |
| Total votes | | 207,266 | 98.14 | | 179,591 | 90.57 | | | |
| White votes | | 2,964 | 1.40 | | 14,338 | 7.23 | | | |
| Rejected votes | | 959 | 0.45 | | 4,370 | 2.20 | | | |
| **Total** | | **211,189** | **100** | **0** | **198,299** | **100** | **5** | **5** | **0** |
| Abstentions | | 229,508 | 52.08 | | 242,450 | 55.01 | | | |
| Registered voters - voter turnout | | 440,697 | 47.92 | | 440,749 | 44.99 | | | |

=== Results by constituency ===
The candidates are presented in descending order based upon the results of the first round. In the event of a victory in the second round by a candidate who did not come in first in the first round, their results are bolded.

==== First constituency ====
Outgoing deputy: Xavier Breton (The Republicans).

Results in the 1st constituency
| Candidate | Party and coalition | Nuance | 1st round | | 2nd round | |
| Candidate | Party and coalition | Nuance | Votes | % | Votes | % |
|---|---|---|---|---|---|---|
| Xavier Breton | LR (UDC) | LR | 10,599 | 25.35 | 24,408 | 63.22 |
| Sébastien Guéraud | PS (NUPES) | NUP | 9,982 | 23.87 | 14,203 | 36.78 |
| Brigitte Piroux Giannotti | RN | RN | 8,971 | 21.46 | | |
| Vincent Guillermin | LREM (ENS) | ENS | 8,071 | 19.30 | | |
| Julien Bellon | REC | REC | 1,995 | 4.77 | | |
| Eliane Armenjon | PA | ECO | 1,161 | 2.78 | | |
| Michael Mendes | DLF (UPF) | DSV | 641 | 1.53 | | |
| Éric Lahy | LO | DXG | 391 | 0.94 | | |
| Valid votes | | | 41.811 | 98.30 | 38,611 | 94.76 |
| White votes | | | 490 | 1.15 | 1 590 | 3.90 |
| Rejected votes | | | 234 | 0.55 | 547 | 1.34 |
| **Total** | | | **42,535** | **100** | **40,748** | **100** |
| Abstentions | | | 43,652 | 50.65 | 45,446 | 52.73 |
| Registered voters - voter turnout | | | 86,187 | 49.35 | 86,194 | 47.27 |

==== Second constituency ====
Outgoing deputy: Charles de La Verpillière (The Republicans).

Results in the 2nd constituency
| Candidate | Party and coalition | Nuance | 1st round | | 2nd round | |
| Candidate | Party and coalition | Nuance | Votes | % | Votes | % |
|---|---|---|---|---|---|---|
| Romain Daubié | MoDem (ENS) | ENS | 12,916 | 26.42 | 24,960 | 58.34 |
| Lumir Lapray | EELV (NUPES) | NUP | 12,428 | 25.42 | 17,824 | 41.66 |
| Olivier Eyraud | RN | RN | 11,354 | 23.23 | | |
| Alexandre Nanchi | LR (UDC) | LR | 7,192 | 14.71 | | |
| Alexandre Costa | REC | REC | 2,392 | 4.89 | | |
| Thomas Iglésis | PA | ECO | 653 | 1.34 | | |
| Delphine Carrier | LP (UPF) | DSV | 653 | 1.34 | | |
| Denis Baratay | LMR | DVD | 618 | 1.26 | | |
| Vincent Goutagny | LO | DXG | 415 | 0.85 | | |
| Colin Martet | RS (LRDP) | DIV | 265 | 0.54 | | |
| Valid votes | | | 48,886 | 98.40 | 42,784 | 91.67 |
| White votes | | | 629 | 1.27 | 3,043 | 6.52 |
| Rejected votes | | | 168 | 0.34 | 845 | 1.81 |
| **Total** | | | **49,683** | **100** | **46672** | **100** |
| Abstentions | | | 50,270 | 50.29 | 53,307 | 53.32 |
| Registered voters - voter turnout | | | 99,953 | 49.71 | 99,979 | 46.68 |

==== Third constituency ====
Outgoing deputy: Olga Givernet (La République en Marche!).

Results in the 3rd constituency
| Candidate | Party and coalition | Nuance | 1st round | | 2nd round | |
| Candidate | Party and coalition | Nuance | Votes | % | Votes | % |
|---|---|---|---|---|---|---|
| Olga Givernet | LREM (ENS) | ENS | 10,704 | 29.96 | 18,398 | 58.72 |
| Christian Jolie | LFI (NUPES) | NUP | 7,990 | 22.36 | 12,932 | 41.28 |
| Véronique Baude | LR (UDC) | LR | 6,425 | 17.98 | | |
| Frédéric Franck | RN | RN | 4,993 | 13.97 | | |
| Karine Dubarry | REC | REC | 1,835 | 5.14 | | |
| Jean-Loup Kastler | EP (Federation of the Republican Left) | ECO | 1,763 | 4.93 | | |
| Fulgence Kouassi | SE | DIV | 596 | 1.67 | | |
| Thierry Vergnas | LP (UPF) | DSV | 543 | 1.52 | | |
| Marine Morvan Lembert | PA | ECO | 530 | 1.48 | | |
| Cécile Maisonnette | LO | DXG | 281 | 0.79 | | |
| Franck Bisetti | PP | DVC | 69 | 0.19 | | |
| Maxence Ferte | SE | DIV | 0 | 0.00 | | |
| Valid votes | | | 35,729 | 98.54 | 31,330 | 92.38 |
| White votes | | | 385 | 1.06 | 1,870 | 5.51 |
| Rejected votes | | | 145 | 0.40 | 716 | 2.11 |
| **Total** | | | **36,259** | **100** | **33,916** | **100** |
| Abstentions | | | 45,945 | 55.89 | 48,291 | 58.74 |
| Registered voters - voter turnout | | | 82,204 | 44.11 | 82,207 | 41.26 |

==== Fourth constituency ====
Outgoing deputy: Stéphane Trompille (La République en Marche!).

Results in the 4th constituency
| Candidate | Party and coalition | Nuance | 1st round | | 2nd round | |
| Candidate | Party and coalition | Nuance | Votes | % | Votes | % |
|---|---|---|---|---|---|---|
| Jérôme Buisson | RN | RN | 11,116 | 24.82 | 22,601 | 62.27 |
| Philippe Lerda | LFI (NUPES) | NUP | 7,786 | 17.38 | 13,696 | 37.73 |
| Isabelle Seguin | LREM (ENS) | ENS | 7,317 | 16.34 | | |
| Aurane Reihanian | LR (UDC) | LR | 7,198 | 16.07 | | |
| Stéphane Trompille | LREM diss. | DVC | 4,211 | 9.40 | | |
| Benoît de Boysson | REC | REC | 2,506 | 5.59 | | |
| Ali Benmedjahed | PRG | RDG | 2,215 | 4.95 | | |
| Nicolas Favre | PA | ECO | 1,119 | 2.50 | | |
| Annick Veillerot | DLF (UPF) | DSV | 562 | 1.25 | | |
| Sacha Forca | LMR | DVD | 443 | 0.99 | | |
| Sylvain Cousson | LO | DXG | 308 | 0.69 | | |
| Alban Defrasne | PP | DVG | 11 | 0.02 | | |
| Valid votes | | | 44,792 | 9814 | 36,297 | 84.02 |
| White votes | | | 638 | 1.40 | 5,481 | 12.69 |
| Rejected votes | | | 209 | 0.45 | 1,423 | 3.29 |
| **Total** | | | **45,639** | **100** | **43,201** | **100** |
| Abstentions | | | 49,258 | 51.91 | 51,702 | 54.48 |
| Registered voters - voter turnout | | | 94,897 | 48.09 | 94,903 | 45.52 |

==== Fifth constituency ====
Outgoing deputy: Damien Abad (Independent/Miscellaneous right).

Results in the 5th constituency
| Candidate | Party and coalition | Nuance | 1st round | | 2nd round | |
| Candidate | Party and coalition | Nuance | Votes | % | Votes | % |
|---|---|---|---|---|---|---|
| Damien Abad | SE (ENS) | DVD | 12,034 | 33.38 | 17,687 | 57.86 |
| Florence Pisani | LFI (NUPES) | NUP | 8,485 | 23.54 | 12,882 | 42.14 |
| Joëlle Nambotin | RN | RN | 7 110 | 19,72 | | |
| Julien Martinez | LR (UDC) | LR | 3 580 | 9,93 | | |
| Philippe Tournier-Billon | REC | REC | 2 073 | 5,75 | | |
| Stéphanie Paris | LMR | DVD | 931 | 2,58 | | |
| Celil Yilmaz | SE | DIV | 704 | 1,95 | | |
| Grégory Fabris | LP (UPF) | DSV | 436 | 1,21 | | |
| Sylvie Crozet | LO | DXG | 414 | 1,15 | | |
| Jean-Michel Boulmé | POID | DVG | 281 | 0,78 | | |
| Valid votes | | | 36,048 | 97.23 | 30,569 | 90.54 |
| White votes | | | 820 | 2.21 | 2,354 | 6.97 |
| Rejected votes | | | 206 | 0.56 | 839 | 2.49 |
| **Total** | | | **37,074** | **100** | **33,762** | **100** |
| Abstentions | | | 40,382 | 52.14 | 43,704 | 56.42 |
| Registered voters - voter turnout | | | 77,456 | 47.86 | 77,466 | 43.58 |
