= 2017 French legislative election in Ain =

2022 French legislative election in Ain
| ← 2012 | 11 & 18 June 2017 | 2022 → |

The 2017 French legislative election occurred on 11 June 2017 and 18 June 2017. In the Ain department, five deputies were elected with the department's five constituencies.

== Results ==
=== Elected deputies ===
| Constituency | Outgoing deputy | Party | Elected or re-elected deputy | Party |
|---|---|---|---|---|
| 1st | Xavier Breton | LR | Xavier Breton | LR |
| 2nd | Charles de La Verpillière | LR | Charles de La Verpillière | LR |
| 3rd | Stéphanie Pernod-Beaudon | LR | Olga Givernet | LREM |
| 4th | Michel Voisin* | LR | Stéphane Trompille | LREM |
| 5th | Damien Abad | LR | Damien Abad | LR |
* Outgoing deputy not-standing for re-election in 2017.

=== Department-wide results ===
Results of the 2022 French legislative election in Ain
| Party | 1st round | | 2nd round | | Seats |
| Party | Votes | % | Votes | % | Seats |
|---|---|---|---|---|---|
| The Republicans | **49** **,077** | **24.66** | **65** **,706** | **41.28** | ▼**3** |
| La République En Marche! | 40,046 | 20.13 | 48,622 | 30.55 | ▲2 |
| National Front | 31,098 | 15.63 | 12,404 | 7.79 | 0 |
| Democratic Movement | 29,905 | 15.03 | 32,31 | 20.38 | 0 |
| La France | 19,019 | 9.56 | | | |
| Ecologist Party / Europe Ecology - The Greens | 7,374 | 3.71 | | | |
| Socialist Party | 6,187 | 3.11 | | | |
| Divers | 4,238 | 2.13 | | | |
| Union of Democrats and Independents | 3,164 | 1.59 | | | |
| French Communist Party | 2,920 | 1.47 | | | |
| Debout la France | 2,646 | 1.33 | | | |
| Radical Party of the Left | 2,025 | 1.02 | | | |
| Extreme left | 1,219 | 0.61 | | | |
| Miscellaneous left | 59 | 0.03 | | | |
| Valid votes | 198,977 | 98.33 | 159,163 | 91.46 | 5 |
| White votes | 2,195 | 1.08 | 11,105 | 6.38 | 5 |
| Rejected votes | 1,182 | 0.58 | 3,759 | 2.16 | 5 |
| **Total** | **202,354** | **100.00** | **174,027** | **100.00** | 5 |
| Abstentions | 214,253 | 51.43 | 242,375 | 58.21 | 5 |
| Registered voters - voter turnout | 416,607 | 48.57 | 416,402 | 41.79 | 5 |

=== Results by constituency ===
The candidates are presented in descending order based upon the results of the first round. In the event of a victory in the second round by a candidate who did not come in first in the first round, their results are bolded.

==== First constituency ====
Outgoing deputy: Xavier Breton (The Republicans).

Results in the 1st constituency
| Candidate | Party and coalition | 1st round | | 2nd round | |
| Candidate | Party and coalition | Votes | % | Votes | % |
|---|---|---|---|---|---|
| Laurent Mallet | MoDem | 13,534 | 33.89 | 15,112 | 46.25 |
| Xavier Breton | LR | 10,693 | 26.78 | **17,563** | **53.75** |
| Jérôme Buisson | FN | 6,174 | 15.46 | | |
| Fabrine Martin-Zemlik | LFI | 3,874 | 9.70 | | |
| Florence Blatrix-Contat | PS | 3,687 | 9.23 | | |
| Jacques Fontaine | PCF | 656 | 1.64 | | |
| Laurane Raimondo | ECO | 562 | 1.41 | | |
| Maude Lépagnot | LO | 293 | 0.73 | | |
| Marie Carlier | UPR | 247 | 0.62 | | |
| Gilbert Bonnot | Divers | 211 | 0.53 | | |
| Valid votes | | 39,931 | 98.28 | 32,675 | 91.45 |
| White votes | | 545 | 1.34 | 2,180 | 610 |
| Rejected votes | | 155 | 0.38 | 873 | 2.44 |
| **Total** | | **40,631** | **100.00** | **35,728** | **100.00** |
| Abstentions | | 42,063 | 50.87 | 46,948 | 56.79 |
| Registered voters - voter turnout | | 82,694 | 49.13 | 82,676 | 43.21 |

==== Second constituency ====
Outgoing deputy: Charles de La Verpillière (The Republicans).

Results in the 2nd constituency
| Candidate | Party and coalition | 1st round | | 2nd round | |
| Candidate | Party and coalition | Votes | % | Votes | % |
|---|---|---|---|---|---|
| Marie-Jeanne Béguet | MoDem | 16,371 | 35.90 | 17,319 | 48.28 |
| Charles de La Verpillière | LR | 11,182 | 24.52 | **18,556** | **51.72** |
| Anne Michaud | FN | 7,553 | 16.56 | | |
| Sylviane Thiébaut | LFI | 4,896 | 10.74 | | |
| Albane Colin | EELV | 2,874 | 6.30 | | |
| Pascale Lemerre | DLF | 1,149 | 2.52 | | |
| Guy Brulland | PCF | 676 | 1.48 | | |
| Sandrine Chomette | UPR | 400 | 0.88 | | |
| Vincent Goutagny | LO | 303 | 066 | | |
| Atila Sahin | PEJ | 194 | 0.43 | | |
| Valid votes | | 45,598 | 98.64 | 35,875 | 91.60 |
| White votes | | 471 | 1.02 | 2,390 | 6.10 |
| Rejected votes | | 160 | 0.35 | 901 | 2.30 |
| **Total** | | **46,229** | **100.00** | **39,166** | **100.00** |
| Abstentions | | 47,291 | 50.57 | 54,341 | 58,11 |
| Registered voters - voter turnout | | 93,520 | 49,43 | 93,507 | 41,89 |

==== Third constituency ====
Outgoing deputy: Stéphanie Pernod-Beaudon (The Republicans).

Results in the 3rd constituency
| Candidate | Party and coalition | 1st round | | 2nd round | |
| Candidate | Party and coalition | Votes | % | Votes | % |
|---|---|---|---|---|---|
| Olga Givernet | LREM | 15,405 | 45.30 | **16,552** | **61.86** |
| Stéphanie Pernod-Beaudon | LR | 7,281 | 21.41 | 10,204 | 38.14 |
| Gaëtan Noblet | FN | 3,808 | 11.20 | | |
| Christian Jolie | LFI | 3,064 | 9.01 | | |
| Jean Mercier | EELV | 1,496 | 4.40 | | |
| Géraldine Sacchi-Hassanein | PS | 1,468 | 4.32 | | |
| Thierry Borne | Divers | 488 | 1.43 | | |
| Jean-Sébastien Bloch | PCF | 431 | 1.27 | | |
| Frédéric Mozer | UPR | 361 | 1.06 | | |
| Éric Lahy | LO | 147 | 0.43 | | |
| Fabrice Gentile | DVG | 59 | 0.17 | | |
| Valid votes | | 34,008 | 98.62 | 26,756 | 91.91 |
| White votes | | 359 | 1.04 | 1,755 | 6.03 |
| Rejected votes | | 116 | 0.34 | 599 | 2.06 |
| **Total** | | **34,483** | **100.00** | **29,110** | **100.00** |
| Abstentions | | 41,131 | 54.40 | 46,438 | 61.47 |
| Registered voters - voter turnout | | 75,614 | 45.60 | 75,548 | 38.53 |

==== Fourth constituency ====
Outgoing deputy: Michel Voisin (The Republicans).

Results in the 4th constituency
| Candidate | Party and coalition | 1st round | | 2nd round | |
| Candidate | Party and coalition | Votes | % | Votes | % |
|---|---|---|---|---|---|
| Stéphane Trompille | LREM | 15,492 | 36.00 | **22 532** | **64.50** |
| Blanche Chaussat | FN | 7,964 | 18.51 | 12,404 | 35.50 |
| Guy Billoudet | LR | 7,178 | 16.68 | | |
| Line Huguet | LFI | 3,426 | 7.96 | | |
| Muriel Luga-Giraud | UDI | 3,164 | 7.35 | | |
| Sylviane Chêne | PRG | 2,025 | 4.71 | | |
| Anne Partensky-Leibman | EELV | 1,391 | 3.23 | | |
| Annick Veillerot | DLF | 860 | 2.00 | | |
| Olivia Symniacos | PA | 459 | 1.07 | | |
| Catherine Lattard | PCF | 348 | 0.81 | | |
| Yves Antoinette | Divers | 232 | 0.54 | | |
| Thierry Loubignes | UPR | 199 | 0.46 | | |
| Electre Dracos | LO | 198 | 0.46 | | |
| Xavier Adam | PP | 97 | 0.23 | | |
| Valid votes | | 43,033 | 98.33 | 34,936 | 91.21 |
| White votes | | 521 | 1.19 | 2,444 | 6.38 |
| Rejected votes | | 211 | 0.48 | 922 | 2.41 |
| **Total** | | **43,765** | **100.00** | **38,302** | **100.00** |
| Abstentions | | 45,625 | 51.04 | 51,090 | 57.15 |
| Registered voters - voter turnout | | 89,390 | 48.96 | 89,392 | 42.85 |

==== Fifth constituency ====
Outgoing deputy: Damien Abad (The Republicans).

Results in the 5th constituency
| Candidate | Party and coalition | 1st round | | 2nd round | |
| Candidate | Party and coalition | Votes | % | Votes | % |
|---|---|---|---|---|---|
| Damien Abad | LR | 12,743 | 35.00 | **19,383** | **67.02** |
| Hélène de Meire | LREM | 9,149 | 25.13 | 9,538 | 32.98 |
| Pénélope Chalon | FN | 5,599 | 15.38 | | |
| Bertrand Jacquier | LFI | 3,759 | 10.32 | | |
| Carole Pontier | EELV | 1,051 | 2.89 | | |
| Élodie Schwander | PS | 1,032 | 2.83 | | |
| Mylène Ferri | PCF | 809 | 2.22 | | |
| Ahmet Cetin | PEJ | 721 | 1.98 | | |
| Claude Juillet | DLF | 637 | 1.75 | | |
| Monique Meudan | PA | 398 | 1.09 | | |
| Jean-Philippe Archeny | UPR | 231 | 0.63 | | |
| Guy Largeron | LO | 158 | 0.43 | | |
| Jean-Michel Boulmé | POID | 121 | 0.33 | | |
| Valid votes | | 36,408 | 98.53 | 28,921 | 91.18 |
| White votes | | 374 | 1.01 | 1,951 | 6.15 |
| Rejected votes | | 168 | 0.45 | 847 | 2.67 |
| **Total** | | **36,950** | **100.00** | **31,719** | **100.00** |
| Abstentions | | 38,409 | 50.97 | 43,576 | 57.87 |
| Registered voters - voter turnout | | 75,359 | 49.03 | 75,295 | 42.13 |
