= 2024 French legislative election in Jura =

Following the first round of the 2024 French legislative election on 30 June 2024, runoff elections in each constituency where no candidate received a vote share greater than 50 percent were scheduled for 7 July. Candidates permitted to stand in the runoff elections needed to either come in first or second place in the first round or achieve more than 12.5 percent of the votes of the entire electorate (as opposed to 12.5 percent of the vote share due to low turnout).

== Jura ==
=== 1st constituency ===
| Candidate | Party or alliance | | First round | | Second round | |
| Candidate | Party or alliance | | Votes | % | Votes | % |
|---|---|---|---|---|---|---|
| Valérie Graby | National Rally | | 17,517 | 39.03 | 19,050 | 43.15 |
| Danielle Brulebois | Ensemble | Renaissance | 16,231 | 36.16 | 25,097 | 56.85 |
| Anthony Brondel | New Popular Front | La France Insoumise | 10,352 | 23.06 | | |
| Johanne Morel | Far-left | Lutte Ouvrière | 786 | 1.75 | | |
| Total | | | 44,886 | 100.00 | 44,147 | 100.00 |
| Valid votes | | | 44,886 | 96.75 | 44,147 | 94.39 |
| Invalid votes | | | 481 | 1.04 | 674 | 1.44 |
| Blank votes | | | 1,025 | 2.21 | 1,952 | 4.17 |
| Total votes | | | 46,392 | 100.00 | 46,773 | 100.00 |
| Registered voters/turnout | | | 64,925 | 71.45 | 64,927 | 72.04 |

=== 2nd constituency ===
| Candidate | Party or alliance | | First round | | Second round | |
| Candidate | Party or alliance | | Votes | % | Votes | % |
|---|---|---|---|---|---|---|
| Marie-Christine Dalloz | The Republicans | | 14,507 | 38.59 | 23,361 | 65.02 |
| Thierry Mosca | National Rally | | 12,315 | 32.76 | 12,568 | 34.98 |
| Evelyne Ternant | New Popular Front | Communist Party | 9,303 | 24.75 | | |
| Patrick Lançon | Sovereigntist right | Independent | 694 | 1.85 | | |
| André Bigot | Reconquête | | 390 | 1.04 | | |
| Christian Marchet | Far-left | Lutte Ouvrière | 386 | 1.03 | | |
| Total | | | 37,595 | 100.00 | 35,929 | 100.00 |
| Valid votes | | | 37,595 | 97.10 | 35,929 | 94.28 |
| Invalid votes | | | 356 | 0.92 | 524 | 1.38 |
| Blank votes | | | 766 | 1.98 | 1,654 | 4.34 |
| Total votes | | | 38,717 | 100.00 | 38,107 | 100.00 |
| Registered voters/turnout | | | 55,723 | 69.48 | 55,691 | 68.43 |

=== 3rd constituency ===
| Candidate | Party or alliance | | First round | | Second round | |
| Candidate | Party or alliance | | Votes | % | Votes | % |
|---|---|---|---|---|---|---|
| Aurore Vuillemin-Plancon | National Rally | | 19,354 | 39.73 | 20,915 | 43.81 |
| Justine Gruet | The Republicans | | 16,727 | 34.34 | 26,822 | 56.19 |
| Hervé Prat | New Popular Front | The Ecologists | 11,834 | 24.29 | | |
| Dominique Revoy | Far-left | Lutte Ouvrière | 796 | 1.63 | | |
| Total | | | 48,711 | 100.00 | 47,737 | 100.00 |
| Valid votes | | | 48,711 | 97.60 | 47,737 | 94.95 |
| Invalid votes | | | 408 | 0.82 | 680 | 1.35 |
| Blank votes | | | 791 | 1.58 | 1,860 | 3.70 |
| Total votes | | | 49,910 | 100.00 | 50,277 | 100.00 |
| Registered voters/turnout | | | 70,205 | 71.09 | 70,218 | 71.60 |
