= 2024 French legislative election in Ain =

← 2022	30 June 2024 and 7 July 2024	2029 →

Following the first round of the 2024 French legislative election on 30 June 2024, runoff elections in each constituency where no candidate received a vote share greater than 50 percent were scheduled for 7 July. Candidates permitted to stand in the runoff elections needed to either come in first or second place in the first round or achieve more than 12.5 percent of the votes of the entire electorate (as opposed to 12.5 percent of the vote share due to low turnout).

== Ain ==
=== 1st constituency ===
Candidate	Party or alliance		First round		Second round	
Candidate	Party or alliance		Votes	%	Votes	%
Christophe Maître	National Rally		23,819	39.37	26,116	43.52
Xavier Breton	The Republicans		14,495	23.96	33,889	56.48
Sébastien Guéraud	New Popular Front	Socialist Party	14,188	23.45		
Vincent Guillermin	Ensemble	Renaissance	7,063	11.68		
Eric Lahy	Far-left	Lutte Ouvrière	419	0.69		
Michael Mendes	Sovereigntist right	Independent	314	0.52		
Cyril Vincent	Sovereigntist right	Independent	197	0.33		
Total			60,495	100.00	60,005	100.00
Valid votes			60,495	97.84	60,005	96.30
Invalid votes			406	0.66	509	0.82
Blank votes			929	1.50	1,797	2.88
Total votes			61,830	100.00	62,311	100.00
Registered voters/turnout			86,843	71.20	96,954	64.27

=== 2nd constituency ===
Candidate	Party or alliance		First round		Second round	
Candidate	Party or alliance		Votes	%	Votes	%
Andréa Kotarac	National Rally		28,189	39.20	31,766	44.91
Romain Daubié	Ensemble	Democratic Movement	17,414	24.21	38,973	55.09
Maxime Meyer	New Popular Front	The Ecologists	16,981	23.61		
Alexandre Nanchi	The Republicans		6,737	9.37		
Olivier Eyraud	Far-right	Reconquête	1,863	2.59		
Vincent Goutagny	Far-left	Lutte Ouvrière	734	1.02		
Total			71,918	100.00	70,739	100.00
Valid votes			71,918	97.93	70,739	96.14
Invalid votes			321	0.44	541	0.74
Blank votes			1,197	1.63	2,297	3.12
Total votes			73,436	100.00	73,577	100.00
Registered voters/turnout			101,874	72.09	101,905	72.20

=== 3rd constituency ===
Candidate	Party or alliance		First round		Second round	
Candidate	Party or alliance		Votes	%	Votes	%
Olga Givernet	Ensemble	Renaissance	17,420	32.43	32,958	63.00
Karine DuBarry	National Rally		17,252	32.11	19,359	37.00
Christian Jolie	New Popular Front	La France Insoumise	13,497	25.12		
Khadija Unal	The Republicans		3,663	6.82		
Annick Veillerot	Sovereigntist right	Debout la France	769	1.43		
Fulgence Kouassi	Independent		630	1.17		
Cécile Maisonette	Far-left	Lutte Ouvrière	455	0.85		
Sofia Tonizzo	Independent		34	0.06		
Total			53,720	100.00	52,317	100.00
Valid votes			53,720	97.74	52,317	95.69
Invalid votes			381	0.69	520	0.95
Blank votes			860	1.56	1,835	3.36
Total votes			54,961	100.00	54,672	100.00
Registered voters/turnout			84,130	65.33	84,168	64.96

=== 4th constituency ===
Candidate	Party or alliance		First round		Second round	
Candidate	Party or alliance		Votes	%	Votes	%
Jérôme Buisson	National Rally		30,221	46.01	33,186	51.42
Christophe Coquelet	Ensemble	Horizons	14,367	21.87	31,347	48.58
Charline Liotier	New Popular Front	The Ecologists	13,113	19.96		
Guy Billoudet	The Republicans		7,179	10.93		
Sylvain Cousson	Far-left	Lutte Ouvrière	706	1.07		
Jérémy Nicaud	Independent		85	0.13		
Yannick Bresson	Independent		17	0.03		
Total			65,688	100.00	64,533	100.00
Valid votes			65,688	97.20	64,533	95.39
Invalid votes			531	0.79	715	1.06
Blank votes			1,361	2.01	2,401	3.55
Total votes			67,580	100.00	67,649	100.00
Registered voters/turnout			96,119	70.31	96,133	70.37

=== 5th constituency ===
Candidate	Party or alliance		First round		Second round	
Candidate	Party or alliance		Votes	%	Votes	%
Marc Chavenent	Union of the far right	The Republicans	20,161	39.12	27,040	57.53
Florence Pisani	New Popular Front	La France Insoumise	12,542	24.34	19,964	42.47
Damien Abad	Miscellaneous right	Independent	9,651	18.73		
Nathalie Descours	Ensemble	Renaissance	6,036	11.71		
Fabrice Bourdin	The Republicans		1,623	3.15		
Sylvie Crozet	Far-left	Lutte Ouvrière	606	1.18		
Thomas Chatelard	Ecologists		484	0.94		
Maria Cristina Patru	Reconquête		429	0.83		
Total			51,532	100.00	47,004	100.00
Valid votes			51,532	97.28	47,004	88.88
Invalid votes			463	0.87	1,248	2.36
Blank votes			978	1.85	4,635	8.76
Total votes			52,973	100.00	52,887	100.00
Registered voters/turnout			77,900	68.00	77,919	67.87
