= Yellow Vests (political nuance) =

Yellow Vests (Gilets Jaunes, GJ or GJL) is a political nuance created by the French Ministry of the Interior in 2020. It applies to lists of candidates affiliated with the Yellow vests protests.

The label was used in the 2020 municipal elections and the 2021 regional and departmental elections and was retired afterwards.

== History ==
The label was created by the Minister of the Interior Christophe Castaner in a circulaire announcing the nuances for the 2020 French municipal elections in response to four different lists claiming to represent the Yellow Vests in the 2019 European Parliament election.

The nuance was used again in the 2021 regional and departmental elections as confirmed in another circulaire by Castaner.

== Usage ==
In the 2020 municipal elections, ten lists ran under the Yellow Vest label; in Vaucluse and Réunion two lists ran, one list was presented each in Gard, Haute-Garonne, Haute-Marne, Hérault, Isère and Meuse. The lists won a total of two seats in municipal councils across France.

In the 2021 departmental elections four pairs were presented in Haute-Savoie, and one each in Manche and in Gard. No pair made it to the second round.

The label was not renewed after the departmental elections.

== See Also ==
- Miscellaneous left
