= Finistère's 7th constituency =

Constituency of the National Assembly of France

7th constituency of Finistère
- inline Constituency of the National Assembly of France

- Constituency in department

- Finistère in France
- Deputy: Liliane Tanguy; RE
- Department: Finistère
- Cantons: Douarnenez, Guilvinec, Plogastel-Saint-Germain, Pont-Croix, Pont-l'Abbé

The 7th constituency of Finistère is a French legislative constituency in the Finistère département. Like the other 576 French constituencies, it elects one MP using the two-round system, with a run-off if no candidate receives over 50% of the vote in the first round.

== Historic representation ==
Election	Member	Party
1988	Ambroise Guellec	UDF
1993	Ambroise Guellec	UDF
1997	Jacqueline Lazard	PS
2002	Hélène Tanguy	UMP
2007	Annick Le Loch	PS
2012	Annick Le Loch	PS
2017	Liliane Tanguy	LREM
2022	Liliane Tanguy	LREM
2024	Liliane Tanguy	RE

== Election results ==
=== 2024 ===
Candidate	Party	Alliance	First round			Second round		
Candidate	Party	Alliance	Votes	%	+/–	Votes	%	+/–
Jugdeep Harvinder	LFI	NFP	18,952	31.06	-3.69	21,041	34.25	-13.50
Liliana Tanguy	RE	ENS	18,709	30.66	-0.57	23,310	37.94	-14.31
Annick Alanou	RN		15,927	26.10	+13.63	17,084	27.81	N/A
Marc Raher	LR		4,470	7.32	-4.76			
Aela Malet	REG		1,135	1.86	+1.08			
Régis Debliqui	LO		972	1.59	+0.17			
Jacques Tanguy	DSV		861	1.41	+0.89			
Valid votes			61,026	97.52	-0.28	61,435	96.91	+4.15
Blank votes			1,032	1.65	+0.16	1,379	2.18	-2.58
Null votes			521	0.83	+0.12	577	0.91	-1.57
Turnout			62,579	74.76	+19.74	63,391	75.76	+20.62
Abstentions			21,122	25.24	-19.74	20,285	24.24	-20.62
Registered voters			83,701			83,676		
Source: Ministry of the Interior, Le Monde
Result						RE HOLD		

=== 2022 ===
Legislative Election 2022: Finistère's 7th constituency
Party	Candidate	Votes	%	±%
LREM (Ensemble)	Liliane Tanguy	14,001	31.23	-6.85
LFI (NUPÉS)	Yolande Bouin	13,443	29.99	+2.04
RN	Franck Nicolas	5,589	12.47	+5.79
LR (UDC)	Eric Le Guen	5,416	12.08	−9.36
UDB	Maxime Touze	2,133	4.76	N/A
REC	Yann Leriche	1,292	2.88	N/A
R!	Jacques Tanguy	1,031	2.30	N/A
Others	N/A	1,923	4.29	
Turnout		44,828	55.02	−1.45
2nd round result
LREM (Ensemble)	Liliane Tanguy	22,266	52.25	-10.70
LFI (NUPÉS)	Yolande Bouin	20,348	47.75	N/A
Turnout		42,614	55.14	+7.85
LREM hold				

=== 2017 ===
Candidate	Label	First round		Second round	
Candidate	Label	Votes	%	Votes	%
Liliane Tanguy	REM	16,894	38.08	20,611	62.95
Didier Guillon	LR	7,536	16.98	12,133	37.05
Roland Jaouen	FI	6,491	14.63		
Florence Crom	PS	4,043	9.11		
Agnès Belbéoc'h	FN	2,963	6.68		
Christophe Roumier	UDI	1,977	4.46		
Jean Cathala	ECO	1,870	4.21		
Monique Le Berre	REG	1,221	2.75		
Alice Roudaut	EXG	445	1.00		
Bernard Le Guen	REG	347	0.78		
Sylvie Joncour	DVG	306	0.69		
Bruno Grognet	DIV	276	0.62		
Votes		44,369	100.00	32,744	100.00
Valid votes		44,369	97.74	32,744	86.16
Blank votes		651	1.43	3,807	10.02
Null votes		376	0.83	1,452	3.82
Turnout		45,396	56.47	38,003	47.29
Abstentions		34,987	43.53	42,362	52.71
Registered voters		80,383		80,365	
Source: Ministry of the Interior

=== 2012 ===
2012 legislative election in Finistere's 7th constituency
Candidate	Party	First round		Second round	
Candidate	Party	Votes	%	Votes	%
Annick Le Loch	PS	22,563	44.76%	30,004	61.01%
Didier Guillon	UMP	11,090	22.00%	19,176	38.99%
Michel Canevet	AC	7,589	15.06%		
Françoise Pencalet-Kerivel	FG	3,415	6.77%		
Evelyne Delgrange	FN	3,087	6.12%		
Janick Moriceau	EELV	2,057	4.08%		
Jean Jouanno	AEI	386	0.77%		
Serge Defrance	LO	221	0.44%		
Valid votes		50,408	98.94%	49,180	97.30%
Spoilt and null votes		542	1.06%	1,366	2.70%
Votes cast / turnout		50,950	63.80%	50,546	63.30%
Abstentions		28,910	36.20%	29,310	36.70%
Registered voters		79,860	100.00%	79,856	100.00%

=== 2007 ===
Legislative Election 2007: Finistère's 7th constituency
Party	Candidate	Votes	%	±%
UMP	Hélène Tanguy	19,242	36.33	
PS	Annick Le Loch	17,020	32.13	
MoDem	Michel Canevet	10,333	19.51	
PCF	Louis Guirriec	2,224	4.20	
LV	Elisabeth Hascoet	2,158	4.07	
Others	N/A	1,990		
Turnout		53,638	67.64	
2nd round result
PS	Annick Le Loch	27,042	51.01	
UMP	Hélène Tanguy	25,970	48.99	
Turnout		54,314	68.50	
PS gain from UMP				

=== 2002 ===
Legislative Election 2002: Finistère's 7th constituency
Party	Candidate	Votes	%	±%
PS	Jacqueline Lazard	16,795	32.38	
UMP	Hélène Tanguy	15,707	30.28	
UDF	Michel Canevet	9,604	18.51	
FN	Cecile Storez	2,261	4.36	
PCF	Hugues Tupin	1,888	3.64	
LV	Janick Moriceau	1,565	3.02	
Others	N/A	4,052		
Turnout		52,631	68.63	
2nd round result
UMP	Hélène Tanguy	27,489	53.30	
PS	Jacqueline Lazard	24,084	46.70	
Turnout		53,020	69.16	
UMP gain from PS				

=== 1997 ===
Legislative Election 1997: Finistère's 7th constituency
Party	Candidate	Votes	%	±%
UDF	Ambroise Guellec	20,098	40.32	
PS	Jacqueline Lazard	14,173	28.43	
PCF	Hugues Tupin	5,206	10.44	
FN	Marcel Saoutic	3,955	7.93	
LV	Janick Moriceau	3,173	6.37	
GE	Christophe Playon	1,647	3.30	
DVD	Pierre Le Bris	1,594	3.20	
Turnout		52,356	69.83	
2nd round result
PS	Jacqueline Lazard	26,849	50.12	
UDF	Ambroise Guellec	26,724	49.88	
Turnout		56,017	74.73	
PS gain from UDF				

== Sources ==
- Official results of French elections from 1998: "Résultats électoraux officiels en France" (in French). Archived from the original on 20 December 2011.
