= Goasdoué =

Goasdoué is a surname, and may refer to:

Goasdoué means man of God in Breton and derives from gwaz which means man and doue which means God. (cf. Gwaz and Doue)

- Tanguy Goasdoué - French actor
- Jean-Jacques Goasdoué - French businessman, founder of Transports Frigorifiques Européens
- Yann Goasdoué - Breton musician
- Yves Goasdoué - French politician
