= Daubié =

Daubié is a French surname. Notable people with the surname include:

- Julie-Victoire Daubié (1824–1874), French journalist
- Romain Daubié (born 1980), French lawyer and politician
