= Sovereign right =

Sovereign right may refer to:

- Sovereign right, a principle in international law under the Westphalian system
- Sovereign Right (French politics), a French political label
