= Haut-Rhin's 2nd constituency =

Constituency of the National Assembly of France

2nd constituency of the Haut-Rhin
- inline Constituency of the National Assembly of France

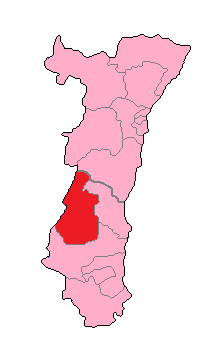
- Deputy: Hubert Ott; MoDem
- Department: Haut-Rhin
- Cantons: Kaysersberg, Lapoutroie, Munster, Ribeauvill, Rouffach, Sainte-Marie-aux-Mines, Wintzenheim, Guebwiller
- Registered voters: 91136

The 2nd constituency of the Haut-Rhin is a French legislative constituency in the Haut-Rhin département, France.

== Description ==
This constituency in Alsace consists of the small towns and villages to the north and west of Colmar including Munster and Sainte-Marie-aux-Mines. It rises into the foothills of the Vosges Mountains and borders Lorraine to the west.

Traditionally it has been strongly conservative supporting moderate parties of the centre-right and the Gaullist RPR/UMP.

== Historic Representation ==
Election	Member	Party
1986	Proportional representation - no election by constituency	
1988	Jean-Paul Fuchs	UDF
1993	Jean-Paul Fuchs	UDF
1997	Marc Dumoulin	RPR
2002	Jean-Louis Christ	UMP
2007	Jean-Louis Christ	UMP
2012	Jean-Louis Christ	UMP
2017	Jacques Cattin	LR
2022	Hubert Ott	MoDem

== Election results ==
=== 2024 ===
Legislative Election 2024: Haut-Rhin's 2nd constituency
Party	Candidate	Votes	%	±%
DIV	Claudine Sébert	679	1.11	N/A
DIV	Tiffany Straub	1,641	2.69	N/A
Volt	Nathan Doude Van Troostwijk	163	0.27	N/A
LFI (NFP)	Lilian Bourgeois	9,228	15.14	−0.65
LR	Daniel Klack	5,012	8.22	−12.47
LO	Pascal Neuschwanger	280	0.46	N/A
MoDem (Ensemble)	Hubert Ott	19,785	32.46	+3.95
RN	Nathalie Aubert	22,049	36.17	+17.83
REC	Victor Olry	477	0.78	−2.09
UL	Jean-Marc Burgel	1,645	2.70	−1.60
Turnout		60,959	97.63	+50.22
Registered electors		92,476		
2nd round result
MoDem	Hubert Ott	34,907	57.82	+4.92
RN	Nathalie Aubert	25,463	42.18	N/A
Turnout		60,370	95.82	+55.15
Registered electors		92,497		
MoDem hold		Swing		

=== 2022 ===
Legislative Election 2022: Haut-Rhin's 2nd constituency
Party	Candidate	Votes	%	±%
MoDem (Ensemble)	Hubert Ott	12,272	28.51	-7.41
LR (UDC)	Jacques Cattin	8,907	20.69	-3.54
RN	Nathalie Aubert	7,893	18.34	+5.66
LFI (NUPÉS)	Lilian Bourgeois	6,797	15.79	+2.40
UL (REG)	Jean-Georges Trouillet	1,849	4.30	−3.14
DVE	Gabriel Schermann	1,462	3.40	N/A
REC	Emily Gravier	1,236	2.87	N/A
LP (UPF)	Sophie Vanackere	909	2.11	+0.80
Others	N/A	1,723	-	−
Turnout		43,048	47.41	−0.35
2nd round result
MoDem (Ensemble)	Hubert Ott	17,947	52.90	+4.29
LR (UDC)	Jacques Cattin	15,977	47.10	−4.29
Turnout		33,924	40.67	+0.57
MoDem gain from LR				

=== 2017 ===
Legislative Election 2017: Haut-Rhin's 2nd constituency
Party	Candidate	Votes	%	±%
LREM	Hubert Ott	15,826	35.92	
LR	Jacques Cattin	10,679	24.23	
FN	Grégory Stich	5,586	12.68	
REG	Daniel Loewert (Unser Land)	3,278	7.44	
LFI	Christelle Millet	3,156	7.16	
EELV	Laurent Dreyfus	2,523	5.73	
Others	N/A	3,017		
Turnout		44,065	47.76	
2nd round result
LR	Jacques Cattin	19,001	51.39	
LREM	Hubert Ott	17,974	48.61	
Turnout		36,975	40.10	
LR hold				

=== 2012 ===
Legislative Election 2012: Haut-Rhin's 2nd constituency
Party	Candidate	Votes	%	±%
UMP	Jean-Louis Christ	23,454	45.92	
EELV	Henri Stoll	10,801	21.15	
FN	Julia Abraham	9,887	19.36	
DVG	Fabien Becker	4,673	9.15	
FG	Guy Buecher	1,264	2.47	
Others	N/A	995		
Turnout		51,074	56.04	
2nd round result
UMP	Jean-Louis Christ	28,988	63.55	
EELV	Henri Stoll	16,626	36.45	
Turnout		45,614	50.05	
UMP hold				

=== 2002 ===
Results of the 9 June and 16 June 2002 French National Assembly election in Haut-Rhin’s 2nd Constituency
Candidate	Party		1st round		2nd round	
Candidate	Party		Votes	%	Votes	%
J. Louis Christ	Union for a Presidential Majority	UMP	10,119	23.63	17,398	59.60
Pierre Hussherr	Miscellaneous Right	DVD	5,498	12.84	11,794	40.40
Thierry Speitel	Miscellaneous Right	DVD	4,518	10.55		
Christiane Ingold	National Front	FN	4,345	10.15		
Jacques Loëss	Radical Party of the Left	PRG	4,138	9.66		
Guy Daessle	Miscellaneous Right	DVD	3,926	9.17		
Christophe Hartmann	The Greens	LV	2,841	6.63		
Christian Chaton	National Republican Movement	MNR	2,782	6.50		
Bruno Ciofi	Republican Pole	PR	1,111	2.59		
Guy Buecher	Communist Party	PCF	725	1.69		
M. Helene Pillet	Ecologist	ECO	610	1.42		
Eric Talles	Independent	DIV	608	1.42		
Christophe Husser	Movement for France	MPF	582	1.36		
Vivette Michea	Workers’ Struggle	LO	547	1.28		
Vincent Toscani	Miscellaneous Right	DVD	241	0.56		
Dominique Monnot	Hunting, Fishing, Nature and Traditions	CPNT	237	0.55		
Total			42,828	100%	29,192	100%
Registered voters			71,593		71,589	
Blank/Void ballots			1,282	2.91%	4,197	12.57%
Turnout			44,110	61.61%	33,389	46.64%
Abstentions			27,483	38.39%	38,200	53.36%
Result					UMP HOLD	
