= Orne's 3rd constituency =

Constituency of the National Assembly of France

3rd constituency of Orne
- inline Constituency of the National Assembly of France

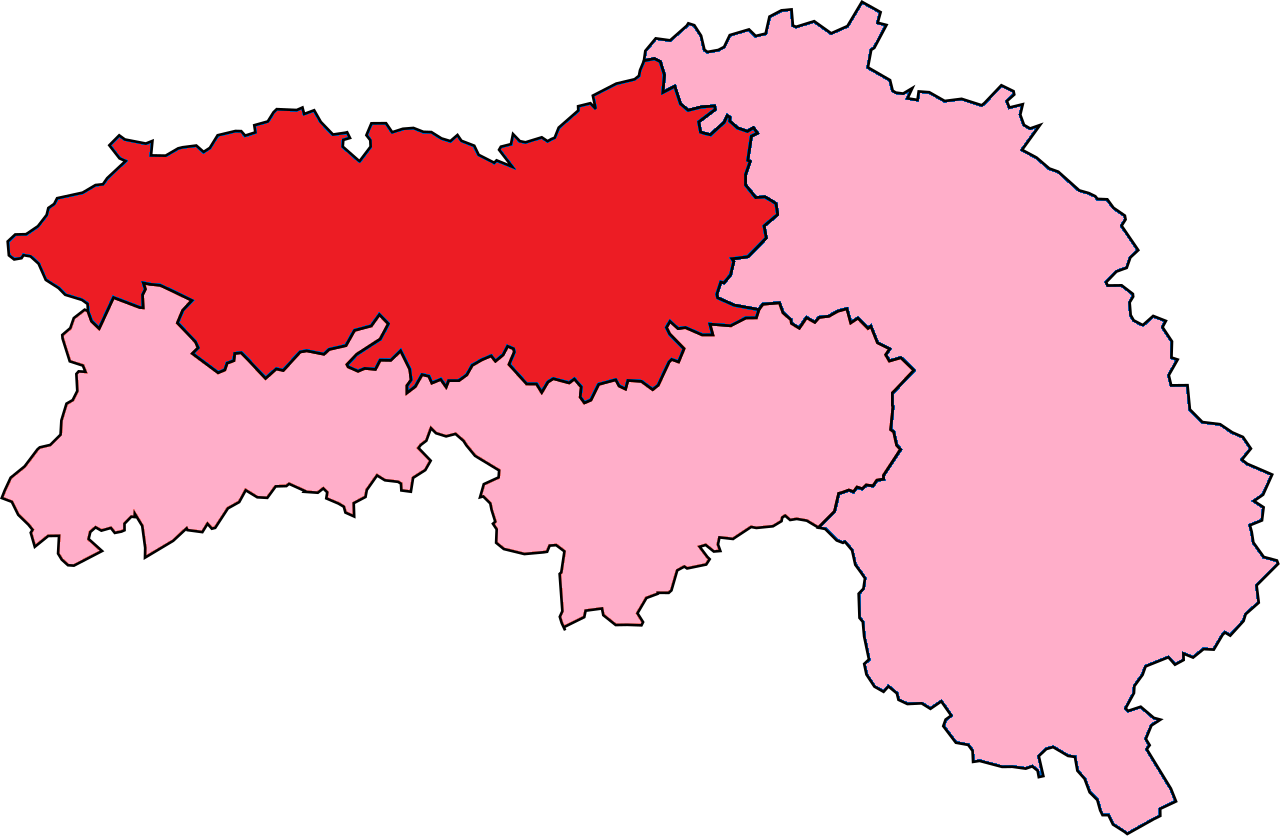
- Orne's 2nd Constituency shown within Orne

- Orne in France
- Deputy: Jérôme Nury; LR
- Department: Orne
- Cantons: Argentan Est, Argentan-Ouest, Athis-de-l'Orne, Briouze, Ecouché, Exmes, Flers Nord, Flers Sud, Messei, Mortrée, Putanges-Pont-Ecrepin, Tinchebray, Trun
- Registered voters: 71645

The 2nd constituency of the Orne (French: Troisième circonscription de l'Orne) is a French legislative constituency in the Orne département. Like the other 576 French constituencies, it elects one MP using a two round electoral system.

== Description ==
The 2nd Constituency of the Orne covers the north western portion of the department including the town of Argentan.

Historically the seat has lent towards the right, electing left wing candidates in only 1988 and 2012. Longstanding deputy Hubert Bassot died whilst in office in 1995, his widow Sylvia Bassot subsequently also held the seat.

== Assembly Members ==
Election	Member	Party
1988	Michel Lambert	PS
1993	Hubert Bassot	UDF
1995	Jean-Luc Gouyon	UDF
1997	Sylvia Bassot	UDF
2002	Sylvia Bassot	UMP
2007	Sylvia Bassot	UMP
2012	Yves Goasdoué	DVG
2017	Jérôme Nury	LR
2022	Jérôme Nury	LR

== Election results ==
=== 2024 ===
Legislative Election 2024: Orne's 3rd constituency
Party	Candidate	Votes	%	±%
LO	Arnaud Gautier	857	1.81	n/a
DVG (NFP)	Lore Helloco	9.988	21.07	n/a
RN	Ludmila Petchenina	15,364	32.41	+14.84
DVD	Jérôme Nury	20,701	43.67	−5.17
REC	Sylvia Henot	488	1.03	−1.53
Turnout		47,398	97.72	+47.44
Registered electors		70,653		
2nd round result
DVD	Jérôme Nury	29,782	64.73	+21.06
RN	Ludmila Petchenina	16,226	35.27	2.86
Turnout		46,008	96.06	−1.66
Registered electors		70,656		
DVD hold		Swing		

=== 2022 ===
Legislative Election 2022: Orne's 3rd constituency
Party	Candidate	Votes	%	±%
LR (UDC)	Jérôme Nury	13,050	37.38	+3.91
RN	Anthony Fremont	6,135	17.57	+4.18
LFI (NUPÉS)	Mehdi Khemari	6,090	17.44	+2.20
HOR (Ensemble)	Solène Gibault	4,787	13.71	−20.93
LREM	Vincent Beaumont	2,033	5.82	N/A
REC	Claire-Emmanuelle Gauer	894	2.56	N/A
Others	N/A	1,923	5.51	
Turnout		34,912	50.28	−2.02
2nd round result
LR (UDC)	Jérôme Nury	21,603	69.66	+13.58
RN	Anthony Fremont	9,411	30.34	N/A
Turnout		31,014	47.39	+1.60
LR hold				

=== 2017 ===
Legislative Election 2017: Orne's 3rd constituency
Party	Candidate	Votes	%	±%
LREM	Isabelle Boscher	12,980	34.64	
LR	Jérôme Nury	12,542	33.47	
FN	Katia Fremont	5,019	13.39	
LFI	Clément Bujarrabal	3,378	9.01	
EELV	Corinne Malignac	1,488	3.97	
PCF	Jean Charelais	846	2.26	
Others	N/A	1,220		
Turnout		37,473	52.30	
2nd round result
LR	Jérôme Nury	18,397	56.08	
LREM	Isabelle Boscher	14,407	43.92	
Turnout		32,804	45.79	
LR gain from DVG				

=== 2012 ===
2012 legislative election in Orne's 3rd constituency
Candidate	Party	First round		Second round	
Candidate	Party	Votes	%	Votes	%
Yves Goasdoue	PS dissident	17,174	38.62%	22,968	50.99%
Jérôme Nury	UMP	16,509	37.13%	22,080	49.01%
Francine Lavanry	FN	4,843	10.89%		
Omar Ayad	EELV–PS	1,874	4.21%		
Jean Chatelais	FG	1,694	3.81%		
Odile Lecrosnier	MoDem	586	1.32%		
Denis Jacquet	NC	430	0.97%		
Jacques Bessin	AEI	354	0.80%		
Grégory Cordurie	NPA	281	0.63%		
Marie-Antoinette Caldairou	DLR	278	0.63%		
Arnaud Gautier	LO	258	0.58%		
Jérôme De Carrara	CNIP	187	0.42%		
Valid votes		44,468	98.34%	45,048	97.51%
Spoilt and null votes		749	1.66%	1,150	2.49%
Votes cast / turnout		45,217	62.34%	46,198	63.69%
Abstentions		27,320	37.66%	26,336	36.31%
Registered voters		72,537	100.00%	72,534	100.00%
