= Sylvia Bassot =

French politician

Member of the National Assembly for Orne's 3rd constituency
- In office 31 March 1996 – 25 June 2012
- Preceded by: Jean-Luc Gouyon
- Succeeded by: Yves Goasdoué

Member of the Regional Council of Lower Normandy
- In office 29 March 2004 – 22 March 2010
- President: Philippe Duron; Laurent Beauvais

Personal details
- Born: Sylvia Marie Huffer; 18 December 1940 16th arrondissement of Paris, France
- Died: 3 January 2014 (aged 73) 15th arrondissement of Paris, France
- Resting place: Tinchebray-Bocage
- Party: UMP
- Spouse: Hubert Bassot

Sylvia Bassot (French: [silvja baso]; 18 December 1940 – 3 January 2014) was a member of the National Assembly of France from 1996 until 2012. She represented the Orne department, and was a member of the Union for a Popular Movement.

== Biography ==
Wife of Hubert Bassot, UDF deputy between 1978 and 1981, who regained the 3rd constituency of Orne in 1993, she succeeded him in a by-election in 1996 after his death and the removal from office of his deputy Jean-Luc Gouyon, being elected against François Doubin.

She also succeeds him on the general council for the canton of Tinchebray, with 63.86% of the votes in the first round.

Re-elected as a deputy in 1997, 2002, and 2007, she is a member of the Union for a Popular Movement group. An investigation by L'Expansion reveals that she is the least present and least active deputy in the National Assembly. She did not run for re-election in 2012 and failed to get her protégé, Jérôme Nury, to succeed her.

Sylvia Bassot died on January 3, 2014, in Paris after a long illness. She is buried in the cemetery of the commune of Tinchebray, where her funeral took place on January 9, 2014.
