= Jura's 1st constituency =

Constituency of the National Assembly of France

1st constituency of Jura
- inline Constituency of the National Assembly of France

- Constituency in Department

- Jura in France
- Deputy: Danielle Brulebois; RE
- Department: Jura
- Cantons: (pre-2015) Arinthod, Beaufort, Bletterans, Chaumergy, Conliège, Lons-le-Saunier-Nord, Lons-le-Saunier-Sud, Orgelet, Poligny, Saint-Amour, Saint-Julien, Sellières, Voiteur
- Registered voters: 65,422

The 1st constituency of Jura is a French legislative constituency in the Jura département.

The 1st constituency of Jura covers the south western portion of the department and includes the prefecture Lons-le-Saunier.

== Deputies ==
Election	Member	Party
1986	Proportional representation – no election by constituency	
1988	Alain Brune	PS
1993	Jacques Pélissard	RPR
1997	Jacques Pélissard	RPR
2002	Jacques Pélissard	UMP
2007	Jacques Pélissard	UMP
2012	Jacques Pélissard	UMP
2017	Danielle Brulebois	LREM
2022	Danielle Brulebois	LREM
2024	Danielle Brulebois	RE

== Election results ==
=== 2024 ===
Candidate	Party	Alliance	First round			Second round		
Candidate	Party	Alliance	Votes	%	+/–	Votes	%	+/–
Valérie Graby	RN		17,517	39.03	+17.13	19,050	43.15	new
Danielle Brulebois	REN	Ensemble	16,231	36.16	-0.57	25,097	56.85	+0.63
Anthony Brondel	LFI	NFP	10,350	23.06	-1.16	withdrew		
Johanne Morel	LO		786	1.75	+0.06			
Votes			44,886	100.00		44,147	100.00	
Valid votes			44,886	96.75	-0.52	44,147	94.39	+3.29
Blank votes			1,025	2.21	+0.44	1,952	4.17	-1.81
Null votes			481	1.04	+0.08	674	1.44	-1.48
Turnout			46,392	71.45	+18.74	46,773	72.04	+21.50
Abstentions			18,533	28.55	-18.74	18,154	27.96	-21.50
Registered voters			64,925			64,927		
Result			RE HOLD					

=== 2022 ===
Legislative Election 2022: Jura's 1st constituency
Party	Candidate	Votes	%	±%
LREM (Ensemble)	Danielle Brulebois	12,247	36.73	+1.19
LFI (NUPÉS)	Anthony Brondel	9,467	28.40	+3.77
RN	Thomas Bouhali	7,301	21.90	+9.52
LR (UDC)	Martine Ludi	2,556	7.67	−10.06
REC	Thierry Perret	1,203	3.61	N/A
LO	Johanne Morel	565	1.69	+1.01
Turnout		33,339	52.71	−1.29
2nd round result
LREM (Ensemble)	Danielle Brulebois	16,833	56.22	-1.66
LFI (NUPÉS)	Anthony Brondel	13,108	43.78	N/A
Turnout		29,941	50.54	+3.41
LREM hold				

=== 2017 ===
Candidate	Label	First round		Second round	
Candidate	Label	Votes	%	Votes	%
Danielle Brulebois	REM	12,266	35.54	15,498	57.88
Cyrille Brero	LR	6,120	17.73	11,278	42.12
Gabriel Amard	FI	4,906	14.21		
Jean-Paul Ecard	FN	4,274	12.38		
Marc-Henri Duvernet	PS	3,596	10.42		
Gilles Moriconi	DLF	1,213	3.51		
Benjamin Marraud des Grottes	DVD	1,011	2.93		
Gérard Dobelli	ECO	526	1.52		
Johanne Morel	EXG	235	0.68		
Ramazan Ipek	DIV	186	0.54		
Alain Janniaux	DIV	180	0.52		
Michel Lapierre	DVD	0	0.00		
Votes		34,513	100.00	26,776	100.00
Valid votes		34,513	97.68	26,776	86.84
Blank votes		607	1.72	2,944	9.55
Null votes		214	0.61	1,115	3.62
Turnout		35,334	54.00	30,835	47.13
Abstentions		30,095	46.00	34,587	52.87
Registered voters		65,429		65,422	
Source: Ministry of the Interior

=== 2012 ===
2012 legislative election in Jura's 1st constituency
Candidate	Party	First round		Second round	
Candidate	Party	Votes	%	Votes	%
Jacques Pelissard	UMP	16,718	40.91%	20,912	52.14%
Danielle Brulebois	PS	13,459	32.94%	19,193	47.86%
Jean-Pierre Mouget	FN	4,873	11.93%		
Nelly Faton	FG	2,513	6.15%		
Patrice Bau	EELV	1,640	4.01%		
Céline Duneufgermain	DLR	446	1.09%		
Arnaud Deborne	MRC	375	0.92%		
Sylvie Bourgey	AEI	303	0.74%		
Aline Carton	NPA	218	0.53%		
Gérard Lacroix		208	0.51%		
Odile Koller	LO	108	0.26%		
Valid votes		40,861	98.45%	40,105	97.57%
Spoilt and null votes		645	1.55%	1,200	2.92%
Votes cast / turnout		41,506	63.79%	41,305	63.49%
Abstentions		23,563	36.21%	23,748	36.51%
Registered voters		65,069	100.00%	65,053	100.00%

=== 2007 ===
Legislative Election 2007: Jura's 1st constituency
Party	Candidate	Votes	%	±%
UMP	Jacques Pelissard	20,618	51.17	
PS	Francine Benoist	8,759	21.74	
MoDem	Pascal Bride	2,762	6.85	
LV	Patrice Bau	2,170	5.39	
PCF	Sylvaine Pernet	1,589	3.94	
FN	Jean-Pierre Mouget	1,555	3.86	
Others	N/A	2,683	-	
Turnout		41,055	63.61	
UMP hold				

=== 2002 ===
Legislative Election 2002: Jura's 1st constituency
Party	Candidate	Votes	%	±%
UMP	Jacques Pélissard	20,875	50.50	
PS	Yves Colmou	11,557	27.96	
FN	Monique Pêcheur	4,278	10.35	
PCF	Sylviane Pernet	1,790	4.33	
Others	N/A	2,838	-	
Turnout		42,310	67.47	
UMP hold				

=== 1997 ===
Legislative Election 1997: Jura's 1st constituency
Party	Candidate	Votes	%	±%
RPR	Jacques Pélissard	14,629	37.48	
PS	Yves Colmou	9,954	25.50	
FN	Luc Bégean	5,394	13.82	
PCF	Sylviane Pernet	3,538	9.07	
MEI	Jean-Luc Mayet	1,427	3.66	
LDI	Denis Conte	1,075	2.75	
LO	Dominique Revoy	1,041	2.67	
SEGA	Patrick Pierlot	856	2.19	
DIV	Maurice Girod	610	1.56	
DVD	Noëlle Doridant	504	1.29	
Turnout		41,900	69.29	
2nd round result
RPR	Jacques Pélissard	22,255	52.98	
PS	Yves Colmou	19,751	47.02	
Turnout		45,045	74.50	
RPR hold				

== Sources ==
- French Interior Ministry results website: "Résultats électoraux officiels en France" (in French).
- "Résultats électoraux officiels en France" (in French). 2017.
