= Jura's 3rd constituency =

Constituency of the National Assembly of France

3rd constituency of Jura
- inline Constituency of the National Assembly of France

- Jura's 3rd Constituency shown within Jura

- Jura in France
- Deputy: Justine Gruet; LR
- Department: Jura
- Cantons: Arbois, Chaussin, Chemin, Dampierre, Dole-Nord-Est, Dole-Sud-Ouest, Gendrey, Montbarrey, Montmirey-le-Château, Rochefort-sur-Nenon, Salins-les-Bains, Villers-Farlay.
- Registered voters: 70,218

The 3rd constituency of Jura is a French legislative constituency in the Jura département.

== Description ==
The 3rd constituency of Jura covers the north of the department and includes its largest town Dole.

Whilst now held comfortably by the UMP the seat has historically swung between left and right. Between 1997 and 2002 the seat was held by Dominique Voynet the Green candidate in the 2007 French presidential election.

== Deputies ==
Election	Member	Party
1986	Proportional representation – no election by constituency	
1988	Jean-Pierre Santa-Cruz	PS
1993	Gilbert Barbier	UDF
1997	Dominique Voynet	Les Verts
2002	Jean-Marie Sermier	UMP
2007	Jean-Marie Sermier	UMP
2012	Jean-Marie Sermier	UMP
2017	Jean-Marie Sermier	LR
2022	Justine Gruet	LR
2024	Justine Gruet	LR

== Election results ==
=== 2024 ===
Candidate	Party	Alliance	First round			Second round		
Candidate	Party	Alliance	Votes	%	+/–	Votes	%	+/–
Aurore Vuillemin-Plancon	RN		19,354	39.73	+16.58	20,915	43.81	new
Justine Gruet	LR	UDC	16,727	34.34	+8.72	26,822	56.19	-2.27
Hervé Prat	LE	NFP	11,833	24.29	-0.55	withdrew		
Dominique Revoy	LO		796	1.63	+0.20			
Votes			48,711	100.00		47,737	100.00	
Valid votes			48,711	97.60	-0.12	47,737	94.95	+1.43
Blank votes			791	1.58	-0.04	1,860	3.70	-0.56
Null votes			408	0.82	+0.15	680	1.35	-0.87
Turnout			49,910	71.09	+19.19	50,277	71.60	+21.19
Abstentions			20,295	28.91	-19.19	19,941	28.40	-21.19
Registered voters			70,205			70,218		
Result			LR HOLD					

=== 2022 ===
Legislative Election 2022: Jura's 3rd constituency
Party	Candidate	Votes	%	±%
LR (UDC)	Justine Gruet	9,144	25.62	-7.13
EELV (NUPÉS)	Hervé Prat	8,865	24.84	+1.78
RN	Aurore Vuillemin-Plançon	8,264	23.15	+7.71
MoDem (Ensemble)	Anne-Colette Prost	5,349	14.99	−11.49
PS	Rim El Mezoughi*	1,589	4.45	N/A
REC	Nathalie Blaise	1,162	3.26	N/A
Others	N/A	1,320	-	−
Turnout		35,693	51.90	−2.21
2nd round result
LR (UDC)	Justine Gruet	19,397	58.46	+0.19
EELV (NUPÉS)	Hervé Prat	13,784	41.54	N/A
Turnout		33,181	50.41	+1.57
LR hold				

* El Mezoughi stood as a dissident PS member, without the support of the party or the NUPES alliance.

=== 2017 ===
Candidate	Label	First round		Second round	
Candidate	Label	Votes	%	Votes	%
Jean-Marie Sermier	LR	12,068	32.75	17,679	58.27
Paul-Henri Bard	MoDem	9,758	26.48	12,660	41.73
Stéphane Montrelay	FN	5,690	15.44		
Jean-Bernard Marcuzzi	FI	5,280	14.33		
Laurence Bernier	PCF	2,848	7.73		
Sylvie Viard	DLF	540	1.47		
Dominique Revoy	EXG	368	1.00		
Véronique Henry	DIV	200	0.54		
Ali Kurt	DIV	98	0.27		
Votes		36,850	100.00	30,339	100.00
Valid votes		36,850	98.00	30,339	89.39
Blank votes		555	1.48	2,436	7.18
Null votes		197	0.52	1,165	3.43
Turnout		37,602	54.11	33,940	48.84
Abstentions		31,895	45.89	35,557	51.16
Registered voters		69,497		69,497	
Source: Ministry of the Interior

=== 2012 ===
2012 legislative election in Jura's 3rd constituency
Candidate	Party	First round		Second round	
Candidate	Party	Votes	%	Votes	%
Jean-Marie Sermier	UMP	16,187	37.65%	22,303	53.18%
Sylvie Laroche	PS	11,116	25.85%	19,641	46.82%
Patrick Viverge	FG	6,339	14.74%		
Ghislaine Fraisse	FN	6,043	14.05%		
Ako Hamdaoui	EELV	1,530	3.56%		
Marie-Thérèse Brocard	MoDem	669	1.56%		
Michèle Philippon	DLR	335	0.78%		
Nicolas Gomet	NPA	324	0.75%		
Dominique Revoy	LO	231	0.54%		
Jacques Berthault	POI	223	0.52%		
Valid votes		42,997	98.57%	41,940	96.71%
Spoilt and null votes		623	1.43%	1,427	3.29%
Votes cast / turnout		43,620	63.85%	43,367	63.48%
Abstentions		24,701	36.15%	24,952	36.52%
Registered voters		68,321	100.00%	68,319	100.00%

=== 2007 ===
Legislative Election 2007: Jura's 3rd constituency
Party	Candidate	Votes	%	±%
UMP	Jean-Marie Sermier	20,222	47.82	
PS	Patrick Viverge	10,694	25.29	
PCF	Michel Gines	3,305	7.82	
MoDem	Fabrice Girardet	2,125	5.03	
FN	Yvonne Leborgne	1,980	4.68	
LV	Marine Ronzani	1,739	4.11	
Others	N/A	2,219	-	
Turnout		42,969	63.30	
2nd round result
UMP	Jean-Marie Sermier	23,153	54.51	
PS	Patrick Viverge	19,325	45.49	
Turnout		43,591	64.32	
UMP hold				

=== 2002 ===
Legislative Election 2002: Jura's 3rd constituency
Party	Candidate	Votes	%	±%
UMP	Jean-Marie Sermier	16,742	38.82	N/A
LV	Dominique Voynet	14,082	32.65	+1.54
FN	Maurice Batail	5,294	12.28	−5.43
DVG	Guy Beaujard	2,299	5.33	N/A
Others	N/A	2,114	-	−
Turnout		44,213	67.58	−6.60
2nd round result
UMP	Jean-Marie Sermier	22,716	55.34	N/A
LV	Dominique Voynet	18,334	44.66	−11.29
Turnout		41,050	65.86	−12.93
UMP gain from LV				

=== 1997 ===
Legislative Election 1997: Jura's 3rd constituency
Party	Candidate	Votes	%	±%
LV	Dominique Voynet	13,847	31.11	
UDF	Gilbert Barbier	12,404	27.87	
FN	Jean-Etienne Normand	7,884	17.71	
PCF	Michel Giniès	5,428	12.20	
LDI	Jacques Perrot	1,416	3.18	
GE	Jean Bordat	1,163	2.61	
LO	Gilles Corol	896	2.01	
Others	N/A	1,468	-	
Turnout		46,842	74.18	
2nd round result
LV	Dominique Voynet	25,847	55.95	
UDF	Gilbert Barbier	20,347	44.05	
Turnout		49,749	78.79	
LV gain from UDF				

== Sources ==
Official results of French elections from 2002: "Résultats électoraux officiels en France" (in French).
