= Jean-Marie Sermier =

French politician

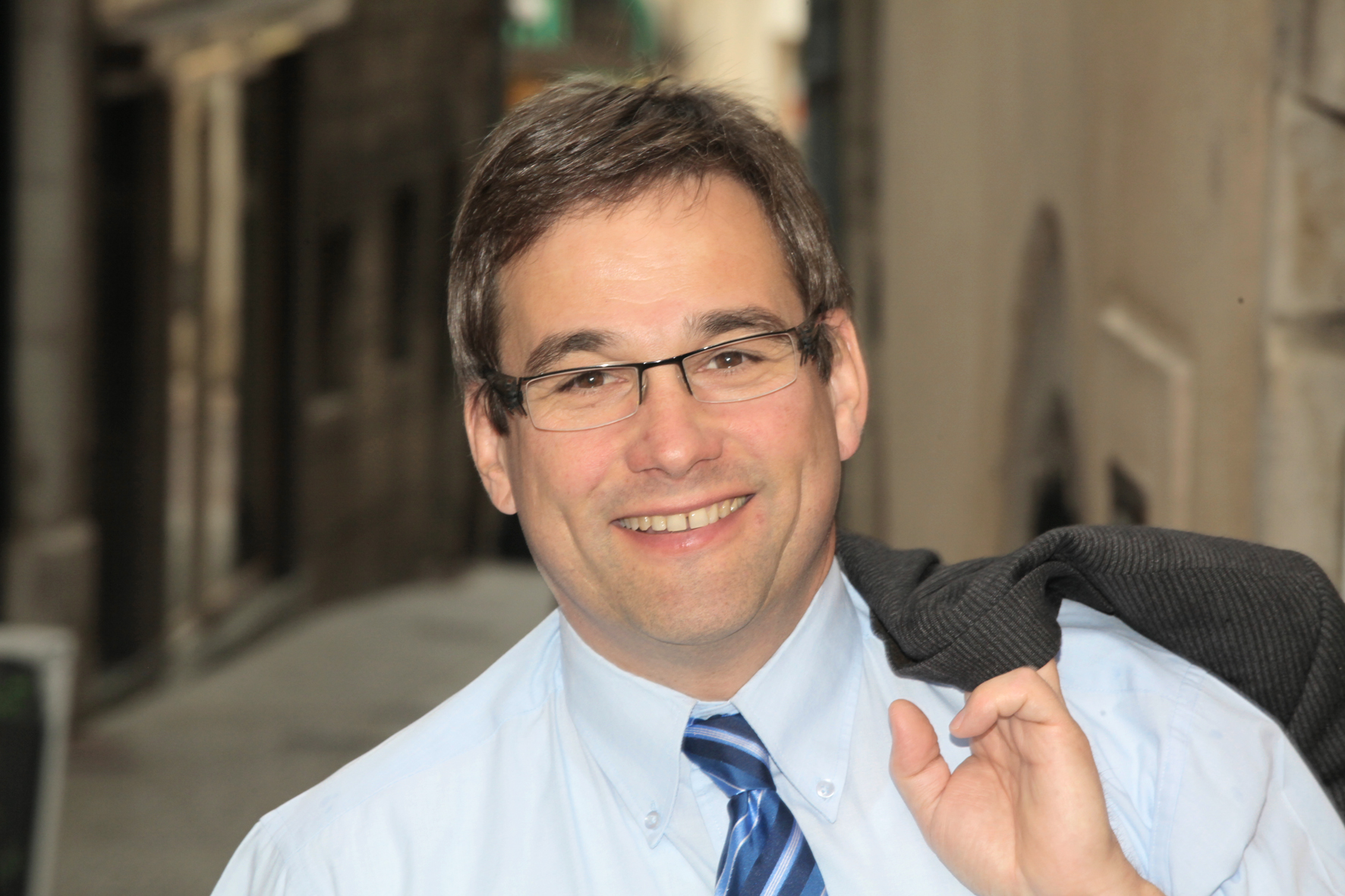
Jean-Marie Sermier

Jean-Marie Sermier (born 5 March 1961 in Nozeroy, Jura) is a Frenchman and a member of the National Assembly of France. He represented Jura's 3rd constituency from 2002 to 2022 as a member of the Republicans.

He didn't seek re-election in the 2022 French legislative election. His seat was won by fellow Republican candidate Justine Gruet.
