= Hubert Ott =

French politician (born 1964)

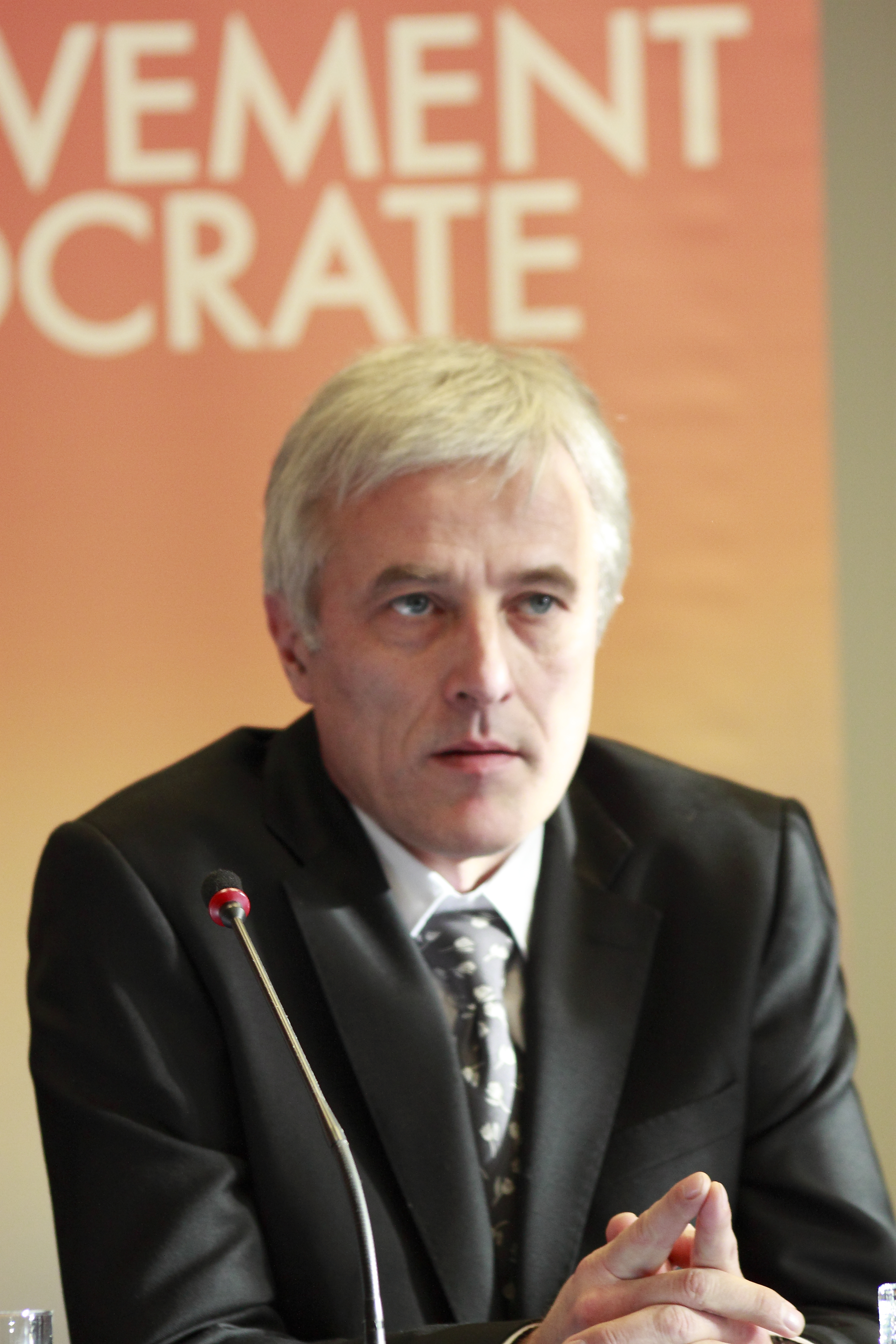

Member of the National Assembly for Haut-Rhin's 2nd constituency
- Incumbent
- Assumed office 22 June 2022
- Preceded by: Jacques Cattin

Personal details
- Born: 6 June 1964 (age 61) Colmar, Haut-Rhin, France
- Party: MoDem

Hubert Ott (French pronunciation: [ybɛʁ ɔt]; born 6 June 1964) is a French politician of the Democratic Movement (MoDem) who has been representing Haut-Rhin's 2nd constituency in the National Assembly since defeating incumbent Jacques Cattin in 2022.

== Political career ==
In parliament, Ott has since been serving on the Committee on Sustainable Development and Regional Planning.

In addition to his committee assignments, Ott is part of the French delegation to the Franco-German Parliamentary Assembly and the French parliamentary friendship groups with Brazil, Cyprus, Cameroon and Romania.

== See also ==
- List of deputies of the 16th National Assembly of France
