= Jacques Cattin =

French politician (born 1958)

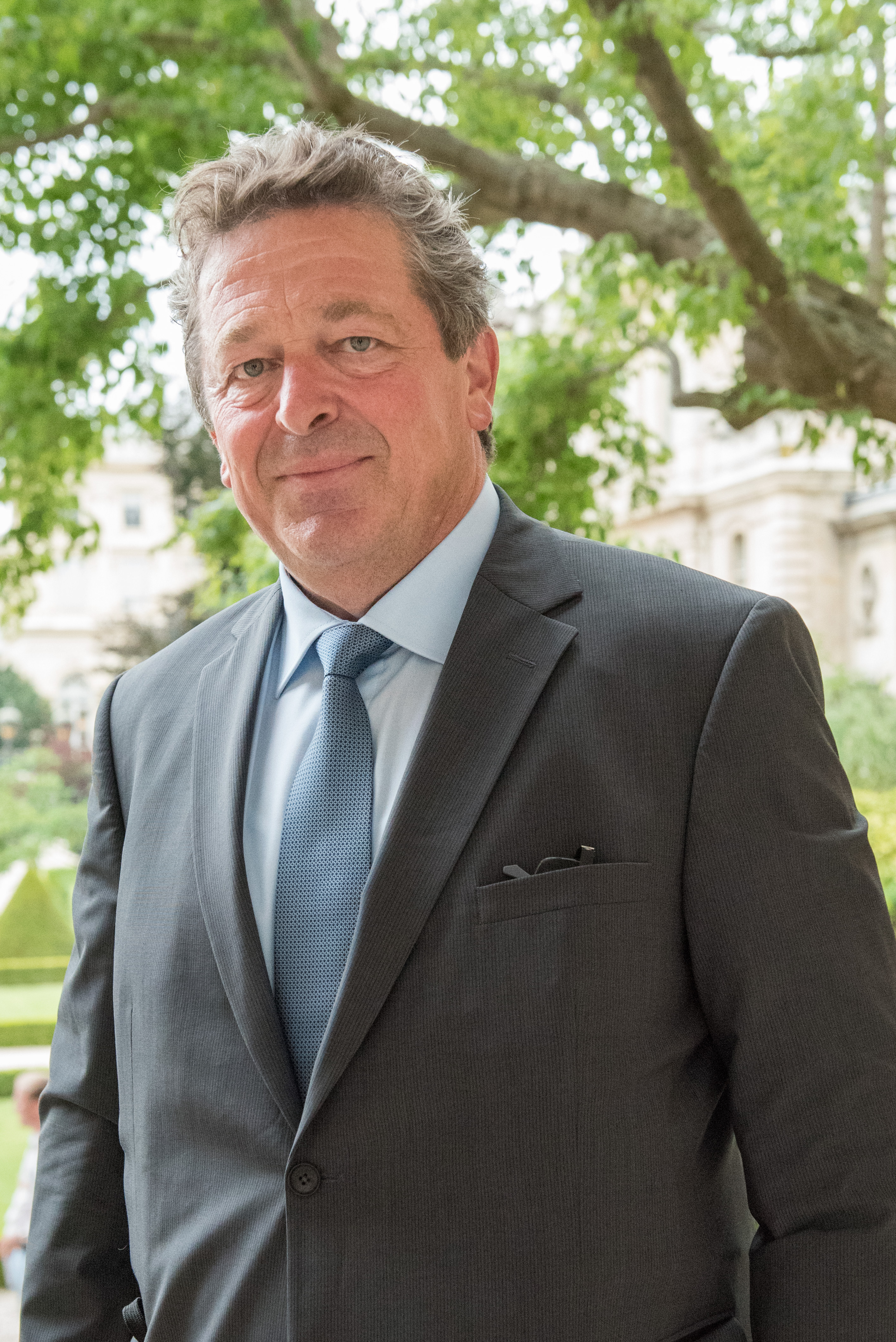

Deputy for Haut-Rhin's 2nd constituency
- In office 18 June 2017 – 21 June 2022
- Preceded by: Jean-Louis Christ
- Succeeded by: Hubert Ott

Personal details
- Born: 4 June 1958 (age 67) Colmar, Haut-Rhin, France
- Party: LR
- Profession: Wine Merchant

Jacques Cattin (born 4 June 1958 in Colmar) was a member of the National Assembly of France. He represented Haut-Rhin's 2nd constituency, and is a member of The Republicans.
