= Liliana Tanguy =

French politician (born 1967)

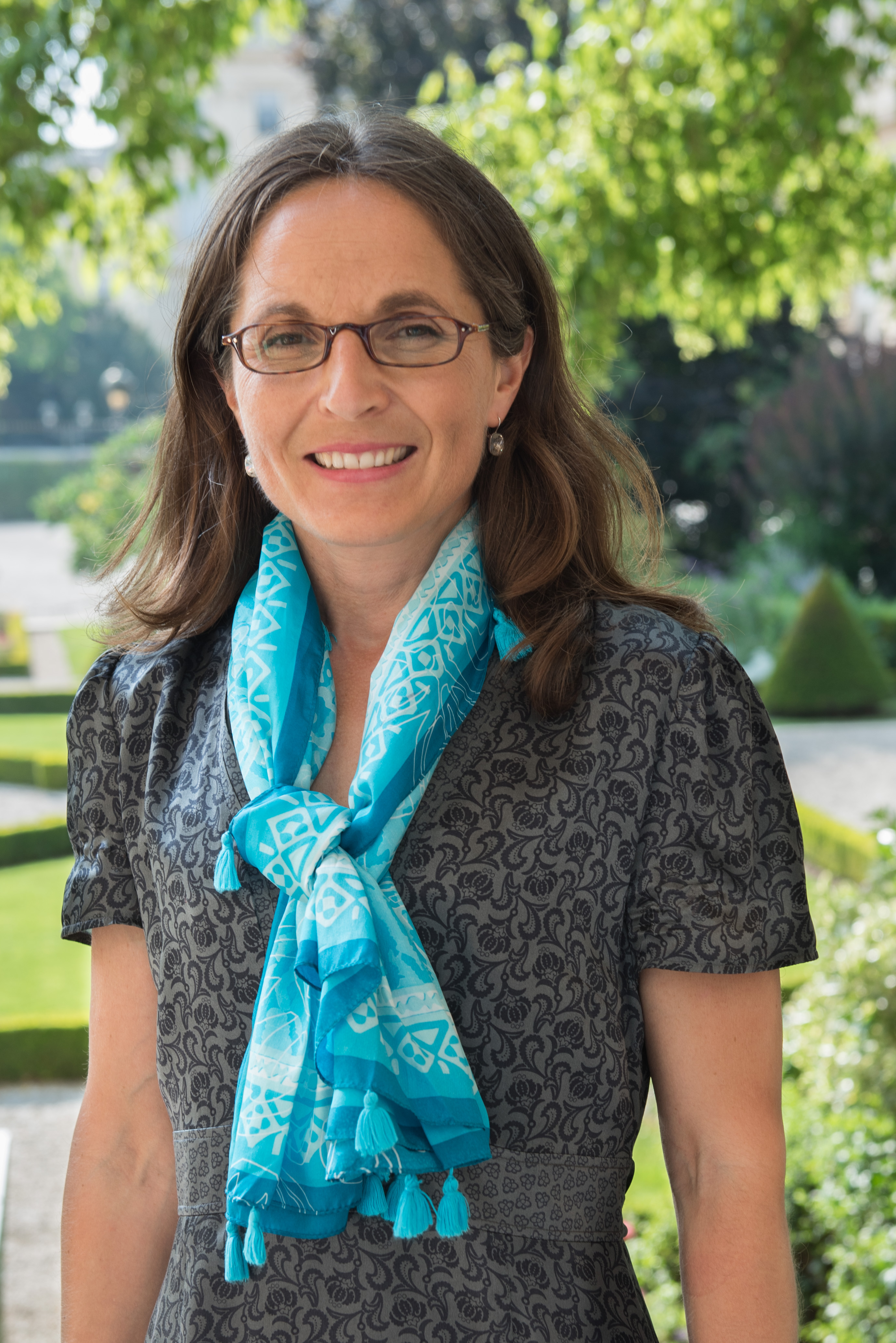

Member of the National Assembly for Finistère's 7th constituency
- Incumbent
- Assumed office 21 June 2017
- Preceded by: Annick Le Loch

Personal details
- Born: 12 March 1967 (age 59) Pančevo, SR Serbia, SFR Yugoslavia
- Party: Renaissance
- Education: Sciences Po; Université Paris-Dauphine; Université Paris 1 Panthéon-Sorbonne

Liliana Tanguy (French pronunciation: [liljana tɑ̃ɡi]; born 12 March 1967) is a Yugoslavian-born French politician of Renaissance (RE) who has represented the 7th constituency of the Finistère department in the National Assembly since 2017.

== Early life and career ==
Tanguy was born in Pančevo, Yugoslavia on 12 March 1967 from a Macedonian father and a Croatian mother who emigrated to France.

== Political career ==
In parliament, Tanguy serves as member of the Committee on Foreign Affairs and the Committee on European Affairs.

In addition to her committee assignments, Tanguy is a member of the French parliamentary friendship groups with Croatia, Bosnia and Herzegovina, North Macedonia and Serbia. Since 2019, she has also been a member of the French delegation to the Franco-German Parliamentary Assembly. She has also been a member of the French delegation to the Parliamentary Assembly of the Council of Europe (PACE) since 2019, where she has served on the Sub-Committee on Disability, Multiple and Intersectional Discrimination (since 2020) and the Committee on the Honouring of Obligations and Commitments by Member States of the Council of Europe (Monitoring Committee) (since 2022).

In 2020, Tanguy joined En Commun (EC) within LREM, led by Barbara Pompili. In the 16th legislature, she did not register with EC again.

== Political positions ==
In July 2019, Tanguy voted in favour of the French ratification of the European Union's Comprehensive Economic and Trade Agreement (CETA) with Canada.

== Recognition ==
In 2018 the World Macedonian Congress (WMC) awarded Tanguy with the highest worldwide Macedonian recognition, the honorary title Macedonian senator.
