= 2021 French departmental elections =

The departments after the elections.

Departmental elections to elect the membership of the Departmental Councils of France's 100 departments were held on 20 and 27 June 2021.

It was delayed by three months due to the COVID-19 pandemic in France.

== Results of councils ==
Party		Outgoing	Elected	+/-
The Republicans	LR	38	45	▲7
Union of Democrats and Independents	UDI	10	8	▼2
The Centrists	LC	1	1	Steady
Soyons libres	SL	0	1	▲1
Miscellaneous right	DVD	14	10	▼4
Total Right		63	65	▲2
Socialist Party	PS	24	21	▼3
Radical Party of the Left	PRG	1	2	▲1
French Communist Party	PCF	1	0	▼1
Miscellaneous left	DVG	2	3	▲1
Total Left		28	26	▼2
La République En Marche!	LREM	1	2	▲1
Democratic Movement	MoDem	1	1	Steady
United Guadeloupe, Solidary and Responsible	GUSR	0	1	▲1
Radical Movement	MR	1	0	▼1
Miscellaneous centre	DVC	1	0	▼1
Total Centre		4	4	Steady
Total		95	95	Steady
