= Justine Gruet =

French politician (born 1989)

Member of the National Assembly for Jura's 3rd constituency
- Incumbent
- Assumed office 22 June 2022
- Preceded by: Jean-Marie Sermier

Personal details
- Born: 23 October 1989 (age 36) Besançon, France
- Party: Union for a Popular Movement (until 2015); The Republicans (2015–present)

Justine Gruet (French pronunciation: [ʒystin ɡʁyɛ]; born 23 October 1989) is a French politician who has represented the 3rd constituency of the Jura department in the National Assembly since 2022. A member of The Republicans (LR), she previously served as a Deputy Mayor of Dole from 2014 to 2022, when she stepped down but remained a municipal councillor.

== See also ==
- List of deputies of the 16th National Assembly of France
