= Jérôme Nury =

French politician

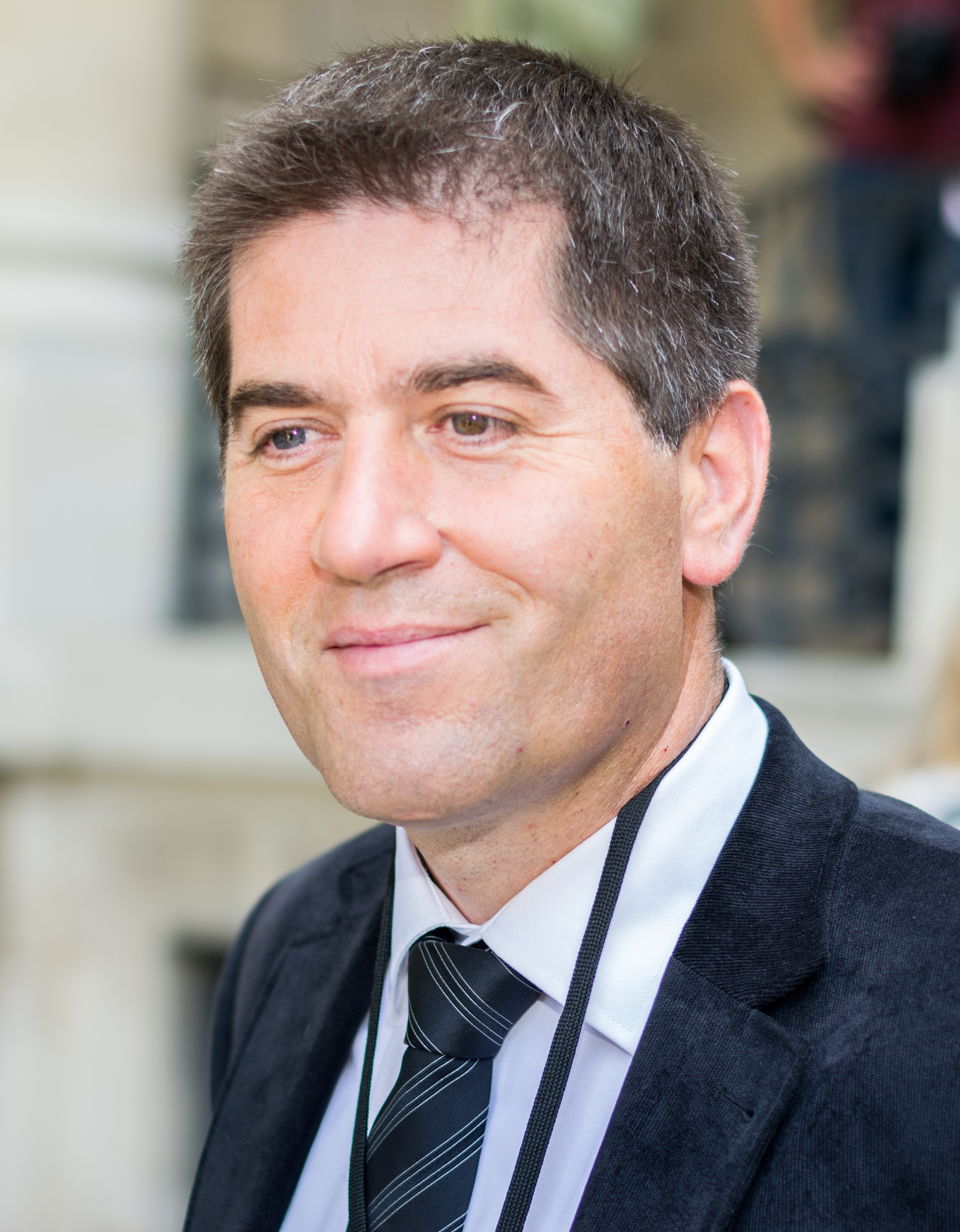

Member of the National Assembly for Orne's 3rd constituency
- Incumbent
- Assumed office 21 June 2017
- Preceded by: Yves Goasdoué

Personal details
- Born: 25 August 1972 (age 54) Valence, France
- Party: The Republicans
- Education: Lumière University Lyon 2

Jérôme Nury (born 25 August 1972) is a member of the National Assembly of France representing the third constituency of Orne.

In March 2026 he won the election to be mayor of Tinchebray-Bocage.
