= Yves Goasdoué =

French politician

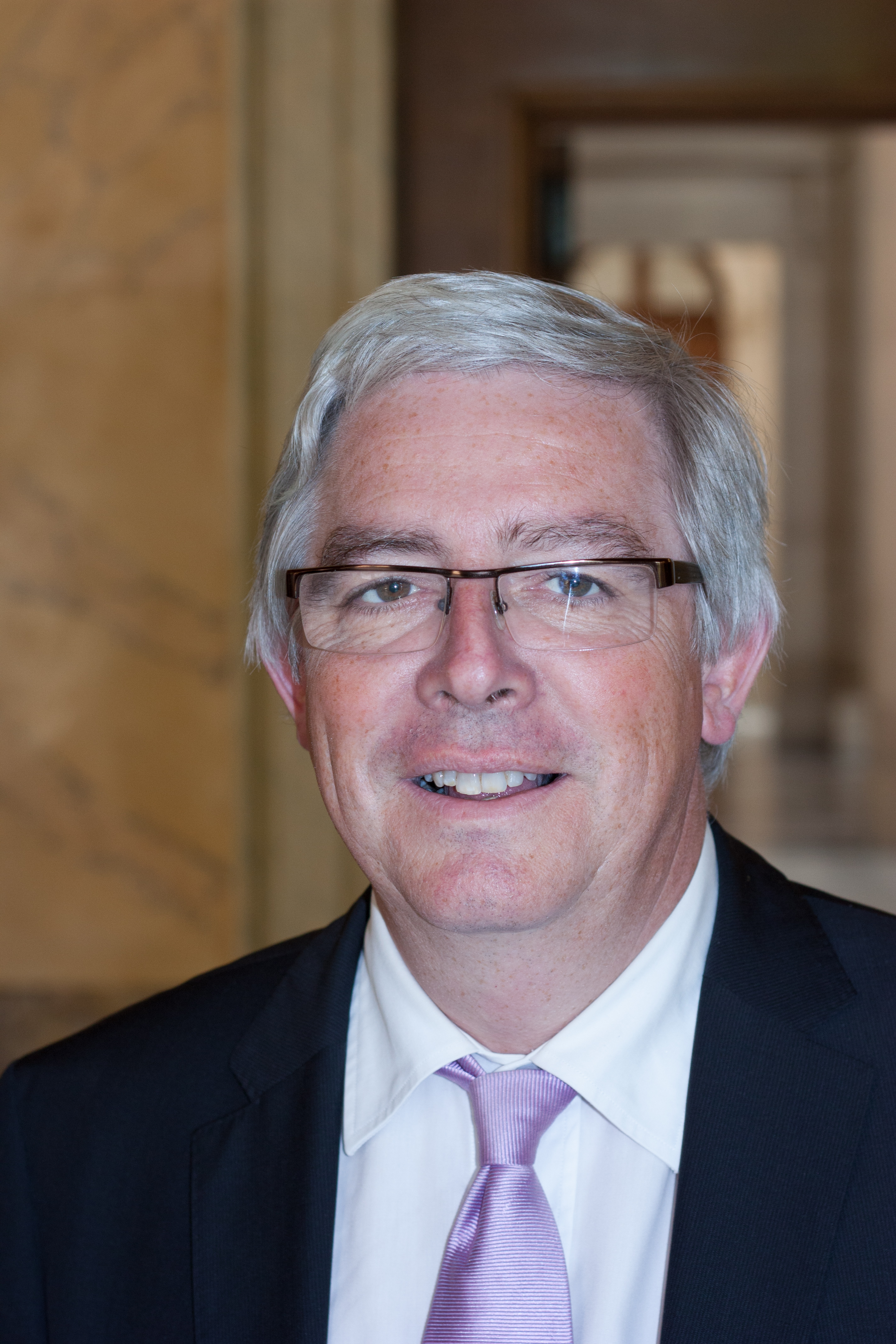
- Yves Goasdoué in 2012

Mayor of Flers
- Incumbent
- Assumed office 18 March 2001
- Preceded by: Michel Lambert

Member of the National Assembly for Orne's 3rd constituency
- In office 21 June 2012 – 21 June 2017
- Preceded by: Sylvia Bassot
- Succeeded by: Jérôme Nury

Personal details
- Born: 22 August 1959 (age 66) Cherbourg, France
- Party: Socialist Party; DVG (since 2012)

Yves Goasdoué (born 22 August 1959) is a French politician. He is the mayor of Flers, Normandy since 2001. He also sat in the National Assembly between 2012 and 2017. He is of Breton origin.

In 1998, he was elected regional councillor for the Orne, and successively mayor of Flers in 2001.
