= Jean-Louis Christ =

French politician

Deputy for Haut-Rhin's 2nd constituency
- In office 2002–2017
- Preceded by: Marc Dumoulin
- Succeeded by: Jacques Cattin

Personal details
- Born: 24 January 1951 (age 75) Ribeauvillé
- Party: UMP

Jean-Louis Christ (born 24 January 1951 in Ribeauvillé) was a member of the National Assembly of France. He represented Haut-Rhin's 2nd constituency from 2002 to 2017. as a member of the Union for a Popular Movement.

== Bibliography ==
- "Célibat et mondialisation" (Celibacy and Globalization), in Jules Barbey d'Aurevilly ou le triomphe de l'écriture : pour une nouvelle lecture de Un prêtre marié by Jean-Pierre Thiollet, H & D, Paris, 2006, pp. 175–181.
