= Jacques Pélissard =

French politician

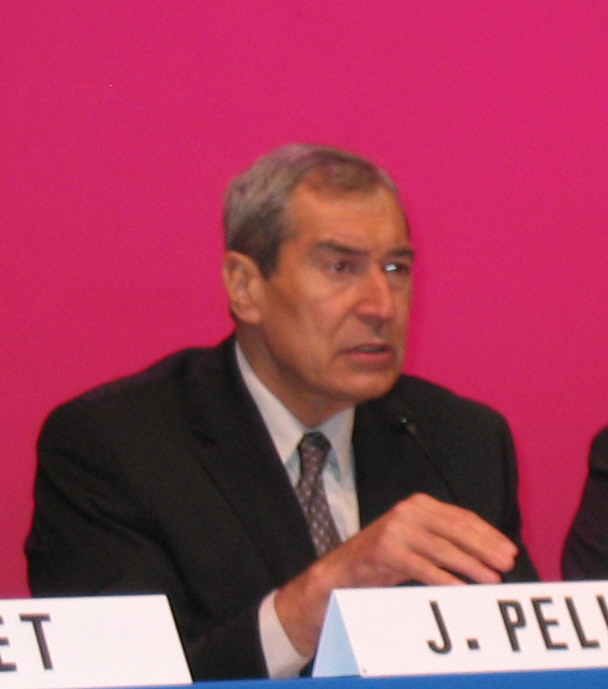
Jacques Pélissard

Jacques Pélissard (French pronunciation: [ʒak pelisaʁ]; born 20 March 1946 in Lyon, Rhône) was a member of the National Assembly of France. He represented Jura's 1st constituency, from 1993 to 2017 as a member of the Union for a Popular Movement. He worked as a professor of economic law at Emlyon Business School between 1971 and 1974.

Jacques Pélissard was part of the "Coppens commission" who prepared the French Charter for the Environment of 2004.
