= Annick Le Loch =

French politician

- Parliamentary group: Socialist

Deputy for Finistère's 7th constituency in the National Assembly of France
- In office 2007–200=17
- Preceded by: Hélène Tanguy
- Succeeded by: Liliana Tanguy

Personal details
- Born: 4 November 1954 (age 71) Pont-l'Abbé, Finistère

Annick Le Loch (born 4 November 1954) was a member of the National Assembly of France. She represented Finistère's 7th constituency from 2007 to 2017, as a member of the Socialiste, radical, citoyen et divers gauche.
