= Danielle Brulebois =

French politician

Brulebois in 2026

Danielle Brulebois (born 4 July 1947) is a French politician representing La République En Marche! She was elected to the French National Assembly on 18 June 2017, representing the department of Jura.

== See also ==
- 2017 French legislative election
