= Charles de la Verpillière =

French politician

Charles de La Verpillière
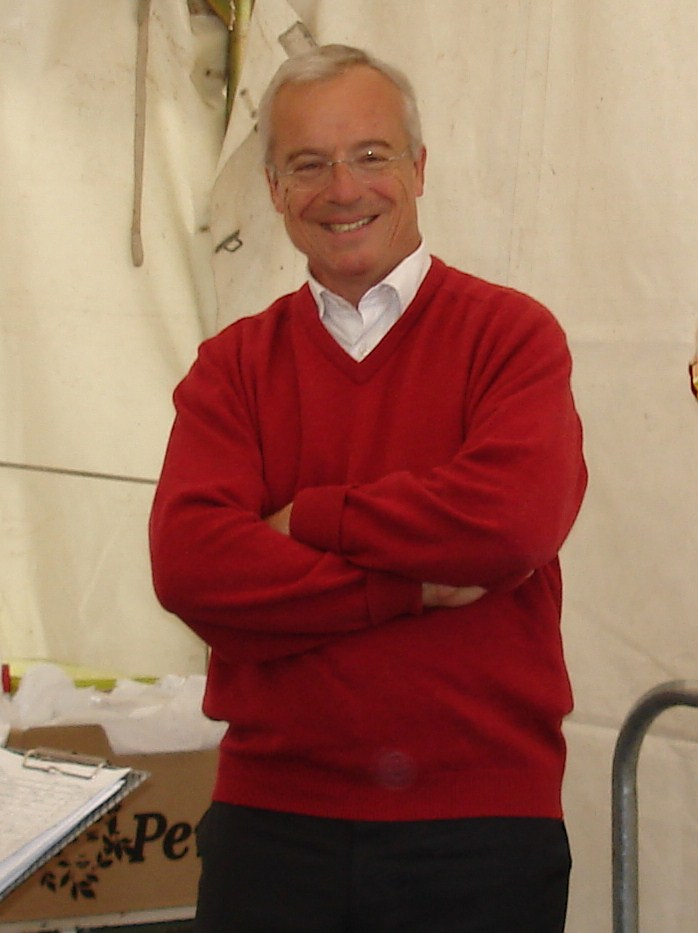

Member of the National Assembly for Ain's 2nd constituency
- In office 20 June 2007 – 19 June 2022
- Preceded by: Lucien Guichon
- Succeeded by: Romain Daubié

Mayor of Lagnieu
- In office 18 June 1995 – 28 March 2004
- Preceded by: Guy de La Verpillière
- Succeeded by: André Moingeon

Personal details
- Born: 31 May 1954 (age 72) Bourg-en-Bresse, France
- Party: The Republicans
- Education: École nationale d'administration

Charles de La Verpillière (born 31 May 1954) is a French politician of The Republicans who formerly served as a member of the National Assembly of France, representing the second constituency of the Ain department.

== Political career ==
In the Republicans’ 2016 presidential primaries, de La Verpillière endorsed Bruno Le Maire as the party's candidate for the office of President of France.

== Recognition ==
La Verpillière is a Knight of the Legion of Honour as well as a Knight of the National Order of Merit.
