= Sovereigntist Right (French politics) =

French political label

Sovereigntist Right (French: Droite souverainiste, DSV) is a political nuance created by the French Ministry of the Interior on the occasion of the regional and departmental elections of 2021.

This nuance is attributed to any candidate, pair or list related to right-wing sovereigntism or supported by a right-wing sovereigntist party. Similarly, this nuance can be attributed to candidates claiming no label but whose background and positions allow them to be classified as such. Finally, an individual candidate can also claim this nuance themselves.

== Establishment ==
The nuance, part of the Répertoire national des élus was created by a circulaire from the Minister of the Interior, Gérald Darmanin, on 23 April, 2021.

== Use ==
During the regional and departmental elections of 2021, the nuance was in particular attributed to the candidates, pairs and lists presented by Debout la France.

On the occasion of the legislative elections of 2022, the nuance was also applied to the parties Les Patriotes and Génération Frexit, the two parties having established an electoral alliance with Debout la France.
