= Romain Daubié =

French politician

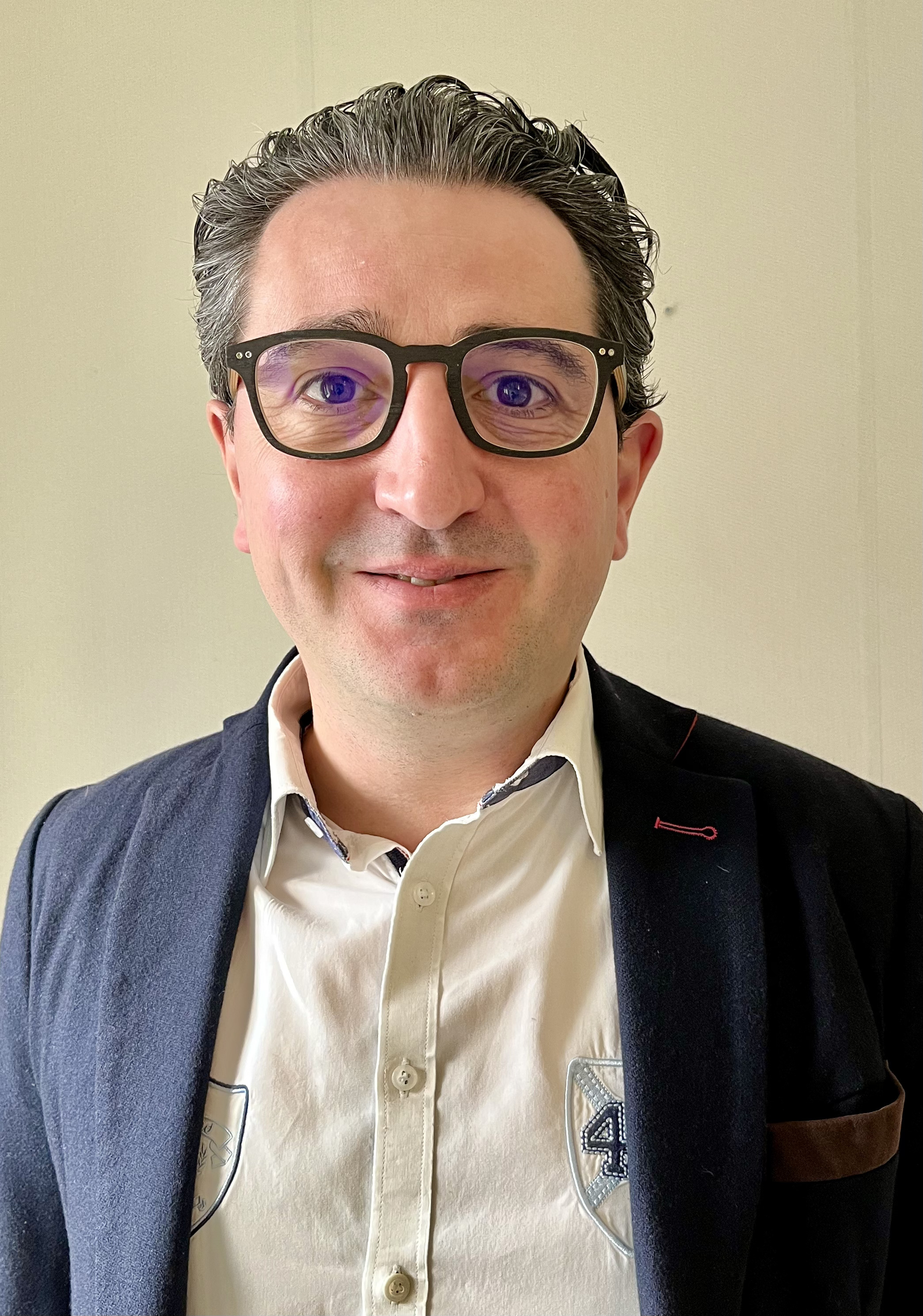
- Romain Daubié in 2023

Member of the National Assembly for Ain's 2nd constituency
- Incumbent
- Assumed office 22 June 2022
- Preceded by: Charles de la Verpillière

Personal details
- Born: 5 May 1980 (age 46) Villeurbanne, France
- Party: MoDem
- Education: Jean Moulin University Lyon 3 HEC Paris

Romain Daubié (born 5 May 1980) is a French lawyer and politician. He has served as Deputy for Ain's 2nd constituency in the National Assembly of France from the 2022 French legislative election onwards.

== Education ==
Romain Daubié has a law degree (Jean Moulin University Lyon 3). In 2005, he obtained a master's degree in international law and management from HEC Paris.
