= National directory of elected officials =

French list of all elected officials in the country

The National directory of elected officials (French: Répertoire national des élus) is a publicly available list of all elected officials of France, from municipal to national, maintained by the French ministry of the interior, as authorised by decree No. 2001-777 of August 30, 2001.

The purpose of the directory includes providing information and the enforcement of legislation;

- prohibiting multiple candidatures by the same person;
- on the accumulation of mandates and functions across levels of government (French: cumul des mandats);
- on political finance;
- on equal access for women and men to electoral mandates and elective functions;
- on the presentation of candidacies for the presidential election;
- on eligibility of political parties and groups to participate in a referendum campaign;
- on the honoraria of local elected officials.

== Nuances ==
Candidates and political parties in this list (with the exception of municipal councillor candidates other than mayors for municipalities with populations under 3,500) are categorised into different ideological groups, referred to as nuances, and these labels are listed on official documents relating to elections. Candidates may request correction of the classification assigned to them. This allocation of all candidates to a nuance effectively eliminates the category of Independent.

This compulsory categorisation, unique in Europe, is regularly contested, when candidates disagree with their assigned affiliation. Nuances sparked controversy during the 2022 French legislative elections, as the Ministry created a common affiliation for the governing coalition Ensemble but not for the left-wing opposition, the New Ecological and Social People's Union (NUPES). This situation led NUPES to appeal to the judge of the summary proceedings division of the Council of State to be assigned a distinct political affiliation. The judge ultimately ruled in NUPES favor and consequently ordered the Minister of the Interior to assign it a affiliation before 10 June 2022. Acknowledging the Council of State's decision, the Ministry announced the same day that it would make the requested change.
