= Miscellaneous right =

Right-wing candidates who are not members of any large party (French term)

Miscellaneous right (Divers droite, DVD) is a French official political category (nuance) which refers to centre-right or right-wing candidates who are not members of any large party. This can include members of small right-wing parties, dissidents expelled from their party for running against their party's candidate, or candidates who were never formal members of a party. Numerous divers droite candidates are elected at both local and national levels.

== See also ==
- Independent conservative, a term used in the United Kingdom and Canada as a label for independent candidates with conservative views
- Independent Liberal (Australia), a member of the Liberal Party of Australia who either contests an election or sits in a legislature as an independent
- Independent Republican (United States), a term used in the United States for independent candidates who loosely identify with the ideals of the national Republican Party but who choose not to formally affiliate with the party
- Miscellaneous centre
- Miscellaneous left
