= Miscellaneous left =

Independent politicians with left-wing views

Miscellaneous left (French: Divers gauche, DVG) is a defined political nuance in France which refers to left-wing candidates who are not members of any political party or a member of party that has no elected seats. They include either small left-wing parties or dissidents expelled from their parties for running against their party's candidate. Numerous divers gauche candidates are elected at a local level, and a smaller number at the national level.

== See also ==
- Independent Democrat, a label used in the United States for an independent candidate who loosely identifies with the ideals of the Democratic Party but is not a formal member of the party
- Miscellaneous centre
- Miscellaneous right
