= List of senators of Ain =

Location of Ain in France

The following is a list of senators of Ain, people who have represented the department of Ain in the Senate of France.

== Third Republic ==
Senators from the Ain during the French Third Republic were:

| In office | | Name |
|---|---|---|
| 1876 | 1885 | Louis Bonnet |
| 1876 | 1885 | Charles-Philippe Robin |
| 1985 | 1907 | Étienne Goujon |
| 1985 | 1899 | Jean Mercier |
| 1985 | 1900 | Hippolyte Morellet |
| 1901 | 1908 | Joseph Pochon |
| 1900 | 1912 | Honoré Giguet |
| 1908 | 1923 | Alexandre Bérard |
| 1909 | 1917 | Pierre Baudin |
| 1920 | 1945 | Eugène Chanal |
| 1912 | 1923 | Donat Bollet |
| 1923 | 1935 | Adolphe Messimy |
| 1923 | 1945 | Albert Fouilloux |
| 1935 | 1945 | Michel Tony-Révillon |

== Fourth Republic ==
Senators from the Ain during the French Fourth Republic were:

| In office | | Name |
|---|---|---|
| 1946 | 1948 | Gustave Mermet-Guyenet |
| 1946 | 1951 | Jean Saint-Cyr |
| 1948 | 1959 | André Litaise |
| 1951 | 1955 | Paul Chastel |
| 1951 | 1959 | Auguste Billiemaz |

== Fifth Republic ==
Senators from the Ain during the French Fifth Republic have been:

=== Senators of the Ain (1959-1962 mandate) ===
List of senators of the Ain between 1959 and 1962
| Senator | Party | Capacity |
|---|---|---|
| Auguste Billiemaz | RAD | General councillor for the Canton of Belley |
| Joseph Brayard | DVG | |

=== Senators of the Ain (1962-1971 mandate) ===
List of senators of the Ain between 1962 and 1971
| Senator | Party | Capacity |
|---|---|---|
| Auguste Billiemaz | RAD, MRG | General councillor for the Canton of Belley |
| Joseph Brayard | DVG | |

=== Senators of the Ain (1971-1980 mandate) ===
| Senator | Party | Capacity |
|---|---|---|
| Auguste Billiemaz | MRG | General councillor for the Canton of Belley |
| Roland Ruet | FNRI, UDF-PR | President of the General Council of the Ain (1976-1984) Mayor of Ferney-Voltaire (1959-1971) |

=== Senators of the Ain (1980-1989 mandate) ===
| Senator | Party | Capacity |
|---|---|---|
| Guy de La Verpillière | UDF-PR | |
| Roland Ruet | UDF-PR | President of the General Council of the Ain (1976-1984) Mayor of Ferney-Voltaire (1959-1971) |

=== Senators of the Ain (1989-1998 mandate) ===
| Senator | Party | Capacity |
|---|---|---|
| Jean-Paul Émin | UDF-PR | |
| Jean Pépin | UDF-PR | President of the General Council of the Ain (1992-2004) Mayor of Saint-Nizier-le-Bouchoux (1977-2001) |

=== Senators of the Ain (1998-2008 mandate) ===
| Senator | Party | Capacity |
|---|---|---|
| Jean-Paul Émin | DL, UMP | |
| Jean Pépin | DL, UMP | President of the General Council of the Ain (1992-2004) Mayor of Saint-Nizier-le-Bouchoux (1977-2001) |

=== Senators of the Ain (2008-2014 mandate) ===
| Senator | Party | Capacity |
|---|---|---|
| Jacques Berthou | PS | Mayor of Miribel |
| Sylvie Goy-Chavent | UMP | Mayor of Cerdon |
| Rachel Mazuir | PS | President of the General Council of the Ain (2008-2015) General councilor for the Canton of Bourg-en-Bresse-Est (1988-2015) |

=== Senators of the Ain (2014-2020 mandate) ===
| Senator | Party | Capacity |
|---|---|---|
| Sylvie Goy-Chavent | UDI-RAD, LR | Mayor of Cerdon |
| Patrick Chaize | UMP, LR | Mayor of Vonnas |
| Rachel Mazuir | PS | President of the General Council of the Ain (2008-2015) General councilor for the Canton of Bourg-en-Bresse-Est (1988-2015) |

=== Senators of the Ain (2020-2026 mandate) ===
| Senator | Party | Capacity |
|---|---|---|
| Sylvie Goy-Chavent | LR | Regional councillor for Auvergne-Rhône-Alpes (2016-present) |
| Patrick Chaize | LR | Municipal councillor for Vonnas |
| Florence Blatrix-Contat | PS | Mayor of Drom (2020-present) Regional councillor for Auvergne-Rhône-Alpes (2016-present) |

== Sources ==
- Liste des anciens sénateurs de la IIIème République par circonscription (in French), Sénat de France
- Liste des anciens sénateurs de la IVème République par circonscription (in French), Sénat de France
- Liste des anciens sénateurs de la Vème République par circonscription (in French), Sénat de France
- Liste par département – Ain (in French), Sénat de France
