= Rachel Mazuir =

French politician

Member of the Senate
- In office 1 October 2008 – 30 September 2020
- Succeeded by: Florence Blatrix-Contat
- Parliamentary group: SOC
- Constituency: Ain

President of the General Council of the Ain
- In office 20 March 2008 – 1 April 2015
- Preceded by: Charles de La Verpillière
- Succeeded by: Damien Abad

General Councillor for the Ain
- In office 2 October 1988 – 1 April 2015
- Succeeded by: Françoise Convert
- Constituency: Canton of Bourg-en-Bresse-Est

Personal details
- Born: Bourg-en-Bresse, Ain
- Party: Socialist Party

Rachel Mazuir is a French politician. A member of the Socialist Party, he served in the Senate of France from 2008 until 2020, representing the Ain department.

== Biography ==
Professor of physical education and sports, Rachel Mazuir was elected to the municipal council of Bourg-en-Bresse in 1977, where he served as the deputy mayor from 1977 to 1989 and again from 1995 to 2001.

General councilor of the canton of Bourg-en-Bresse-Est from 1988, he took advantage of the strong progression of the left during the cantonal elections of 2008 and won the presidency of the General Council of Ain, defeating the outgoing Charles de La Verpillière on March 20, 2008.

He was elected senator in the September 2008 elections.

In the 2015 departmental elections, associated with Marie-Claire Panabières, he lost in the second round against the right-wing pair formed by Martine Tabouret and Jean-Yves Flochon, elected with 45.57% of the votes.
