= Damien Abad =

French politician (born 1980)

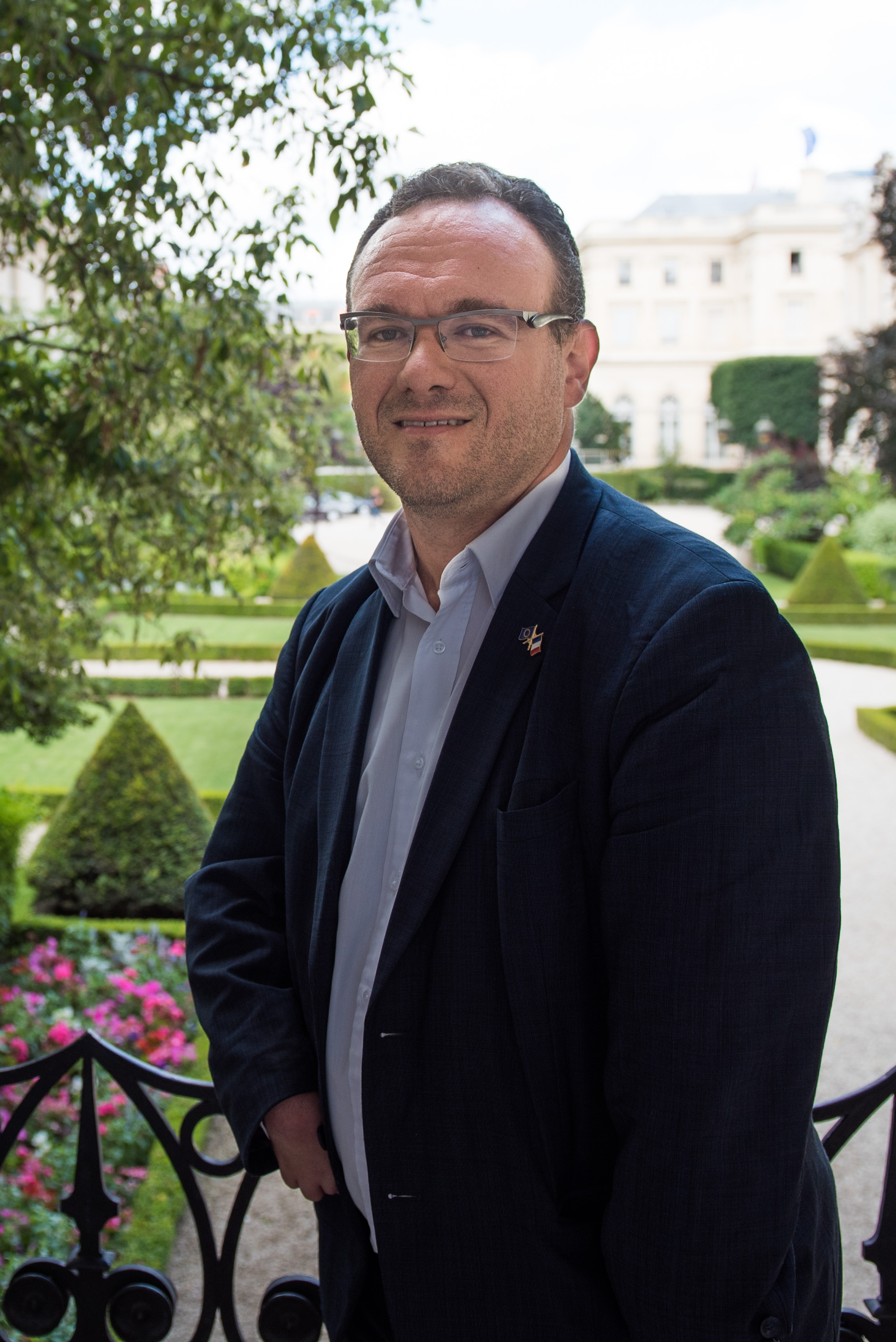
- Abad in 2017

Member of the National Assembly for Ain's 5th constituency
- In office 20 June 2012 – 9 June 2024
- Preceded by: Constituency established
- Succeeded by: Marc Chavent

Minister of Solidarity
- In office 20 May 2022 – 4 July 2022
- President: Emmanuel Macron
- Prime Minister: Élisabeth Borne
- Preceded by: Olivier Véran (solidarity); Brigitte Bourguignon (personal independence); Sophie Cluzel (disabled)
- Succeeded by: Jean-Christophe Combe

Leader of The Republicans in the National Assembly
- In office 6 November 2019 – 19 May 2022
- Preceded by: Christian Jacob
- Succeeded by: Éric Ciotti

Member of the Departmental Council of Ain for Canton of Pont-d'Ain
- Incumbent
- Assumed office 2 April 2015

President of the Departmental Council of Ain
- In office 2 April 2015 – 10 July 2017
- Preceded by: Rachel Mazuir
- Succeeded by: Jean Deguerry

Member of the European Parliament for South-East France
- In office 14 July 2009 – 17 June 2012

Personal details
- Born: 5 April 1980 (age 46) Nîmes, France
- Party: Independent (2022–present)
- Other political affiliations: UDF (until 2007); NC (2007–2012); UMP (2012–2015); LR (2015–2022)
- Education: IEP de Bordeaux; Sciences Po

Damien Abad (French pronunciation: [damjɛ̃ abad]; born 5 April 1980) is a French politician who briefly served as Minister of Solidarity in the government of Prime Minister Élisabeth Borne in 2022.

Abad previously served as Member of the National Assembly for Ain's 5th constituency from 2012 to 2024, where he was the president of The Republicans group from 2019 to 2022.

As part of the Union for French Democracy, New Centre and then the Union for a Popular Movement, which was later renamed The Republicans, Abad also served as municipal councilor of Vauvert from 2008 to 2010, Member of the European Parliament for South-East France from 2009 to 2012, regional councilor of Rhône-Alpes from 2010 to 2015 and president of the departmental council of Ain from 2015 to 2017.

== Education and family ==
Abad's parents live in Aubord in the department of Gard. His father works as a purchasing manager in a large company and comes from a family that had fled Francoist Spain, while his mother is a social worker and gymnastics teacher.

In secondary school, Abad attended the Vallée Verte college and the Lycée Alphonse-Daudet before beginning his university education at Sciences Po Bordeaux. He graduated from Sciences Po in Paris in 2004 and then became a lecturer for the school.

Abad has arthrogryposis, a rare disease and physical disability. Many media outlets consider him the first member of the National Assembly to be disabled.

== Political career ==
=== Beginnings in the UDF and New Centre, 2006–2009 ===
In 2006, Abad was put in charge of budgetary and fiscal studies in the Union for French Democracy (UDF) group and then the New Centre group in the National Assembly. He was a candidate for Yvelines' 5th constituency in the 2007 French legislative elections, where he won 3.17% of the vote. In 2008, Abad founded the Young Centrists movement, which was affiliated with the New Centre, and was virtually unanimously elected its first president in May. He left this position to become joint General Secretary of New Centre in 2010.

In 2008, Abad was elected to the municipal council of Vauvert on the list of mayor Gérard Gayaud. He then resigned after winning a seat on the regional council of Rhône-Alpes, where he sat on the Employment, Economy, Social and Solidarity Economy, and Social Innovation Committee as well as the Sports and Youth Committee.

=== Member of the European Parliament, 2009–2012 ===
In the 2009 European elections, Abad was elected Member of the European Parliament on the Union for a Popular Movement (UMP) list in the South-East France constituency, with the UMP having formed an alliance with New Centre for the elections. At the age of 29, Abad became the youngest French MEP, the youngest French parliamentarian in office and one of the youngest elected members of the European Parliament. During his time in parliament, he frequently spoke about economic issues, especially in terms of industrial policy, social services and consumer protection. He also founded the youth intergroup and served on the Committee on Budgets (2009–2012) and on the Committee on International Trade (2012). In addition to his committee assignments, he was part of the parliament's Delegation for relations with the Palestinian Legislative Council. Abad's MEP office was located in Bourg-en-Bresse.

On 2 April 2015, Abad was elected as the President of the departmental council of Ain. Due to the limitation of the plurality of the mandates, he resigned from his position on 10 July 2017.

=== Member of the National Assembly, 2012–2024 ===
In the 2012 French legislative elections, Abad ran to represent Ain's 5th constituency as a member of the Union for a Popular Movement. He was elected with 28.79% of the vote in the first round and 56% in the second round against Socialist candidate Josiane Exposito. During that year's election of the President of the National Assembly, Abad was chosen as secretary of the session as one of the six youngest members.

Abad was reelected to the National Assembly in the 2017 French legislative elections. He subsequently stood as a candidate for the presidency of The Republicans group in the Assembly against Christian Jacob, who won with 62 votes against Abad's 32. Abad was then appointed as the group's first vice-president, serving from 2017 to 2019.

Abad serves on the National Defence and Armed Forces Committee, the European Affairs Committee and the Working Group on the Legislative Procedure, Parliamentary Organization and the Rights of the Opposition. He is also vice-president of the France-China Friendship Group.

In addition to his work in parliament, Abad has served as member of the French delegation to the Parliamentary Assembly of the Council of Europe from 2014 until 2017 and since 2017. In this capacity, he is a member of the Committee on Social Affairs, Health and Sustainable Development.

In The Republicans' 2016 presidential primaries, Abad endorsed Bruno Le Maire as the party's candidate for President of France. In the party's 2017 leadership election, he endorsed Laurent Wauquiez.

Following Christian Jacob's election as president of The Republicans, Abad again ran for the leadership of the party's parliamentary group in November 2019. He won by 64 votes over Olivier Marleix, who received 37 votes. The news website Contexte commented that the result represented an end to the "old divisions between "Sarkozystes," "Fillonistes" and "Juppéistes,"" with Abad being able to present "a profile that reassures members of the National Assembly of the old generation without cutting off those who were newly elected in 2017, who form half of the party's parliamentary group." It also noted Abad's "positioning as an independent man" who "owes nothing to Christian Jacob," while Marleix had suffered from a report in Le Canard enchaîné portraying him as the previous leader's handpicked candidate.

At The Republicans' national convention in December 2021, Abad was part of the 11-member committee which oversaw the party's selection of its candidate for the 2022 presidential elections. He himself endorsed Xavier Bertrand for Republican nominee.

He was reelected in the 2022 election. In the 2024 election, he came third in the first round, and lost his seat.

== Political positions ==
In July 2019, Abad voted against the French ratification of the European Union's Comprehensive Economic and Trade Agreement (CETA) with Canada.

In a joint letter initiated by Norbert Röttgen and Anthony Gonzalez ahead of the 47th G7 summit in 2021, Abad joined some 70 legislators from Europe and the US in calling upon their leaders to take a tough stance on China and to "avoid becoming dependent" on the country for technology including artificial intelligence and 5G.

== Controversy ==
According to an investigation published by Mediapart on May 21, 2022, Abad has been implicated by two women, unrelated to each other, for acts of rape which they believe occurred in 2010 and 2011. A report was sent on May 16 to those responsible for the two parties Les Républicains and Renaissance by the Observatory of sexist and sexual violence in politics. Prime Minister Élisabeth Borne assured that she discovered the existence of the report in Mediapart. On May 20, Christophe Castaner denied having received the report. The Paris prosecutor's office confirmed the existence of two complaints filed by the same complainant and dismissed in 2012 and 2017.

In a letter also published by Mediapart, Abad rejected the accusations and "strongly affirms that the sexual relations that [he has] been able to have always been based on the principle of mutual consent". He affirmed that his handicap makes impossible a certain number of the acts which are reproached to him, the presumed victims affirming for their part that he uses his handicap to make them feel guilty.

In June 2022, the Paris prosecution office opened an investigation into Abad, on suspicion of attempted rape.
