= Louis Bonnet =

French doctor and politician (1815-1892)

Louis Eugène Bonnet
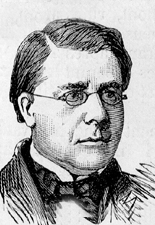

Senator of Ain
- In office 30 January 1876 – 24 January 1885

Personal details
- Born: 6 October 1815 Jujurieux, Ain
- Died: 26 November 1892 (aged 77) Jujurieux, Ain
- Occupation: Doctor, politician

Louis Eugène Bonnet (6 October 1815 – 26 November 1892) was a French doctor and politician who was Senator of Ain from 1876 to 1885.

== Life ==
Louis Eugène Bonnet was born in Jujurieux, Ain, on 6 October 1815. He obtained a doctorate in medicine at Paris, then for some time worked as an internal surgeon in the hospitals of Lyon. He then returned to Ain to practice medicine. He became a general councilor for the canton of Poncin, Ain.

== Senator ==
On 30 January 1876, Bonnet was elected senator of Ain. He joined the moderate left. In June 1877, he voted against the dissolution of the Chamber of Deputies. He fought the government of May 16 with the Republican minority. In 1879, he supported the ministry of Jules Armand Dufaure. On 9 March 1890, he voted for article 7 of Jules Ferry's project for free higher education. On 9, July he voted for amnesty for the members of the Paris Commune. In February 1883, he voted for the bill on expulsion of the princes. In 1884, he voted for reestablishment of divorce.

== Last years ==
Bonnet did not run for reelection on 25 January 1885. After retiring from public life he returned to his birthplace. He died in Jujurieux, Ain, on 26 November 1892, at the age of 77.

== Publications ==
- Dr. Louis Eugène Bonnet (1881), Introduction à l'étude les tumeurs, Paris: G. Masson

== Sources ==
- Jolly, Jean (1960–1977), "BONNET (LOUIS, EUGÈNE)", Dictionnaire des Parlementaires français (in French)
- Robert, Adolphe; Cougny, Gaston (1889–1891), "BONNET (LOUIS-EUGÈNE)", in Edgar Bourloton (ed.), Dictionnaire des parlementaires français (in French)
