= Marc Chavent =

French politician (born 1968)

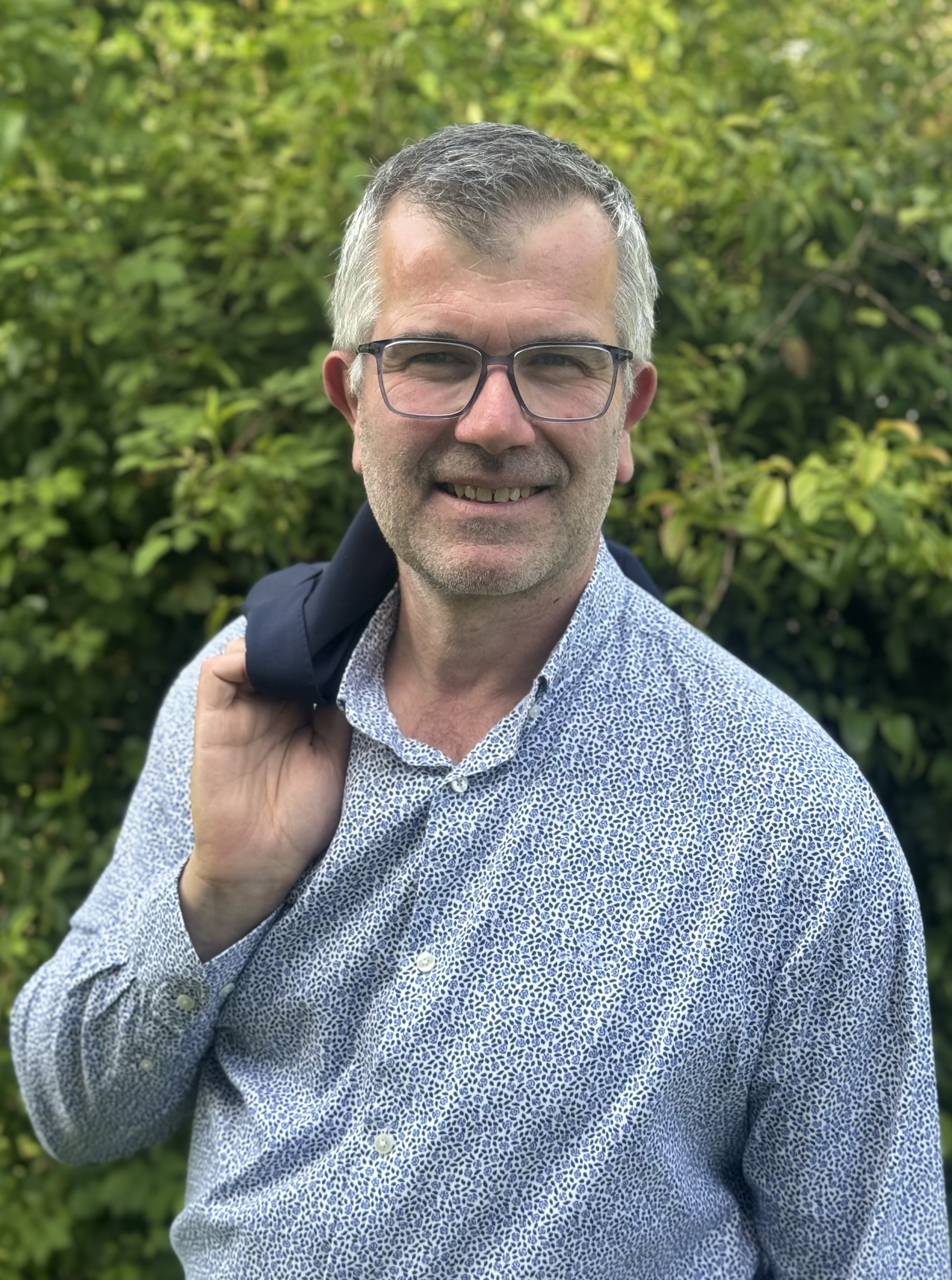

Member of the National Assembly for Ain's 5th constituency
- Incumbent
- Assumed office 8 July 2024
- Preceded by: Damien Abad

Mayor of Cerdon
- In office 25 May 2020 – 7 July 2024
- Preceded by: Georges Vucher
- Succeeded by: Éric Casamassa

Personal details
- Born: 28 June 1968 (age 58) Bourg-en-Bresse, France
- Party: Reconquête (2021–2024); The Republicans (2024); Union of the Right for the Republic (2024–present)
- Other political affiliations: Union for a Popular Movement (2010s)
- Relatives: Sylvie Goy-Chavent (sister)
- Occupation: Civil servant

Marc Chavent (French pronunciation: [maʁk ʃavɑ̃]; born 28 June 1968) is a French politician who has represented the 5th constituency of Ain in the National Assembly since 2024. He is a member of the Union of the Right for the Republic (UDR).

== Early life and career ==
Chavent is the younger brother of senator Sylvie Goy-Chavent. He worked as parliamentary assistant to his sister from 2008 until his election to the National Assembly. In the 2020 municipal election, he was elected mayor of Cerdon. He joined Reconquête in 2021, and during the 2022 presidential election he was one of the first elected officials to support the campaign of Reconquête candidate Éric Zemmour.
