= Arrondissements of the Ain department =

Administrative divisions of Ain, France

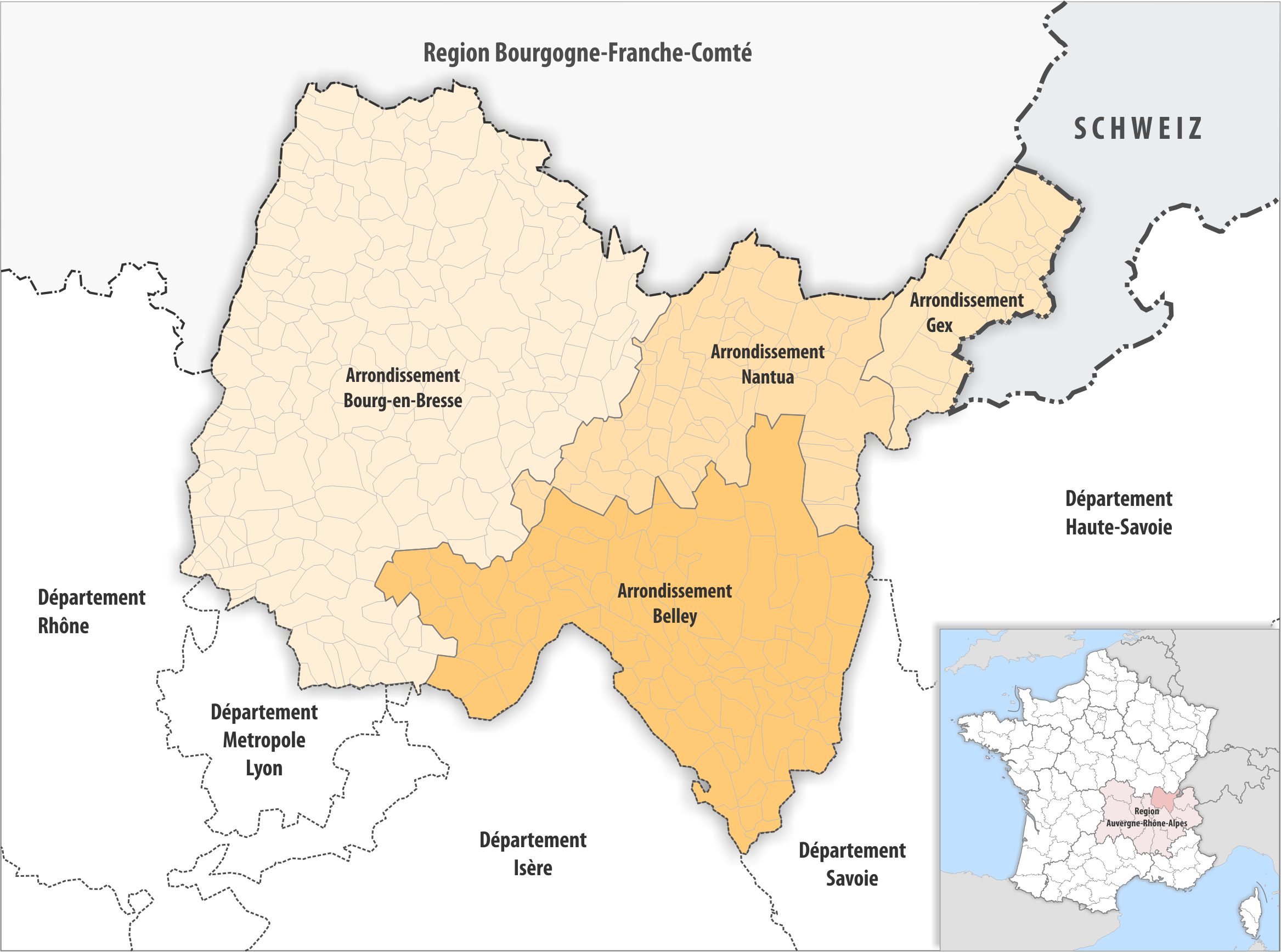
Map of arrondissements of the Ain department.

The 4 arrondissements of the Ain department are:

1. Arrondissement of Belley, (subprefecture: Belley) with 104 communes. The population of the arrondissement was 124,868 in 2021.
2. Arrondissement of Bourg-en-Bresse, (prefecture of the Ain department: Bourg-en-Bresse) with 199 communes. The population of the arrondissement was 342,454 in 2021.
3. Arrondissement of Gex, (subprefecture: Gex) with 27 communes. The population of the arrondissement was 102,027 in 2021.
4. Arrondissement of Nantua, (subprefecture: Nantua) with 62 communes. The population of the arrondissement was 93,853 in 2021.

== History ==
In 1800 the arrondissements of Belley, Bourg-en-Bresse, Nantua and Trévoux were created. In 1815 the arrondissement of Gex was created. The arrondissements of Gex and Trévoux were disbanded in 1926. The arrondissement of Gex was restored in 1933.

The borders of the arrondissements of Ain were modified in January 2017:

- one commune from the arrondissement of Belley to the arrondissement of Nantua
- 12 communes from the arrondissement of Bourg-en-Bresse to the arrondissement of Belley
- four communes from the arrondissement of Bourg-en-Bresse to the arrondissement of Nantua
- two communes from the arrondissement of Gex to the arrondissement of Nantua
- one commune from the arrondissement of Nantua to the arrondissement of Belley
