= Récif fossile de Marchon - Christian Gourrat Regional Nature Reserve =

Regional nature reserve and fossil site in Auvergne-Rhône-Alpes, France

- IUCN category IV (habitat/species management area)
- Interactive map of Récif fossile de Marchon - Christian Gourrat Regional Nature Reserve
- Location: Ain, France
- Nearest city: Arbent
- Coordinates: 46°16′18″N 5°40′42″E
- Area: 0.1 hectares (0.25 acres)
- Established: 6 March 2015
- Governing body: Conservatoire d'espaces naturels de Rhône-Alpes

Récif fossile de Marchon
- Stratigraphic range: Berriasian
- Type: Fossil site

Lithology
- Primary: Limestone outcrop

Location
- Coordinates: 46°16′18″N 5°40′42″E
- Region: Auvergne-Rhône-Alpes
- Country: France

Type section
- Named for: Forêt de Marchon
- Récif fossile de Marchon - Christian Gourrat Regional Nature Reserve (France)

The Récif fossile de Marchon - Christian Gourrat Regional Nature Reserve (RNR284) is a Regional Nature Reserve located in Auvergne-Rhône-Alpes. Established in 2015, it spreads over 0.1 hectares (0.25 acres) and protects a limestone outcrop bearing fossils from the Mesozoic era.

== Localisation ==
The territory of the natural reserve is located in the Ain department, on the town of Arbent near the city of Oyonnax. Its reduced surface makes it the second smallest natural reserve of France.

== History of the site and reserve ==
The site was discovered in 1996 by Christian Gourrat, a naturalist from Oyonnax. Initially established as a Voluntary Nature Reserve under the name of Forêt de Marchon Natural Reserve, it is now registered at the regional inventory of geologic sites.

== Ecology (biodiversity, ecological interest, etc.) ==
The site is reduced to a limestone outcrop in the Marchon forest. It bears fossil animals from the Mesozoic era (140 My), particularly rudists. For several species, the reef represents the locus typicus.

The local forest is mainly composed of beech and spruce.

== Touristic and educational interest ==
The reserve is open to the public. Any samplings are forbidden.

== Administration, management plan, regulations ==
=== Tools and legal status ===
The natural reserve was established after a deliberation of the Regional Council of 06 March 2015.
