= Jujurieux =

Commune in Auvergne-Rhône-Alpes, France

- Commune
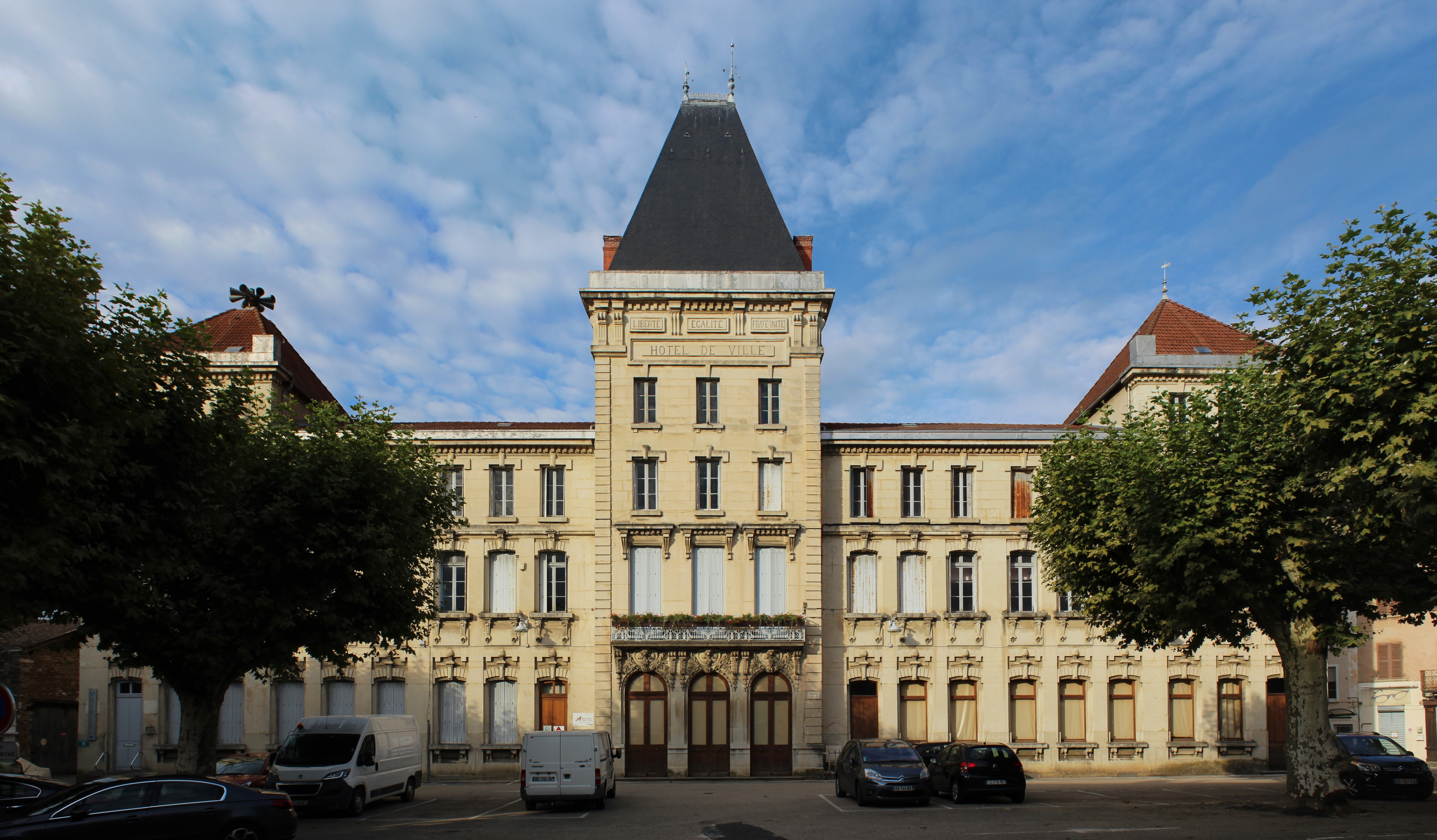
- Town hall
- Location of Jujurieux
- Location within France Location within Auvergne-Rhône-Alpes
- Coordinates: 46°02′27″N 5°24′34″E
- Country: France
- Region: Auvergne-Rhône-Alpes
- Department: Ain
- Arrondissement: Nantua
- Canton: Pont-d'Ain
- Intercommunality: Rives de l'Ain - Pays du Cerdon

Government
  - Mayor (2026–32): Frédéric Monghal
- Area^{1}: 15.39 km^{2} (5.94 sq mi)
- Elevation: 260 m (850 ft)
- Highest elevation: 633 m (2,077 ft)
- Lowest elevation: 242 m (794 ft)
- Population (2023): 2,260
  - Density: 147/km^{2} (380/sq mi)
- Time zone: UTC+01:00 (CET)
  - Summer (DST): UTC+02:00 (CEST)
- INSEE/Postal code: 01199 /01640
- ^{1} French Land Register data, which excludes lakes, ponds, glaciers > 1 km^{2} (0.386 sq mi or 247 acres) and river estuaries.

Jujurieux (French pronunciation: [ʒyʒyʁjø]) is a commune in the Ain department in eastern France.

== Population ==
Historical population
Year	Pop.	±% p.a.
1968	1,520	—
1975	1,459	−0.58%
1982	1,492	+0.32%
1990	1,602	+0.89%
1999	1,700	+0.66%
2007	1,986	+1.96%
2012	2,148	+1.58%
2017	2,156	+0.07%
2023	2,260	+0.79%
Source: INSEE

== See also ==
- Communes of the Ain department
