= Lac Genin =

Lake in the Ain department, France

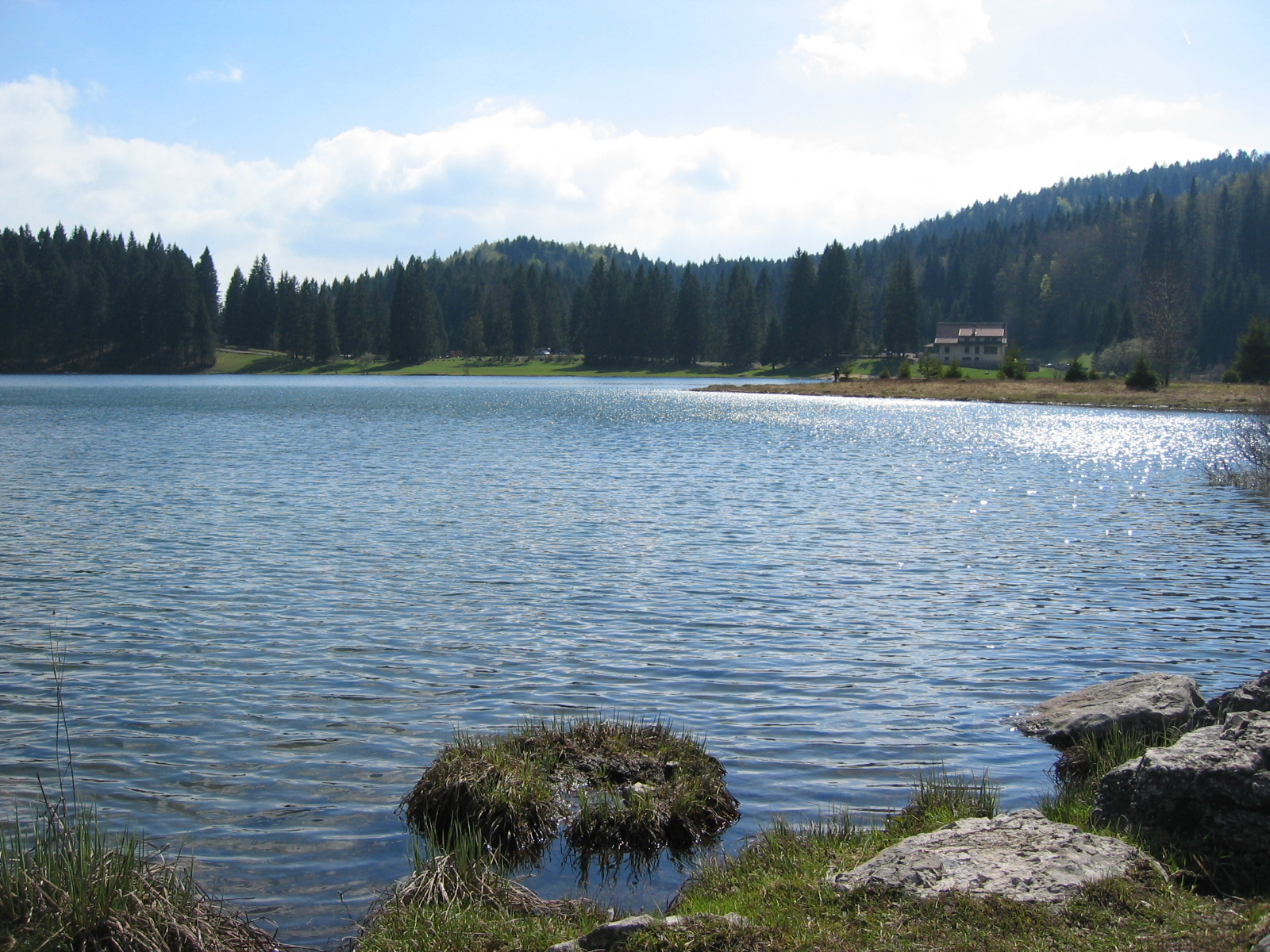

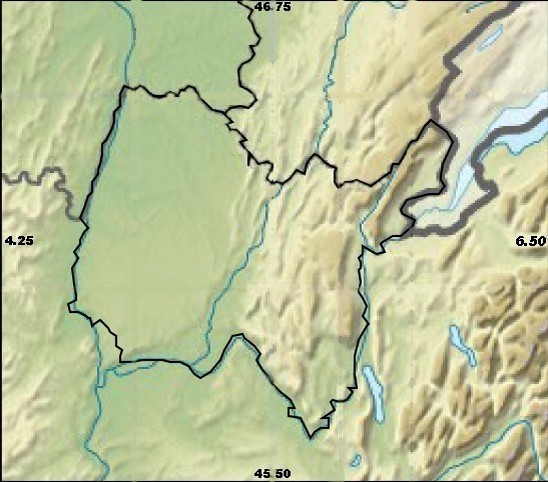
- Location within Ain
- Location: Ain
- Coordinates: 46°13′14″N 5°41′53″E
- Primary inflows: underground
- Basin countries: France
- Max. length: 380 m (1,250 ft)
- Surface area: 8.15 ha (20.1 acres)
- Max. depth: 18 m (59 ft)
- Surface elevation: 850 m (2,790 ft)
- Frozen: winter

Lac Genin is a lake in the Ain department, France. Its surface area is 8.15 ha at an elevation of 850 m. The lake is fed by underground sources.

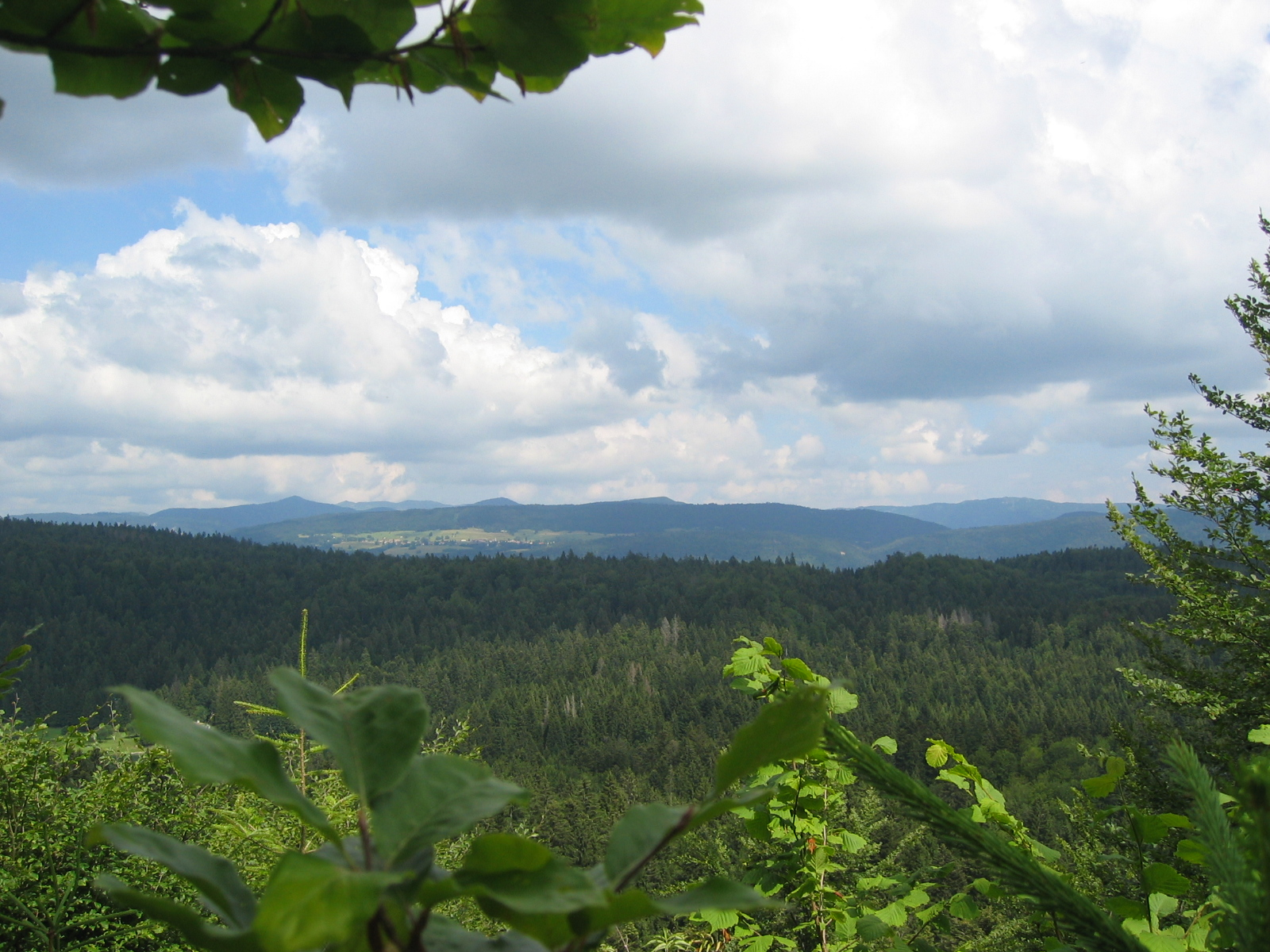
View of the village of Giron from above the lake
