= Jean-Paul Émin =

French politician (1939–2024)

Member of the French Senate for Ain
- In office 24 September 1989 – 30 September 2008

Personal details
- Born: 17 June 1939
- Died: 5 June 2024 (aged 84)
- Party: UREI (1989–1995); RI (1995–2002); UMP (2002–2008)

Jean-Paul Émin (17 June 1939 – 5 June 2024) was a French politician of the Republican Party (UREI), the Independent Republicans Group (RI), and the Union for a Popular Movement Group (UMP). He served in the Senate from 1989 to 2008, representing Ain. Émin died on 5 June 2024, at the age of 84.
