= Fifth constituency of the Ain =

Constituency of the National Assembly of France

Ain's 5th constituency
- Constituency for the National Assembly
- Boundary of Ain's 5th constituency in Ain

- Location of Ain within France
- Department: Ain
- Region: Auvergne-Rhône-Alpes
- Population: 114,097

Current constituency
- Deputy: Marc Chavent
- Political party: LR (UXD)

The 5th constituency of the Ain is a French legislative constituency in the Ain département. It was created by ordinance n°2009-935 of 29 July 2009, ratified by the French Parliament on 21 January 2010. It consists of the cantons of Ambérieu-en-Bugey, Brénod, Champagne-in-Valromey, Hauteville-Lompnes, Izernore, Lhuis, Nantua, North Oyonnax, Oyonnax South, Poncin, Saint-Rambert-en-Bugey, Virieu-le-Grand. The constituency was first contested in the 2012 legislative elections.

== Members elected ==
| Election | Member | Party |
|---|---|---|
| 2012 | Damien Abad | UMP |
| 2017 | Damien Abad | LR |
| 2022 | Damien Abad | SE |
| 2024 | Marc Chavent | LR |

== Election results ==
=== 2024 ===
| Candidate | Party | Alliance | First round | | | Second round | | |
| Candidate | Party | Alliance | Votes | % | +/– | Votes | % | +/– |
|---|---|---|---|---|---|---|---|---|
| Marc Chavent | LR-RN | UXD | 20,161 | 39.12 | +19.40 | 27,040 | 57.53 | |
| Florence Pisani | LFI | NFP | 12,542 | 24.34 | +0.80 | 19,964 | 42.47 | |
| Damien Abad | DVD | | 9,651 | 18.73 | -14.65 | | | |
| Nathalie Descours | RE | ENS | 6,036 | 11.71 | N/A | | | |
| Fabrice Bourdin | LR | | 1,623 | 3.15 | -6.78 | | | |
| Sylvie Crozet | LO | | 606 | 1.18 | +0.03 | | | |
| Thomas Chatelard | DVE | | 484 | 0.94 | N/A | | | |
| Maria Cristina Patru | REC | | 429 | 0.83 | -4.92 | | | |
| Valid votes | | | 51,532 | 97.28 | +0.05 | 47,004 | 88.88 | |
| Blank votes | | | 978 | 1.85 | -0.36 | 4,683 | 8.85 | |
| Null votes | | | 463 | 0.87 | +0.31 | 1,200 | 2.27 | |
| Turnout | | | 52,973 | 68.00 | +20.14 | 52,887 | 67.87 | |
| Abstentions | | | 24,927 | 32.00 | -20.14 | 25,032 | 32.13 | |
| Registered voters | | | 77,900 | | | 77,919 | | |
Source: Ministry of the Interior, Le Monde
| Result | | | | | | LR GAIN FROM DVD | | |

=== 2022 ===
| Candidate | Party | Alliance | First round | | Second round | |
| Candidate | Party | Alliance | Votes | % | Votes | % |
|---|---|---|---|---|---|---|
| Damien Abad | DVD | | 12,034 | 33.38 | 17,687 | 57.86 |
| Florence Pisani | LFI | NUPES | 8,485 | 23.54 | 12,882 | 42.14 |
| Joëlle Nambotin | RN | | 7,110 | 19.72 | | |
| Julien Martinez | LR | UDC | 3,580 | 9.93 | | |
| Philippe Tournier-Billon | REC | | 2,073 | 5.75 | | |
| Stéphanie Paris | LMR | | 931 | 2.58 | | |
| Celil Yilmaz | DIV | | 704 | 1.95 | | |
| Grégory Fabris | LP | | 436 | 1.21 | | |
| Sylvie Crozet | LO | | 414 | 1.15 | | |
| Jean-Michel Boulmé | POID | | 281 | 0.78 | | |
| Valid votes | | | 36,048 | 97.23 | 30,569 | 90.54 |
| Blank votes | | | 820 | 2.21 | 2,354 | 6.97 |
| Null votes | | | 206 | 0.56 | 839 | 2.49 |
| Turnout | | | 37,074 | 47.86 | 33,762 | 43.58 |
| Abstentions | | | 40,382 | 52.14 | 43,704 | 56.42 |
| Registered voters | | | 77,456 | | 77,466 | |
| Result | | | DVD GAIN FROM LR | | | |

- Incumbent Damien Abad stood for LR at the last election, but is standing as an independent having joined the Borne government as Minister of Solidarity in May 2022. While not an official part of the Ensemble Citoyens coalition, his candidacy is supported by the coalition and they have not stood a candidate in the constituency.

=== 2017 ===
| Candidate | Label | First round | | Second round | |
| Candidate | Label | Votes | % | Votes | % |
|---|---|---|---|---|---|
| Damien Abad | LR | 12,743 | 35.00 | 19,383 | 67.02 |
| Hélène de Meire | LREM | 9,149 | 25.13 | 9,538 | 32.98 |
| Pénélope Chalon | FN | 5,599 | 15.38 | | |
| Bertrand Jacquier | FI | 3,759 | 10.32 | | |
| Carole Pontier | ECO | 1,051 | 2.89 | | |
| Élodie Schwander | PS | 1,032 | 2.83 | | |
| Mylène Ferri | PCF | 809 | 2.22 | | |
| Ahmet Cetin | DIV | 721 | 1.98 | | |
| Claude Juillet | DLF | 637 | 1.75 | | |
| Monique Meudan | DIV | 398 | 1.09 | | |
| Jean-Philippe Archeny | DIV | 231 | 0.63 | | |
| Guy Largeron | EXG | 158 | 0.43 | | |
| Jean-Michel Boulmé | EXG | 121 | 0.33 | | |
| Votes | | 36,408 | 100.00 | 28,921 | 100.00 |
| Valid votes | | 36,408 | 98.53 | 28,921 | 91.18 |
| Blank votes | | 374 | 1.01 | 2,050 | 6.46 |
| Null votes | | 168 | 0.45 | 749 | 2.36 |
| Turnout | | 36,950 | 49.03 | 31,720 | 42.13 |
| Abstentions | | 38,409 | 50.97 | 43,569 | 57.87 |
| Registered voters | | 75,359 | | 75,289 | |
Source: Ministry of the Interior

=== 2012 ===
Summary of the 10 and 17 June 2012 French legislative in Ain's 5th Constituency election results
| Candidate | Party | | 1st round | | 2nd round | |
| Candidate | Party | | Votes | % | Votes | % |
|---|---|---|---|---|---|---|
| Damien Abad | Union for a Popular Movement | UMP | 13,231 | 31.81% | 22,008 | 56.40% |
| Josiane Exposito | Socialist Party | PS | 11,857 | 28.51% | 17,012 | 43.60% |
| Patrick Sokolowski | National Front | FN | 7,482 | 17.99% | | |
| Michel Perraud | Radical Party | PRV | 3,946 | 9.49% | | |
| Mylène Ferri | Left Front | FG | 3,046 | 7.32% | | |
| Jean Galienne | Ecologist | ECO | 446 | 1.07% | | |
| Brigitte Sansano | Miscellaneous Right | DVD | 305 | 0.73% | | |
| Patrick Royer | Ecologist | ECO | 301 | 0.72% | | |
| Bernard Favre | Ecologist | ECO | 232 | 0.56% | | |
| Jean-Michel Boulme | Far Left | EXG | 222 | 0.53% | | |
| Christophe Ceresero-Lanes | Far Left | EXG | 184 | 0.44% | | |
| Bernard Leger | Miscellaneous Right | DVD | 176 | 0.42% | | |
| Guy Largeron | Far Left | EXG | 165 | 0.40% | | |
| Total | | | 41,593 | 100% | 39,020 | 100% |
| Registered voters | | | 73,718 | | 73,713 | |
| Blank/Void ballots | | | 557 | 1.32% | 1,302 | 3.23% |
| Turnout | | | 42,150 | 57.18% | 40,322 | 54.70% |
| Abstentions | | | 31,568 | 42.82% | 33,391 | 45.30% |
| Result | | | | | UMP WIN | |

== Sources ==
- Official results of French elections from 1998: "Résultats électoraux officiels en France" (in French). Archived from the original on 20 December 2011.
