= Canton of Bourg-en-Bresse-Est =

Coordinates: 46°12′20″N 5°13′44″E

Bourg-en-Bresse-Est
- Former canton
- Interactive map of Bourg-en-Bresse-Est
- Country: France
- Region: Auvergne-Rhône-Alpes
- Department: Ain
- No. of communes: {{{nbcomm}}}
- Disbanded: 2015
- Population (2012): 12,276

The canton of Bourg-en-Bresse-Est is a former administrative division in eastern France. It was disbanded following the French canton reorganisation which came into effect in March 2015. It comprised part of the commune of Bourg-en-Bresse. It had 12,276 inhabitants (2012).

== Demographics ==
Historical population
Year	Pop.	±%
1990	15,355	—
1999	13,433	−12.5%
2012	12,276	−8.6%

== See also ==
- Cantons of the Ain department
- Communes of France
