= Departmental Council of Ain =

Departmental Legislature of Ain, France

Departmental council of Ain Conseil départemental de l'Ain
- Logo of the Council

Leadership
- President: Jean Deguerry, LR since 7 October 2017

Structure
- Political groups: L'Ain de toutes nos forces political group: LR: 22 seats; DVD: 14 seats; UDI: 6 seats; L'Ain pour tous - écologie et solidarité political group: PS: 3 seats DVG: 1 seat

Meeting place
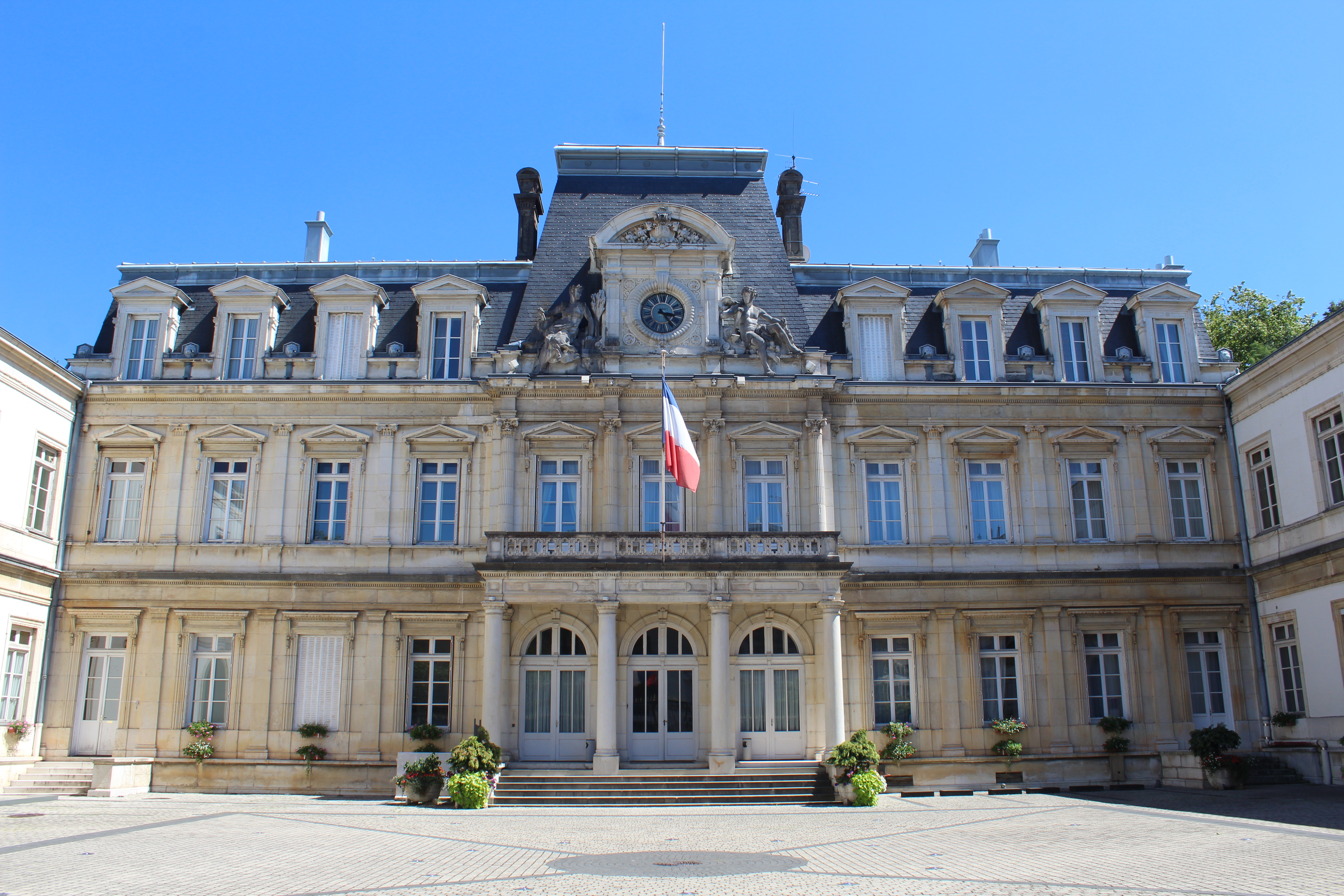
- Hôtel de préfecture de l'Ain, Bourg-en-Bresse

Website
- www.ain.fr

The Departmental Council of Ain (French: Conseil départemental de l'Ain, Arpitan: Consèly Dèpartamentâla de En) is the deliberative assembly of the Ain department in the region of Auvergne-Rhône-Alpes. It consists of 46 members (departmental councilors) from 23 cantons and its headquarters are in Bourg-en-Bresse, capital of the department.

The president of the departmental council is Jean Deguerry.

== Vice-Presidents ==
The president of the departmental council is assisted by 11 vice-presidents chosen from among the departmental advisers. Each of them has a delegation of authority.

List of vice-presidents of the Ain Departmental Council (as of 2021)
| Order | Name | Party | Canton (constituency) | Delegation |
|---|---|---|---|---|
| 1st | Martine Stool | UCD | Châtillon-sur-Chalaronne | Medical demography and autonomy (elderly and disabled) |
| 2nd | Jean-Yves Flochon | UD | Ceyzériat | Agriculture, preservation of biodiversity and resources (water, air, soil, forest) and the environment |
| 3rd | Véronique Baude | UCD | Gex | Youth, colleges, education and higher education |
| 4th | Pierre Lurin | UCD | Bourg-en-Bresse-2 | Finances, buildings and general means |
| 5th | Hélène Bertrand-Maréchal | UCD | Bourg-en-Bresse-1 | Childhood and family |
| 6th | Gerard Paoli | UCD | Gex | Economy, SME pact, cross-border and European affairs |
| 7th | Helene Cedileau | UCD | Bourg-en-Bresse-2 | Human resources and sports |
| 8th | Guy Billoudet | UD | Replonges | Roads and mobility |
| 9th | Clotilde Fournier | UCD | Attignat | Integration, employment, habitat and housing |
| 10th | Romain Daubié | LR | Meximieux | Contractualization and land use planning |
| 11th | Marie-Christine Chapel | UCD | Pont-d'Ain | Tourism, heritage and culture |

== Budget ==
In 2021, the departmental council of Ain had a budget of 618.2 million euros compared to 572 million euros in 2015.

== See also ==
- Ain
- Departmental councils of France
