= Sylvie Goy-Chavent =

French politician (born 1963)

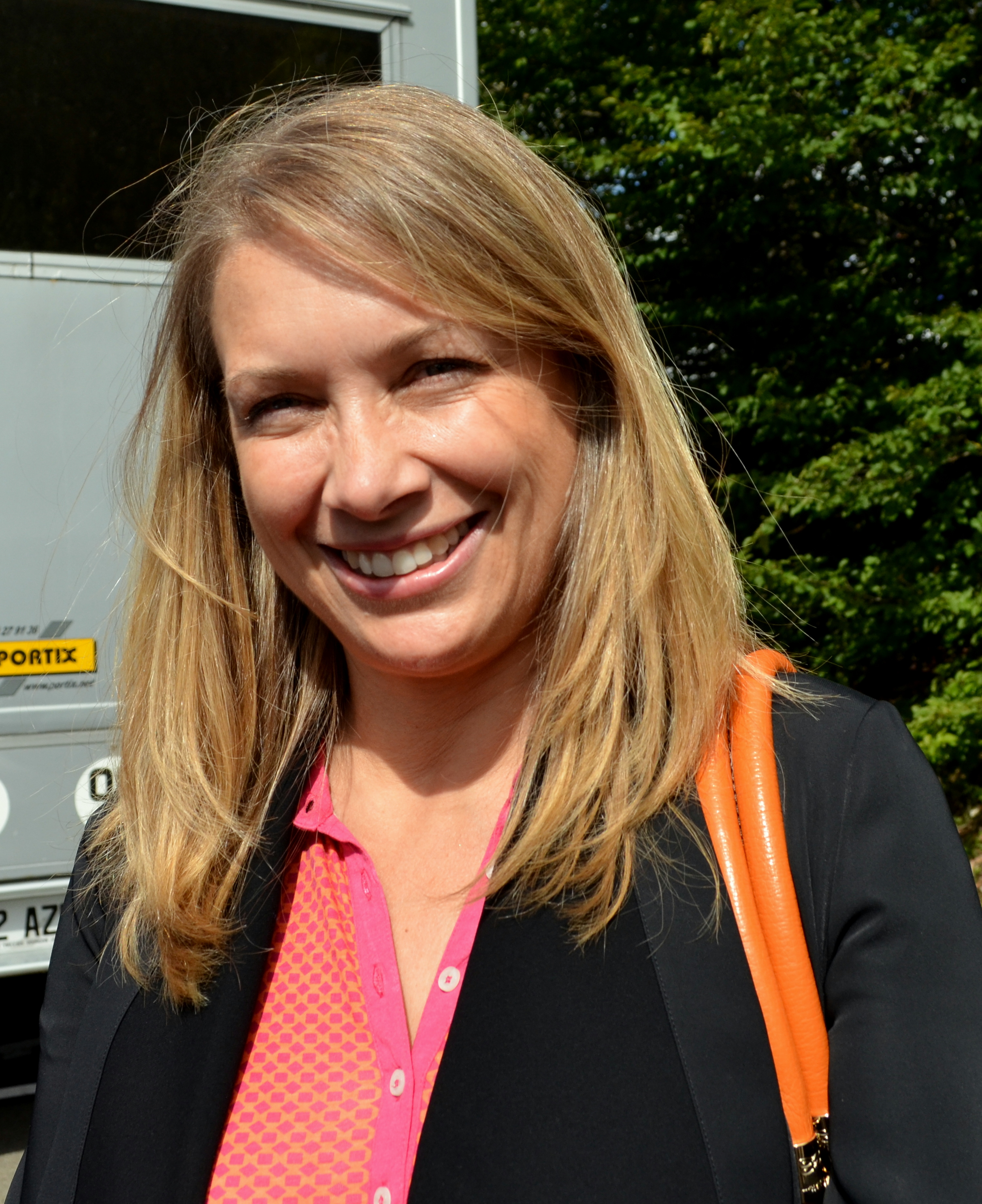
- Goy-Chavent in 2014

Member of the French Senate for Ain
- Incumbent
- Assumed office 1 October 2008

Personal details
- Born: Sylvie Chavent; 23 May 1963 (age 62) Dunkirk, France
- Party: UMP-PRV (2002–2012); UDI-PRV (2012–2017); UDI (2017–2019); LR (since 2019)
- Profession: Teacher

Sylvie Goy-Chavent (née Chavent; born 23 May 1963) is a French politician of the Republicans (LR) who has been serving as a member of the Senate of France since 2008, representing the Ain department. From 1995 to 2017, she was also the mayor of Cerdon.

== Political career ==
In parliament, Goy-Chavent serves on the Committee on Foreign Affairs and Defense.

Ahead of the Republicans' 2016 presidential primary, Goy-Chavent first endorsed Nicolas Sarkozy and later François Fillon as the party's candidate for the 2017 French presidential election.

Ahead of the 2022 presidential elections, Goy-Chavent publicly declared her support for Michel Barnier as the Republicans’ candidate.
