= Florence Blatrix-Contat =

French politician (born 1966)

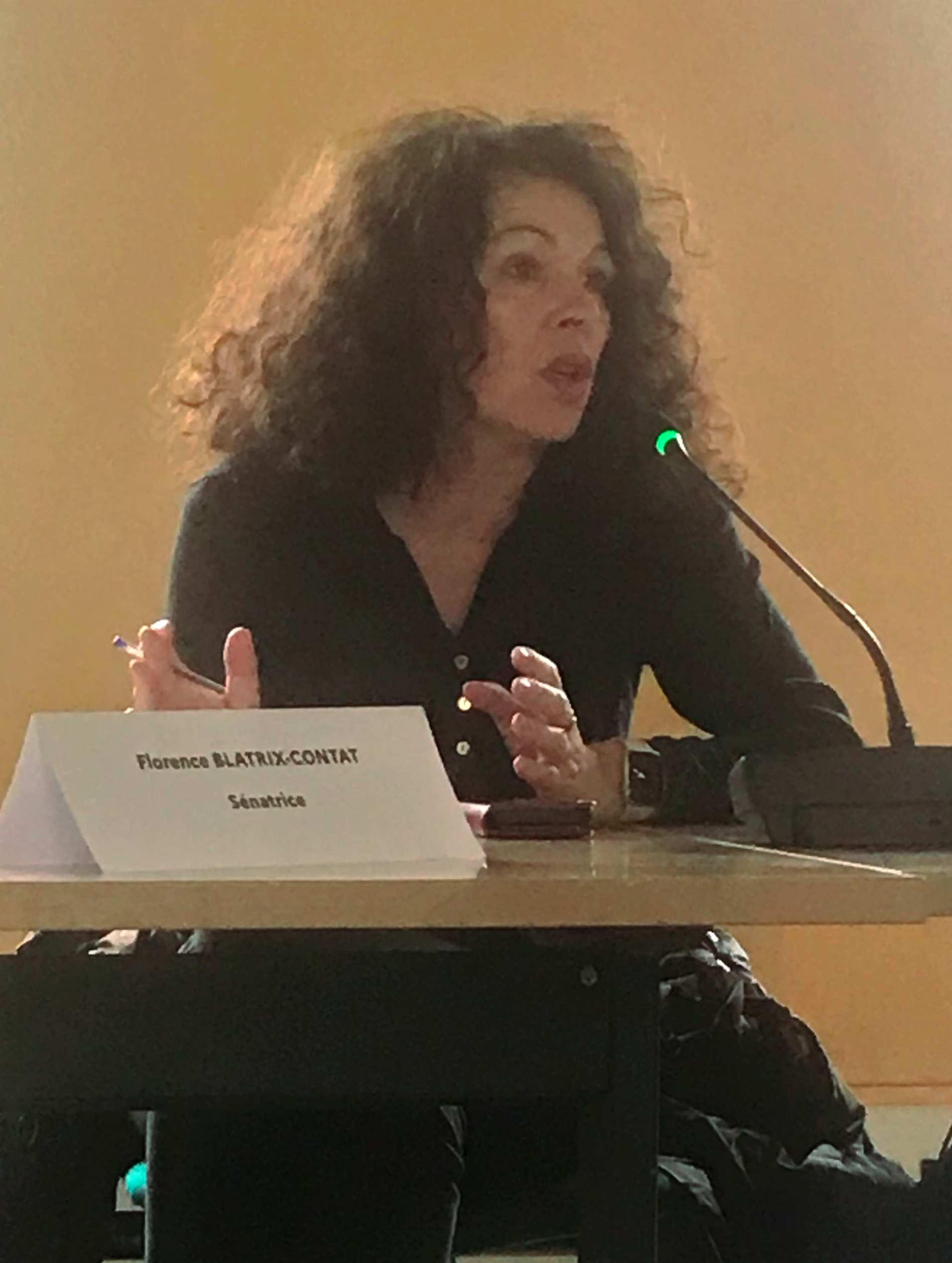
- Senator Florence Blatrix Contant in 2024

Member of the French Senate for Ain
- Incumbent
- Assumed office 1 October 2020

Personal details
- Born: 30 March 1966 (age 60) France
- Party: Socialist Party
- Profession: Teacher

Florence Blatrix-Contat (French: [flɔʁɑ̃s blatʁiks kɔ̃ta]; born 30 March 1966) is a French politician from the Socialist Party. She was elected Senator for Ain on 27 September 2020.
