= Ain =

Department in Auvergne-Rhône-Alpes, France

Ain En (Arpitan)
- Département
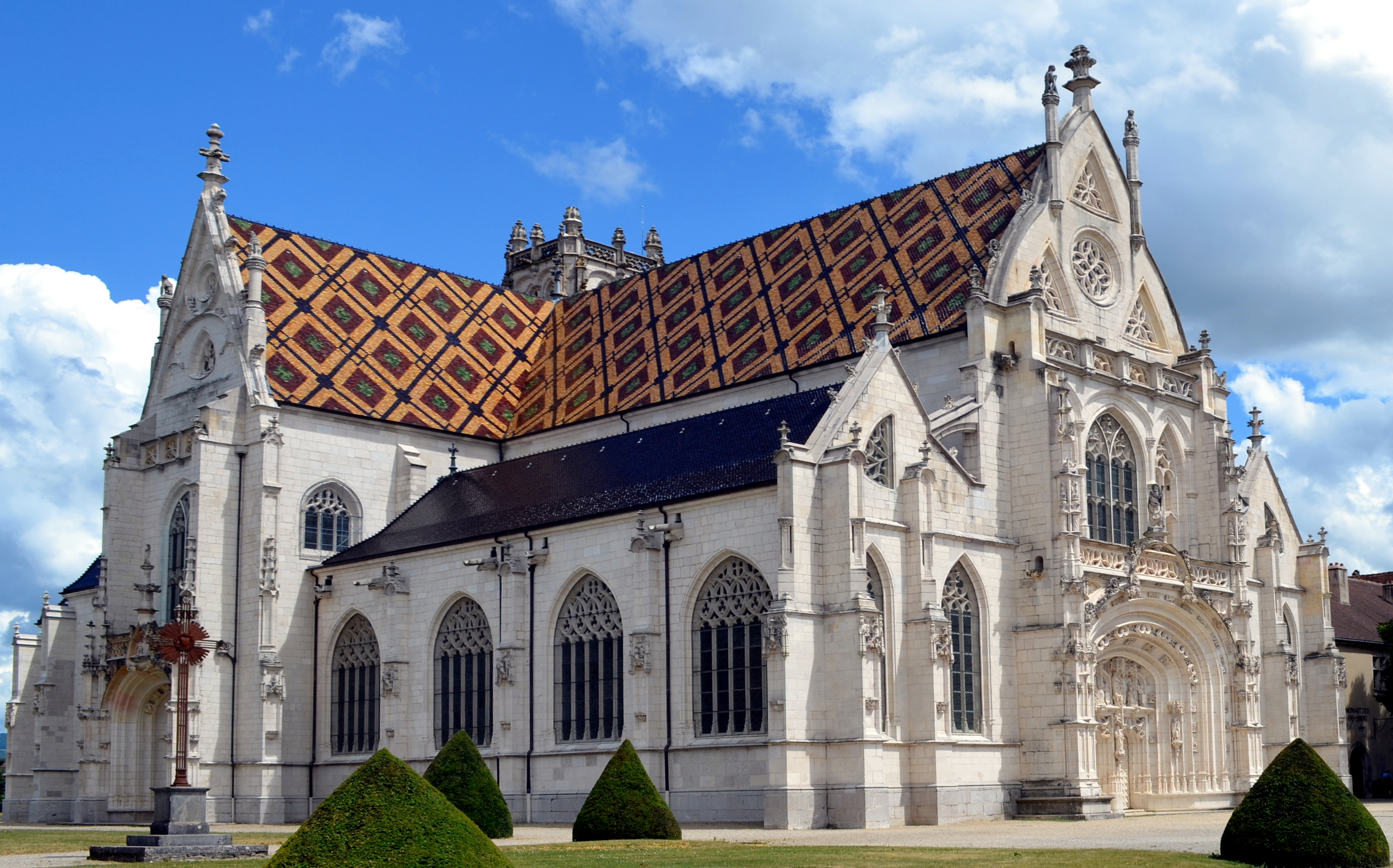
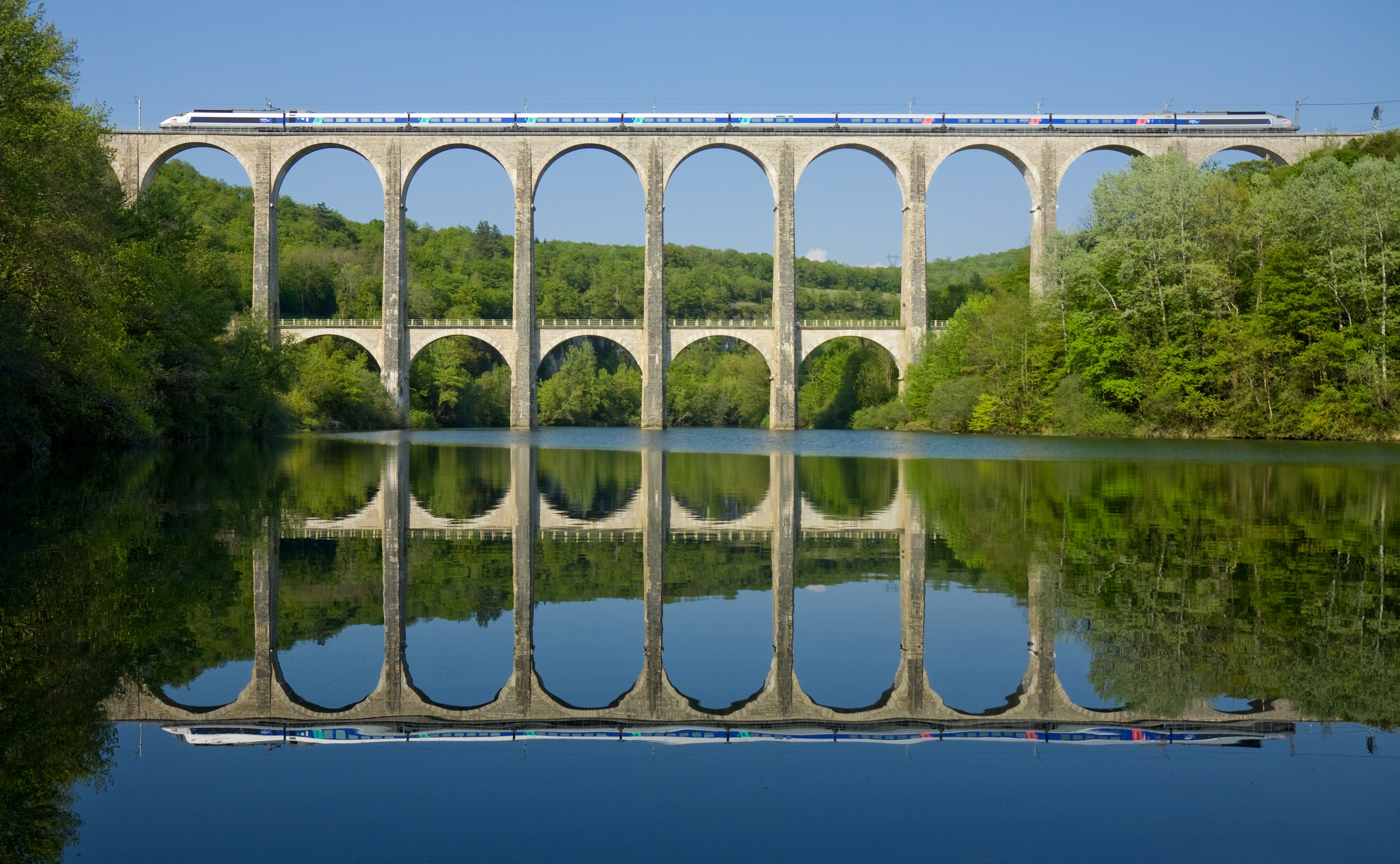
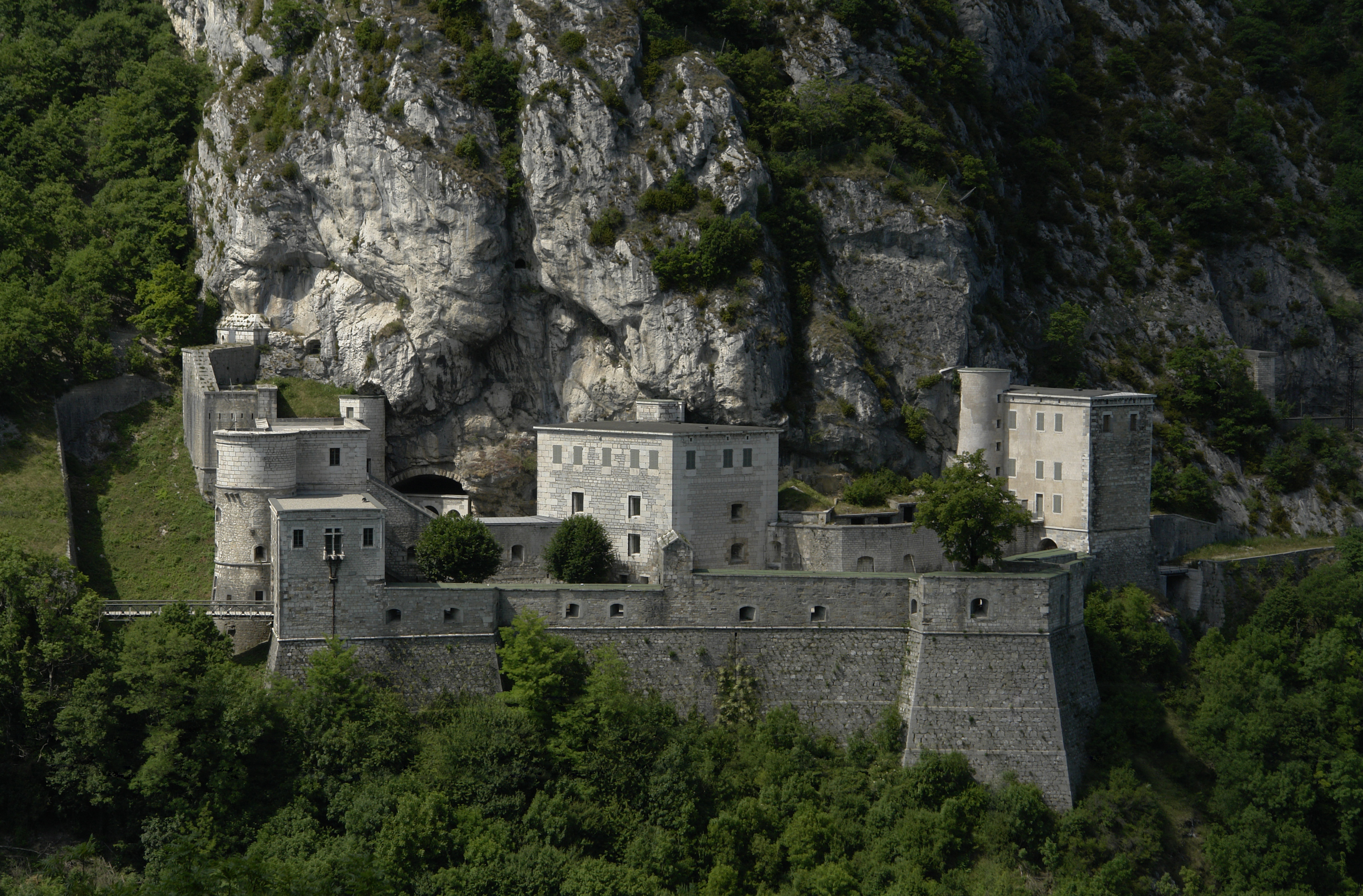
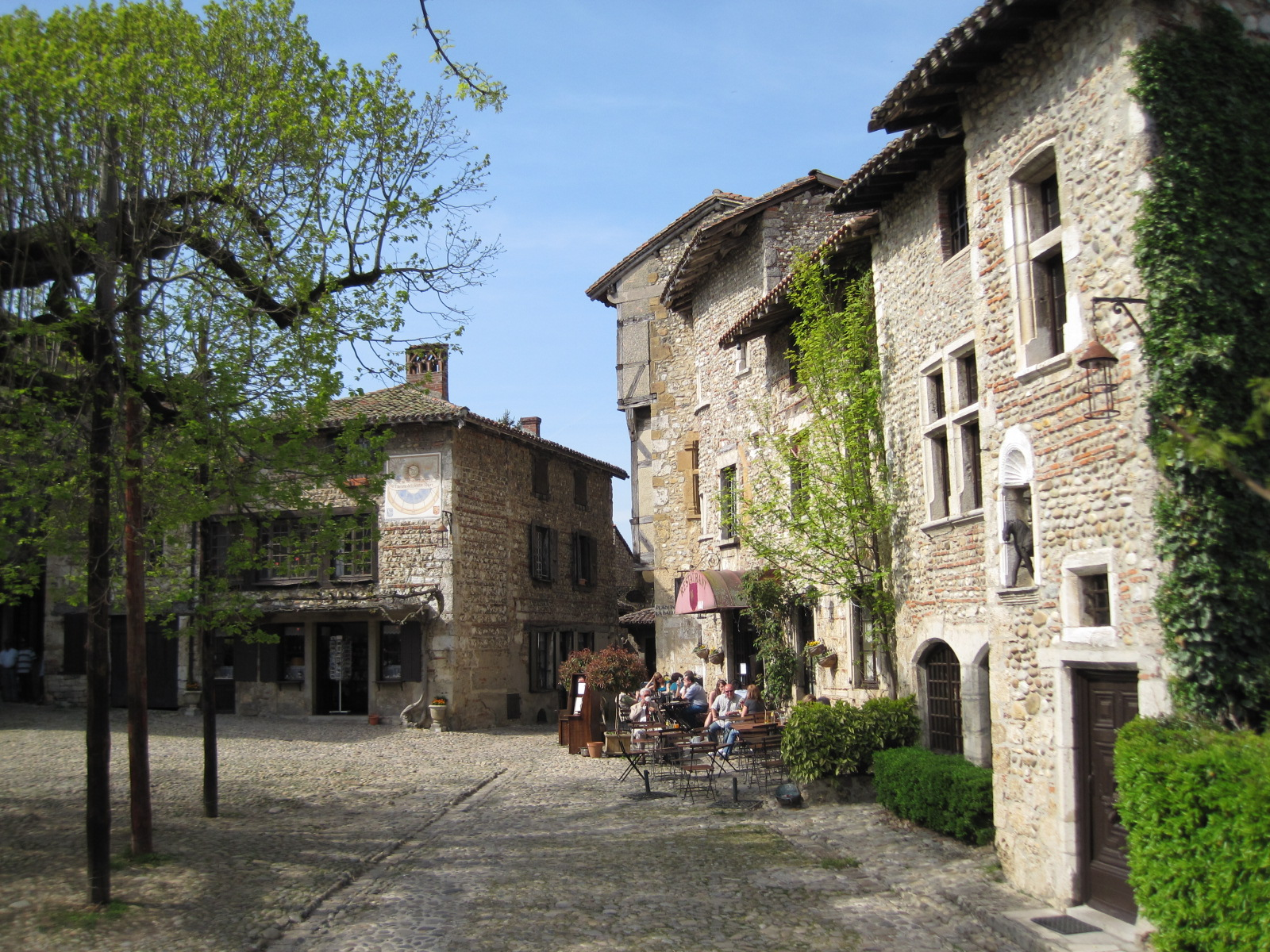
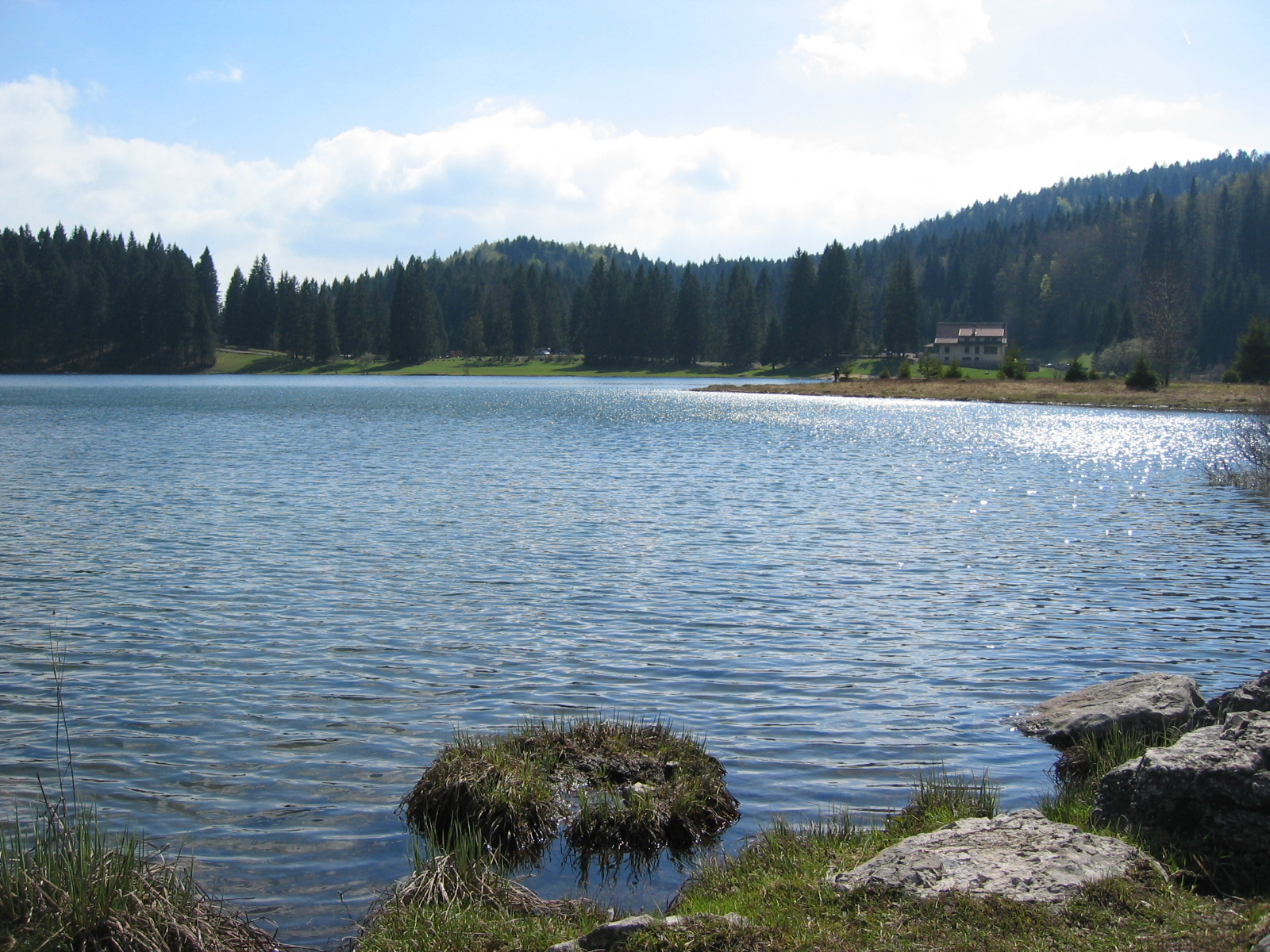
- Royal Monastery of Brou Cize–Bolozon Viaduct Fort l'Écluse Pérouges Lac Genin

- Flag Coat of arms

- Location of Ain in France
- Coordinates: 46°5′N 5°20′E
- Country: France
- Region: Auvergne-Rhône-Alpes
- Prefecture: Bourg-en-Bresse
- Subprefectures: Belley; Gex; Nantua

Government
  - President of the Departemental Council: Jean Deguerry (LR)
  - Prefect: Cécile Bigot-Dekeyzer

Area^{1}
  - Total: 5,762 km^{2} (2,225 sq mi)
- Elevation: 433 m (1,421 ft)
- Highest elevation: 1,720 m (5,640 ft)
- Lowest elevation: 170 m (560 ft)

Population (2023)
  - Total: 679,344
  - Rank: 39th
  - Density: 117.9/km^{2} (305.4/sq mi)
- Time zone: UTC+1 (CET)
  - Summer (DST): UTC+2 (CEST)
- Department number: 01
- Arrondissements: 4
- Cantons: 23
- Communes: 391
- ^1 French Land Register data, which exclude estuaries and lakes, ponds and glaciers larger than 1 km^{2}

Ain (/æ̃/; French: [ɛ̃]; Arpitan: En) is a French department in the Auvergne-Rhône-Alpes region, Eastern France. Named after the Ain river, it is bordered by the Saône and Rhône rivers. Ain is on the country's eastern edge, on the Swiss border, where it borders the cantons of Geneva and Vaud. In 2023 it had a population of 679,344.

Ain is composed of four geographically different areas - (Bresse, Dombes, Bugey and Pays de Gex) - each of which contributes to the diverse and dynamic economic development of the department. In Bresse agriculture and agro-industry are dominated by the cultivation of cereals, cattle breeding, milk and cheese production as well as poultry farming. In Dombes pisciculture assumes greater importance, as does winemaking in Bugey.

Ain's prefecture is Bourg-en-Bresse. It is bordered by Jura to the north, Saône-et-Loire to the northwest, Rhône and the Lyon Metropolis to the southwest, Isère to the south and Savoie, Haute-Savoie and Switzerland to the east.

In the alphabetical ordering of French departments, used for postal and demographic purposes among others, Ain comes first and is thus assigned the number 01 as its department number.

== History ==
The first inhabitants settled in the territory of today's Ain about 15000 BC. The menhir of Pierrefiche in Simandre-sur-Suran dates from the mid-Neolithic era, in the fourth or third millennium BC. The late-second century BC Calendar of Coligny bears the oldest surviving Gaulish inscription.

In 58 BC Julius Caesar's military action against the Helvetians, advancing through Gaul over the territory of today's Ain, marked the beginning of the Gallic Wars.

Under the Merovingians the four historic regions of the modern department belonged to the Kingdom of Burgundy. At the start of the 6th century AD the diocese of Belley (Bellicum) was created as the first bishopric in the region. Abbeys of the order of Saint Benedict were established in the valleys.

In 843 the Treaty of Verdun assigned the territories that comprised Ain to the kingdom of Lothar I (Lotharingia). The first big fiefdoms (seigneuries) emerged between 895 and 900 in Bâgé-le-Châtel, which formed the nucleus of the pays of Bresse, and in Coligny. Numerous castles were erected in a low rolling terrain that was not otherwise easily defended. In the 12th century Romanesque architecture flourished.

In the 11th century the Counts of Savoy and Valromey settled in the region of Belley. In 1272, when Sibylle de Bâgé, sole heir, married Amadeus V, Count of Savoy, they added Bresse to their domains and – by the Treaties of Paris in 1355 – the territories of Dauphiné and Gex on the right bank of the Rhône.

At the start of the 15th century almost the whole region of Ain was united under the house of Savoy. New monasteries were founded in the cities and churches were constructed or reshaped in the Gothic style of architecture.

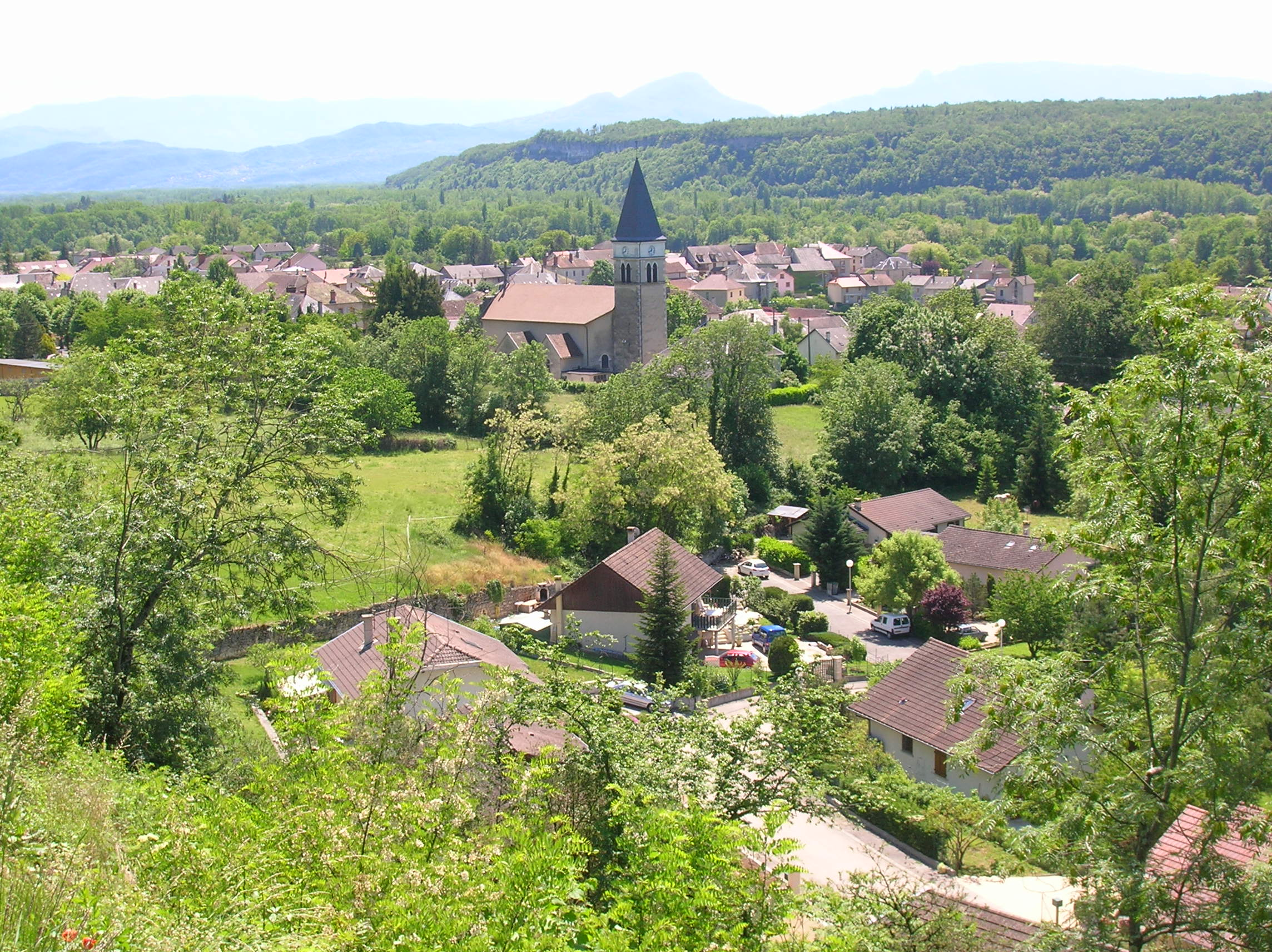
Artemare, village in the department

At the start of the 16th century the Duchy of Savoy was at the peak of its power and Ain was inherited by Margaret of Habsburg, the widow of Philibert II, Duke of Savoy. In Brou she erected a church and a monastery in late-Gothic style. Bourg-en-Bresse became a bishop's see. After Margaret's death, Francis I of France, a nephew of the Dukes of Savoy, claimed the Duchy for himself and conquered it in 1536. Following a treaty concluded in 1559 in Savoy the territory of Ain was restored to the Duke of Savoy, who immediately started fortifying it. During the Franco-Savoyard War of 1600–1601, Henri IV of France reconquered the region, although the citadel of Bourg remained impregnable. The Treaty of Lyon of 17 January 1601 finally ended the conflict. Ain now belonged to Burgundy.

In the 17th century sculpture, painting and literature prospered. During the 18th century streets and small industries emerged. On 28 March 1762 the Count of Eu, son of the Duke of Maine, ceded the region of Dombes to Louis XV.

Department of Ain in 1790

In 1790, during the French Revolution, the departments of Ain and Léman were created. Ain was subdivided into nine districts, 49 cantons (now 23 cantons) and 501 communes. The Revolution did not claim many victims in the department but it destroyed numerous valuable historical monuments. During the first French Consulate (1802) the districts were abolished. The Congress of Vienna dissolved the department of Léman and assigned the arrondissement of Gex to the department of Ain. However seven communes of Gex were given to Geneva to link Canton of Geneva with rest of Switzerland after the second Treaty of Paris was signed on 20 November 1815: Bellevue, Collex-Bossy, Meyrin, Pregny, Grand-Saconnex, Vernier and finally Versoix.

During the French Revolution and the First Empire a large number of churches were destroyed, but in 1823 the diocese of Belley was refounded. The Curé of Ars became famous. During the Second French Empire numerous churches were rebuilt, agriculture changed profoundly and the railways expanded.

Owing to its distance from the front line the department was spared the destruction of World War I (1914–1918). However the majority of the vineyards could no longer be cultivated and disappeared. Industrialization of the department began in Oyonnax and Bellegarde. Construction of the Barrage de Génissiat started in 1937.

World War II (1939–1945) struck the department of Ain hard and took its toll as 600 people were deported, half whom did not return. Commemorating this tragic era are the monument of the Maquis in Cerdon, the memorial of the children of Izieu and the museum of the resistance and deportation in Nantua.

In the second half of the 20th century industrialisation of the department proceeded, favoured by an expansive road and railway network.

== Geography ==
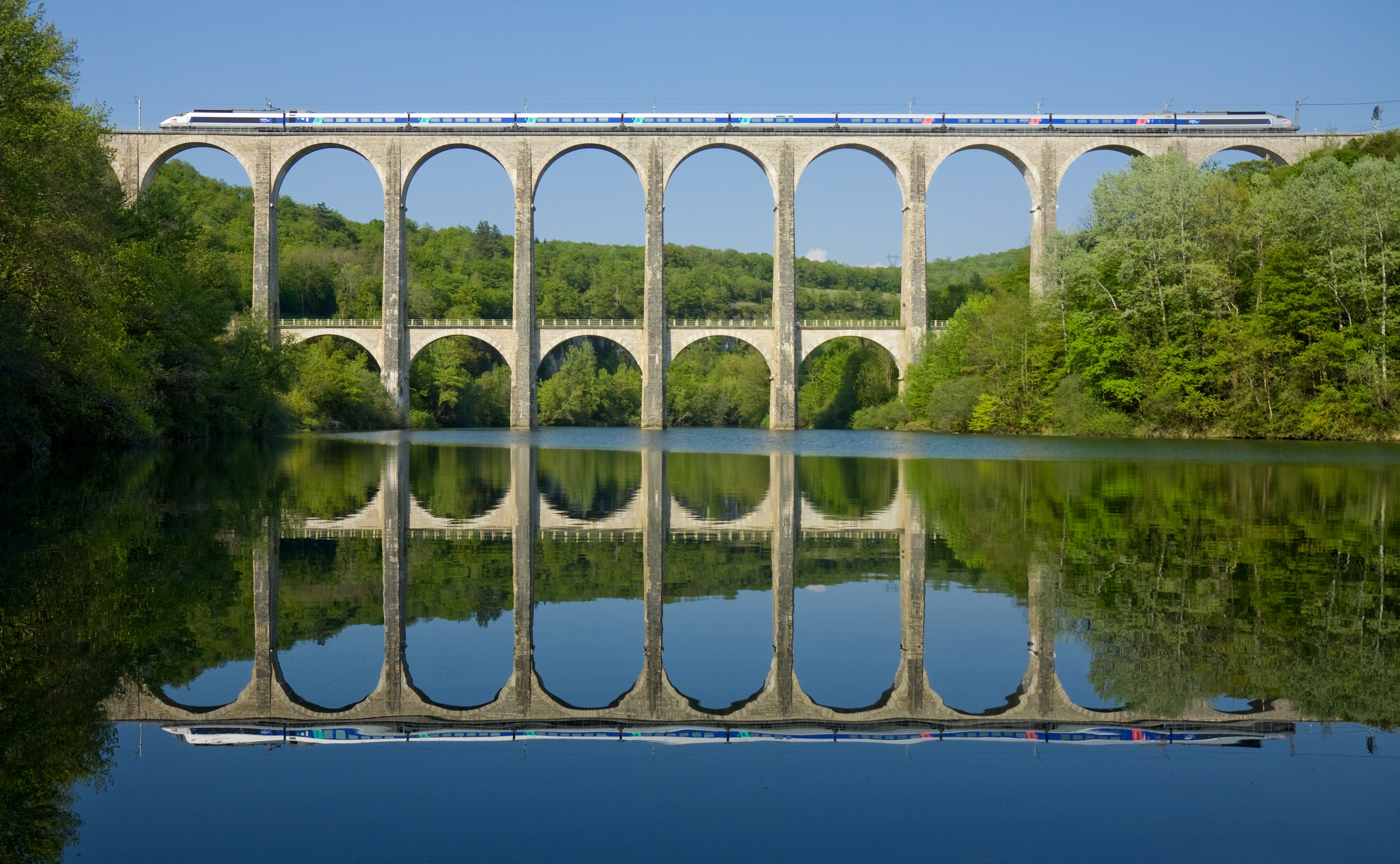
The Cize–Bolozon viaduct, a road–rail bridge crossing the Ain gorge

Ain is a department of geographic contrasts. In the north the plain of Bresse is bordered by the river Saône and rises slightly towards the north-east. In the south-east, the territory of Dombes has more than a thousand ponds and lakes. In the east, the mountain chain of the southern Jura Mountains overlook the plain of Bresse. The busy transport axes to Italy and Switzerland crisscross the valleys. The Gex region is separated from the rest of the department by the last eastern mountain chain of the Jura where the highest elevation in the department, the Crêt de la Neige (1720 m), can be found. Gex belongs geographically to the Lake Geneva basin.

The river Saône represents the western border of the department. It is fed by three smaller rivers: the Reyssouze (76 km), the Veyle (68 km) and the Chalaronne (52 km). The river Rhône forms the department's borders in the east and the south. Its main tributaries are the Suran (50 km) and notably the river Ain (190 km) which is itself fed by 118 small rivers and creeks.

=== Principal communes ===
The most populous commune is the prefecture Bourg-en-Bresse. As of 2023, there are 9 communes with more than 10,000 inhabitants:

Commune	Population (2023)
Bourg-en-Bresse	42,372
Oyonnax	22,480
Valserhône	16,712
Ambérieu-en-Bugey	15,934
Saint-Genis-Pouilly	14,432
Gex	13,627
Ferney-Voltaire	12,094
Divonne-les-Bains	10,464
Miribel	10,395

=== Transport networks ===
Ain is situated at the crossroads of a large national and international flow of commodities and is therefore an important transit region. More than 4000 km of transport routes serve the department. In addition to a well-developed transport network of former national roads, which were transferred to the department in 2007, Ain is crisscrossed by 220 km of highway.

For national and international flights, the international airports of Lyon (Saint-Exupéry) and Geneva (Cointrin) are located within a rather short distance. The department of Ain also contains two waterways, the rivers Saône and Rhone, on which building materials, such as gravel, are shipped. The most important harbour is situated in Jassans-Riottier on the river Saône.

The railway network is of great importance, in particular the TGV connections Paris–Geneva (with a stop in Bellegarde-sur-Valserine) and Paris–Lyon (passing by the Saône valley). The upgraded Ligne du Haut-Bugey was opened in 2010, reducing travel time between Paris and Geneva by 20 minutes. The regional TER (train and bus) network is important mainly as concerns the connection to Lyon.

== Demographics ==
The department of Ain is marked by very dynamic demographics. The population has grown from 471,019 inhabitants in 1990 to 679,344 in 2023 (estimates of the French statistics office INSEE). This increase is primarily due to positive migration balance and secondarily by natural growth.

The average population density is 118 inhabitants/km^{2} (2023; Auvergne-Rhône-Alpes: 117; metropolitan France: 121). While the Saône valley, the Côtière, Bourg-en-Bresse and the Gex region have a high density of population, the mountainous Bugey area is less populated.

Population development since 1791:

Historical population

Year	Pop.	±% p.a.
1791	307,756	—
1801	297,071	−0.35%
1806	304,468	+0.49%
1821	346,030	+0.86%
1831	346,188	+0.00%
1841	355,694	+0.27%
1851	372,939	+0.47%
1861	369,767	−0.09%
1872	363,290	−0.16%
1881	363,472	+0.01%
1891	356,907	−0.18%
1901	350,416	−0.18%
1911	342,482	−0.23%
1921	315,757	−0.81%

Year	Pop.	±% p.a.
1931	322,918	+0.22%
1936	316,710	−0.39%
1946	306,778	−0.32%
1954	311,941	+0.21%
1962	327,146	+0.60%
1968	339,262	+0.61%
1975	376,477	+1.50%
1982	418,516	+1.52%
1990	471,019	+1.49%
1999	515,270	+1.00%
2007	574,377	+1.37%
2012	612,191	+1.28%
2017	643,350	+1.00%
2023	679,344	+0.91%

== Higher education and research ==
Several colleges and research institutions are located in Bourg-en-Bresse, as well as one in Bellignat. In Bourg-en-Bresse, they include the Centre for University Studies, Alimentec, the Ecole Supérieure de Plasturgie, the commercial college of the Chamber of Industry and Commerce, and a branch of the Lyon faculty of education. Bellignat is home of the polytechnic for plastics engineering.

The Centre for University Studies, which was relocated from the University Jean Moulin in Lyon to Bourg-en-Bresse, has 540 students who pursue their studies in 6 different branches. They are: modern foreign languages, being English-German and English-Spanish; economic and social administration; business administration; and 3 levels of study in law. Law students may gain a diploma after 2 years of law study, a 'licence' after 3 years, or a Maîtrise after 4 years. This last corresponds to a master's degree in law and offers a specialization in commercial and trade law.

At Alimentec, altogether 700 students attend courses. Two streams of study can be followed, applied nutritional sciences or towards qualification by the commercial college of the Chamber of Industry and Commerce. The research and technology centre for applied nutritional sciences located in Bourg-en-Bresse has faculties for biology, energy sciences, informatics and biotechnology.

Also situated in Bourg-en-Bresse is a branch of the Lyon faculty of education, providing 450 places for future school teachers.

In Bellignat, at the heart of the 'plastics valley', a polytechnic university was founded in 1992, under the direct control of the Ministry of youth, education and research. The Ecole Supérieure de Plasturgie provides 140 places for future plastics engineers and utilizes a pluridisciplinary research laboratory which qualifies advanced students, notably PhD students.

Although it is headquartered just across the border in Geneva, most of CERN's Large Hadron Collider lies in parts of several communes in the Arrondissement of Gex in Ain.

== Economy ==
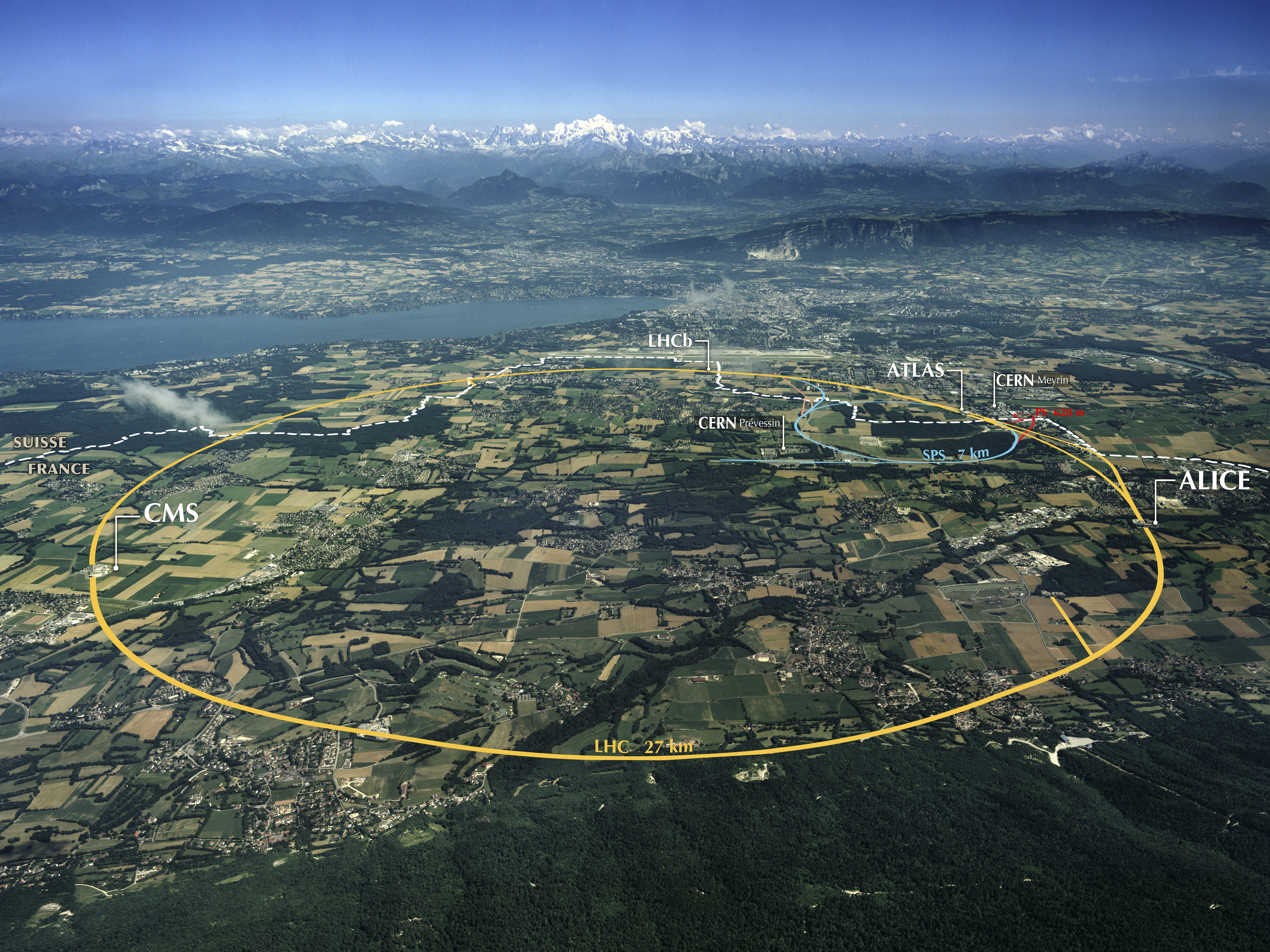
Aerial view of the Large Hadron Collider of the CERN.

=== General data ===
Ain reportedly has an unemployment rate of 5% 11,500 SMEs and a growth of 11,500 SMEs—export-oriented economy, mainly to Germany, Italy and Spain.

=== Industry ===
Despite its rural image, Ain is highly industrialised. In addition to a multitude of SME's, several big enterprises of international reputation are situated in Ain, such as: Roset-Cinna, Grosfillex, Volvo, Carrier, Smoby-Berchet, CIAT, Renault Trucks, Tréfileurope. With more than a third of all employees working in the industrial and public works sector, Ain holds 6th rank of all departments in regards to the degree of industrialisation and is the most industrialised department within the Rhône-Alpes region. The small and medium enterprises contribute most to the industrial development of the department. While enterprises with more than 500 employees represent only 27% of all industrial employment, businesses with less than 100 employees account for 47%.

The plastics industry, which is located mainly around the city of Oyonnax, is a highly productive branch of the economy and enjoys an excellent reputation. "Plastics Valley" comprises 10% of France's plastics industry which constitutes the highest concentration of plastics enterprises in Europe. The 349 enterprises which have been established here employ about 11,000 persons, more than a fourth of all employees of the tertiary sector (without public works). In the Oyonnax basin, three of four employments are directly or indirectly depending on the plastics industry.

The agricultural industry, mainly located in Bresse, accounts for more than 5,000 employees. It represents more than a fifth of the employees in the area of Bourg-en-Bresse who work in the meat industry and in tinned food factories. The emblematic poultry industry in Bresse employs only 350 persons.

In 1992 the city of Bourg-en-Bresse, the department of Ain, and the local Chamber of Industry and Commerce founded the technology platform "Alimentec". Its tasks are, among others, applied research, technical support, technology transfer and the advanced technical education in the agro-industrial sector. The activities of Alimentec focus on three priorities: ventilation systems, plastics packing and applied hygiene.

The industrial fabric of Ain is also a result of its metal processing (cables, wire drawing, electrical wires) and engineering industry (automobile industry, France's most important site for truck production) as shown by the presence of several major companies in this sector (Tréfileurope, Alcatel Cables, Renault Trucks). Foundry, metal processing and electrical industry employ approximately 8,200 workers. Due to the diversity of the activities of these industries and their dispersion over the whole department, polarisation effects similar to those in the plastics sector have not yet been observed.

Counting more than 12,900 employees, the public works sector represents a significant share of the department's economy. About a quarter of all industry employees are working in this sector. The future development of the building sector benefits from the department's economic and demographic growth.

Thanks to its vast forests (more than a third of the department's land area), the timber industry employed (in September 2007) approximately 4,500 workers.

The nuclear industry represents another economic factor. The nuclear power plant in Bugey produces about 4.2% of French electricity, employs more than 1,350 workers and secures moreover numerous employments in the enterprises of the supply chain. Every day between 300 and 1,000 external employees work in the power plant. Its importance for the local economy can not be underestimated.

Ain comprises, finally, several industrial parks. Apart from the aforementioned Plastics Valley and numerous smaller business parks which have been founded by local initiatives, the large industrial park of the plain of Ain has to be mentioned. With 700 ha, this park is forecast to become a centre for heavy industries in the Auvergne-Rhône-Alpes region.

=== Agriculture ===
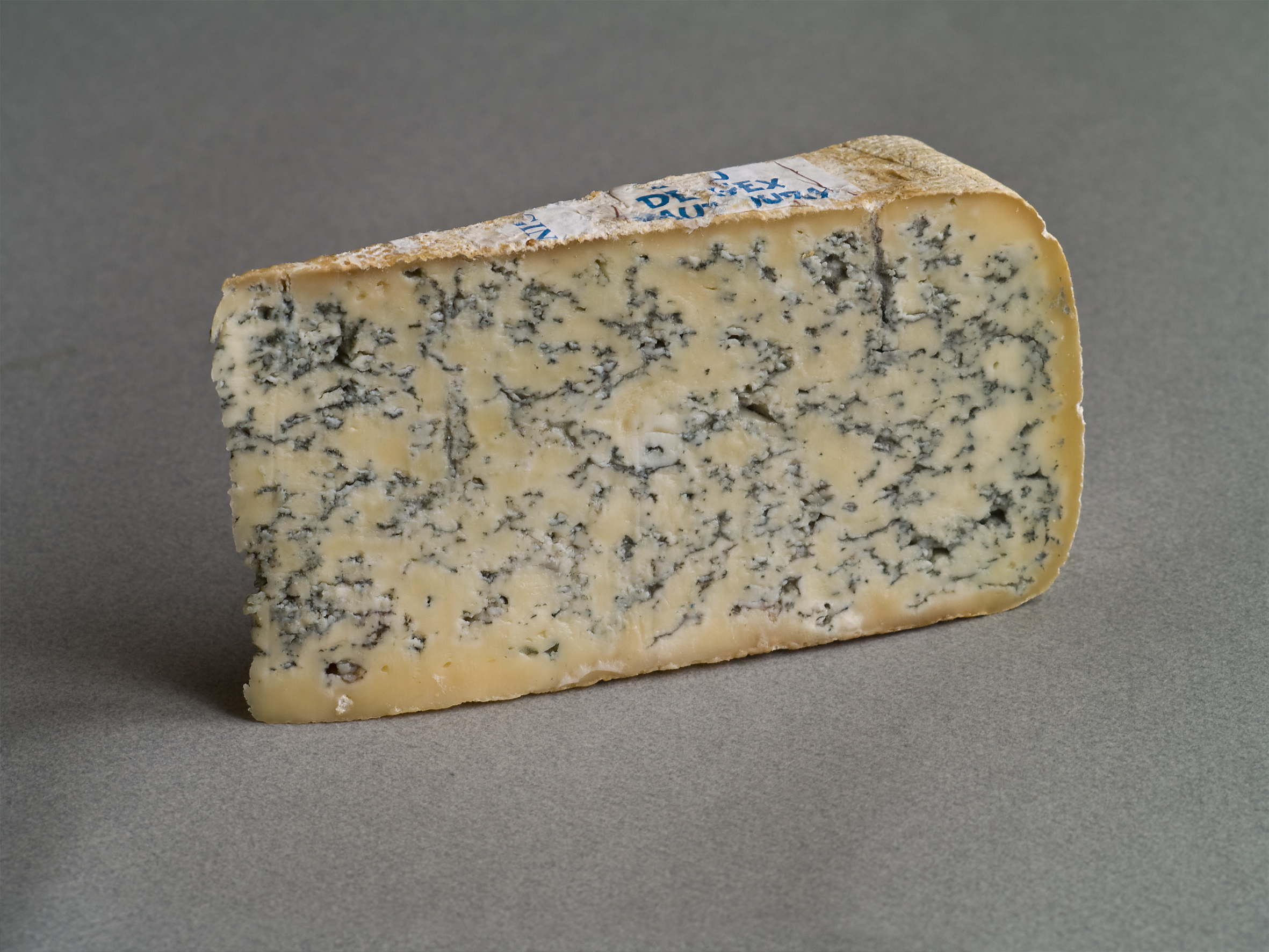
Bleu de Gex

The diversified agriculture (cattle and poultry breeding, milk and milk products, cereals, vegetables and viticulture) generates products of national and international reputation. In particular are the Bresse poultries ("volaille de Bresse"), blue cheese ("Bleu") of Gex, Grièges and Bresse, carps and sturgeons of the Dombes region as well as the wine of Bugey.

The total number of farms in the department amounts to 5,170, including 2,750 full-time farms. Over the previous 25 years the number of farms has steadily diminished. While there were 14,600 farms in 1979, only 11,320 were counted in 1988 and 6,320 in 2000. The total farm land of the department amounts to 268,361 ha, containing 150,917 ha arable farm land and 118,000 plant cultures (range land, viticulture, fruit meadows, tree nurseries). The value of the department's agricultural production reached €545 million. 52% of this amount (€274 million) is allotted to animal products (cattle, sheep, pigs, poultry, carp, milk) and 44% (€240 million) concern crop (cereals, oil plants, wine, vegetables, flowers).

=== Commerce ===
The commercial sector comprises 5,861 enterprises including 717 wholesalers and distributors (12.2%), 539 automobile dealers and garages as well as 1,643 retailers and repair businesses (28%) (source: Chamber of Industry and Commerce of Ain, 2006).

With a total of 22,973 employees and 9,000 self-employed persons, the commercial sector contributes significantly to overall employment in the department (source: Chamber of Industry and Commerce of Ain, 2006).

More than three-thirds of the expenses of the private households amounting to €4.4 billion per year are feeding the commercial businesses inside the department which stand their ground vis-à-vis external competition.

=== Services ===
The strongly expanding services sector represents 46.6% of all enterprises and about 55,000 employees (source: Chamber of Industry and Commerce of Ain, 2006). Since 2003, the services branch has employed more people than any other economic sector. Within the sector, services for enterprises represent 32.2% of the employees. Consulting and IT services are of growing importance. Educational services as well as health and social services are also sought after. They represent about a quarter of all employees in the services sector.

=== Handcraft ===
More than 9,000 handcraft businesses in Ain highlight the particular economic importance of this sector. The handcraft, which employs approximately 29,000 persons, has always been an essential element of the local economy. Within the sector, the production is of particular importance, followed by the construction, the services and the alimentary sector.

=== Tourism ===
In economic terms, tourism in Ain means €300 million of business volume and 10,000 direct jobs as well as another 10,000 indirect employments. In December 2006, 2.9% of the department's employment was related to the tourist sector (source: Committee for Tourism in the Department of Ain, 2006).

In 2006, 700,000 tourists visited sites of interest in the department (museums, castles, religious monuments, gardens and caves). During the winter of 2006/2007, winter sports activity was strongly restrained by the lack of snow. The number of daily skiing tourists amounted to 238,000 (180,500 for alpine skiing and 57,000 for cross-country skiing). The previous average amounted to 465,000 daily tourists per winter.

Angling and cycling tourism (27 circuits with altogether more than 1,500 km) attracts numerous visitors each year. The hotel and hospitality sector counts about 1,100 establishments (hotels, camping grounds, bed and breakfast (so-called "gîtes"), holiday apartments, guest rooms etc.). Their joined capacity amounts to 40,850 beds. During the 2006 season, 2.5 million nights were spent in the department compared to 2.7 million in 2002 (source: Committee for Tourism in the Department of Ain, 2006). 15,000 hunters are registered in the department, 3,000 to 4,000 of whom hunt in Dombes, one of the best hunting regions for water birds in France.

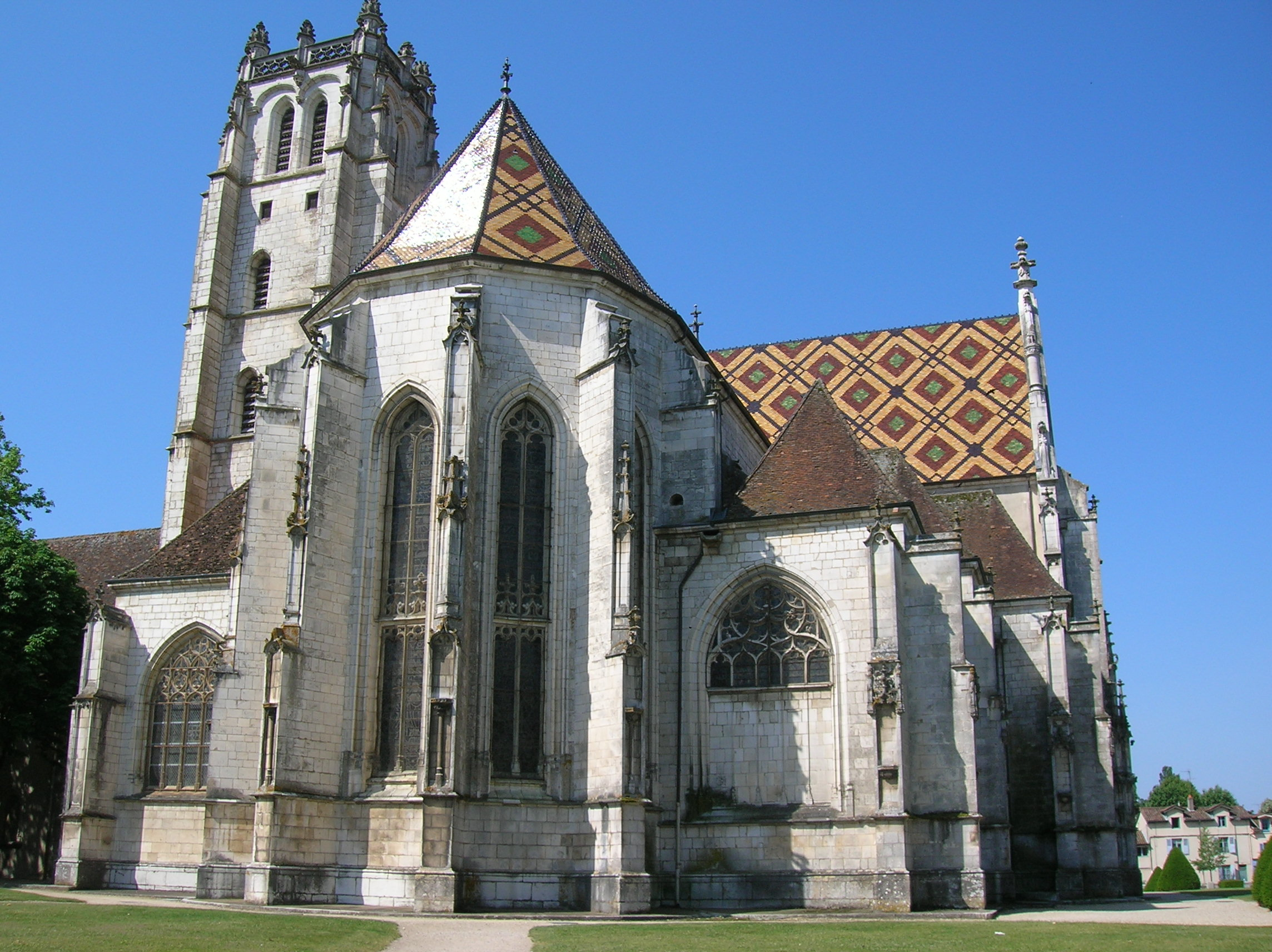
The Royal Monastery of Brou in Bourg-en-Bresse

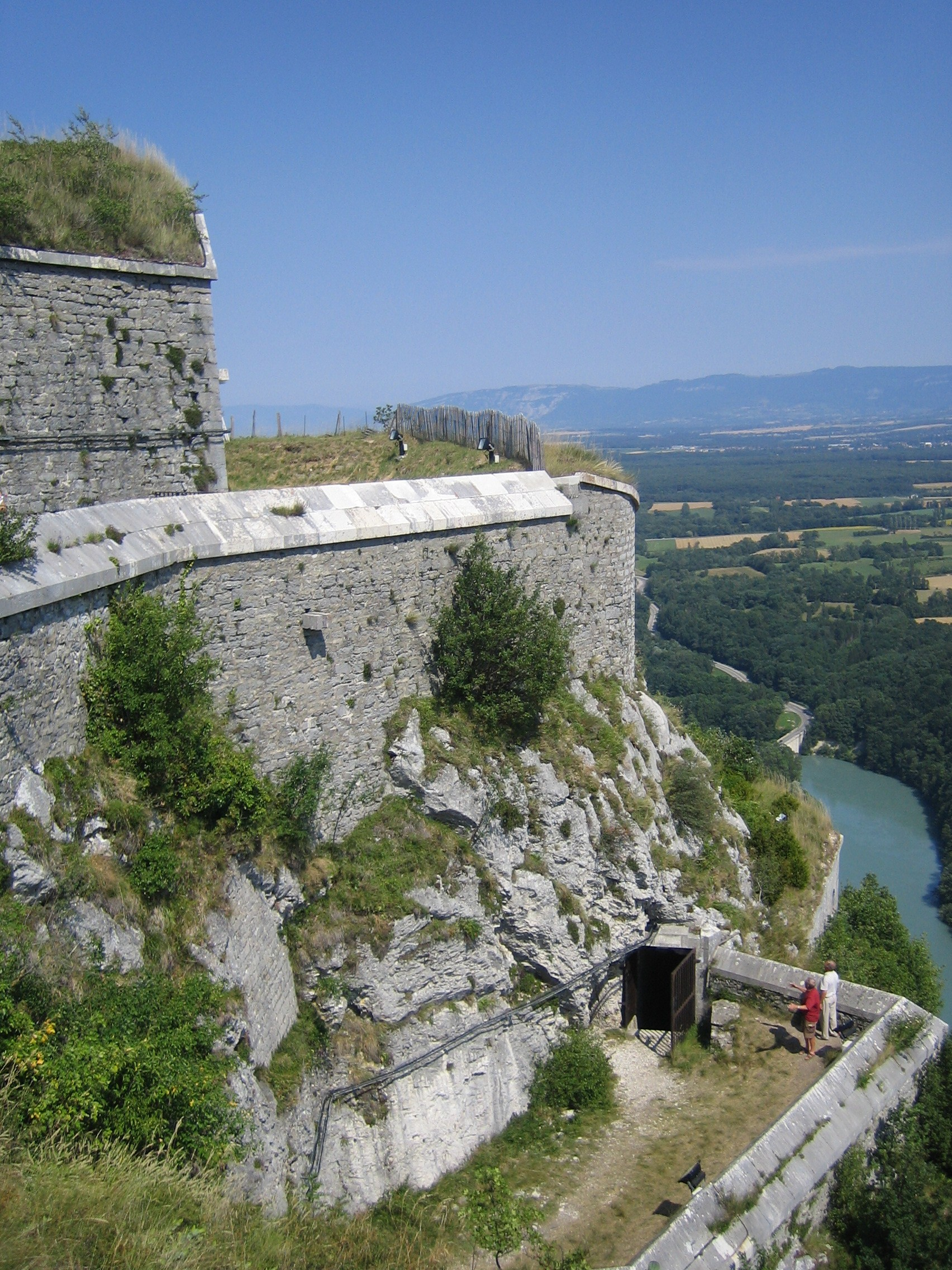
Fort l'Écluse

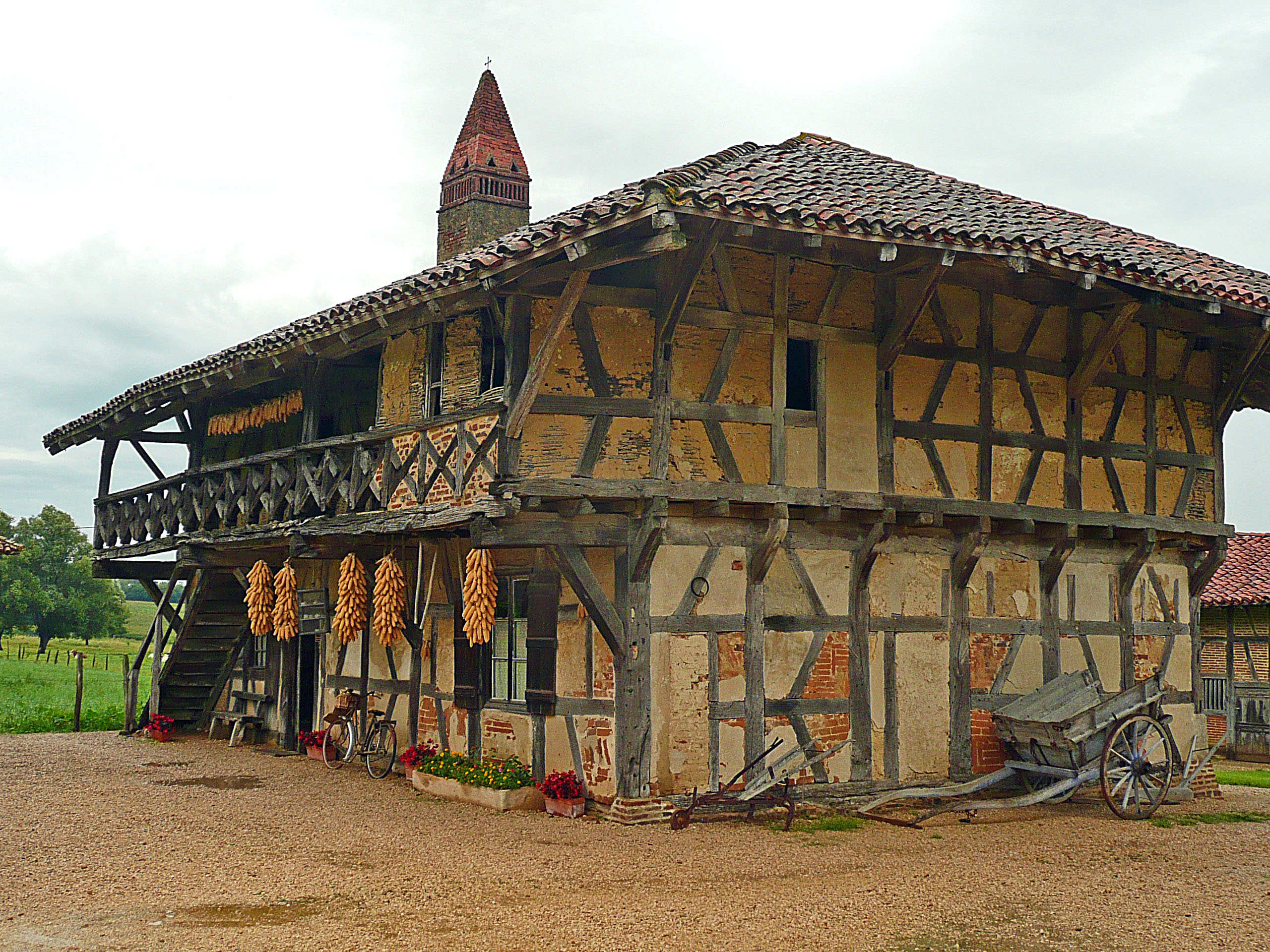
Medieval farm of Saint-Trivier-de-Courtes

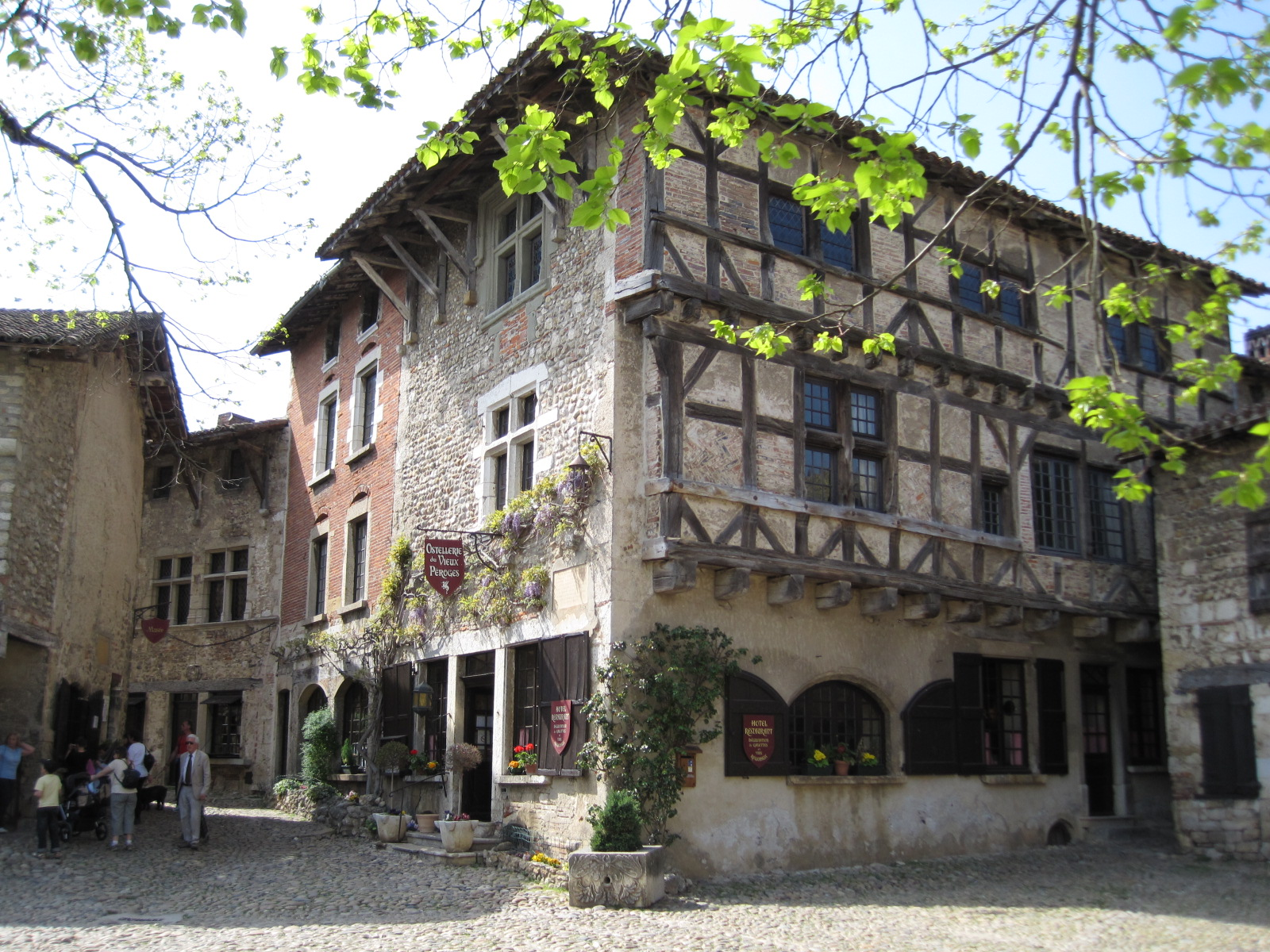
Pérouges, one of the most beautiful villages of France

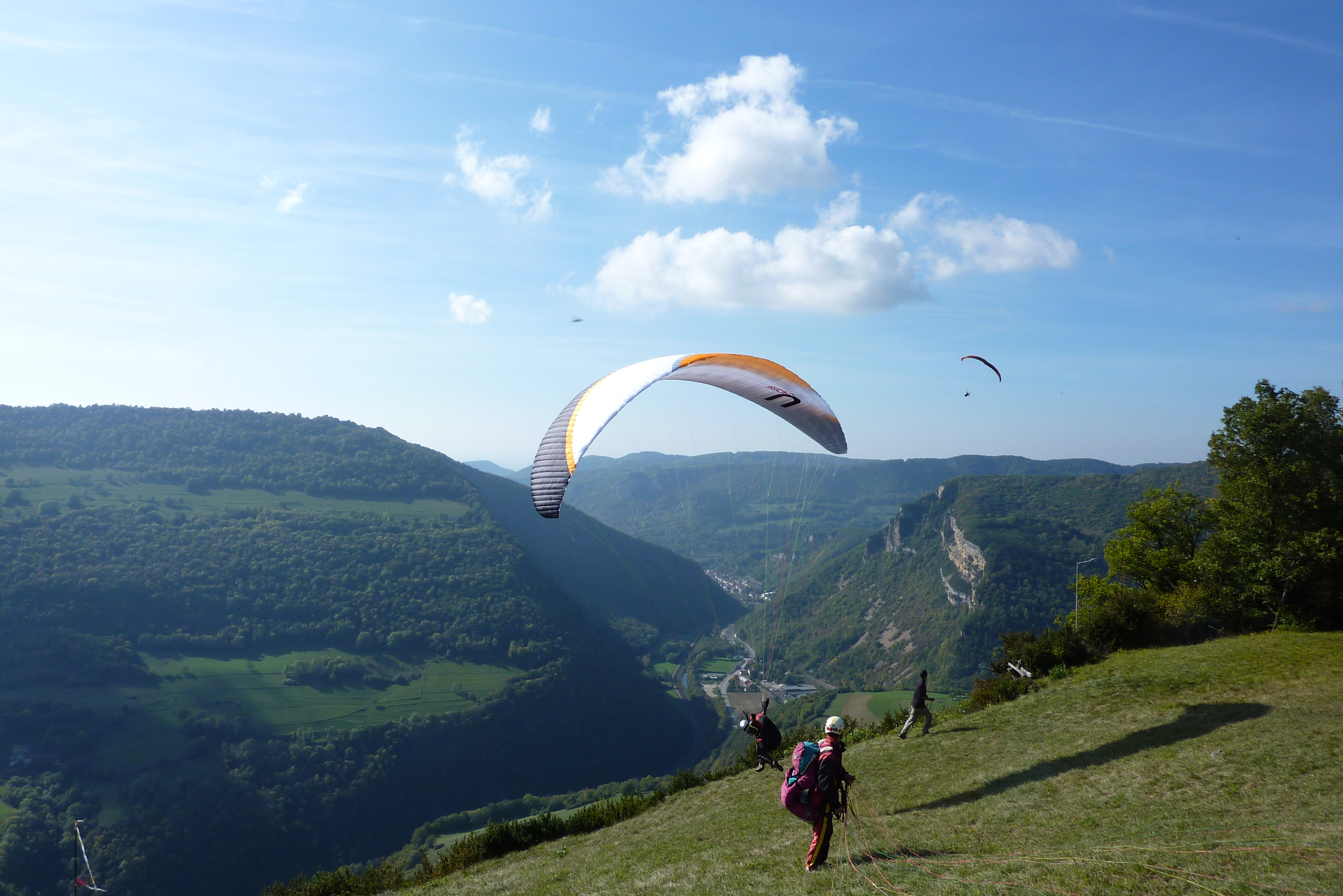
Paragliding in Ain

== Administration and representatives ==
=== Administrative organisation ===
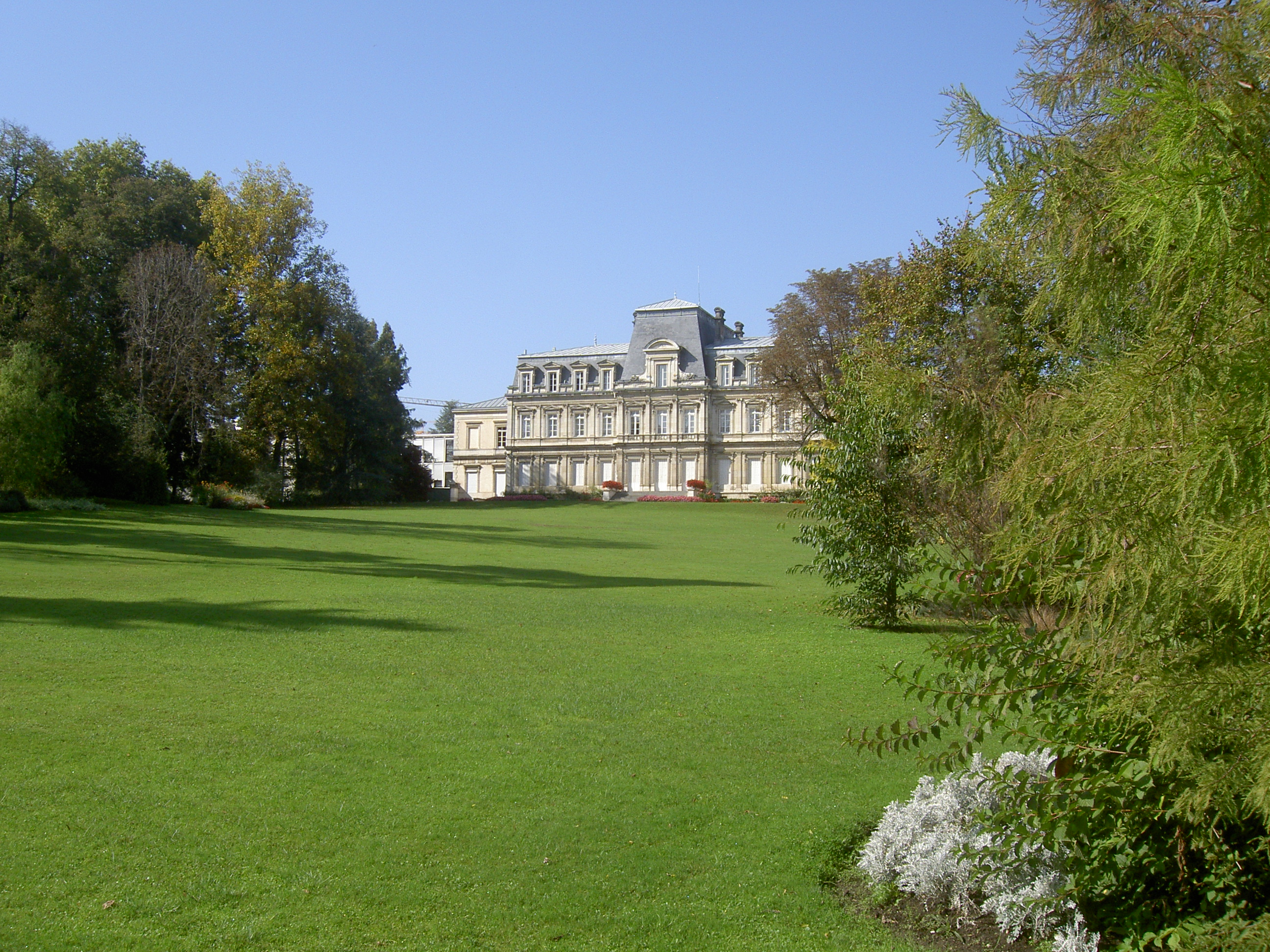
Prefecture (view from the park)

The department of Ain consists of 4 arrondissements, 23 cantons and 391 communes.

Arrondissement	Area (km^{2})	Communes
Belley	1584	103
Bourg-en-Bresse	2874	199
Gex	405	27
Nantua	900	62

=== Arrondissements, cantons and communes of the department ===
- Arrondissements of the Ain department
- Cantons of the Ain department
- Communes of the Ain department

=== Corps of Prefects ===
Laurent Touvet	Prefect	since July 2013
Caroline Gadou	Secretary-General, Sub-Prefect of the arrondissement Bourg-en-Bresse	since July 2014
Rémi Bourdu	Chief of Cabinet and Sub-Prefect	since July 2013
Chantal Guélot	Sub-Prefect of the arrondissement Belley	since February 2013
Stéphane Donnot	Sub-Prefect of the arrondissement Gex	since October 2012
Éléodie Sches	Sub-Prefect of the arrondissement Nantua	since August 2012

=== Departmental Council ===
Jean Deguerry of The Republicans (formerly Union for a popular movement) has been president of the Departmental Council since 2017. In the 2021 departmental election, the Departmental Council of Ain was elected as follows:

Party	Seats
Centre-right	28
Right	8
Miscellaneous right	4
The Republicans	2
Miscellaneous left	2
Left	2

=== Representatives in the National Assembly and the Senate ===
The Senators for Ain are Sylvie Goy-Chavent (Union of Democrats and Independents), Florence Blatrix-Contat (Socialist Party) and Patrick Chaize (The Republicans).

Constituency	Member	Party
Ain's 1st constituency	Xavier Breton	The Republicans
Ain's 2nd constituency	Romain Daubié	MoDem
Ain's 3rd constituency	Olga Givernet	Renaissance
Ain's 4th constituency	Jérôme Buisson	National Rally
Ain's 5th constituency	Marc Chavent	Union of the Right for the Republic

== See also ==
- Chizerots
- List of senators of Ain
- Communes of the Ain department
- Récif fossile de Marchon - Christian Gourrat Regional Nature Reserve
