= List of deputies of the 11th National Assembly of France =

List by constituency of the 577 deputies of the 11th French National Assembly (1997–2002) elected in the 1997 French legislative election.

== List of deputies by departments ==
Constituency	Name	Photo	Party	Birthdate	Birthplace
Ain's 1st constituency	André Godin		PS	May 18, 1942	Bourg-en-Bresse
Ain's 2nd constituency	Lucien Guichon		RPR	Feb 9, 1932	Oyonnax
Ain's 3rd constituency	Étienne Blanc		UDF	Nov 12, 1945	Belley
Ain's 4th constituency	Michel Voisin		UDF	Oct 6, 1944	Replonges
Aisne's 1st constituency	René Dosière		PS	Aug 3, 1941	Origny-Sainte-Benoite
Aisne's 2nd constituency	Odette Grzegrzulka		PS	Mar 1, 1947	Paris
Aisne's 3rd constituency	Jean-Pierre Balligand		PS	May 30, 1950	La Neuville-lès-Dorengt
Aisne's 4th constituency	Jacques Desallangre		MDC	Sep 6, 1935	Châlons-en-Champagne
Aisne's 5th constituency	Renaud Dutreil		UDF	Jun 12, 1960	Chambéry
Allier's 1st constituency	François Colcombet		PS	Sep 1, 1937	Dompierre-sur-Besbre
Allier's 2nd constituency	Pierre Goldberg		PCF	Aug 25, 1938	Chouvigny
Allier's 3rd constituency	André Lajoinie		PCF	Dec 26, 1929	Chasteaux
Allier's 4th constituency	Gérard Charasse		PRS	Mar 26, 1944	Le Vernet
Alpes de Haute Provence's 1st constituency	Jean-Louis Bianco		PS	Jan 12, 1943	Neuilly-sur-Seine
Alpes de Haute Provence's 2nd constituency	Robert Honde		PRS	Mar 1, 1942	Toulon
Hautes-Alpes' 1st constituency	Daniel Chevallier		PS	Sep 12, 1943	Veynes
Hautes-Alpes' 2nd constituency	Patrick Ollier		RPR	Dec 17, 1944	Périgueux
Alpes Maritimes' 1st constituency	Charles Ehrmann		UDF	Oct 7, 1911	Paris
Alpes Maritimes' 2nd constituency	Jacques Peyrat		RPR	Oct 18, 1931	Belfort
Alpes Maritimes' 3rd constituency	Rudy Salles		UDF	Jul 30, 1954	Nice
Alpes Maritimes' 4th constituency	Jean-Claude Guibal		RPR	Jan 13, 1941	Ajaccio
Alpes Maritimes' 5th constituency	Christian Estrosi		RPR	Jul 1, 1955	Nice
Alpes Maritimes' 6th constituency	Lionnel Luca		RPR	Dec 19, 1954	Boulogne-Billancourt
Alpes Maritimes' 7th constituency	Jean-Antoine Leonetti		UDF	Jul 9, 1948	Marseille
Alpes Maritimes' 8th constituency	Bernard Brochand		RPR	Jun 5, 1938	Nice
Alpes Maritimes' 9th constituency	André Aschieri		Les Verts	Mar 8, 1937	Mouans-Sartoux
Ardèche's 1st constituency	Pascal Terrasse		PS	Oct 26, 1964	Bagnols-sur-Cèze
Ardèche's 2nd constituency	Jacques Dondoux		PRS	Nov 16, 1931	Lyon
Ardèche's 3rd constituency	Stéphane Alaize		PS	Mar 16, 1964	La Tronche
Ardennes' 1st constituency	Claudine Ledoux		PS	Jan 10, 1959	Givet
Ardennes' 2nd constituency	Philippe Vuilque		PS	Jan 29, 1956	Charleville-Mézières
Ardennes' 3rd constituency	Jean-Luc Warsmann		RPR	Oct 22, 1965	Villers-Semeuse
Ariège's 1st constituency	Augustin Bonrepaux		PS	Aug 11, 1936	Perles-et-Castelet
Ariège's 2nd constituency	Henri Nayrou		PS	Nov 21, 1944	Suc-et-Santenac
Aube's 1st constituency	Pierre Micaux		UDF	Oct 26, 1930	Vendeuvre-sur-Barse
Aube's 2nd constituency	Robert Galley		RPR	Jan 11, 1921	Paris
Aube's 3rd constituency	François Baroin		RPR	Jun 21, 1965	Paris
Aude's 1st constituency	Jean-Claude Perez		PS	Mar 31, 1964	Carcassonne
Aude's 2nd constituency	Jacques Bascou		PS	Mar 31, 1953	Castelnaudary
Aude's 3rd constituency	Jean-Paul Dupré		PS	Feb 5, 1944	Davejean
Aveyron's 1st constituency	Jean Briane		UDF	Oct 20, 1930	Quins
Aveyron's 2nd constituency	Jean Rigal		PRS	Jun 28, 1931	Rodez
Aveyron's 3rd constituency	Jacques Godfrain		RPR	Jun 4, 1943	Toulouse
Bouches-du-Rhône's 1st constituency	Roland Blum		UDF	Jul 12, 1945	Les Pennes-Mirabeau
Bouches-du-Rhône's 2nd constituency	Jean-François Mattei		UDF	Jan 14, 1943	Lyon
Bouches-du-Rhône's 3rd constituency	Jean Roatta		UDF	Dec 13, 1941	Marseille
Bouches-du-Rhône's 4th constituency	Guy Hermier		PCF	Feb 22, 1940	Créteil
Bouches-du-Rhône's 5th constituency	Renaud Muselier		RPR	May 6, 1959	Marseille
Bouches-du-Rhône's 6th constituency	Guy Teissier		UDF	Apr 4, 1945	Marseille
Bouches-du-Rhône's 7th constituency	Sylvie Andrieux		PS	Dec 15, 1961	Marseille
Bouches-du-Rhône's 8th constituency	Marius Masse		PS	Apr 15, 1941	Marseille
Bouches-du-Rhône's 9th constituency	Jean Tardito		PCF	Dec 19, 1933	La Ciotat
Bouches-du-Rhône's 10th constituency	Roger Meï		PCF	May 3, 1935	Hyères
Bouches-du-Rhône's 11th constituency	Christian Kert		UDF	Jul 25, 1946	Salon-de-Provence
Bouches-du-Rhône's 12th constituency	Henri d'Attilio		PS	Feb 4, 1927	Châteauneuf-les-Martigues
Bouches-du-Rhône's 13th constituency	Michel Vaxès		PCF	Nov 14, 1940	Marseille
Bouches-du-Rhône's 14th constituency	Jean-Bernard Raimond		RPR	Feb 6, 1926	Paris
Bouches-du-Rhône's 15th constituency	Léon Vachet		RPR	Dec 29, 1932	Châteaurenard
Bouches-du-Rhône's 16th constituency	Michel Vauzelle		PS	Aug 15, 1944	Montélimar
Calvados's 1st constituency	Philippe Duron		PS	Jun 19, 1947	Antony, Hauts-de-Seine
Calvados's 2nd constituency	Louis Mexandeau		PS	6 July 1931	Wanquetin, Pas-de-Calais
Calvados's 3rd constituency	Yvette Roudy		PS	10 April 1929	Pessac, France
Calvados's 4th constituency	Nicole Ameline		UDF	4 July 1952	Saint-Vaast-en-Auge, Calvados
Calvados's 5th constituency	Laurence Dumont		PS	Jun 19, 1947	Vincennes
Calvados's 6th constituency	Alain Tourret		PRS	25 December 1947	Boppard, Germany
