= Allier deputies to the eighth legislature of the French Fifth Republic =

Unlike the other legislatures of the Fifth French Republic, the eighth legislature from 1986 to 1988 had proportional representation by department.

This table summarises representatives from Allier in the 7th, 8th and 9th legislatures.

Constituency	7th legislature	8th legislature	9th legislature
1st	Jean-Paul Desgranges, PS	Hector Rolland, RPR Jacques Lacarin, UDF-PR André Lajoinie, PCF Jean-Michel Belorgey, PS	François Colcombet, DVG
2nd	Albert Chaubard, PS	Hector Rolland, RPR Jacques Lacarin, UDF-PR André Lajoinie, PCF Jean-Michel Belorgey, PS	Pierre Goldberg, PCF
3rd	André Lajoinie, PCF	Hector Rolland, RPR Jacques Lacarin, UDF-PR André Lajoinie, PCF Jean-Michel Belorgey, PS	André Lajoinie, PCF
4th	Jean-Michel Belorgey, PS	Hector Rolland, RPR Jacques Lacarin, UDF-PR André Lajoinie, PCF Jean-Michel Belorgey, PS	Jean-Michel Belorgey, PS
