= Ain's 1st constituency =

Constituency of the National Assembly of France

- Constituency for the National Assembly
- Boundary of Ain's 1st constituency in Ain

- Location of Ain within France
- Department: Ain
- Region: Auvergne-Rhône-Alpes
- Population: 115,683 (2013)
- Electorate: 82,673 (2017)

Current constituency
- Deputy: Xavier Breton
- Political party: LR
- Parliamentary group: LR

Ain's 1st constituency is one of five French legislative constituencies in the department of Ain. It is currently represented by Xavier Breton of The Republicans (LR).

== Historic representation ==
Legislature	Start of mandate	End of mandate	Deputy	Party
1st	9 December 1958	9 October 1962	Amédée Mercier	SFIO
2nd	6 December 1962	2 April 1967	Paul Barberot	MRP
3rd	3 April 1967	30 May 1968	Paul Barberot	CD
4th	11 July 1968	1 April 1973	Paul Barberot	CD
5th	2 April 1973	2 April 1978	Paul Barberot	CDP
6th	3 April 1978	22 May 1981	Jacques Boyon	RPR
7th	2 July 1981	1 April 1986	Louis Robin	PS
8th	2 April 1986	14 May 1988	Proportional representation	
9th	23 June 1988	1 April 1993	Jacques Boyon	RPR
10th	2 April 1993	21 April 1997	Jacques Boyon	RPR
11th	12 June 1997	18 June 2002	André Godin	PS
12th	19 June 2002	19 June 2007	Jean-Michel Bertrand	UMP
13th	20 June 2007	19 June 2012	Xavier Breton	UMP
14th	20 June 2012	20 June 2017	Xavier Breton	UMP
15th	21 June 2017	21 June 2022	Xavier Breton	LR
16th	22 June 2022	9 June 2024 (Note: Mandate cut short due to the parliamentary dissolution by Emmanuel Macron.)	Xavier Breton	LR
17th	8 July 2024	ongoing	Xavier Breton	LR

== Elections ==
=== 2024 ===
Candidate	Party	Alliance	First round			Second round		
Candidate	Party	Alliance	Votes	%	+/–	Votes	%	+/–
Xavier Breton	LR		14,495	23.96	-1.39	33,889	56.48	
Christophe Maître	RN		23,819	39.37	+17.91	26,116	43.52	
Sébastien Gueraud	PS	NFP	14,188	23.45	-0.42	WITHDREW		
Vincent Guillermin	RE	ENS	7,063	11.68	-7.62			
Éric Lahy	LO		419	0.69	-0.25			
Michael Mendes	DLF		314	0.52	-1.01			
Cyril Vincent	DIV		197	0.33	N/A			
Valid votes			60,495	97.84	-0.46	60,005	96.30	
Blank votes			929	1.50	+0.35	1,797	2.88	
Null votes			406	0.66	+0.11	509	0.82	
Turnout			61,830	71.20	+21.85	62,311	71.74	
Abstentions			25,013	28.80	-21.85			
Registered voters			86,843					
Source: Ministry of the Interior, Le Monde
Result						LR HOLD		

=== 2022 ===
Candidate	Party	Alliance	First round		Second round	
Candidate	Party	Alliance	Votes	%	Votes	%
Xavier Breton	LR	UDC	10,599	25.35	24,407	63.22
Sébastien Guéraud	PS	NUPES	9,982	23.87	14,202	36.78
Brigitte Piroux Giannotti	RN		8,971	21.46		
Vincent Guillermin	Agir	Ensemble	8,071	19.30		
Julien Bellon	REC		1,995	4.77		
Eliane Armenjon	PA		1,161	2.78		
Michael Mendes	DLF	DSV	641	1.53		
Éric Lahy	LO		391	0.94		
Valid votes			41,811	98.30	38,611	94.76
Blank votes			490	1.15	1,590	3.90
Null votes			234	0.55	547	1.34
Turnout			42,535	49.35	40,748	47.27
Abstentions			43,652	50.65	45,446	52.73
Registered voters			86,187		86,194	
Result			LR HOLD			

=== 2017 ===
Candidate	Label	First round		Second round	
Candidate	Label	Votes	%	Votes	%
Laurent Mallet	MoDem	13,534	33.89	15,114	46.25
Xavier Breton	LR	10,693	26.78	17,564	53.75
Jérôme Buisson	FN	6,174	15.46		
Fabrine Martin-Zemlik	FI	3,874	9.70		
Florence Blatrix-Contat	PS	3,687	9.23		
Jacques Fontaine	PCF	656	1.64		
Laurane Raimondo	ECO	562	1.41		
Maude Lépagnot	EXG	293	0.73		
Marie Carlier	DIV	247	0.62		
Gilbert Bonnot	DIV	211	0.53		
Votes		39,931	100.00	32,678	100.00
Valid votes		39,931	98.28	32,678	91.46
Blank votes		545	1.34	2,245	6.28
Null votes		155	0.38	805	2.25
Turnout		40,631	49.13	35,728	43.22
Abstentions		42,063	50.87	46,945	56.78
Registered voters		82,694		82,673	
Source: Ministry of the Interior

=== 2012 ===
Candidate	Label	First round		Second round	
Candidate	Label	Votes	%	Votes	%
Jean-François Debat	PS	18,312	38.92	22,743	48.41
Xavier Breton	UMP	17,716	37.65	24,233	51.59
Clément Perrin	FN	7,290	15.49		
Sébastien Boileau	FG	1,520	3.23		
Nadia Allouache	EELV	1,161	2.47		
Grégory Baudouin	DVD	296	0.63		
Muriel Van der Vossen	ECO	226	0.48		
Jacques Fléchon	DVD	220	0.47		
Carole Guénard-Gerbaud	EXG	171	0.36		
Maude Lépagnot	EXG	141	0.30		
Votes		47,053	100.00	46,976	100.00
Valid votes		47,053	99.00	46,976	98.07
Blank or null votes		476	1.00	924	1.93
Turnout		47,529	60.11	47,900	60.58
Abstentions		31,537	39.89	31,172	39.42
Registered voters		79,066		79,072	
Source: Ministry of the Interior

=== 2007 ===
Candidate	Label	First round		Second round	
Candidate	Label	Votes	%	Votes	%
Xavier Breton	UMP	24,250	47.24	27,739	53.66
Jean-François Debat	PS	16,415	31.98	23,953	46.34
Marc Pariot	UDF–MoDem	2,860	5.57		
Marie-Lucienne Catherin	FN	2,086	4.06		
Monique Duthu	LV	1,411	2.75		
Carole Guénard-Gerbaud	EXG	1,162	2.26		
Jacques Fléchon	MPF	1,078	2.10		
Pierre Aviniere	PCF	789	1.54		
Bernard Favre	ECO	530	1.03		
Odile Huret	DIV	448	0.87		
Éric Lahy	EXG	300	0.58		
Votes		51,329	100.00	51,692	100.00
Valid votes		51,329	98.57	51,692	98.09
Blank or null votes		744	1.43	1,009	1.91
Turnout		52,073	60.12	52,701	60.85
Abstentions		34,540	39.88	33,907	39.15
Registered voters		86,613		86,608	
Source: Ministry of the Interior

=== 2002 ===
Candidate	Label	First round		Second round	
Candidate	Label	Votes	%	Votes	%
Jean-Michel Bertrand	UMP	2,397	42.49	26,697	57.40
André Godin	PS	16,734	33.23	19,817	42.60
Armelled Benanisdon	FN	5,630	11.18		
France Besson	LMR	899	1.79		
Herve The Maout	MPF	803	1.59		
Annick Veillerot	MNR	781	1.55		
Noelle Favier	PCF	737	1.46		
Carole Guenard-Gerbaud	RCL	713	1.42		
Bernard Favre	LV	627	1.25		
Jean Pierre Cotton	EXG	597	1.19		
Beatrice Durand	PR	555	1.10		
Eric Lahy	LO	414	0.82		
Leo Solmont	LV	216	0.43		
Jean Michel Boulme	EXG	191	0.38		
Bovis Olivier	DIV	64	0.13		
Votes		50,358	100.00	46,514	100.00
Valid votes		50,358	98.25	46,514	97.13
Blank or null votes		897	1.75	1,375	2.87
Turnout		51,255	6.64	47,889	59.46
Abstentions		29,279	36.36	32,646	40.54
Registered voters		80,534		80,535	
Source: Ministry of the Interior

=== 1997 ===
Candidate	Party	Alliance	First round		Second round	
Candidate	Party	Alliance	Votes	%	Votes	%
André Godin	PS		14,666	31.23	25,685	50.28
Jacques Boyon	RPR		14,048	29.91	25,396	49.72
Annick Veillerot	FN		7,476	15.92		
Vincent Guillermin	UDF		2,583	5.50		
Monique Duthu	LV		2,455	5.23		
Lionel Mornet	PCF		2,185	4.65		
Hervé Le Maout	MPF	LDI	1,310	2.79		
Yves Petiot	LO		1,047	2.23		
Carole Gerbaud	CAP		569	1.21		
Bernard Favre	MEI		554	1.18		
Gilbert Bonnot	DVG		69	0.15		
Valid votes			46,965	94.63	51,081	94.16
Blank votes			2,663	5.37	3,168	5.84
Null votes			2,663	5.37	3,168	5.84
Turnout			49,628	65.6	54,249	71.72
Abstentions			26,021	34.4	21,394	28.28
Registered voters			75,649		75,643	
Result			PS GAIN			

=== 1993 ===
Candidate	Party	Alliance	First round		Second round	
Candidate	Party	Alliance	Votes	%	Votes	%
Jacques Boyon	RPR	UPF	21,779	46.47	27,069	58.33
Pierre Fromont	PRG	ADFP	11,300	24.11	19,340	41.67
Bernard Aulagne	FN		4,816	10.28		
Marc de Antoni	LV	EE	4,620	9.86		
Lionel Mornet	PCF		1,863	3.98		
Nicole Giret	LT-LNE		1,193	2.55		
Yves Petiot	LO		720	1.54		
Jean-François Morel	LCR		547	1.22		
Jean-Claude Lefer	IND		0	0		
Valid votes			46,865	95.00	46,409	94.35
Blank votes			2,464	5.00	2,779	5.65
Null votes						
Turnout			49,329	66.39	49,188	66.20
Abstentions			24,988	33.61	25,117	33.80
Registered voters			74,307		74,305	
Result			RPR HOLD			

=== 1988 ===
Candidate	Party	Alliance	First round		Second round	
Candidate	Party	Alliance	Votes	%	Votes	%
Jacques Boyon	RPR	URC	20,321	46.65	26,307	52.43
Dominique Saint-Pierre	MRG	PS	16,950	38.92	23,872	47.57
Bernard Aulagne	FN		3,109	7.14		
Lionel Mornet	PCF		1,977	4.54		
Régis Pujol	PNPG		1,199	2.75		
Valid votes			43,556	98.51	50,179	98.43
Blank or Null votes			659	1.49	799	1.57
Turnout			44,215	61.52	50,978	70.94
Abstentions			27,652	38.48	20,878	29.06
Registered voters			71,867		71,856	
Result			RPR HOLD			

=== 1981 ===
Candidate	Party	Alliance	First round		Second round	
Candidate	Party	Alliance	Votes	%	Votes	%
Jacques Boyon	RPR	UNM	27,953	48.38	31,878	47.95
Louis Robin	PS		23,318	40.36	34,603	52.05
Marcel Benoit	PCF		4,524	7.83		
Micheline Antonucci	PSU		1,125	1.95		
Pierre Dordain	PSD		855	1.48		
Valid votes			57,774	98.89	66,481	98.97
Blank or Null votes			651	1.11	695	1.03
Turnout			58,425	66.67	67,176	76.67
Abstentions			29,209	33.33	20,445	23.33
Registered voters			87,635		87,621	
Result			PS GAIN			

=== 1978 ===
Candidate	Party	Alliance	First round			Second round		
Candidate	Party	Alliance	Votes	%	+/–	Votes	%	+/–
Louis Robin	PS		18,769	28.54		33,304	47.71	
Jacques Boyon	RPR		17,256	26.24		36,499	52.29	
Paul Barberot	UDF	CDS	14,400	22.05		WITHDREW		
Marcel Benoit	PCF		8,679	13.20				
Marie-Rose Maupoint	PSU		2,340	3.56				
Jean-Pierre Dayet	DVD		2,211	3.36				
Cyril Vincent	LCR		1,302	1.98				
Jean-Pierre Cotton	UOPDP		706	1.07				
Valid votes			65,762	98.25		69,803	98.53	
Blank or Null votes			1,174	1.75		1,038	1.47	
Turnout			66,936	79.54	+21.85	70,841	84.03	
Abstentions			17,217	20.46		13,463	15.97	
Registered voters			84,153			84,304		
Result						RPR HOLD		

=== 1973 ===
Candidate	Party	Alliance	First round			Second round		
Candidate	Party	Alliance	Votes	%	+/–	Votes	%	+/–
Paul Barberot	CDP	URP	16,860	31.99		30,065	56.97	
Paul Morin	Rad	MR	8,532	16.19		WITHDREW		
Jacques Boyon	UDR	URP	8,493	16.11		WITHDREW		
Roland Monnett	PS	UGSD	8,071	15.31		22,711	43.03	
Marcel Benoit	PCF		7,901	14.99		WITHDREW		
Bernard Jaquinod	PSU		1,939	3.68				
Michel Chomarat	DVD		914	1.73				
Valid votes			52,710	98.21		52,776	96.99	
Blank or Null votes			960	1.79		1,638	3.01	
Turnout			53,670	73.17		54,414	74.21	
Abstentions			19,679	26.83		18,913	25.79	
Registered voters			73,349			73,327		
Result						CDP HOLD		

=== 1968 ===
Candidate	Party	Alliance	First round			Second round		
Candidate	Party	Alliance	Votes	%	+/–	Votes	%	+/–
Paul Barberot	CD	PDM	16,413	33.17		18,162	34.74	
Yvon Morandat	UDR	URP	16,042	32.42		17,245	32.99	
Louis Robin	SFIO	FGDS	9,748	19.7		16,868	32.27	
Marcel Benoit	PCF		5,463	11.04				
Henri Taponard	PSU		1,489	3.01				
Michael Mendes	Modérés		333	0.67				
Valid votes			49,488	98.97		52,275	99.43	
Blank or Null votes			514	1.03		300	0.57	
Turnout			5,002	72.02		52,575	75.76	
Abstentions			19,426	27.98		16,826	24.24	
Registered voters			69,428			69,401		
Result						CD HOLD		

=== 1967 ===
Candidate	Party	Alliance	First round			Second round		
Candidate	Party	Alliance	Votes	%	+/–	Votes	%	+/–
Paul Barberot	CD	PDM	17,892	36.64		27,449	55.63	
Louis Robin	SFIO	FGDS	12,348	25.29		21,892	44.37	
Jacques Boyon	UD-Ve		10,509	21.52		WITHDREW		
Marcel Benoit	PCF		6,607	13.53				
Pierre Bailly	Modérés		1,471	3.01				
Valid votes			48,827	98.31		49,341	97.35	
Blank or Null votes			837	1.69		1,345	2.65	
Turnout			49,664	71.77		50,686	73.26	
Abstentions			19,539	28.23		18,496	26.74	
Registered voters			69,203			69,182		
Result						CD HOLD		

=== 1962 ===
Candidate	Party	Alliance	First round			Second round		
Candidate	Party	Alliance	Votes	%	+/–	Votes	%	+/–
Paul Barberot	MRP		10,300	27.39		17,839	43.06	
Amédée Mercier	SFIO		9,987	26.56		16,513	39.86	
René Dusonchet	UNR-UDT		6,744	17.95		7,080	17.99	
Hubert Pernin	CNIP		5,402	14.37		WITHDREW		
Émile Machurat	PCF		5,169	13.75		WITHDREW		
Valid votes			37,602	97.90		41,432	98.25	
Blank or Null votes			805	2.10		740	1.76	
Turnout			38,407	56.58		42,172	62.15	
Abstentions			29,471	43.42		25,683	37.85	
Registered voters			67,878			67,855		
Result						MRP HOLD		

=== 1958 ===
Candidate	Party	Alliance	First round			Second round		
Candidate	Party	Alliance	Votes	%	+/–	Votes	%	+/–
Amédée Mercier	SFIO		12,530	29.72		13,727	29.98	
Émile Bouvard	Radsoc		8,713	20.67		13,603	29.71	
Hubert Pernin	CNIP		7,872	18.67		8,477	18.52	
Albert Jouvent	UNR		5,053	11.99		5,379	11.75	
Émile Machurat	PCF		4,708	11.17		4,598	10.04	
Roger Pioud	SFIO		3,281	7.78		WITHDREW		
Valid votes			42,157	98.05		45,784	98.83	
Blank or Null votes			844	1.96		544	1.17	
Turnout			43,001	63.62		46,328	68.58	
Abstentions			24,588	36.38		21,230	31.42	
Registered voters			67,589			67,558		
Result						SFIO GAIN		
