= 2024 French legislative election in Allier =

Following the first round of the 2024 French legislative election on 30 June 2024, runoff elections in each constituency where no candidate received a vote share greater than 50 percent were scheduled for 7 July. Candidates permitted to stand in the runoff elections needed to either come in first or second place in the first round or achieve more than 12.5 percent of the votes of the entire electorate (as opposed to 12.5 percent of the vote share due to low turnout).

== Allier ==
=== 1st constituency ===
Candidate	Party or alliance		First round		Second round	
Candidate	Party or alliance		Votes	%	Votes	%
Anne-Marie Thès	National Rally		22,816	38.61	27,780	49.39
Yannick Monnet	New Popular Front	Communist Party	17,043	28.84	28,470	50.61
Stephane Larzat	Ensemble	Renaissance	8,811	14.91		
Alexandra Bardet	The Republicans		7,889	13.35		
Jean-Marie Guillaumin	Miscellaneous right	Union of Democrats and Independents (Note: Dissident not endorsed by Ensemble)	1,303	2.20		
Jean-Marc Collot	Far-left	Lutte Ouvrière	636	1.08		
Blandine Agez	Reconquête		602	1.02		
Total			59,100	100.00	56,250	100.00
Valid votes			59,100	96.48	56,250	91.23
Invalid votes			974	1.59	1,563	2.53
Blank votes			1,185	1.93	3,845	6.24
Total votes			61,259	100.00	61,658	100.00
Registered voters/turnout			88,547	69.18	88,553	69.63

=== 2nd constituency ===
Candidate	Party or alliance		First round		Second round	
Candidate	Party or alliance		Votes	%	Votes	%
Jorys Bovet	National Rally		17,810	34.33	22,990	43.27
Louise Heritier	New Popular Front	La France Insoumise	12,482	24.06	14,618	27.51
Romain Lefebvre	The Republicans		10,204	19.67	15,526	29.22
Laurence Vanceunebrock	Ensemble	Democratic Movement	6,524	12.57		
Nicolas Rousseaux	Miscellaneous right	Independent	3,548	6.84		
Bernard Lebel	Far-left	Lutte Ouvrière	802	1.55		
Alice Gonçalves	Reconquête		511	0.98		
Total			51,881	100.00	53,134	100.00
Valid votes			51,881	95.46	53,134	96.53
Invalid votes			1,056	1.94	631	1.15
Blank votes			1,409	2.59	1,277	2.32
Total votes			54,346	100.00	55,042	100.00
Registered voters/turnout			79,877	68.04	79,874	68.91

=== 3rd constituency ===
Candidate	Party or alliance		First round		Second round	
Candidate	Party or alliance		Votes	%	Votes	%
Nicolas Ray	The Republicans		21,464	40.05	31,075	59.07
Rémy Queney	National Rally		20,270	37.82	21,528	40.93
Aline Jeudi	New Popular Front	La France Insoumise	10,935	20.40		
Jean-François Rameau	Far-left	Lutte Ouvrière	923	1.72		
Total			53,592	100.00	52,603	100.00
Valid votes			53,592	96.89	52,603	95.28
Invalid votes			709	1.28	747	1.35
Blank votes			1,011	1.83	1,858	3.37
Total votes			55,312	100.00	55,208	100.00
Registered voters/turnout			80,068	69.08	80,102	68.92
