= Ain deputies to the eighth legislature of the French Fifth Republic =

Unlike the other legislatures of the Fifth French Republic, the eighth legislature from 1986 to 1988 had proportional representation by department. This table summarises representatives from Ain in the 7th, 8th and 9th legislatures.

Constituency	7th legislature	8th legislature	9th legislature
1st	Louis Robin, PS	Jacques Boyon, RPR Charles Millon, UDF Noël Ravassard, PS Dominique Saint-Pierre, App PS	Jacques Boyon, RPR
2nd	Charles Millon, UDF	Jacques Boyon, RPR Charles Millon, UDF Noël Ravassard, PS Dominique Saint-Pierre, App PS	Lucien Guichon, RPR
3rd	Noël Ravassard, PS	Jacques Boyon, RPR Charles Millon, UDF Noël Ravassard, PS Dominique Saint-Pierre, App PS	Charles Millon, UDF
4th		Jacques Boyon, RPR Charles Millon, UDF Noël Ravassard, PS Dominique Saint-Pierre, App PS	(new constituency) Michel Voisin, CDS

== See also ==
Aisne deputies to the eighth legislature of the French fifth republic
