= André Godin =

French banker and politician

Member of the National Assembly
- In office 12 June 1997 – 18 June 2002
- Preceded by: Jacques Boyon
- Succeeded by: Jean-Michel Bertrand
- Constituency: 1st of Ain

Mayor of Bourg-en-Bresse
- In office 18 June 1995 – 25 March 2001
- Preceded by: Paul Morin
- Succeeded by: Jean-Michel Bertrand

General Councillor of Ain
- In office 14 March 1976 – 21 March 1982

Personal details
- Born: May 18, 1942 (age 84) Bourg-en-Bresse, Ain, France
- Party: Socialist Party
- Occupation: Banker

André Godin (born 18 May 1942) is a former French banker and politician from the Socialist Party. He served as the mayor of Bourg-en-Bresse from 1995 to 2001 and as a member of the National Assembly from 1997.

He was defeated in the 2001 municipal elections by Jean-Michel Bertrand (UMP) and lost his parliamentary seat in the 2002 legislative elections.

As a Member of Parliament, he was a member of the Commission for Production and Exchanges and the National Assembly Delegation for Planning. He also served on the Inquiry Commission on Superphénix and the fast neutron reactor sector (April to June 1998).
