= Allier's 2nd constituency =

Constituency of the National Assembly of France

2nd constituency of Allier
- inline Constituency of the National Assembly of France

- constituency in department

- Allier in France
- Deputy: Jorys Bovet; RN
- Department: Allier
- Cantons: Commentry, Domérat-Montluçon Nord-Ouest, Huriel, Marcillat-en-Combraille, Montluçon Est, Montluçon Nord-Est, Montluçon Ouest, Montluçon Sud

The 2nd constituency of Allier is a French legislative constituency in the Allier département.

== Members elected ==
Election	Member	Party
1958	Pierre Bourgeois	French Section of the Workers' International
1962	Jean Nègre	French Section of the Workers' International
1967	Jean Nègre	French Section of the Workers' International
1968	Henri Védrines	French Communist Party
1973	Maurice Brun	Miscellaneous left
1978	Pierre Goldberg	French Communist Party
1981	Albert Chaubard	Socialist Party
1986	Proportional representation - no election by constituency	
1988	Pierre Goldberg	French Communist Party
1993	Jean Gravier	Union for French Democracy
1997	Pierre Goldberg	French Communist Party
2002	Pierre Goldberg	French Communist Party
2007	Bernard Lesterlin	Socialist Party
2012	Bernard Lesterlin	Socialist Party
2017	Laurence Vanceunebrock-Mialon	La République En Marche!
2022	Jorys Bovet	National Rally
2024	Jorys Bovet	National Rally

== Election results ==
=== 2024 ===
Candidate	Party	Alliance	First round			Second round		
Candidate	Party	Alliance	Votes	%	+/–	Votes	%	+/–
Jorys Bovet	RN		17,810	34.33	+15.19	22,990	43.27	
Louise Heritier	LFI	NFP	12,482	24.06	+2.22	14,618	27.51	
Romain Lefebvre	LR		10,204	19.67	+8.48	15,526	29.22	
Laurence Vanceunebrock	MoDem	ENS	6,524	12.57	-4.45			
Nicolas Rousseaux	EXD		3,548	6.84	N/A			
Bernard Lebel	LO		802	1.55	+0.64			
Alice Gonçalves	REC		511	0.98	-2.92			
Valid votes			59,100	96.48	-0.46	53,134	96.53	
Blank votes			1,185	1.93	-0.13	1,277	2.32	
Null votes			974	1.59	+0.59	631	1.15	
Turnout			61,259	69.18	+18.32	55,042	68.91	
Abstentions			27,288	30.82	-18.32	24,832	31.09	
Registered voters			88,547			79,874		
Source: Ministry of the Interior, Le Monde
Result						NR HOLD		

=== 2022 ===
Legislative Election 2022: Allier's 2nd constituency
Party	Candidate	Votes	%	±%
LFI (NUPÉS)	Louise Heritier	8,719	21.84	-10.85
RN	Jorys Bovet	7,642	19.14	+9.15
LREM (Ensemble)	Laurence Vanceunebrock	6,796	17.02	−9.90
LR (UDC)	Jean-Jacques Kegelart	4,468	11.19	−11.74
DVG	Bernard Pozzoli*	4,186	10.59	N/A
DVC	Samir Triki**	3,037	7.61	N/A
REC	Axelle De Nicolay	1,556	3.90	N/A
DVE	Jean-Marie Guillaumin	1,059	2.65	+0.75
PRG	Marie-Claude Léguillon	929	2.33	N/A
Others	N/A	1,528	-	−
Turnout		39,920	50.86	+0.21
2nd round result
RN	Jorys Bovet	16,116	50.22	
LFI (NUPÉS)	Louise Heritier	15,976	49.78	
Turnout		32,092	48.04	+1.64
RN gain from LREM				

* Pozzoli ran as a dissident member of PS, without the support of the NUPES alliance.

** Triki ran as a dissident member of Horizons, without the support of the Ensemble Citoyens alliance.

=== 2017 ===
Candidate	Label	First round		Second round	
Candidate	Label	Votes	%	Votes	%
Laurence Vanceunebrock-Mialon	REM	10,827	26.11	17,396	52.05
Daniel Dugléry	LR	9,511	22.93	16,027	47.95
Sylvain Bourdier	FI	7,510	18.11		
Nicolas Brien	PS	4,725	11.39		
Élisabeth Camus	FN	4,145	9.99		
Philippe Buvat	ECO	1,325	3.19		
Jean-Marie Guillaumin	ECO	786	1.90		
Jean Demasse	DLF	707	1.70		
Philippe Chatel	DIV	495	1.19		
Gilles Roche	EXG	396	0.95		
Dominique Séguier	DVD	289	0.70		
Jean-Pierre Fournier	DVD	281	0.68		
Franck Picard	EXD	207	0.50		
Céline Dommanget	DIV	199	0.48		
Thierry Richard	DIV	70	0.17		
Votes		41,473	100.00	33,423	100.00
Valid votes		41,473	96.80	33,423	85.21
Blank votes		911	2.13	3,711	9.46
Null votes		458	1.07	2,092	5.33
Turnout		42,842	50.65	39,226	46.38
Abstentions		41,742	49.35	45,349	53.62
Registered voters		84,584		84,575	
Source: Ministry of the Interior

=== 2012 ===
Summary of the 10 June and 17 June 2012 French legislative in Allier's 1st Constituency election results
Candidate	Party		1st round		2nd round	
Candidate	Party		Votes	%	Votes	%
Bernard Lesterlin	Socialist Party	PS	18,828	36.51%	30,459	59.24%
Daniel Duglery	Union for a Popular Movement	UMP	15,980	30.99%	20,956	40.76%
Luc Bourduge	Left Front	FG	8,342	16.18%		
Pascal Courty	National Front	FN	5,181	10.05%		
Marie Couval	Europe Ecology – The Greens	EELV	1,069	2.07%		
Bernard Taillandier	Miscellaneous Right	DVD	811	1.57%		
Jean-Marie Guillaumin	Europe Ecology – The Greens	EELV	507	0.98%		
René Casilla	Far Left	ExG	390	0.76%		
Véronique Dreyfus	Far Left	ExG	336	0.65%		
Jean-Paul Moret	Far Left	ExG	121	0.23%		
Total			51,565	100%	51,415	100%
Registered voters			86,739		86,702	
Blank/Void ballots			1,075	1.24%	2,063	2.38%
Turnout			52,640	60.69%	53,478	61.68%
Abstentions			34,099	39.31%	33,224	38.32%
Result					PS hold	

=== 2007 ===
Summary of the 10 June and 17 June 2007 French legislative in Allier's 2nd Constituency election results
Candidate	Party		1st round		2nd round	
Candidate	Party		Votes	%	Votes	%
Bernard Lesterlin	Socialist Party	PS	10,481	25.46%	23,278	53.59%
Daniel Duglery	Union for a Popular Movement	UMP	16,837	40.91%	20,160	46.41%
Mireille Schurch	Communist	COM	8,091	19.66%		
Pierre-Antoine Legoutiere	Democratic Movement	MoDem	1,752	4.26%		
Agnés Falcon	National Front	FN	965	2.34%		
Claudy Aubert-Dasse	The Greens	VEC	587	1.43%		
Christian Nguyen	Far Left	EXG	516	1.25%		
Michel Albert	Hunting, Fishing, Nature, Traditions	CPNT	368	0.89%		
Véronique Dreyfus	Far Left	EXG	346	0.84%		
Michel Raynaud	Far Left	EXG	325	0.79%		
Marie-Thérèse Nicod	Movement for France	MPF	310	0.75%		
Monique Cornet	Ecologist	ECO	308	0.75%		
Jean-Paul Moret	Far Left	EXG	138	0.34%		
Vensa Lazarevic	Divers	DIV	135	0.33%		
Georges Vitti	Divers	DIV	0	0.00%		
Total			41,159	100%	44,644	100%
Registered voters			66,362		66,360	
Blank/Void ballots			951	2.26%	1,206	2.70%
Turnout			42,110	63.45%	44,644	67.28%
Abstentions			24,252	36.55%	21,716	32.72%
Result					PS GAIN	

=== 2002 ===
Legislative Election 2002: Allier's 2nd constituency
Party	Candidate	Votes	%	±%
UMP	Daniel Duglery	16,383	38.32	N/A
PCF	Pierre Goldberg	13,073	30.58	−9.23
PS	Dominique Fleurat	6,035	14.12	−2.32
FN	Lucette Vuarchex	2,070	4.84	−4.15
DVD	Jean Gravier	1,657	3.88	N/A
LV	Vincent Fabre	941	2.20	−1.22
Others	N/A	2,593		
Turnout		43,770	66.67	−1.96
2nd round result
PCF	Pierre Goldberg	21,231	50.08	−11.75
UMP	Daniel Duglery	21,167	49.92	N/A
Turnout		44,057	67.12	−4.90
PCF hold				

=== 1997 ===
Legislative Election 1997: Allier's 2nd constituency
Party	Candidate	Votes	%	±%
PCF	Pierre Goldberg	17,180	39.81	
UDF	Jean Gravier	10,766	24.94	
PS	Ginette Goux	7,096	16.44	
FN	Lucette Vuarchex	3,879	8.99	
MPF	André Gérinier	1,640	3.80	
LV	Jacques Missonnier	1,477	3.42	
DVE	Monique Guillaumin	1,121	2.60	
Turnout		45,858	68.63	
2nd round result
PCF	Pierre Goldberg	27,523	61.83	
UDF	Jean Gravier	16,994	38.17	
Turnout		48,118	72.02	
PCF gain from UDF				

=== 1993 ===
Legislative Election 1997: Allier's 2nd constituency
Party	Candidate	Votes	%	±%
UDF	Jean Gravier	15,282	34.08	+4.20
PCF	Pierre Goldberg	14,211	31.69	−5.53
PS	Bernard Pozzoli	5,586	12.46	−15.59
FN	Charles Clenihan	3,341	7.45	+2.59
GE	Jacky Flouzat	2,858	6.38	
LMR	Gerard Paquet	1,394	3.11	
The Clover - The New Ecologists	Monique Guillaumin	1,300	2.90	
Workers' Party (France, 1991–2008)	Jacques Lachaise	871	1.94	
Turnout		47,845	69.49	+1.19
2nd round result
UDF	Jean Gravier	25,438	53.03	+9.26
PCF	Pierre Goldberg	22,532	46.97	9.26
Turnout		51,290	74.49	+2.17
UDF gain from PCF				

=== 1988 ===
Candidate	Party	Alliance	First round			Second round		
Candidate	Party	Alliance	Votes	%	+/–	Votes	%	+/–
Pierre Goldberg	PCF		17,257	48.54	+1.98	26,873	56.23	
Jean Gravier	UDF	URC	13,853	29.88	+12.05	20,920	43.77	+13.76
Albert Chaubard	PS		13,005	28.05	-16.36	WITHDREW		
Charles Mac Clenihan	FN		2,254	4.86				
Valid votes			46,369	97.64	-1.04	47,793	94.87	+0.88
Blank or Null votes			1,122	2.36	+1.04	2,585	5.13	-0.88
Turnout			47,491	68.30	-6.68	50,378	72.32	-1.76
Abstentions			22,040	31.70	+6.68	19,278	27.68	+1.76
Registered voters			69,531			69,656		
Result						PCF GAIN		

=== 1981 ===
Candidate	Party	Alliance	First round			Second round		
Candidate	Party	Alliance	Votes	%	+/–	Votes	%	+/–
Albert Chaubard	PS		23,326	44.41	+26.43	34,590	69.99	
Pierre Goldberg (incumbent)	PCF		18,510	35.24	-4.01	WITHDREW		
Guy Rossi	UDF	PR	9,362	17.83		14,830	30.01	
Roger Gozard	Eco		876	1.67				
Michelle Loux	LO		445	0.85	-1.18			
Valid votes			52,519	98.68	+0.42	49,420	93.99	-3.17
Blank or Null votes			702	1.32	-0.42	3,161	6.01	+3.17
Turnout			53,221	74.98	-11.21	52,581	74.08	-13.44
Abstentions			17,762	25.02	+11.21	18,400	25.92	+13.44
Registered voters			70,983			70,981		
Result						PS GAIN		

=== 1978 ===
Candidate	Party	Alliance	First round			Second round		
Candidate	Party	Alliance	Votes	%	+/–	Votes	%	+/–
Pierre Goldberg	PCF		23,365	39.25	+3.04	32,912	55.12	+5.96
Maurice Brun	DVD		15,844	26.62	-9.96	26,801	44.88	-5.96
Albert Chaubard	PS		10,702	17.98	+3.23	WITHDREW		
Jean-Pierre Goulemot	RPR		8,405	14.12				
Michelle Loux	LO		1,208	2.03	-0.39			
Valid votes			59,524	98.26	+0.07	59,713	97.16	-0.63
Blank or Null votes			1,056	1.74	-0.08	1,746	2.84	+0.63
Turnout			60,580	86.19	+4.01	61,459	87.52	+3.25
Abstentions			9,706	13.81	-4.01	8,765	12.48	-3.25
Registered voters			70,286			70,224		
Result						PCF GAIN		

=== 1973 ===
Candidate	Party	Alliance	First round			Second round		
Candidate	Party	Alliance	Votes	%	+/–	Votes	%	+/–
Henri Védrines (incumbent)	PCF		18,885	36.21	-0.04	26,184	49.16	-1.55
Maurice Brun	DVD		17,703	33.94		27,080	50.84	
Marie-Thérèse Eyquem	PS	UGSD	7,696	14.75		WITHDREW		
André Bodeau	RI	URP	6,613	12.68	+0.47	WITHDREW		
Michelle Loux	LO		1,263	2.42				
Valid votes			52,160	98.19	-0.23	53,264	97.79	+2.65
Blank or Null votes			961	1.81	+0.23	1,204	2.21	-2.65
Turnout			53,121	82.18	-0.81	54,468	84.27	+4.93
Abstentions			11,518	17.82		10,168	15.73	
Registered voters			64,639			64,636		
Result						DVD GAIN		

=== 1968 ===
Candidate	Party	Alliance	First round			Second round		
Candidate	Party	Alliance	Votes	%	+/–	Votes	%	+/–
Henri Védrines	PCF		18,874	36.25	-1.37	24,400	50.71	
Jean Nègre (incumbent)	SFIO	FGDS	15,538	29.85	-9.70	WITHDREW		
Marc Berthon	UDR	URP	11,292	21.69		23,712	49.29	
Robert Ferrand	RI		6,358	12.21				
Valid votes			52,062	98.42	+0.88	48,112	95.14	-0.41
Blank or Null votes			837	1.58	-0.88	2,457	4.86	+0.41
Turnout			52,899	82.99	+0.92	50,569	79.34	+2.86
Abstentions			10,843	17.01	-0.92	13,165	20.66	-2.86
Registered voters			63,742			63,734		
Result						PCF GAIN		

=== 1967 ===
Candidate	Party	Alliance	First round			Second round		
Candidate	Party	Alliance	Votes	%	+/–	Votes	%	+/–
Jean Nègre (incumbent)	SFIO	FGDS	20,331	39.55	+1.26	33,432	71.24	-1.69
Henri Védrines	PCF		19,342	37.62	+2.10	WITHDREW		
Hector Rolland	UDVE		11,736	22.83		13,497	28.76	
Valid votes			51,409	97.54	-0.23	46,929	95.55	+0.99
Blank or Null votes			1,295	2.46	+0.23	2,184	4.45	-0.99
Turnout			52,704	82.07	+11.80	49,113	76.48	+9.01
Abstentions			11,514	17.93	-11.80	15,101	23.52	-9.01
Registered voters			64,218			64,214		
Result						SFIO HOLD		

=== 1962 ===
Candidate	Party	Alliance	First round			Second round		
Candidate	Party	Alliance	Votes	%	+/–	Votes	%	+/–
Jean Nègre	SFIO		16,377	38.29	+11.61	28,961	72.93	+23.80
Henri Védrines	PCF		15,193	35.52	+2.81	WITHDREW		
Marcel Soroguère	UNR-UDT		8,876	20.75		10,748	27.07	
Pierre Bourgeois (incumbent)	SFIO		2,323	5.43	-21.25	WITHDREW		
Valid votes			42,769	97.77	+0.41	39,709	94.56	-2.50
Blank or Null votes			975	2.23	-0.41	2,284	5.44	+2.50
Turnout			43,744	70.27	-4.05	41,993	67.47	-6.73
Abstentions			18,506	29.73	+4.05	20,247	32.53	+6.73
Registered voters			62,250			62,241		
Result						SFIO HOLD		

=== 1958 ===
Candidate	Party	Alliance	First round			Second round		
Candidate	Party	Alliance	Votes	%	+/–	Votes	%	+/–
Henri Védrines	PCF		14,671	32.71		17,128	38.38	
Pierre Bourgeois	SFIO		11,965	26.68		21,927	49.13	
Pierre Bargy	MRP		7,023	15.66		WITHDREW		
Paul Jourdain	Radsoc		6,536	14.57		WITHDREW		
Henri Bouchardon	CNIP		2,523	5.63		5,577	12.50	
Pierre Lauxerois	UFD		2,127	4.74				
Valid votes			44,845	97.36		44,632	97.06	
Blank or Null votes			1,216	2.64		1,352	2.94	
Turnout			46,061	74.32		45,984	74.20	
Abstentions			151,917	25.68		15,985	25.80	
Registered voters			61,978			61,969		
Result						SFIO GAIN		
