= Gérard Charasse =

French politician (1944–2023)

- Parliamentary group: RCV then SRC

Deputy for Allier's 4th constituency in the National Assembly of France
- In office 1997–2012
- Preceded by: Claude Malhuret
- Succeeded by: Constituency abolished

Deputy for Allier's 3rd constituency in the National Assembly of France
- In office 2012–2017
- Preceded by: Jean Mallot
- Succeeded by: Bénédicte Peyrol

Personal details
- Born: 26 March 1944 Le Vernet, Allier, German-occupied France
- Died: 18 June 2023 (aged 79)

Gérard Charasse (26 March 1944 – 18 June 2023) was a French politician who a member of the National Assembly of France. He represented Allier's 4th constituency (from 1997 to 2012). Then major boundary changes in 2011 reduced Allier's parliamentary entitlement from 4 constituencies down to 3 - the old 3rd constituency was in effect abolished, its name and substantially its place being taken over by the pre-2012 4th constituency. Charasse then successfully took the 3rd constituency (from 2012 to 2017). He was a member of the Radical Party of the Left; he lost his seat in the 2017 Parliamentary Elections.

- Mayor of Le Vernet (1977–2011)
- Deputy of Allier (1997–2017)
- General councillor of Allier (1998–2015)

Charasse died on 18 June 2023, at the age of 79.
