= Paul Morin =

French politician and resistance fighter (1924–2020)

Municipal Councillor for Bourg-en-Bresse
- In office 1947–1989

Mayor of Bourg-en-Bresse
- In office 1989–1995

General Councillor for the Canton of Bourg-en-Bresse II
- In office 1973–1982

General Councillor for the Canton of Bourg-en-Bresse-Nord-Centre
- In office 1982–2001

Vice-President of the General Council of Ain
- In office 1988–2001

Personal details
- Born: 29 June 1924 Bourg-en-Bresse, France
- Died: 28 July 2020 (aged 96) Bourg-en-Bresse, France
- Party: UDF

Paul Morin (29 June 1924 – 28 July 2020) was a French politician and resistance fighter.

== Biography ==
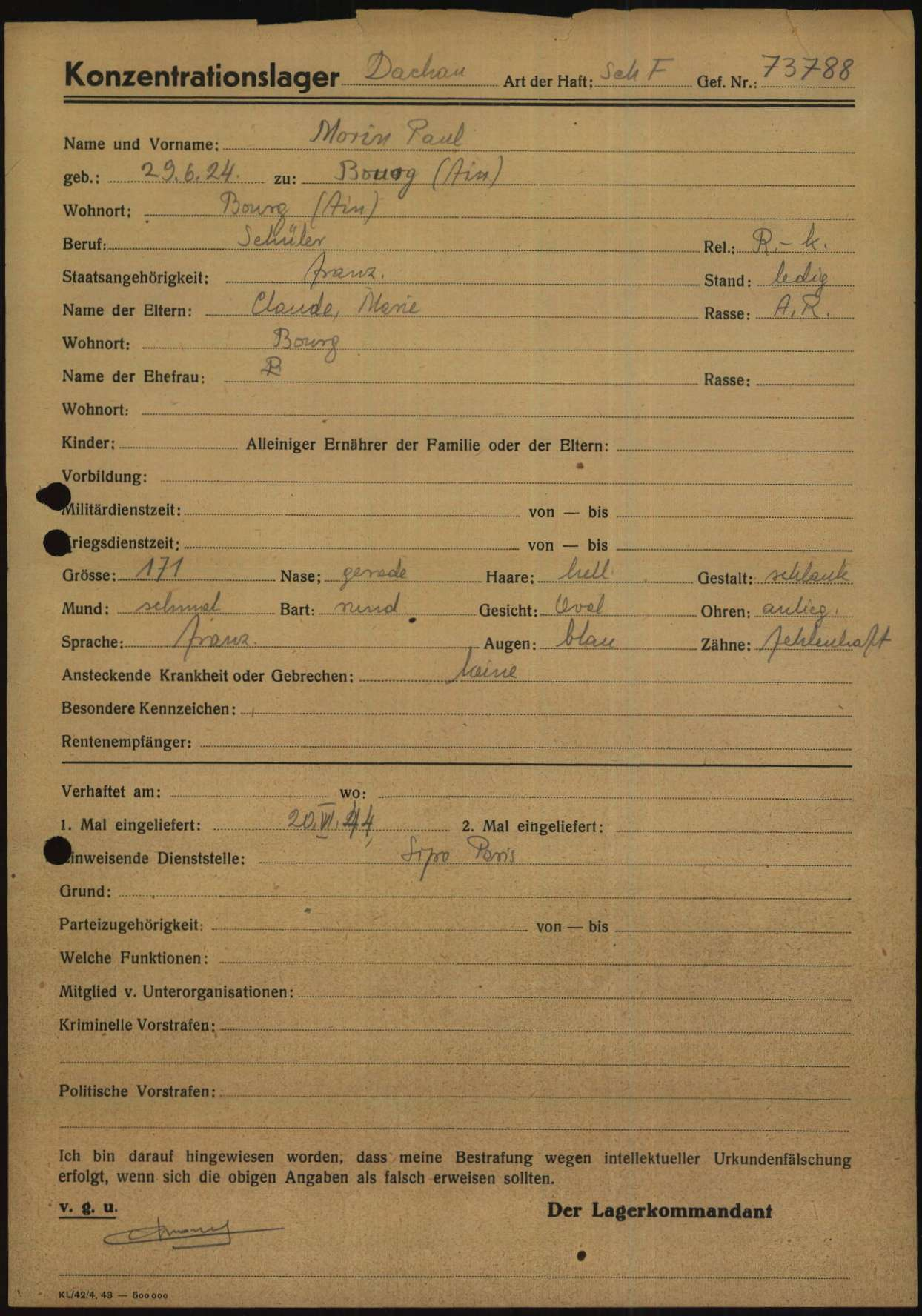
Registration form of Paul Morin as a prisoner at Dachau Nazi Concentration Camp

A student at the Lycée Lalande, Morin joined the French Resistance through the Forces unies de la jeunesse patriotique. Marcel Cochet, one of the founders of the movement, had attended secondary school alongside him. Morin was deported to the Dachau concentration camp on 18 June 1943 and returned to France in May 1945. In 2012, he published his autobiography on his survival of the Holocaust, titled J'ai eu 20 ans à Dachau.

Morin became a municipal councillor for Bourg-en-Bresse in 1947. He was a member of the Union for French Democracy (UDF). He was finally elected Mayor of Bourg-en-Bresse in 1989 after 42 years on the municipal council. He only stayed for one term, leaving the post in 1995 to become the inaugural Vice-President of the General Council of Ain, a position he held until 2001. He was also a general councillor for the Canton of Bourg-en-Bresse II and for the Canton of Bourg-en-Bresse-Nord-Centre.

Morin received the Médaille Jean-Moulin in 1993 alongside Marius Roche. He also received the Resistance Medal, the Croix de Guerre 1939–1945, and became a Commander of the Legion of Honour.

Paul Morin died in Bourg-en-Bresse on 28 July 2020 at the age of 96.

== Works ==
- Et la mer devient sel (2004)
- Le chemin du nord (2005)
- Œuvres poétiques complètes (2011)
- Le jardin de l'orme (2011)
- J'ai eu 20 ans à Dachau (2012)
