= Jean Mallot =

French politician

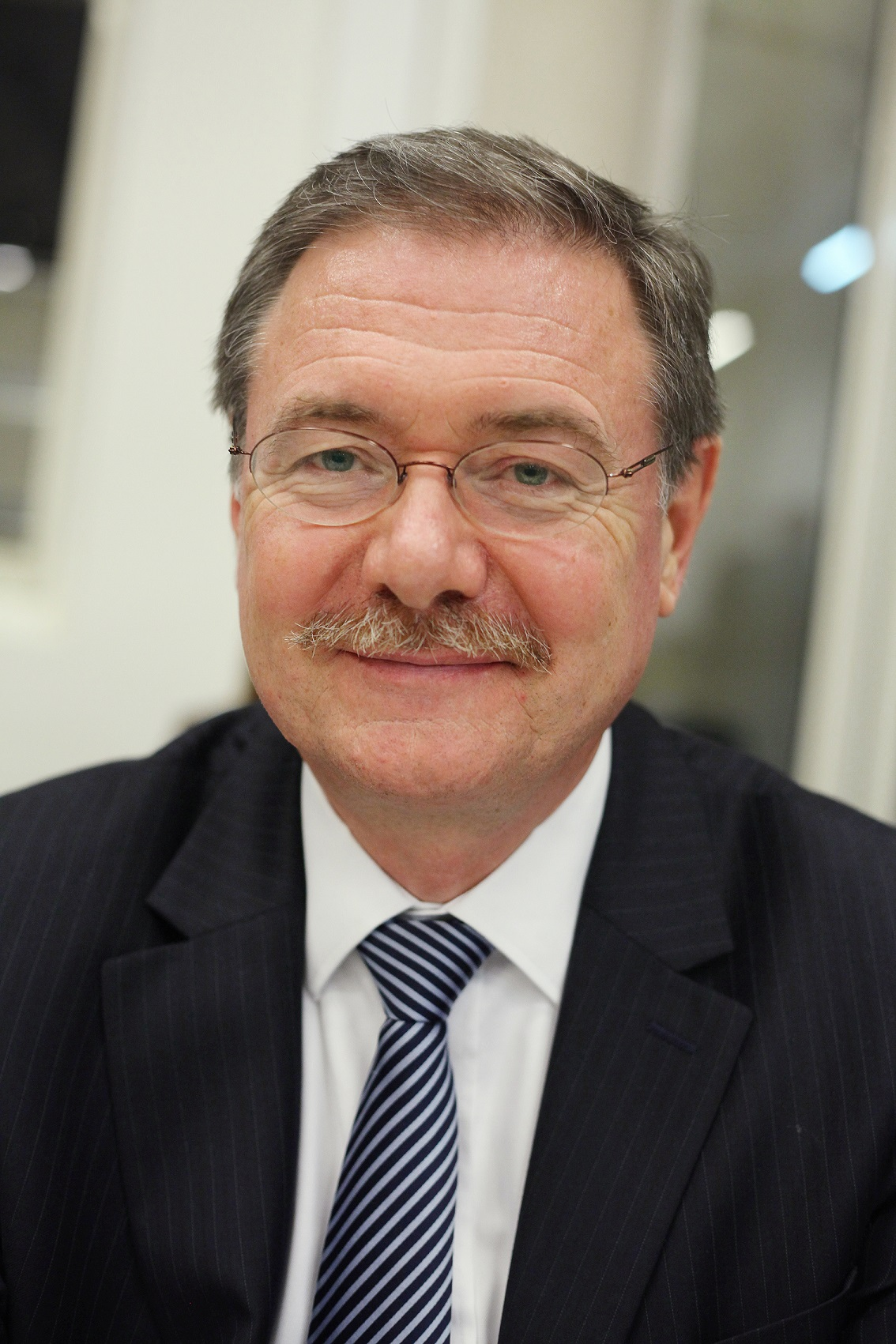
Mallot-jean

Jean Mallot (born 20 August 1952 in Nizerolles, Allier) was a member of the National Assembly of France. From the 2007 to the 2012 legislative elections, he represented the 3rd constituency of the Allier department, as a member of the Socialist Party. Major boundary changes in 2011 reduced Allier's parliamentary entitlement from 4 constituencies down to 3, and the old 3rd constituency was in effect abolished, its name and substantially its place being taken over by the pre-2012 4th constituency. Mallot chose to retire from the National Assembly at the June 2012 election.

He unsuccessfully contested Allier's 1st constituency as a miscellaneous left candidate in the 2022 French legislative election. He was eliminated in the first round coming in fifth place.
