= Bénédicte Peyrol =

French politician

Member of the French National Assembly for Allier's 3rd constituency
- In office 21 June 2017 – 21 June 2022
- Preceded by: Gérard Charasse
- Succeeded by: Nicolas Ray

Personal details
- Born: 23 March 1991 (age 34); Vichy, France
- Political party: REM
- Education: Panthéon-Assas University
- Profession: Jurist

Bénédicte Peyrol (born 23 March 1991) is a French lawyer and politician of La République En Marche! (LREM) who was a member of the French National Assembly from 2017 to 2022, representing Allier.

== Early life and career ==
Born in Vichy, Peyrol grew up in Cusset. Her mother was a nursery nurse at the Vichy hospital and now takes care of the nursery of the hospital, her father is an insurer in Cusset, her grandparents were delicatessens in Varennes. She attended St. Joseph's High School and Saint-Pierre High School in Cusset, where she obtained a baccalauréat with honors. Peyrol then joined the Faculty of Law and Political Science at University of Auvergne where she did her first year of law. She completed her public law degree at the Panthéon-Assas University where she then obtained a master's degree in business law. Since 2014, she graduated from the Master 2 International Taxation, jointly awarded by HEC Paris and Panthéon-Assas University.

In August 2014, Peyrol joined the Dassault Systèmes group as a tax specialist. In October 2015, she became a jurist. She is in charge of a European public affairs mission within a private company in recycling. As she was committed to, she resigned on 20 June 2017 to devote herself fully to her mandate as a Member of Parliament. She resigned on 20 June 2017 to devote herself fully to her mandate as a Member of Parliament

== Political career ==
In 2016, Peyrol founded a local committee En Marche! in Cusset. For the party's youth organization, "Jeunes with Macron", she served as local representative in the Allier constituency.

=== Member of the National Assembly ===
Peyrol was elected to the French National Assembly on 18 June 2017, representing the 3rd constituency of Allier.

In the National Assembly, Peyrol served on the Finance, General Economy and Budgetary Monitoring Committee. She is a member of the Delegation of the National Assembly to women's rights and equal opportunities between men and women and a member of the joint information mission on the procedures for prosecuting tax offenses. In this capacity, she co-authored (with Jean-Noël Barrot) draft legislation in 2018 to combat large-scale tax evasion and avoidance schemes through dividend stripping in the wake of the CumEx Files revelations.

She was defeated in the second round of the 2022 French legislative election by Nicolas Ray of the Republicans.

== See also ==
- 2017 French legislative election
