= Xavier Breton =

French politician (born 1962)

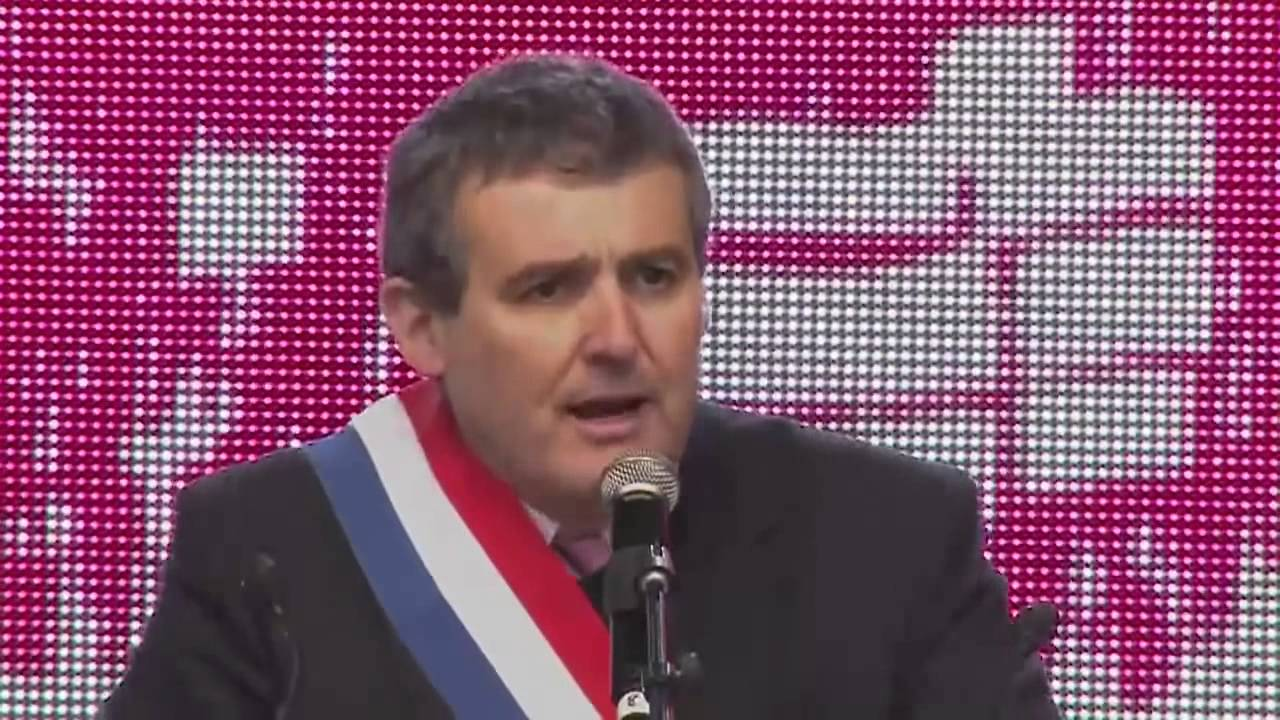
- Breton in 2013

Member of the National Assembly for Ain's 1st constituency
- Incumbent
- Assumed office 20 June 2007
- Preceded by: Jean-Michel Bertrand

Regional councillor of Auvergne-Rhône-Alpes
- Incumbent
- Assumed office 4 January 2016
- President: Laurent Wauquiez

Vice president of the agglomeration community of Bourg-en-Bresse
- In office 1 January 2002 – 16 March 2008
- President: Michel Buellet

1st deputy mayor of Bourg-en-Bresse
- In office 19 March 2001 – 16 March 2008

Personal details
- Born: 25 November 1962 (age 63) Darney, Vosges, France
- Party: LR (2015–present)
- Other political affiliations: UMP (before 2015)
- Education: Sciences Po
- Profession: Territorial executive
- Website: www.xavierbreton.fr

Xavier Breton (born 25 November 1962) is a French politician of The Republicans (LR) who has been deputy for Ain's 1st constituency from 2007 to 2024 and regional councillor of Auvergne-Rhône-Alpes since 2016.

In the Republicans' 2016 presidential primaries, Breton endorsed François Fillon as the party's candidate for the office of President of France. Ahead of the 2022 presidential elections, he publicly declared his support for Michel Barnier as the Republicans' candidate. He was re-elected at the 2022 French legislative election.
