= Laurence Vanceunebrock-Mialon =

French politician

Laurence Vanceunebrock
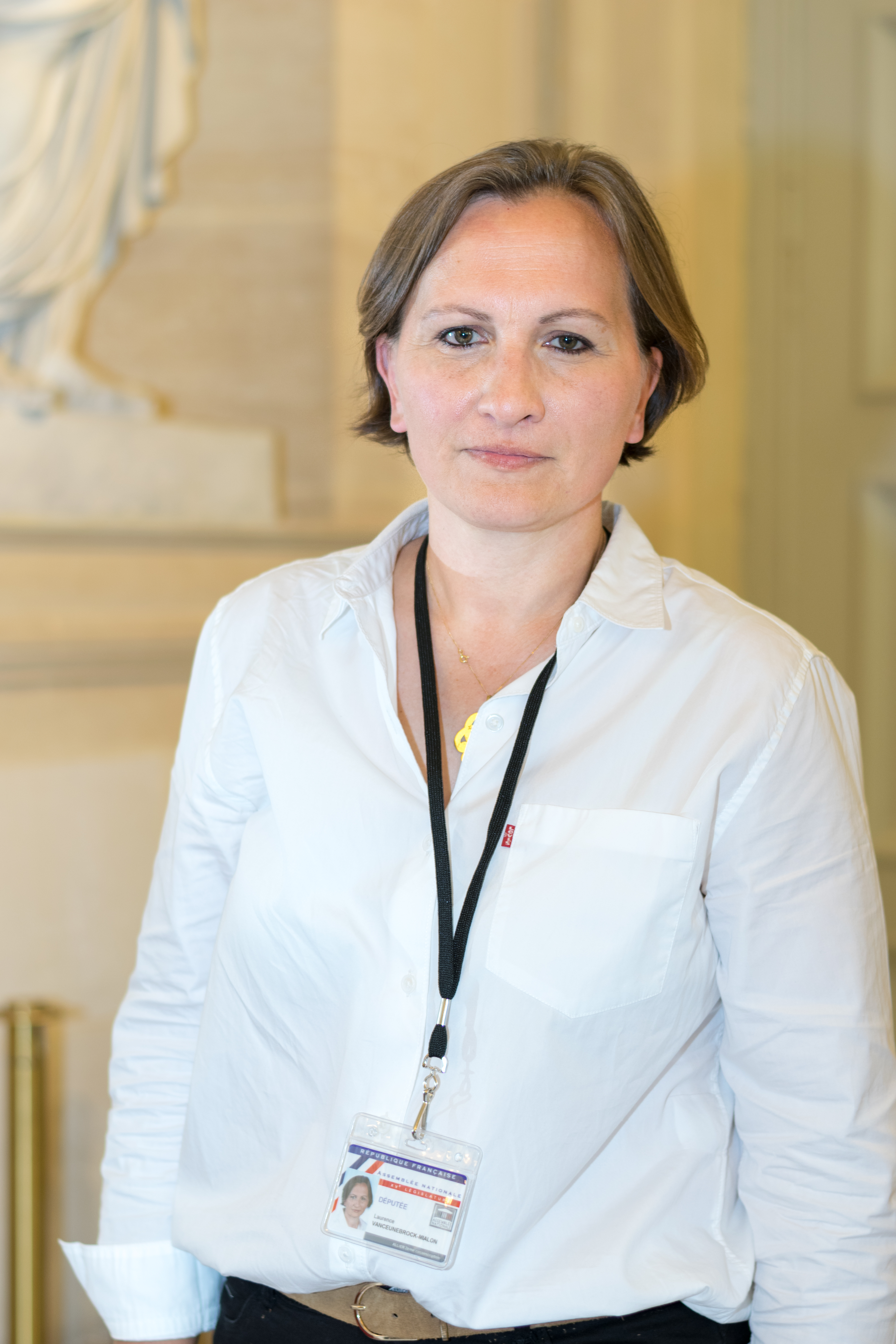
- Vanceunebrock in 2017

Member of the French National Assembly for Allier's 2nd constituency
- In office 21 June 2017 – 21 June 2022
- Preceded by: Bernard Lesterlin
- Succeeded by: Jorys Bovet

Personal details
- Born: 6 May 1970 (age 55) Avion, France
- Party: Democratic Movement (2023–present)
- Other political affiliations: Renaissance (2017–2023)
- Profession: Police officer

Laurence Vanceunebrock is a French politician of Democratic Movement (MoDem) who served as a member of the French National Assembly from 2017 to 2022, representing Allier's 2nd constituency, and a former police officer.

== Political career ==
In parliament, Vanceunebrock served as member of the Committee on Social Affairs. From 2021, she was the parliament’s rapporteur on legislation to ban so-called conversion therapies that attempt to change an individual's sexual orientation.

In addition to her committee assignments, Vanceunebrock chaired the French-Danish Parliamentary Friendship Group.

Vanceunebrock lost her seat in the first round of the 2022 French legislative election.

In September 2023, she left Renaissance and joined the Democratic Movement.

== Political positions ==
In 2018, Vanceunebrock joined other co-signatories around Sébastien Nadot in officially filing a request for a commission of inquiry into the legality of French weapons sales to the Saudi-led coalition fighting in Yemen, days before an official visit of Saudi Crown Prince Mohammed bin Salman to Paris.

In 2020, Vanceunebrock went against her parliamentary group's majority and abstained from an important vote on a much discussed security bill drafted by her colleagues Alice Thourot and Jean-Michel Fauvergue that helps, among other measures, curtail the filming of police forces.

== Personal life ==
Vanceunebrock has two daughters.
