= Daniel Dugléry =

French politician (born 1946)

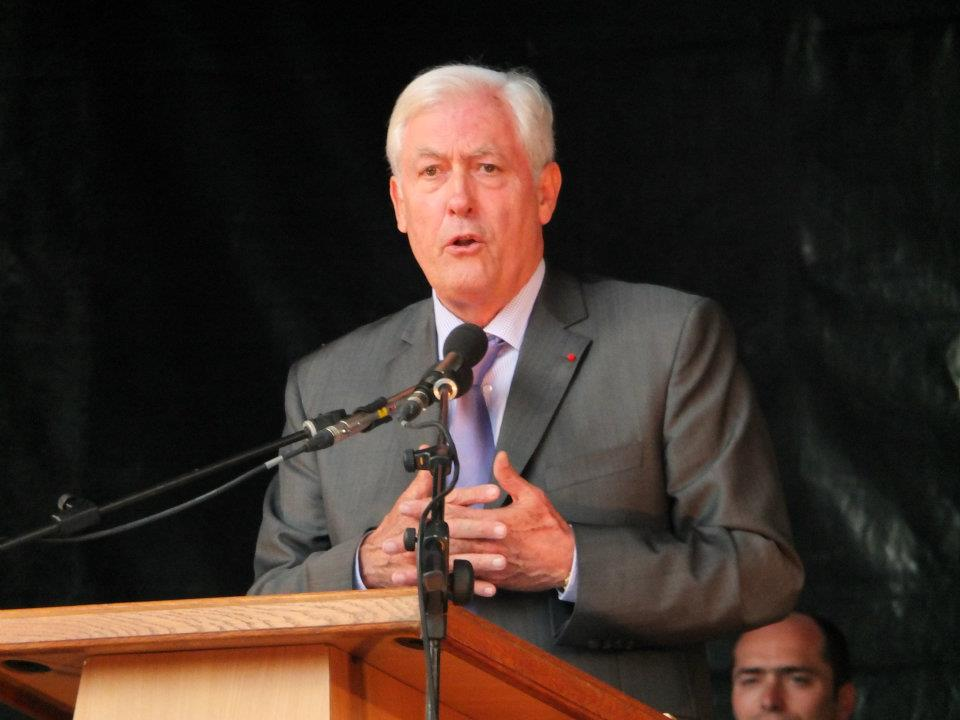
Daniel Dugléry in Montluçon, France

Daniel Dugléry, born 30 October 1946 in Montluçon (Allier) is a French politician, member of the center-right UMP party.

== Education ==
Son of a baker, he got into the National Police as a peacekeeper. Holder of a Baccalauréat (French equivalent of A-levels) in philosophy, he took a Peace Officer entrance exam, before taking the Superintendent entrance exam. He studied in the Saint-Joseph private school.

== Career ==
Daniel Dugléry did an internship as commissioner in Clermont-Ferrand; after, he was reword in Beaumont-sur-Oise (1977–1979), and Creil (1979–1982). From 1986 to 1988, he was a member of the Executive Board of the National Crime Prevention Council, and from 1989 to 1994, he was Deputy Executive Director of Prevention and Protection in the Ministry of Interior. In 1997, he left public administration for the private sector and became Director-General of a Parisian business.

== Political activities ==
At the end of 2000, Daniel Dugléry won the local elections of Montluçon a second time. Proclaiming himself “non-political”, he led a list of different right parties during the 2001 local elections: he won against the left wing with more than 57% of the votes cast. The following week, he was elected as general Councilor of Allier, and became vice-president of the Regional Council. During his first term, Daniel Dugléry, renovated Marx Dormoy avenue adding fountains, he built an aquatic center and renovated the entire sporting infrastructure. He also refurbished the République Avenue and renovated the Saint-Paul church. His work has made Montluçon more attractive; however, it is different for its economic and social balance sheet. The National Housing Federation maintains tense relationship with Daniel Dugléry. He was re-elected Mayor of Montluçon from the first session, the 9th of March 2008, with 50,18% of votes. Daniel Dugléry almost lost to Pierre Goldberg (50,08%) at 2002 legislative elections. And, in 2007, his defeat was bigger against Bernard Lesterlin. (53,59%). In 2008, he was sensed to be a candidate in senatorial elections, but he withdrew. In 2010, he was on the top of the list of the presidential majority in the department of Allier during the regional election. After this ballot, he became the UMP party president at the Auvergne Regional Council. In 2012, he stood as candidate of UMP party at legislative elections in the second largest riding of Allier against the Social outgoing MP (Member of Parliament) Bernard Lesterlin, however, he failed a second time. Daniel Dugléry supported François Fillon’s candidacy for the UMP presidency during the 2012 Fall Conference.
