= Pierre Villon =

French politician (1901–1980)

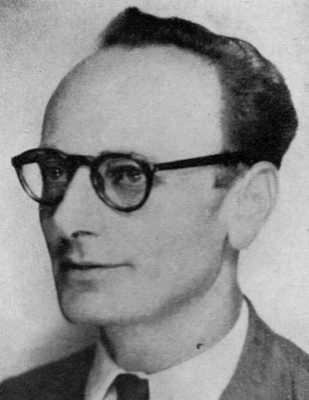
Pierre Villon in 1946

Pierre Villon (27 August 1901 in Soultz-Haut-Rhin, Alsace-Lorraine – 6 November 1980 in Vallauris, Alpes-Maritimes) was a member of the French Communist Party and of the French Resistance during World War II. With his true name of Roger Salomon Ginsburger, he was an architect. In spring 1944, with Maurice Kriegel-Valrimont and Jean de Voguë, he was one of the three leaders of the Committee of Military action created by the Conseil National de la Résistance (CNR).

Delegated to the Provisional Consultative Assembly, he was then appointed to the two national constituent assemblies as a member of the French Communist Party, then to the French National Assembly from 1946. He was constantly re-elected in Allier until 1978 (except during the 1962 - 1967 term when his seat was occupied by the socialist Charles Magne, mayor of Gannat). He was also an active member of the Peace Movement.

He was the husband of Marie-Claude Vaillant-Couturier.
