= Jorys Bovet =

French politician (born 1993)

Member of the National Assembly for Allier's 2nd constituency
- Incumbent
- Assumed office 22 June 2022
- Preceded by: Laurence Vanceunebrock-Mialon

Personal details
- Born: 30 March 1993 (age 33) Saint-Martin-d'Hères, France
- Party: National Rally

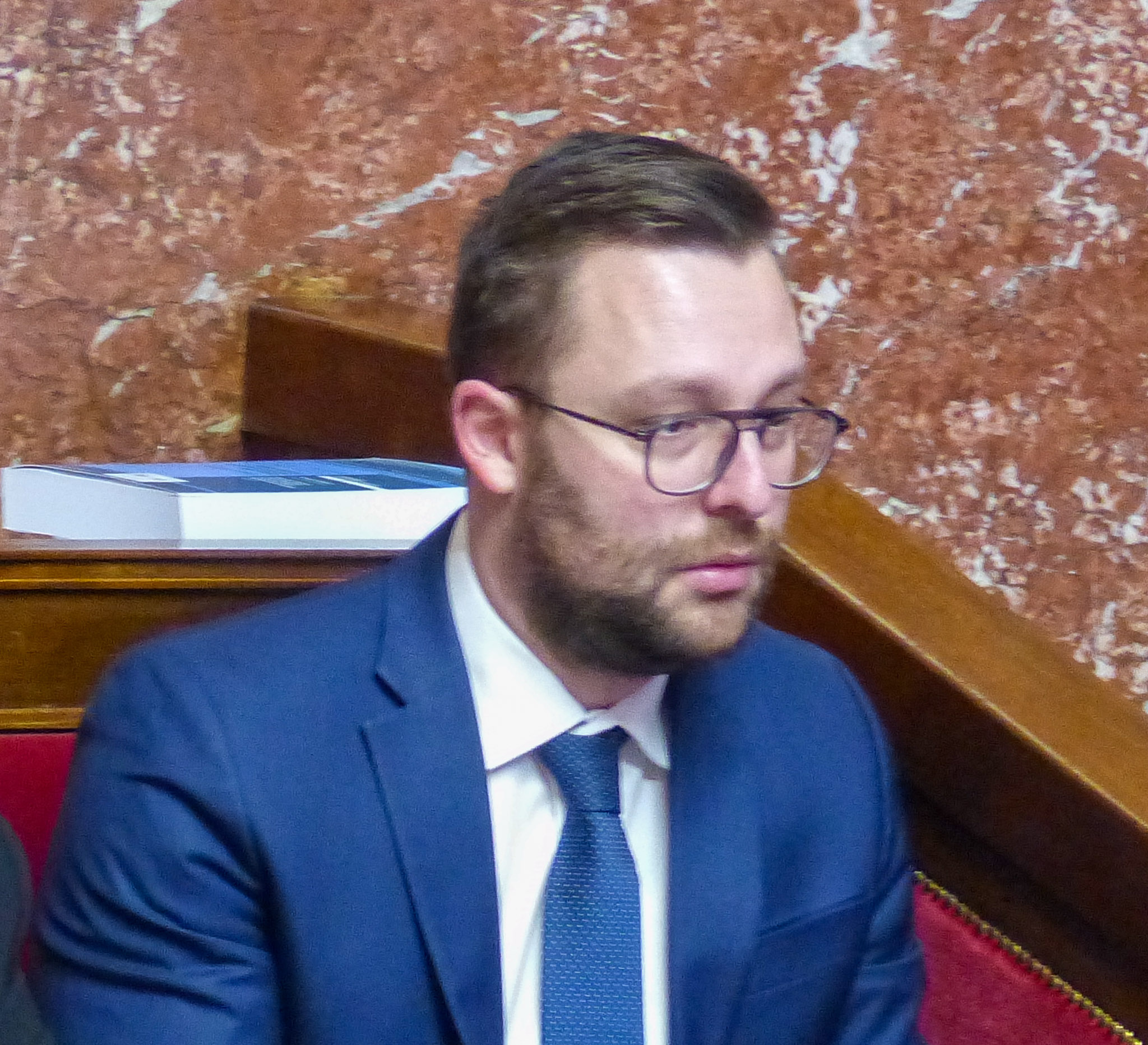
Jorys Bovet (2026)

Jorys Bovet (born 30 March 1993) is a French politician from the National Rally who was elected member of the National Assembly for Allier's 2nd constituency in the 2022 French legislative election.

== Biography ==
Jorys Bovet works as a delivery driver. He is the first representative of this profession to sit in the National Assembly. He lives in the Vichy basin and claims to have "family ties" in Montluçon.

He joined the National Rally in 2021. He was elected deputy on June 19, 2022, in the second district of Allier with 50.22% of the vote.

He ran again in the 2024 legislative elections, with Jérôme Duchalet, mayor of the commune of Vaux, Allier, as his running mate. He was re-elected by a large margin on July 7, 2024, with 43.27% of the vote, against Romain Lefebvre (LR) and Louise Héritier (NFP).
