= Maurice Brun =

French politician (1925–2021)

Maurice Brun (France, 2 July 1925 – 5 August 2021) was a French politician. He served as mayor of Montluçon from 1972 to 1977 and as a Deputy from 1973 to 1978.
