= Canton of Bourg-en-Bresse-Nord-Centre =

Coordinates: 46°12′20″N 5°13′44″E

Bourg-en-Bresse-Nord-Centre
- Former canton
- Interactive map of Bourg-en-Bresse-Nord-Centre
- Country: France
- Region: Auvergne-Rhône-Alpes
- Department: Ain
- No. of communes: {{{nbcomm}}}
- Disbanded: 2015
- Population (2012): 12,593

The canton of Bourg-en-Bresse-Nord-Centre is a former administrative division in eastern France. It comprised part of the commune of Bourg-en-Bresse. It was disbanded following the French canton reorganisation which came into effect in March 2015. It had 12,593 inhabitants (2012).

== Demographics ==
Historical population
Year	Pop.	±%
1990	13,408	—
1999	12,617	−5.9%
2012	12,593	−0.2%

== See also ==
- Cantons of the Ain department
- Communes of France
