= Pierre Goldberg =

French politician (born 1938)

Member of the National Assembly
- In office June 12, 1997 – March 16, 2007
- Preceded by: Jean Gravier
- Succeeded by: Bernard Lesterlin
- Constituency: 2nd of Allier
- In office June 23, 1988 – April 1, 1993
- Preceded by: Proportional by department
- Succeeded by: Jean Gravier
- Constituency: 2nd of Allier
- In office April 3, 1978 – May 22, 1981
- Preceded by: Maurice Brun
- Succeeded by: Albert Chaubard
- Constituency: 2nd of Allier

Mayor of Montluçon
- In office March 13, 1977 – April 18, 1998
- Preceded by: Maurice Brun
- Succeeded by: Jean-Claude Micouraud

Personal details
- Born: August 25, 1938 Chouvigny, Allier, France
- Party: PCF (1961–2010); The Federation (since 2010)

Pierre Goldberg (born 25 August 1938) is a French politician. Elected as a deputy in 1978, 1988, and 1997, he was re-elected on 16 June 2002, after the 2001 municipal elections won by Daniel Dugléry (UMP), for the legislature 2002–2007, representing the second constituency of Allier. He remained in office until his resignation on 16 March 2007, and was a member of the Communist group. He was among the few representatives of the working class in the National Assembly.

== Biography ==
Born to a postal worker, Pierre Goldberg began his professional career after his primary studies in Saint-Sornin, working as a farm laborer until the age of twenty. He was the second of three children (René, Pierre, and Marinette) whose parents were from public assistance.

He became involved in activism during the Algerian War. He came into contact with the Union of Republican Youth of France just before the organization took on the name of Young Communist Movement of France. In 1956, he participated in a national congress, where the conclusion of the proceedings was greeted by a veteran of French communism, Marcel Cachin.

After twenty-eight months of military service, he joined the PTT (Postal, Telegraph, and Telephone Services) as an auxiliary in Montluçon, following in his father's footsteps. Between 1961 and 1977, he progressed within the postal administration, becoming a telecommunications sector leader and a manager. Joining the French Communist Party in 1961, he engaged in activism within the PTT's General Confederation of Labour (CGT), simultaneously pursuing union work at the PTT and political beginnings within the PCF federation of Allier, where he served on the board from 1964 onwards.

Entering the Montluçon city council in 1972 with his friend Roger Loury, he was elected to the new Montluçon-West canton in the Allier General Council in 1973, becoming its First Vice President in 1976, and a regional councilor for Auvergne in 1977. In the same year, he was elected mayor of Montluçon and the following year, a deputy for Allier, and was chosen as secretary of the National Assembly.

In the 1981 legislative elections, he was defeated by the Socialist Albert Chaubard, causing a crisis within the municipal majority between communists and socialists. The socialists presented an independent list in the 1983 municipal elections, but the leadership of the municipality remained unchanged.

In November 1991, the former PTT unionist hosted the 28th Congress of the National Federation of PTT-CGT in Montluçon.

In 1998, he resigned as mayor in favor of his friend and first deputy, Jean-Claude Micouraud. This decision was strongly criticized by his left-wing detractors, rightly or wrongly; the fact is that in 2001, the left-wing union list led by Jean-Claude Micouraud was heavily defeated following a very violent campaign by the right-wing list of Daniel Dugléry.

Convicted with Jean-Claude Micouraud and Denis Planchet, to one year of ineligibility, six months of imprisonment, and the payment of €800,900 in damages to the city of Montluçon for seven fictitious jobs (three municipal employees working at the headquarters of the local section of the Communist Party and four at the local radio station Radio Montluçon Bourbonnais), Pierre Goldberg resigned from his parliamentary mandate on 16 March 2007. Then, reinstated in his civil rights, he led a communist and various left-wing list in Montluçon in March 2008, but came in third behind the outgoing UMP mayor Daniel Dugléry and the list of Socialist deputy Bernard Lesterlin.

His administration was responsible for several Montluçon infrastructures, such as Athanor, the Boris Vian space and its Ilets park, the installation of a National Dramatic Center, "Les Fédérés", the development of the Saint-Jacques district, the Boulevard de Courtais, the upper town (laying of cobblestones, pedestrian streets); in 1983, he obtained the installation of an MRI at the hospital.

He was also the initiator of an active social and cultural policy.

In June 2010, after fifty years of activism, he left the PCF and joined the FASE.

== Offices ==
- 13 March 1977 – 6 March 1983: 05or of Montluçon (Allier)
- 1977–1986: Member of the Auvergne Regional Council
- 1973–1979: Member of the Allier General Council
- 1976–1979: First Vice President of the Allier General Council
- 3 April 1978 – 22 May 1981: Member of the National Assembly
- 22 March 1982 – 27 June 1988: Member of the Allier General Council
- 14 March 1983 – 12 March 1989: Mayor of Montluçon (Allier)
- 17 March 1986 – 27 June 1988: Member of the Auvergne Regional Council
- 13 June 1988 – 1 April 1993: Member of the National Assembly
- 24 March 1989 – 18 June 1995: Mayor of Montluçon (Allier)
- 25 June 1995 – 27 March 1998: Mayor of Montluçon (Allier)
- 1 June 1997 – 18 June 2002: Member of the National Assembly
- 28 March 1998 – 18 March 2001: Member of the Montluçon Municipal Council (Allier)
- 16 March 1998 – 28 March 2004: Member of the Auvergne Regional Council
- 1998: Member of the Allier General Council
- 9 March 2008 – 11 March 2008: Member of the Montluçon Municipal Council (resigned)

== Sources ==
- Pierre Goldberg ou la passion de la terre, article by journalist Claude James, published in L'Humanité, in April 1984.
- Biographical note, Who's Who in France, 2008
