= André Lajoinie =

French politician (1929–2024)

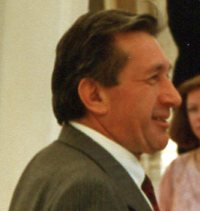
- André Lajoinie in 1990

Member of the National Assembly for Allier's 3rd constituency
- In office 12 June 1997 – 18 June 2002
- Preceded by: Bernard Coulon
- Succeeded by: Yves Simon

Personal details
- Born: 26 December 1929 Chasteaux, Corrèze, France
- Died: 26 November 2024 (aged 94) Paris, France
- Party: French Communist Party
- Profession: Farmer

André Lajoinie (26 December 1929 – 26 November 2024) was a French politician and a member of the French Communist Party (PCF).

== Life and career ==
Lajoinie was a member of the French National Assembly for Allier from 1978 to 1993, then from 1997 to 2002, and was president of the Communist caucus in the Assembly from 1981 to 1993. He was the deputy for Allier's 3rd constituency in the 6th, 7th, 9th and 11th legislatures, and one of four deputies from Allier in the 8th legislature.

André Lajoinie in 1988

A close collaborator of party leader Georges Marchais, he was chosen to be the PCF's candidate in the 1988 presidential election. A rather mediocre public speaker, Lajoinie proved to be an uncharismatic candidate, and was lampooned by humorists who caricatured him as a dimwit. His voting share of 6.8% was considered an unusually mediocre result for PCF standards. Lajoinie retired from active politics in 2002.

Lajoinie died on 26 November 2024 in Paris at the age of 94.

== Honours and awards ==
- Chevalier of the Order of Legion of Honour
