= Allier's 3rd constituency =

Constituency of the National Assembly of France

3rd constituency of Allier
- inline Constituency of the National Assembly of France

- constituency in department

- Allier in France
- Deputy: Nicolas Ray; LR
- Department: Allier
- Cantons: Cusset-Nord, Cusset-Sud, Le Donjon, Escurolles, Gannat, Jaligny-sur-Besbre, Lapalisse, Le Mayet-de-Montagne, Vichy-Nord, Vichy-Sud
- Registered voters: 106,126

The 3rd constituency of Allier is a French legislative constituency in the Allier département.

== Members elected ==
Election	Member	Party
1958	Pierre Villon	French Communist Party
1962	Charles Magne	French Section of the Workers' International
1967	Pierre Villon	French Communist Party
1968	Pierre Villon	French Communist Party
1973	Pierre Villon	French Communist Party
1978	André Lajoinie	French Communist Party
1981	André Lajoinie	French Communist Party
1986	Proportional representation - no election by constituency	
1988	André Lajoinie	French Communist Party
1993	Bernard Coulon	Union for French Democracy
1997	André Lajoinie	French Communist Party
2002	Yves Simon	Union for a Popular Movement
2007	Jean Mallot	Socialist Party
2012	Gérard Charasse	Radical Party of the Left
2017	Bénédicte Peyrol	La République En Marche!
2022	Nicolas Ray	The Republicans
2024	Nicolas Ray	The Republicans

== Election results ==
=== 2024 ===
Candidate	Party	Alliance	First round			Second round		
Candidate	Party	Alliance	Votes	%	+/–	Votes	%	+/–
Nicolas Ray (incumbent)	LR		21,464	40.05	+15.83	31,075	59.07	
Rémy Queney	RN		20,270	37.82	+17.51	21,528	40.93	
Aline Jeudi	PS	NFP	10,935	20.40	+0.87	WITHDREW		
Jean-François Rameau	LO		923	1.72	+0.50			
Valid votes			53,592	96.89	-0.63	52,603	95.28	
Blank votes			1,011	1.83	+0.15	1,883	3.41	
Null votes			709	1.28	+0.48	722	1.31	
Turnout			55,312	69.08	+18.43	55,208	68.92	
Abstentions			24,756	30.92	-18.43	24,894	31.08	
Registered voters			80,068			80,102		
Source: Ministry of the Interior, Le Monde
Result						LR HOLD		

=== 2022 ===
Legislative Election 2022: Allier's 3rd constituency
Party	Candidate	Votes	%	±%
LR (UDC)	Nicolas Ray	9,594	24.22	+4.45
LREM (Ensemble)	Bénédicte Peyrol	9,219	23.27	-11.17
RN	Quentin Julien	8,047	20.31	+7.04
PS (NUPÉS)	Elsa Denfred	7,737	19.53	+6.09
PRG	Isabelle Réchard	1,655	4.18	−9.85
REC	Sophie Lacour	1,580	3.99	N/A
Others	N/A	1,781	-	−
Turnout		39,613	50.65	−0.35
2nd round result
LR (UDC)	Nicolas Ray	19,296	60.98	+19.41
LREM (Ensemble)	Bénédicte Peyrol	12,347	39.02	−19.41
Turnout		31,643	44.74	−0.74
LR gain from LREM		Swing	+19.41	

=== 2017 ===
Candidate	Label	First round		Second round	
Candidate	Label	Votes	%	Votes	%
Bénédicte Peyrol	REM	13,562	34.44	18,480	58.43
Gabriel Maquin	LR	7,784	19.77	13,145	41.57
Jacques de Chabannes	PRG	5,526	14.03		
Jean-Pierre Sigaud	FN	5,226	13.27		
Marie-Thérèse Dupuis	FI	3,311	8.41		
Pascal Devos	ECO	1,982	5.03		
Marie-Laure Becouze	DLF	909	2.31		
Bernard Lebel	EXG	391	0.99		
Annie Demmel	DIV	304	0.77		
Ahmed Ghlamallah	DIV	202	0.51		
Guillaume de Longeville	EXD	176	0.45		
Votes		39,373	100.00	31,625	100.00
Valid votes		39,373	97.51	31,625	87.84
Blank votes		714	1.77	2,927	8.13
Null votes		293	0.73	1,450	4.03
Turnout		40,380	51.00	36,002	45.48
Abstentions		38,797	49.00	43,153	54.52
Registered voters		79,177		79,155	
				REM Gain from PRG	
Source: Ministry of the Interior

=== 2012 ===
Summary of the 10 June and 17 June 2012 French legislative in Allier's 3rd Constituency election results
Candidate	Party		1st round		2nd round	
Candidate	Party		Votes	%	Votes	%
Gérard Charasse	Radical Party of the Left	PRG	19,996	42.51%	26,301	57.37%
Claude Malhuret	Union for a Popular Movement	UMP	15,232	32.38%	19,546	42.63%
Claudine Lopez	National Front	FN	6,415	13.64%		
Pascale Semet	Left Front	FG	2,650	5.63%		
Anne Babian-Lhermet	The Greens	VEC	903	1.92%		
Sylvie Rasile	Democratic Movement	MoDem	593	1.26%		
Pascal Javerliat	Radical Party	PRV	325	0.69%		
Patrice Rucar	Ecologist	ECO	307	0.65%		
Jean-Marc Caecassin	New Centre-Presidential Majority	NCE	273	0.58%		
Monique Roche	Far Left	EXG	207	0.44%		
Renaud Siry	Ecologist	ECO	142	0.30%		
Total			47,043	100%	45,847	100%
Registered voters			79,029		78,992	
Blank/Void ballots			784	1.64%	1,542	3.25%
Turnout			47,827	60.52%	47,389	59.99%
Abstentions			31,202	39.48%	31,603	40.01%
Result					RDG GAIN	

=== 2007 ===
Summary of the 10 June and 17 June 2007 French legislative in Allier's 3rd Constituency election results
Candidate	Party		1st round		2nd round	
Candidate	Party		Votes	%	Votes	%
Jean Mallot	Socialist Party	PS	10,568	23.41%	23,560	50.80%
Yves Simon	Union for a Popular Movement	UMP	18,000	39.87%	22,822	49.20%
Dominique Bidet	Communist	COM	8,299	18.38%		
Claude Joly	Democratic Movement	MoDem	2,548	5.64%		
Jean-Louis Baudriller	National Front	FN	1,677	3.71%		
Marc Boyer	Movement for France	MPF	1,162	2.57%		
Anne-Marie Chambeau	The Greens	VEC	719	1.59%		
Françoise Gaillardon	Far Left	EXG	659	1.46%		
Bernard Lebel	Far Left	EXG	482	1.07%		
Gérard-Pierre Guillaumin	Ecologist	ECO	433	0.96%		
Véronique Deris-Targon	Ecologist	ECO	330	0.73%		
Mireille Marnay	Divers	DIV	272	0.60%		
Charles Castanier	Divers	DIV	0	0.00%		
Total			45,149	100%	46,382	100%
Registered voters			70,737		70,733	
Blank/Void ballots			1,244	2.68%	1,657	3.45%
Turnout			46,393	65.59%	48,039	67.92%
Abstentions			24,344	34.41%	22,694	32.08%
Result					PS GAIN	

=== 2002 ===
Legislative Election 2002: Allier's 3rd constituency
Party	Candidate	Votes	%	±%
UMP	Yves Simon	17,025	36.73	
PCF	Jean-Claude Mairal	10,614	22.90	
PS	Jean Mallot	9,058	19.54	
FN	Jean-Louis Baudriller	3,403	7.34	
LV	Nicole Rouaire	1,423	3.07	
MPF	Arnaud de Veauce	1,239	2.67	
CPNT	Olivier Bourrel	1,122	2.42	
Others	N/A	2,470		
Turnout		47,750	68.07	
2nd round result
UMP	Yves Simon	23,202	50.72	
PCF	Jean-Claude Mairal	22,546	49.28	
Turnout		47,627	67.90	
UMP gain from PCF				

=== 1997 ===
Legislative Election 1997: Allier's 3rd constituency
Party	Candidate	Votes	%	±%
PCF	André Lajoinie	15,882	32.58	
UDF	Bernard Coulon	15,599	32.00	
PS	Jean Mallot	7,804	16.01	
FN	Alain Compagnon	4,559	9.35	
LV	Danièle Moury	2,135	4.38	
MPF	François de Vaulx	1,637	3.36	
GE	Jacques Bernard	1,136	2.33	
Turnout		51,494	73.43	
2nd round result
PCF	André Lajoinie	28,308	54.37	
UDF	Bernard Coulon	23,758	45.63	
Turnout		55,012	78.44	
PCF gain from UDF				

=== 1993 ===
Legislative Election 1993: Allier's 3rd constituency
Party	Candidate	Votes	%	±%
UDF	Bernard Coulon	18,762	37.90	+ 5.99
PCF	André Lajoinie	17,317	34.99	−5.32
PS	Jean Mallot	4.788	9.67	−9.81
FN	Jacques Mayadoux	3,670	7.41	+1.24
LV	Michel Durant	2,674	5.40	
The Clover - The New Ecologists	Sylvie Sousa-Lopes	1,182	2.39	
CNIP	Pierre-Yves Chabuel	1,105	2.23	
Turnout		52,083	72.62	+2.35
2nd round result
UDF	Bernard Coulon	27,059	51.23	+ 6.74
PCF	André Lajoinie	25,759	48.77	− 6.74
Turnout		55,352	77.18	+1.38
UDF gain from PCF				

=== 1988 ===
Candidate	Party	Alliance	First round			Second round		
Candidate	Party	Alliance	Votes	%	+/–	Votes	%	+/–
André Lajoinie (incumbent)	PCF		20,052	40.31	+0.57	29,431	55.51	-1.58
Bernard Coulon	UDF	PR, URC	15,875	31.91	-1.02	23,592	44.49	+1.58
Marcel Pisani	PS		9,691	19.48	-7.84	WITHDREW		
Jean-Claude Candille	FN		3,069	6.17				
Philippe Genest	DVD		1,059	2.13				
Valid votes			49,746	97.74	-0.98	53,023	96.60	-0.17
Blank or Null votes			1,148	2.26	+0.98	1,865	3.40	+0.17
Turnout			50,894	70.27	-5.57	54,888	75.80	-3.35
Abstentions			21,536	29.76	+5.57	17,527	24.20	+3.35
Registered voters			72,430			72,415		
Result						PCF HOLD		

=== 1981 ===
Candidate	Party	Alliance	First round			Second round		
Candidate	Party	Alliance	Votes	%	+/–	Votes	%	+/–
André Lajoinie (incumbent)	PCF		17,199	39.74	+3.57	25,277	57.09	+5.33
Edmond Maupoil	UDF	Rad	14,252	32.93	+7.49	19,002	42.91	-5.33
Louis Huguet	PS		11,824	27.32	+10.43	WITHDREW		
Valid votes			43,275	98.72	+0.73	44,279	96.77	-0.91
Blank or Null votes			563	1.28	-0.73	1,478	3.23	+0.91
Turnout			43,838	75.84	-9.18	45,757	79.15	-8.33
Abstentions			13,969	24.16	+9.18	12,054	20.85	+8.33
Registered voters			57,807			57,811		
Result						PCF HOLD		

=== 1978 ===
Candidate	Party	Alliance	First round			Second round		
Candidate	Party	Alliance	Votes	%	+/–	Votes	%	+/–
André Lajoinie	PCF		17,361	36.17	-0.85	25,477	51.76	-1.67
Edmond Maupoil	UDF	Rad	12,211	25.44		23,740	48.24	
René Maëder	RPR		8,739	18.21		WITHDREW		
Roger Limoges	PS		8,104	16.89	-0.60	WITHDREW		
Yvette Costes	LO		1,579	3.29	+0.10			
Valid votes			47,994	97.99	+0.14	49,217	97.68	+1.92
Blank or Null votes			982	2.01	-0.14	1,170	2.32	-1.92
Turnout			48,976	85.02	+4.40	50,387	87.48	+4.97
Abstentions			8,630	14.98	-4.40	7,210	12.52	-4.97
Registered voters			57,606			57,597		
Result						PCF HOLD		

=== 1973 ===
Candidate	Party	Alliance	First round			Second round		
Candidate	Party	Alliance	Votes	%	+/–	Votes	%	+/–
Pierre Villon (incumbent)	PCF		15,988	37.02	-0.76	23,109	53.43	+3.01
Joseph Katz	UDR	URP	12,412	28.74	-8.84	20,144	46.57	-3.01
Henri Sarron	PS	UGSD	7,554	17.49	+3.23	WITHDREW		
Jacques Dupuydauby	DVD		5,014	11.61				
Annie Souchon	LO		1,377	3.19				
Robert Forge	DVD		845	1.96				
Valid votes			43,190	97.85	=0.19	43,253	95.76	-0.72
Blank or Null votes			949	2.15	+0.19	1,914	4.24	+0.72
Turnout			44,139	80.62	0.60	45,167	82.51	+2.67
Abstentions			10,610	19.38	-0.60	9,577	17.49	-2.67
Registered voters			54,749			54,744		
Result						PCF HOLD		

=== 1968 ===
Candidate	Party	Alliance	First round			Second round		
Candidate	Party	Alliance	Votes	%	+/–	Votes	%	+/–
Pierre Villon (incumbent)	PCF		16,672	37.78	-0.48	21,842	50.42	-4.68
Joseph Katz	UDR	URP	16,585	37.58		21,478	49.58	
Roger Southon	SFIO		10,877	24.65	-0.24	WITHDREW		
Valid votes			44,134	98.04	+0.04	43,320	96.48	+0.41
Blank or Null votes			881	1.96	-0.04	1,914	4.24	+0.72
Turnout			45,015	80.02	+1.90	44,902	79.84	+0.37
Abstentions			11,238	19.98	-1.90	11,335	20.16	-0.37
Registered voters			56,253			56,237		
Result						PCF HOLD		

=== 1967 ===
Candidate	Party	Alliance	First round			Second round		
Candidate	Party	Alliance	Votes	%	+/–	Votes	%	+/–
Pierre Villon	PCF		16,677	39.26	-0.67	23,950	55.10	+11.01
Henri Tardivat	UD-V^{E}		11,202	25.70		19,518	44.90	
Antoine Lacroix	SFIO	FGDS	10,849	24.89	+1.05	WITHDREW		
Jean Dye	CD	PDM	3,548	8.14				
Gaston Paul	Modérés		1,311	3.01				
Valid votes			43,587	98.00	+0.05	43,468	96.07	-0.90
Blank or Null votes			891	2.00	-0.05	1,779	3.93	+0.90
Turnout			44,478	78.12	+12.03	45,247	79.47	+7.56
Abstentions			12,460	21.88	-12.03	11,689	20.53	-7.56
Registered voters			56,938			56,936		
Result						PCF GAIN		

=== 1962 ===
Candidate	Party	Alliance	First round			Second round		
Candidate	Party	Alliance	Votes	%	+/–	Votes	%	+/–
Pierre Villon (incumbent)	PCF		14,879	38.93	+3.62	18,176	44.09	+6.11
Charles Magne	SFIO		9,109	23.84	-3.95	20,770	50.38	+12.67
Daniel Poliak	UNR-UDT		6,874	17.99		2,283	5.54	
Louis Dumas	CNIP		5,227	13.68		WITHDREW		
Édouard Kuntz	Radcent		2,126	5.56		WITHDREW		
Valid votes			38,215	97.95	+0.11	41,229	96.97	-2.02
Blank or Null votes			798	2.05	-0.11	1,290	3.03	-2.02
Turnout			39,013	66.09	-5.51	42,519	71.91	-3.02
Abstentions			20,018	33.91	+5.51	16,612	28.09	+3.02
Registered voters			59,031			59,131		
Result						SFIO GAIN		

=== 1958 ===
Candidate	Party	Alliance	First round			Second round		
Candidate	Party	Alliance	Votes	%	+/–	Votes	%	+/–
Pierre Villon	PCF		15,163	35.31		17,267	37.98	
Charles Magne	SFIO		11,933	27.79		17,145	37.71	
Pierre Nigay	CR		9,097	21.19		11,000	2.42	
Gaston Paul	Modérés		4,242	9.88		488	0.11	
Maurice Gaillard	UFF		2,503	5.83		WITHDREW		
Valid votes			42,938	97.84		45,460	98.99	
Blank or Null votes			946	2.16		464	1.01	
Turnout			43,884	71.60		45,924	74.93	
Abstentions			17,409	28.40		15,363	25.07	
Registered voters			61,293			61,287		
Result						PCF GAIN		

== Sources ==
- Official results of French elections from 1998: "Résultats électoraux officiels en France" (in French). Archived from the original on 20 December 2011.
