= Le Vernet, Allier =

Le Vernet
- Commune
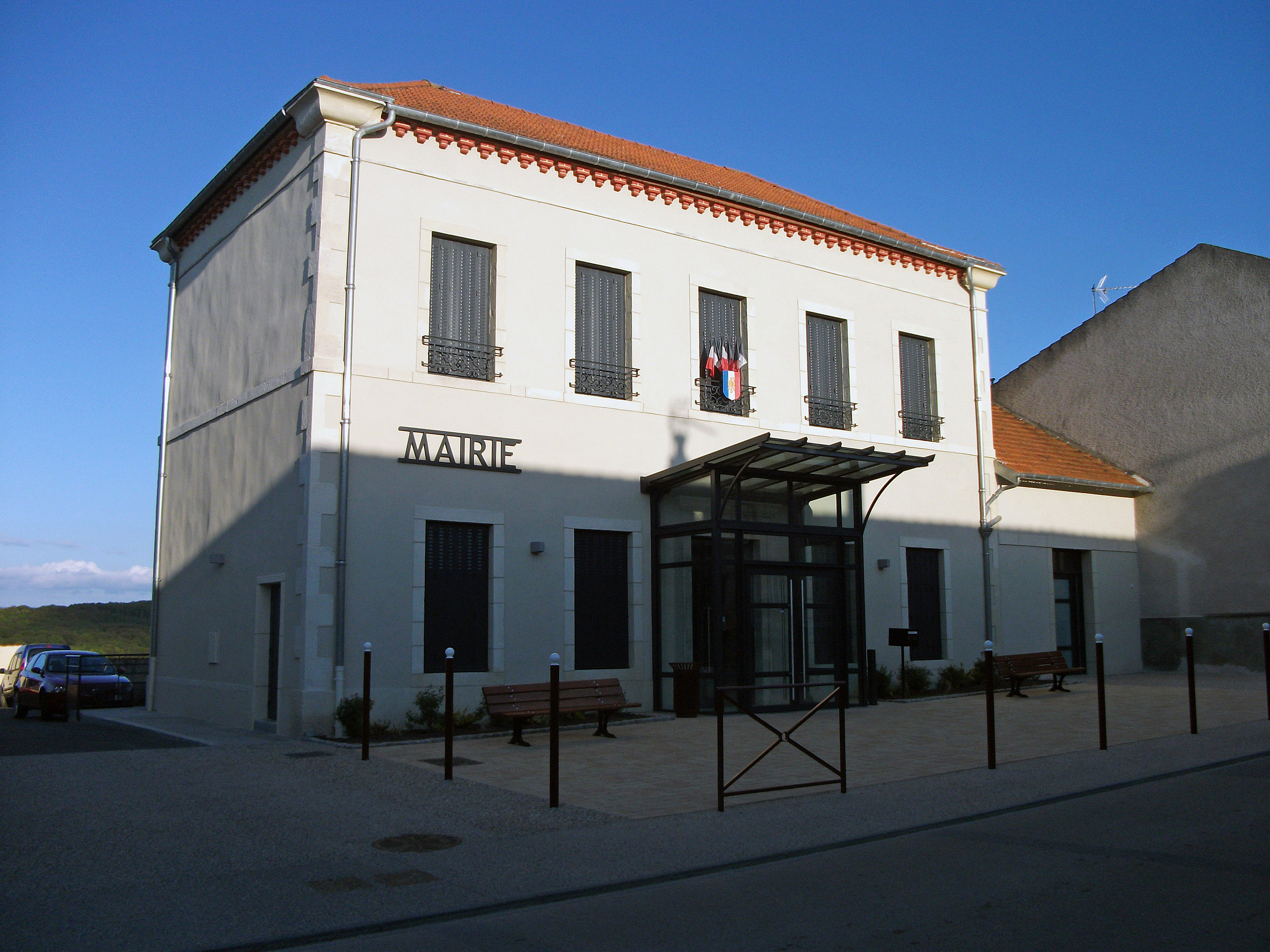
- Town hall in 2014

- Coat of arms
- Location of Le Vernet
- Location within France Location within Auvergne-Rhône-Alpes
- Coordinates: 46°06′34″N 3°27′49″E
- Country: France
- Region: Auvergne-Rhône-Alpes
- Department: Allier
- Arrondissement: Vichy
- Canton: Lapalisse
- Intercommunality: CA Vichy Communauté

Government
  - Mayor (2026–32): Bernard Aguiar
- Area^{1}: 10.07 km^{2} (3.89 sq mi)
- Elevation: 320 m (1,050 ft)
- Highest elevation: 504 m (1,654 ft)
- Lowest elevation: 279 m (915 ft)
- Population (2023): 1,919
  - Density: 190.6/km^{2} (493.6/sq mi)
- Time zone: UTC+01:00 (CET)
  - Summer (DST): UTC+02:00 (CEST)
- INSEE/Postal code: 03306 /03200
- ^{1} French Land Register data, which excludes lakes, ponds, glaciers > 1 km^{2} (0.386 sq mi or 247 acres) and river estuaries.

Le Vernet (French pronunciation: [lə vɛʁnɛ]) is a commune in the Allier department in Auvergne-Rhône-Alpes in central France.

== Population ==
Historical population

Year	Pop.	±% p.a.
1793	1,410	—
1800	889	−6.38%
1806	931	+0.77%
1821	1,056	+0.84%
1831	1,072	+0.15%
1836	1,119	+0.86%
1841	1,050	−1.26%
1846	1,087	+0.70%
1851	1,060	−0.50%
1856	1,019	−0.79%
1861	1,089	+1.34%
1866	1,058	−0.58%
1872	1,033	−0.40%
1876	1,037	+0.10%
1881	981	−1.10%
1886	984	+0.06%
1891	992	+0.16%
1896	981	−0.22%
1901	902	−1.67%

Year	Pop.	±% p.a.
1906	886	−0.36%
1911	784	−2.42%
1921	592	−2.77%
1926	643	+1.67%
1931	670	+0.83%
1936	642	−0.85%
1946	578	−1.04%
1954	725	+2.87%
1962	771	+0.77%
1968	883	+2.29%
1975	985	+1.57%
1982	1,175	+2.55%
1990	1,430	+2.49%
1999	1,585	+1.15%
2007	1,757	+1.30%
2012	1,934	+1.94%
2017	1,941	+0.07%
2023	1,919	−0.19%

Source: EHESS and INSEE

== Administration ==
- 1793–1801: member of the canton of Vichy
- 1801–1892: member of the canton of Cusset
- 1892–1973: member of the canton of Vichy
- 1973–1985: member of the canton of Vichy-Sud
- 1985–2015: member of the canton of Cusset-Sud
- 2015–: member of the canton of Lapalisse

=== List of mayors ===
- 1977–2001: Gérard Charasse
- 2001–2014: Patrick Argout
- 2014–current: Bernard Aguiar

== See also ==
- Communes of the Allier department
