= Nicolas Ray =

French politician (born 1981)

- Parliamentary group: UDC

Deputy for Allier's 3rd constituency in the National Assembly of France
- Incumbent
- Assumed office 22 June 2022
- Preceded by: Bénédicte Peyrol

Personal details
- Born: 14 May 1981 (age 45) Vichy, France

Nicolas Ray (born 14 May 1981) is a French politician who has been serving as a deputy for Allier's 3rd constituency since the 2022 French legislative election, representing the Republicans (LR).

== Early life and education ==
Born in Vichy, Ray graduated from the Paris Institute of Political Studies, where he specialized in economics and public law.

== Early career ==
Having become the main public finance inspector at the DGFIP (tax agency) for the Allier department, he was also an accounting agent of the Department's Chamber of Agriculture. He also practiced at the cash in Vic-sur-Cère, in Cantal.

== Political career ==
=== Career in local politics ===
In 2001, Ray appeared on the list of outgoing mayor Joseph Bléthon at the Cusset Municipal Council. He joined the UMP in 2003.

Ray has been a municipal councillor of Bellerive-sur-Allier since 2014.

In 2017, Ray was the substitute of the (LR) candidate Gabriel Maquin for Allier's 3rd constituency.

=== Member of the National Assembly, 2022–present ===
On 3 April 2022 Ray announced, in Gannat, his candidacy for the legislative elections, again in Allier's 3rd constituency.

Ray was elected on 19 June 2022, with the Les Républicains label, against Bénédicte Peyrol, the outgoing deputy (LREM). He came first in 87 of the 88 municipalities in the constituency.

In the run-up to the Republicans’ 2022 convention, Ray endorsed Éric Ciotti as the party's chairman.
