= Bernard Lesterlin =

French politician and official

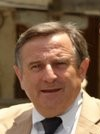
- Lesterlin in 2012

Administrator Superior of Wallis and Futuna
- In office 3 December 1985 – 17 April 1986
- Preceded by: Michel Kuhnmunch
- Succeeded by: Jacques Le Hénaff

Member of the French National Assembly for Allier's 2nd constituency
- In office 20 June 2007 – 20 June 2017
- Preceded by: Pierre Goldberg
- Succeeded by: Laurence Vanceunebrock-Mialon

Personal details
- Born: 18 September 1949 (age 76) Vienne, Isère, France
- Party: Socialist Party

Bernard Lesterlin (born 18 September 1949) is a French civil servant and former member of the National Assembly. He has served as the Administrator Superior of Wallis and Futuna (1985–1986). He represented the 2nd constituency of the Allier department from 2007 to 2017, and is a member of the Socialist Party. He was part of Ségolène Royal's political advisory team.

== Early life ==
Lesterin was born in Vienne, Isère. The son of a doctor, Bernard Lesterlin was noted for his student activism in Grenoble (he was the founder of student group Mouvement d'action et de recherche critique). He became Louis Mermaz's deputy chief of staff and then François Mitterrand's assistant.

== Career ==
=== Civil servant ===
He was Administrator Superior of Wallis and Futuna in 1985 - 1986, sub-prefect of the Arrondissement of Le Vigan (Gard) from 1986 to 1989, as well as sub-prefect in Montluçon until 2002.

=== Deputy ===
Lesterlin was a member of the Socialist Party for 35 years. He was elected deputy in the 2007 French legislative election, in Allier's 2nd constituency, beating Daniel Dugléry (UMP) in the second round with 53.39% of the vote. He succeeded Pierre Goldberg (PCF), who resigned on 16 March 2007. He was re-elected for a second term in the 2012 elections, beating Daniel Dugléry (UMP) in the second round. His alternate is Nicolas Brien.

On 12 May 2016, he announced that he would leave the Socialist group in the National Assembly and go on leave from the Socialist Party.

He did not stand for re-election at the 2017 election.
