= Jacques Boyon =

French politician (1934–2019)

Deputy of the National Assembly for Ain's 1st constituency
- In office 1978 – 1981, then 1988-1997

Deputy of the National Assembly for Ain
- In office 1986–1988

Personal details
- Born: 30 September 1934 Nantes, France
- Died: 15 January 2019 (aged 84) France
- Citizenship: French
- Party: RPR
- Relatives: Michel Boyon (brother)
- Education: Sciences Po, ÉNA

Jacques Boyon (30 September 1934 – 15 January 2019) was a French politician who served as Deputy of the National Assembly for Ain from 1978 to 1981, 1986 to 1988, and 1988 to 1997. He was also mayor of Pont-d'Ain, president of the General Council of Ain, and secretary of state for defense under Jacques Chirac's government from 1986 to 1988.

== Early life ==
Jacques Boyon was the son of Marc Boyon, a normalist and aggregator of grammar, and a teacher of letters, history and geography, and brother of Michel Boyon.

Jacques Boyon was a member of the Honorary Committee of the Initiative and Freedom Movement. A former pupil of the ENA, he was appointed in 1960 Auditor at the Court of Auditors.

== Political career ==
He was promoted to a councilor in 1986. He was deputy in the National Assembly for Ain, mayor of Pont-d'Ain, president of the General Council of Ain and secretary of state for defense under the government of cohabitation of Jacques Chirac from 1986 to 1988. He was president of the Lake Geneva Council from 1989 to 1991. He was then Chairman of the Board of the Institute of International and Strategic Relations between 2005 and 2012.
