= Allier's 4th constituency =

Constituency of the French Fifth Republic

4th constituency of Allier
- inline Constituency of the National Assembly of France
- Deputy: Gérard Charasse; Left Radical
- Department: Allier
- Cantons: Cusset Nord, Cusset Sud, Escurolles, Lapalisse, Le Mayet-de-Montagne, Vichy Nord, Vichy Sud

The 4th constituency of Allier was a French legislative constituency in the Allier département. For the June 2012 legislative election, Allier's "entitlement" of seats was reduced from four to three. The 4th constituency was therefore abolished, its constituent cantons being included in a revised 3rd constituency.

== Election results ==
=== 2007 ===
Summary of the 10 June and 17 June 2007 French legislative in Allier's 4th Constituency election results
| Candidate | Party | | 1st round | | 2nd round | |
| Candidate | Party | | Votes | % | Votes | % |
|---|---|---|---|---|---|---|
| Gérard Charasse | Radical Party of the Left | PRG | 15,729 | 39.20% | 24,066 | 56.54% |
| Claude Malhuret | Union for a Popular Movement | UMP | 16,148 | 40.25% | 18,499 | 43.46% |
| Sophie Bege | Democratic Movement | MoDem | 2,000 | 4.98% | | |
| Pascale Semet | Communist | COM | 1,899 | 4.73% | | |
| Louis de Conde | National Front | FN | 1,622 | 4.04% | | |
| Daniel Rondepierre | The Greens | VEC | 861 | 2.15% | | |
| Thomas Vacheron | Far Left | EXG | 655 | 1.63% | | |
| Jacques Mayadoux | Movement for France | MPF | 461 | 1.15% | | |
| Albert Peyron | Ecologist | ECO | 327 | 0.82% | | |
| Nadine Picouleau | Hunting, Fishing, Nature, Traditions | CPNT | 261 | 0.65% | | |
| Monique Roche | Far Left | EXG | 158 | 0.39% | | |
| Marc-Claude de Portebane | Miscellaneous Right | DVD | 1 | 0.00% | | |
| Louis Vitti | Divers | DIV | 0 | 0.00% | | |
| Total | | | 40,122 | 100% | 42,565 | 100% |
| Registered voters | | | 64,844 | | 64,842 | |
| Blank/Void ballots | | | 671 | 1.64% | 988 | 2.27% |
| Turnout | | | 40,793 | 62.91% | 43,553 | 67.17% |
| Abstentions | | | 24,051 | 37.09% | 21,289 | 32.83% |
| Result | | | | | PRG HOLD | |

== Sources ==
- Official results of French elections from 1998: "Résultats électoraux officiels en France" (in French). Archived from the original on 2011-12-20.
