= Jean-Michel Bertrand =

French politician

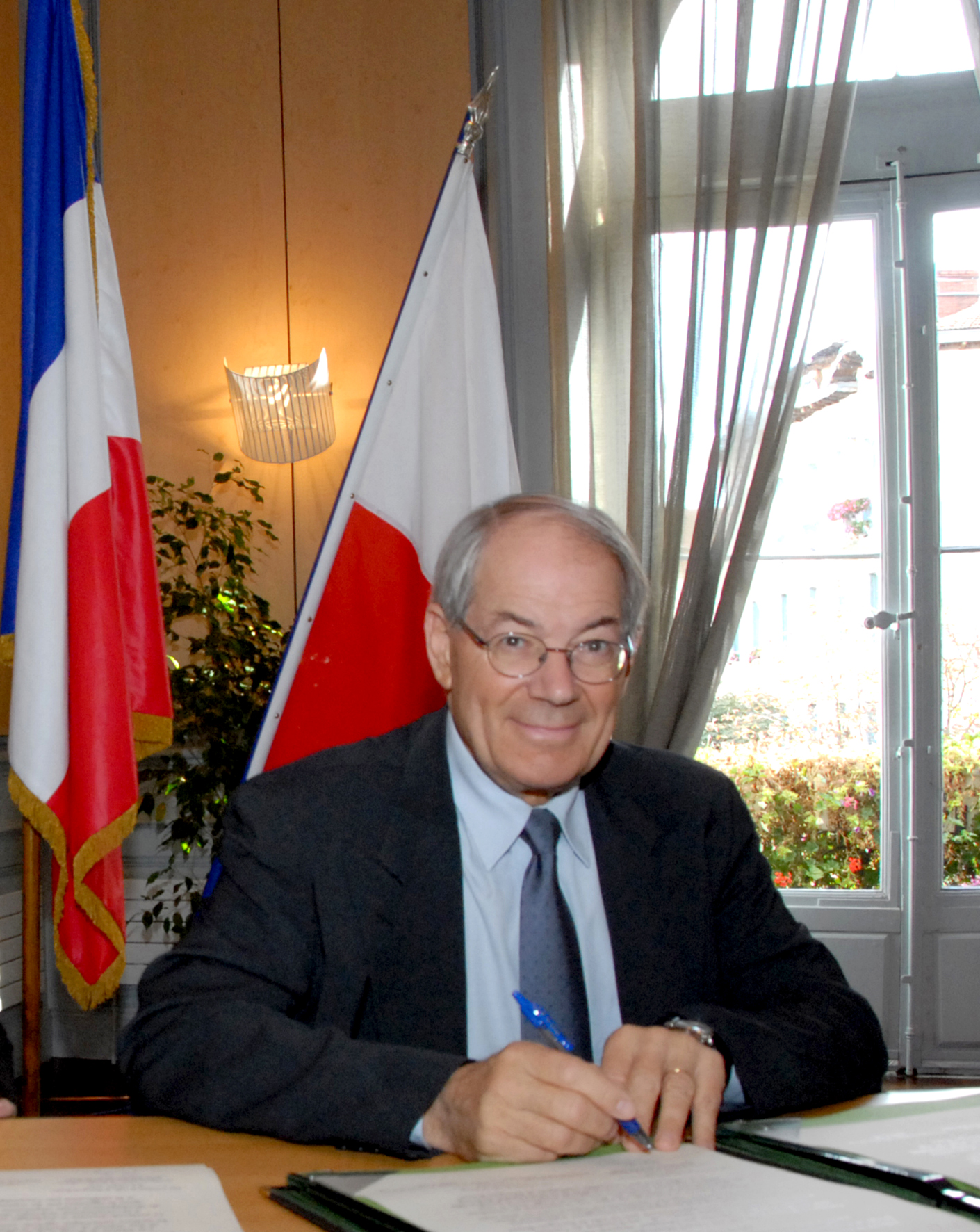
Bertrand in 2008

Jean-Michel Bertrand (6 June 1943 at Baccarat, Meurthe-et-Moselle – 19 February 2008 at the Hôpital Saint-Louis in Paris) was a French politician of the Union for a Popular Movement (UMP).

== Biography ==
A pharmacist by occupation, Jean-Michel Bertrand was elected mayor of Bourg-en-Bresse on 25 March 2001, then MP on 16 June 2002, for the twelfth legislature (2002–2007).

During his political career he was a member of the Council on National Road Safety (Conseil national de sécurité routière CNSR), and made 38 proposals on such issues.

For health reasons, Jean-Michel Bertrand was not a candidate re-election in 2007. Xavier Breton, 1st assistant to the mayor of Bourg-en-Bresse, was elected MP on 17 June 2007.

Sometimes nicknamed "the bulldozer of the Dombes" for municipal action, Jean-Michel Bertrand died on 19 February 2008 aged 64. He was suffering from a Myelodysplastic syndrome.

== Awards ==
By decree of the President dated 30 January 2008, Jean-Michel Bertrand was made a Knight of the Legion of Honour.
