= 1997 French legislative election =

- 25 May and 1 June 1997

All 577 seats in the French National Assembly 289 seats needed for a majority
- Turnout: 67.9% (▼2.0 pp) (1st round); 71.1% (▲2.2 pp) (2nd round)
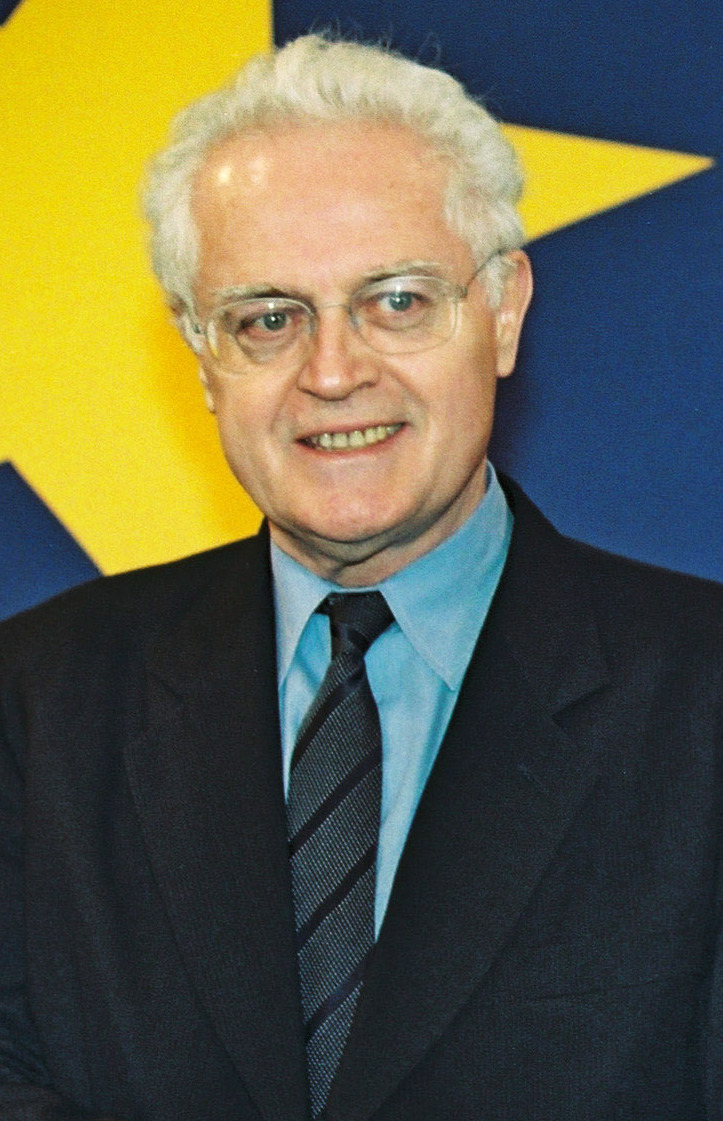

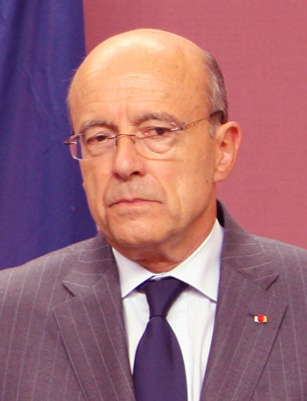

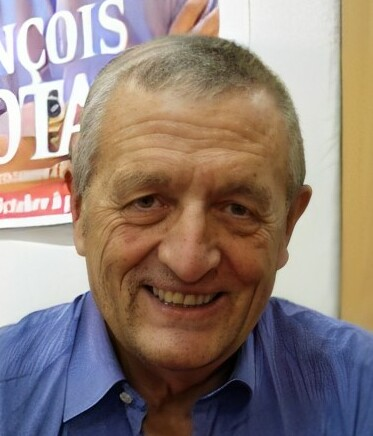

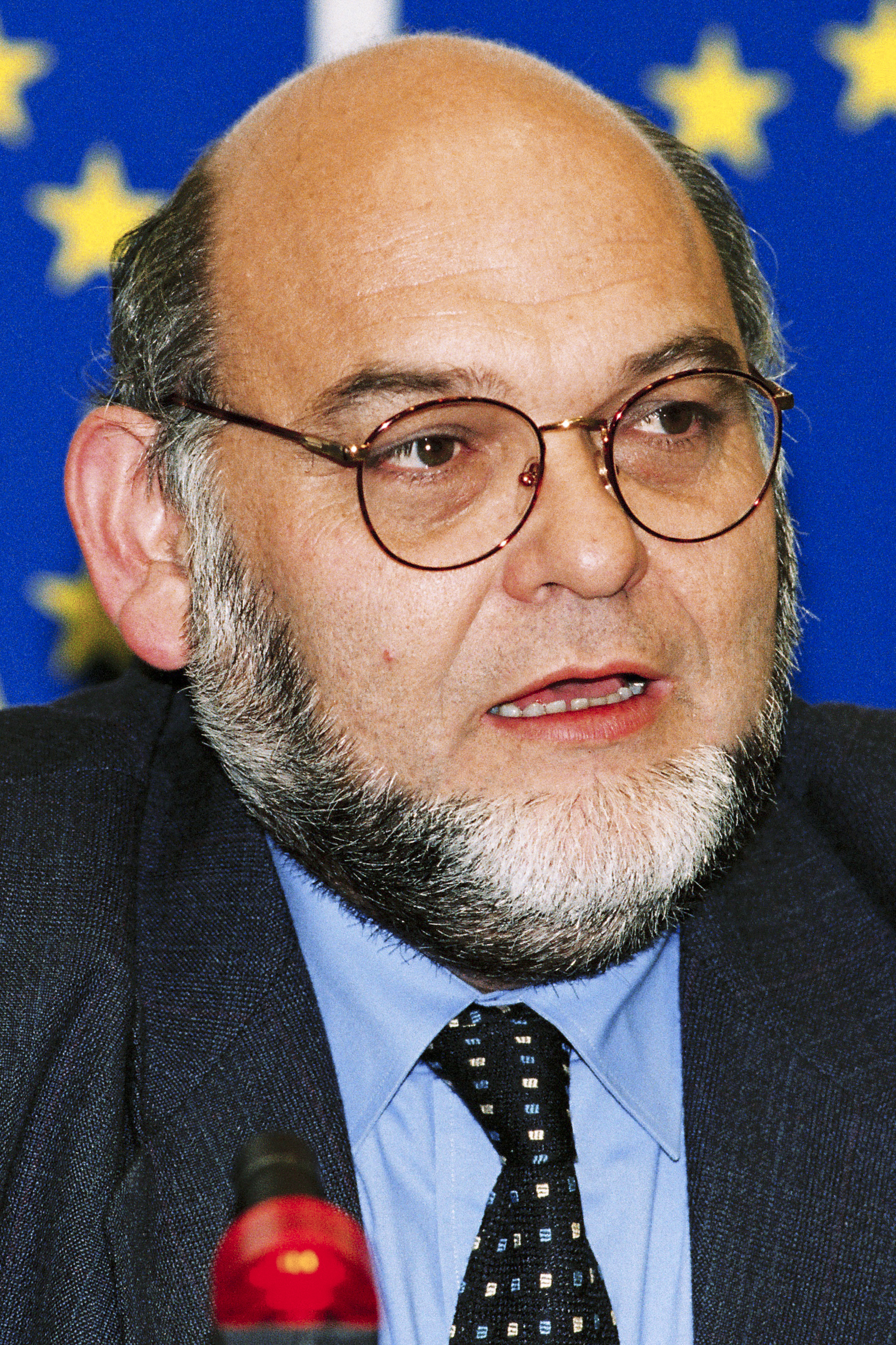

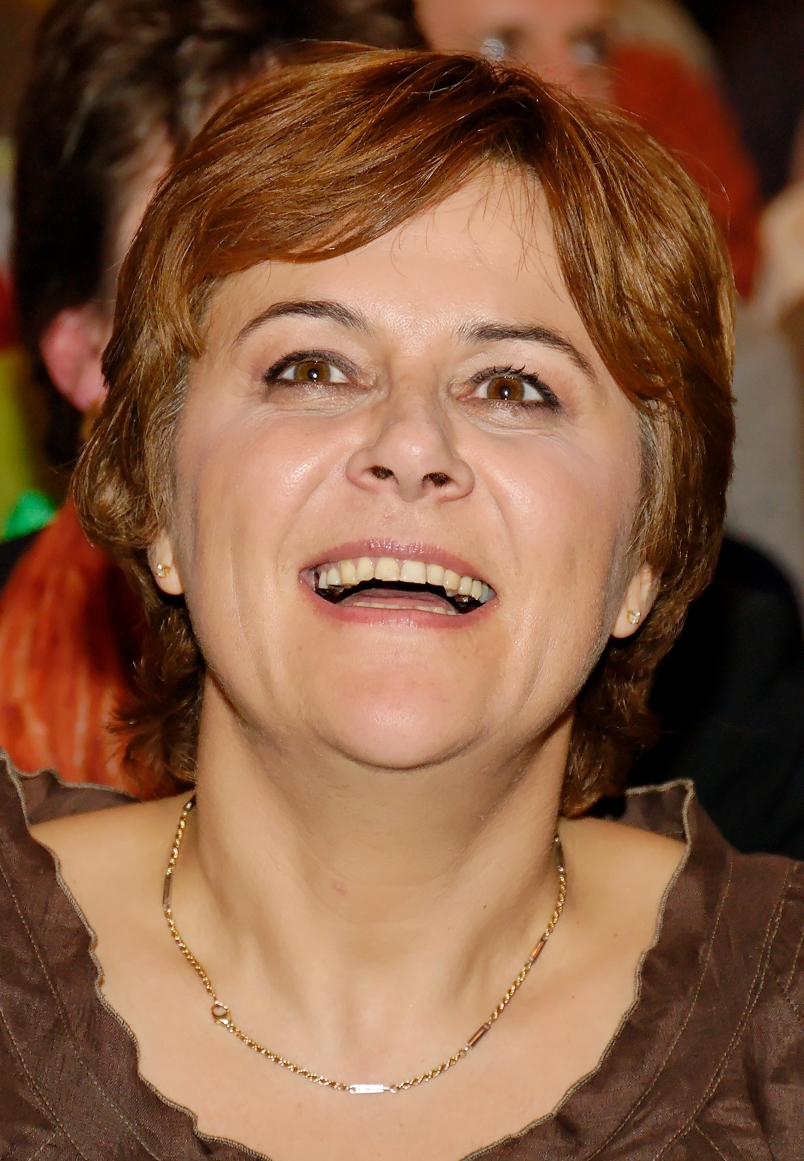

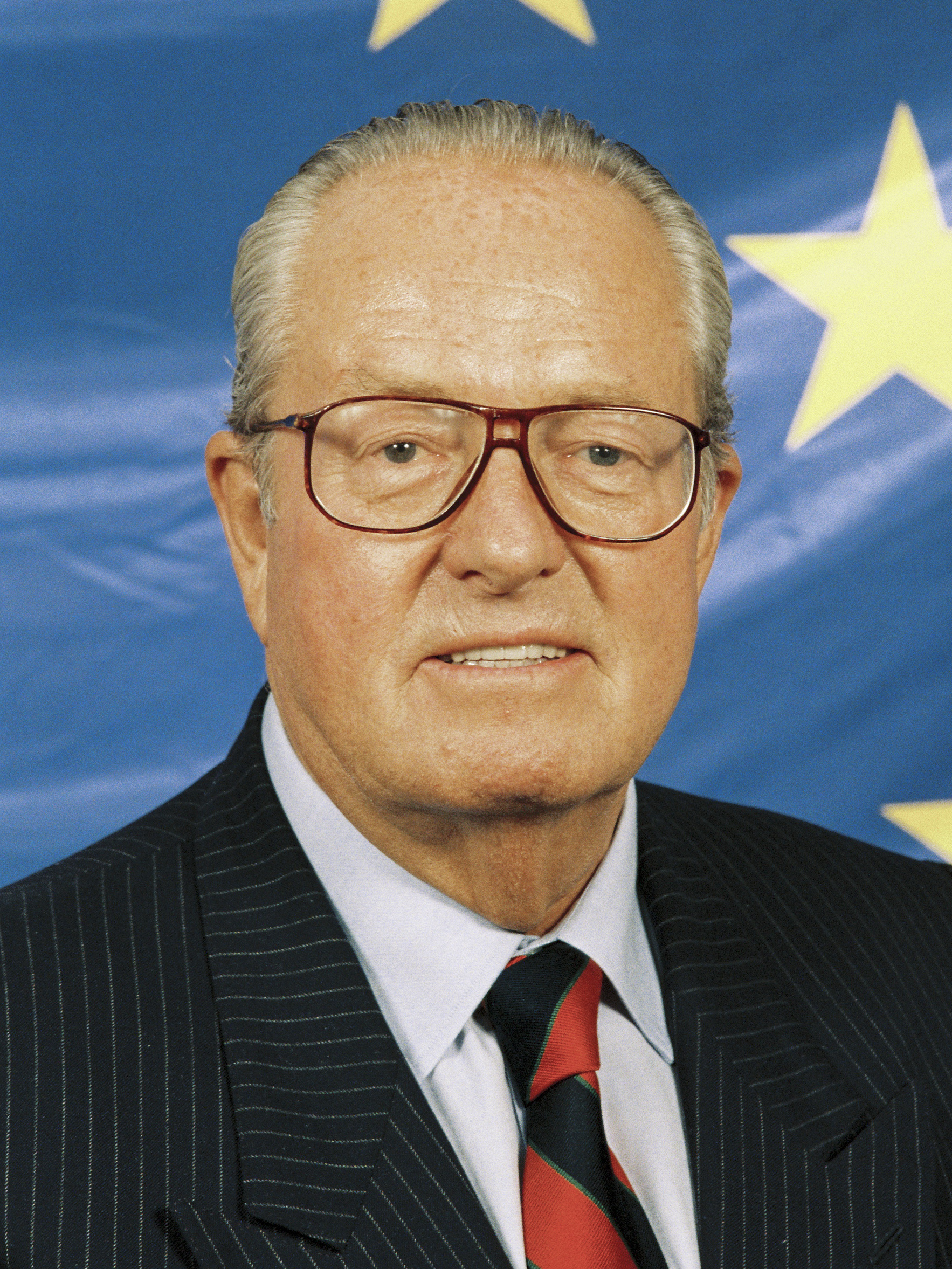
	First party	Second party	Third party
Leader	Lionel Jospin	Alain Juppé	François Léotard
Party	PS	RPR	UDF
Leader's seat	Haute-Garonne-7th	Gironde-2nd	Var-5th
Last election	53 seats, 17.6%	242 seats, 20.4%	207 seats, 19.1%
Seats won	255	139	112
Seat change	▲202	▼103	▼95
Popular vote	5,961,612 (1st round); 9,751,423 (2nd round)	3,977,964 (1st round); 5,846,717 (2nd round)	3,601,279 (1st round); 5,323,177 (2nd round)
Percentage	23.53% (1st round); 38.05% (2nd round)	15.70% (1st round); 22.82% (2nd round)	14.21% (1st round); 20.77% (2nd round)
	Fourth party	Fifth party	Sixth party
Leader	Robert Hue	Dominique Voynet	Jean-Marie Le Pen
Party	PCF	LV	FN
Leader's seat	Val-d'Oise-5th	none
Last election	24 seats, 9.2%	0 seats, 4.0%	0 seats, 12.4%
Seats won	35	7	1
Seat change	▲9	▲7	▲1
Popular vote	2,519,281 (1st round); 982,990 (2nd round)	1,726,018 (1st round); 414,871 (2nd round)	3,785,383 (1st round); 1,434,854 (2nd round)
Percentage	9.94% (1st round); 3.84% (2nd round)	6.81% (1st round); 1.62% (2nd round)	14.94% (1st round); 5.60% (2nd round)
Prime Minister before election
Alain Juppé
Elected Prime Minister
Lionel Jospin
PS

Legislative elections were held in France on 25 May and 1 June 1997 to elect the 11th National Assembly of the French Fifth Republic. It was the consequence of President Jacques Chirac's decision to call the legislative election one year before the deadline.

In March 1993 the right won a large victory in the legislative election and a comfortable parliamentary majority. Two years later, the RPR leader Jacques Chirac was elected President of France promising to reduce the "social fracture". However, the programme of welfare reforms ("Plan Juppé") proposed by his Prime Minister Alain Juppé caused a social crisis in November and December 1995. The popularity of the executive duo decreased.

In spring 1997 President Chirac tried to take the left-wing opposition by surprise by dissolving the National Assembly. The first opinion polls indicated a re-election of the right-wing majority. The "Plural Left" coalition, composed of the Socialists, the Communists, the Greens, the Citizens' Movement, and the Left Radicals, proposed a program of social reforms to reduce unemployment and legislation to limit the length of the work week to 35 hours. Prime Minister Juppé's unpopularity, as well as the unpopularity of his government's policies, contributed to the left's triumph.

In the first round, the left-wing coalition obtained more votes than the incumbent parliamentary majority. After he was blamed for the situation, Juppé announced he would resign even if the right kept their majority in the runoff vote. For all that, the "Plural left" obtained the majority of the seats; however the Socialists needed its allies to form a majority. For the first time, the ecologists were represented in the Parliament. The participation of the National Front's candidates in the second round increased the defeat of the presidential majority.

This was the first time since 1877 that a President of France lost a legislative election that he had called. The Socialist leader Lionel Jospin became Prime Minister of the third cohabitation. It finished with the 2002 French presidential election, which Jospin unexpectedly lost in the first round, causing his retirement from politics.

== Results ==
Party	First round		Second round		Total seats
Party	Votes	%	Votes	%	Total seats
Socialist Party	5,961,612	23.53	9,751,423	38.05	255
Rally for the Republic	3,977,964	15.70	5,846,717	22.82	139
National Front	3,785,383	14.94	1,434,854	5.60	1
Union for French Democracy	3,601,279	14.21	5,323,177	20.77	112
French Communist Party	2,519,281	9.94	982,990	3.84	35
The Greens	1,726,018	6.81	414,871	1.62	7
Miscellaneous right	1,671,626	6.60	628,468	2.45	2
Miscellaneous left	708,605	2.80	652,882	2.55	11
Far-left	638,710	2.52			0
Radical-Socialist Party	366,067	1.44	562,031	2.19	12
Miscellaneous	351,503	1.39	28,916	0.11	3
Far-right	26,438	0.10			0
Total	25,334,486	100.00	25,626,329	100.00	577
Valid votes	25,334,486	95.11	25,626,329	93.68	
Invalid/blank votes	1,301,456	4.89	1,727,669	6.32	
Total votes	26,635,942	100.00	27,353,998	100.00	
Registered voters/turnout	39,217,241	67.92	38,487,205	71.07	
Source: National Assembly

=== Parliamentary groups in the National Assembly ===
Group	Members	Caucusing	Total
Socialist Group	242	8	250
RPR Group	136	6	140
UDF Group	107	6	113
Communist Group	34	2	36
Radical, Citizen and Green	33	0	33
Non-Inscrits	5	0	5
Total	555	22	577

== See also ==
- List of deputies of the 11th National Assembly of France
