= Results of the 2024 French legislative election in Haute-Marne =

Following the first round of the 2024 French legislative election on 30 June 2024, runoff elections in each constituency where no candidate received a vote share greater than 50 percent were scheduled for 7 July. Candidates permitted to stand in the runoff elections needed to either come in first or second place in the first round or achieve more than 12.5 percent of the votes of the entire electorate (as opposed to 12.5 percent of the vote share due to low turnout).

== Haute-Marne ==
=== 1st constituency ===
Candidate	Party or alliance		First round		Second round	
Candidate	Party or alliance		Votes	%	Votes	%
Christophe Bentz	National Rally		21,815	48.83	23,772	53.90
Bérangère Abba	Ensemble	Horizons	12,529	28.05	20,335	46.10
Benjamin Lambert	New Popular Front	Socialist Party	9,104	20.38		
Sylvain Demay	Far-left	Lutte Ouvrière	869	1.95		
Baptiste Gallet	Independent		355	0.79		
Total			44,672	100.00	44,107	100.00
Valid votes			44,672	95.88	44,107	94.31
Invalid votes			763	1.64	814	1.74
Blank votes			1,159	2.49	1,847	3.95
Total votes			46,594	100.00	46,768	100.00
Registered voters/turnout			69,171	67.36	69,173	67.61

=== 2nd constituency ===
Candidate	Party or alliance		Votes	%
Laurence Robert-Dehault	National Rally		21,009	56.82
Nicolas Lacroix	Miscellaneous right	The Republicans	10,407	28.15
Ingrid Viot	New Popular Front	La France Insoumise	4,876	13.19
Justin Prum	Far-left	Lutte Ouvrière	684	1.85
Total			36,976	100.00
Valid votes			36,976	97.12
Invalid votes			426	1.12
Blank votes			670	1.76
Total votes			38,072	100.00
Registered voters/turnout			59,043	64.48
