= Sophie Delong =

French politician

Member of the Regional council of Grand Est
- Incumbent
- Assumed office 1 July 2021

Mayor of Langres
- In office 4 April 2014 – 4 July 2020
- Preceded by: Didier Loiseau
- Succeeded by: Anne Cardinal

Member of the National Assembly for Haute-Marne's 1st constituency
- In office 20 July 2007 – 16 June 2012
- Preceded by: Luc Chatel
- Succeeded by: Luc Chatel

Member of the Regional council of Champagne-Ardennes
- In office 21 March 2010 – 31 December 2015

Personal details
- Born: 17 July 1957 (age 69) Joinville, France
- Party: The Republicans
- Education: Nancy University
- Profession: Physician

Sophie Delong (French pronunciation: [sɔfi dəlɔ̃]; born 17 July 1957) is a French politician member of The Republicans. She was member of the National Assembly of France. She represented the Haute-Marne department.
