= Luc Chatel =

French politician (born 1964)

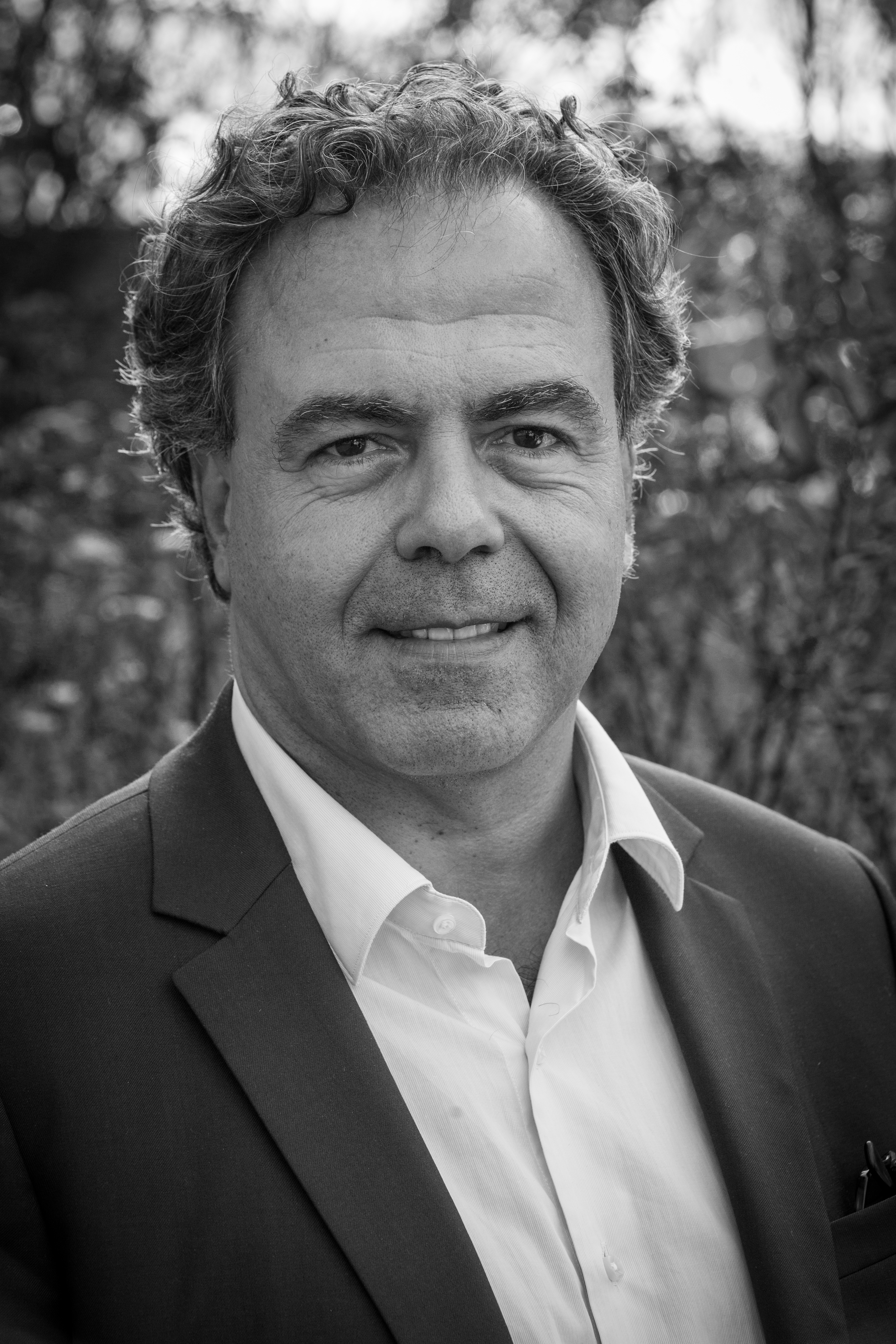
- Luc Chatel in 2015

Minister of National Education
- In office 23 June 2009 – 16 May 2012
- President: Nicolas Sarkozy
- Prime Minister: François Fillon
- Preceded by: Xavier Darcos
- Succeeded by: Vincent Peillon

Government Spokespeople
- In office 18 March 2008 – 13 November 2010
- President: Nicolas Sarkozy
- Prime Minister: François Fillon
- Preceded by: Laurent Wauquiez
- Succeeded by: François Baroin

Member of the National Assembly for Haute-Marne's 1st constituency
- In office 19 June 2012 – 19 June 2017
- Preceded by: Sophie Delong
- Succeeded by: Bérangère Abba

Personal details
- Born: 15 August 1964 (age 62) Bethesda, Maryland, U.S.
- Party: UMP; The Republicans
- Education: Lycée Saint-Louis-de-Gonzague
- Alma mater: University of Paris 1 Panthéon-Sorbonne

Luc-Marie Chatel (French: [lyk maʁi ʃatɛl]; born 15 August 1964) is a French politician of the Republicans (LR) who served as Minister of National Education in the government of Prime Minister François Fillon from June 2009 to May 2012. In 2014, he served as the acting chair of the Union for a Popular Movement (UMP).

Also, Chatel served as the Secretary of state for Consumer Affairs and Tourism from June 2007 to March 2008, and Government's Spokesman from June 2009 until November 2010.

== Political career ==
Governmental functions

- Minister of National Education, Youth and Voluntary : 2010–2012.
- Minister of National Education, government's spokesman : 2009–2010.
- Secretary of State for Industry and Consumer Affairs, government's spokesman : 2008–2009.
- Secretary of State for Consumer Affairs and Tourism : 2007–2008.

Electoral mandates

National Assembly of France

- Member of the National Assembly of France for Haute-Marne (1st constituency) : 2002-2007 (Became Secretary of State in 2007) / 2012–2017. Elected in 2002, reelected in 2007, 2012.

Regional Council

- Vice-president of the Regional Council of Champagne-Ardenne : 1998–2004.
- Regional councillor of Champagne-Ardenne : 1998–2010. Reelected in 2004.

Municipal Council

- Mayor of Chaumont : 2008-2013 (Resignation).
- Municipal councillor of Chaumont : 1996-2002 (Resignation). 2008–2014. Reelected in 2001, 2008.
- Municipal councillor of Bayard-sur-Marne : 1993–1995.

Community of Communes Council

- President of the Communes Community of the Pays chaumontais : 200–2014.
- Member of the Communes Community of the Pays chaumontais : 2008–2014.

Political function

- Spokesman of the Union for a Popular Movement : 2002–2007.

== Political positions ==
Within the UMP, Chatel initially was part of Les Réformateurs, the party’s liberal wing.

From August 2012, Chatel – alongside Jean-Pierre Raffarin, Jean Leonetti and Marc Laffineur – led Modern and Humanist France (France moderne et humaniste), a recognized movement within the UMP. In the UMP's 2012 leadership election, he endorsed Jean-François Copé.

Ahead of the Republicans’ 2016 primaries, Chatel endorsed Nicolas Sarkozy as the party’s candidate for 2017 presidential elections.

Political offices
Preceded by Xavier Darcos	Minister of National Education; 2009–2012	Succeeded by Vincent Peillon
