= 2024 French legislative election in Aube =

Following the first round of the 2024 French legislative election on 30 June 2024, runoff elections in each constituency where no candidate received a vote share greater than 50 percent were scheduled for 7 July. Candidates permitted to stand in the runoff elections needed to either come in first or second place in the first round or achieve more than 12.5 percent of the votes of the entire electorate (as opposed to 12.5 percent of the vote share due to low turnout).

== Aube ==
=== 1st constituency ===
Candidate	Party or alliance		Votes	%
Jordan Guitton	National Rally		22,636	53.84
Philippe Beury	Ensemble	Renaissance	7,898	18.79
Alice Barry	New Popular Front	Socialist Party	6,019	14.32
Chris Manieri-Bigorgne	The Republicans		4,921	11.70
Lionel Paillard	Far-left	Lutte Ouvrière	570	1.36
Total			42,044	100.00
Valid votes			42,044	96.67
Invalid votes			614	1.41
Blank votes			836	1.92
Total votes			43,494	100.00
Registered voters/turnout			63,973	67.99

=== 2nd constituency ===
Candidate	Party or alliance		First round		Second round	
Candidate	Party or alliance		Votes	%	Votes	%
Albéric Ferrand	National Rally		22,316	44.83	23,306	47.83
Valérie Bazin-Malgras	The Republicans		13,902	27.93	25,420	52.17
Samira Sebbari	New Popular Front	Miscellaneous left	8,256	16.58		
Salomé Fontaine-Garcia	Ensemble	Democratic Movement	4,703	9.45		
Romain Vallée	Far-left	Lutte Ouvrière	603	1.21		
Total			49,780	100.00	48,726	100.00
Valid votes			49,780	97.72	48,726	96.94
Invalid votes			451	0.89	385	0.77
Blank votes			708	1.39	1,152	2.29
Total votes			50,939	100.00	50,263	100.00
Registered voters/turnout			73,976	68.86	73,977	67.94

=== 3rd constituency ===
Candidate	Party or alliance		First round		Second round	
Candidate	Party or alliance		Votes	%	Votes	%
Angélique Ranc	National Rally		18,084	43.33	20,600	52.52
Olivier Girardin	New Popular Front	Socialist Party	10,178	24.39	18,624	47.48
Luc Scherrer	Ensemble	Renaissance	6,994	16.76		
Didier Leprince	The Republicans		3,654	8.76		
Olivier Richard	Miscellaneous right	Independent	1,502	3.60		
Nelly Collot-Touzé	Ecologists		970	2.32		
Pascal Andrieux	Far-left	Lutte Ouvrière	349	0.84		
Total			41,731	100.00	39,224	100.00
Valid votes			41,731	98.03	39,224	93.08
Invalid votes			309	0.73	682	1.62
Blank votes			531	1.25	2,234	5.30
Total votes			42,571	100.00	42,140	100.00
Registered voters/turnout			65,463	65.03	65,494	64.34
