= Cornut-Gentille =

Cornut-Gentille is a double-barrelled surname.

== People with the surname ==
- Bernard Cornut-Gentille (1909 –1992), French politician
- François Cornut-Gentille (born 1958), French politician
