= Modern and Humanist France =

Modern and Humanist France France moderne et humaniste
- Founder: Jean-Pierre Raffarin, Luc Chatel, Jean Leonetti, Marc Laffineur
- Founded: 2012
- Ideology: Christian democracy Liberalism; Pro-Europeanism
- Political position: Centre to Centre-right
- National affiliation: Union for a Popular Movement
- Colours: Blue

Website
- www.fmh-ump.fr

Modern and Humanist France (France moderne et humaniste) is a recognized movement within the Union for a Popular Movement (UMP). It was created in August 2012 and it is led by Jean-Pierre Raffarin, Luc Chatel, Jean Leonetti and Marc Laffineur.

== Ideology ==
The movement was created by former members of the Union for French Democracy (UDF), Rally for the Republic (RPR) and Liberal Democracy (DL) with the stated aim of uniting the party's liberals, Christian democrats, liberal conservatives and radicals; the broader centrist and moderate factions of the UMP.

== Weight within the UMP ==
As a motion for the November 2012 congress, the FMH placed third with 18.17% of the motions vote, a result viewed as disappointing its high profile leadership and strong support from UMP parliamentarians.

== Leadership and supporters ==
The movement's leaders are Jean-Pierre Raffarin (ex-DL), Luc Chatel (liberal, ex-RPR, Jean Leonetti (Radical Party), Marc Laffineur (ex-UDF), Marc-Philippe Daubresse (ex-UDF), Marie-Hélène des Esgaulx, Michèle Tabarot, Hervé Mariton and Franck Riester.

Parliamentarians which co-signed the motion included: Nicole Ameline, Christophe Béchu, Dominique Bussereau, Yves Censi, Raymond Couderc, Olivier Dassault, Dominique Dord, Jean-Claude Gaudin, Claude Goasguen, Jean-Pierre Gorges, Sébastien Huyghe, Jean-François Lamour, Gérard Longuet, Jean-Luc Moudenc, Henri de Raincourt, Valérie Rosso-Debord and Lionel Tardy. Parliaments could co-sign more than one motion.
