= Bérangère Abba =

French politician (born 1976)

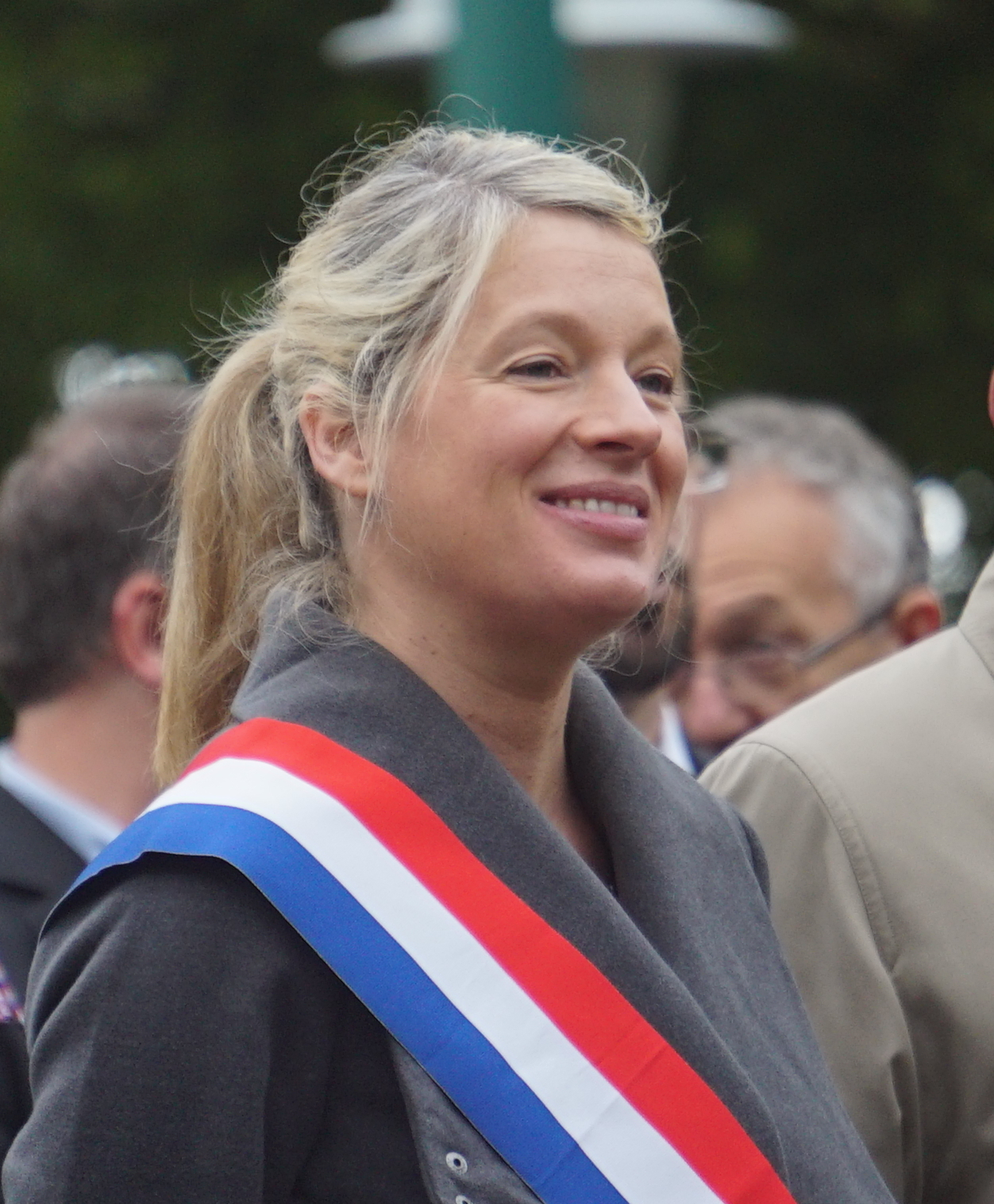
- Abba in 2017

Secretary of State for Biodiversity
- In office 27 July 2020 – 20 May 2022
- Prime Minister: Jean Castex
- Preceded by: Barbara Pompili (2017)
- Succeeded by: Bérangère Couillard (Ecology)

Member of the National Assembly for Haute-Marne's 1st constituency
- In office 21 June 2017 – 27 August 2020
- Preceded by: Luc Chatel
- Succeeded by: Sylvain Templier

Personal details
- Born: Bérangère Fabienne Maria Abba; 22 October 1976 (age 49) Chaumont, France
- Party: Renaissance (2017–2022); Horizons (2022–present)
- Education: Aix-Marseille University

Bérangère Fabienne Maria Abba (French pronunciation: [beʁɑ̃ʒɛʁ aba]; born 22 October 1976) is a French politician who served as Secretary of State for Biodiversity in the government of Prime Minister Jean Castex from 2020 to 2022. As a member of Renaissance (RE), she previously represented the 1st constituency of the Haute-Marne department in the National Assembly from 2017 until 2020.

== Early career ==
The owner of a family lingerie shop, Abba was a municipal councillor of Chaumont from 2014 to 2017. In the 2015 departmental election, she ran in the canton of Chaumont-2 as a miscellaneous right candidate, but failed to qualify for the second round.

== Political career ==
Abba was elected to the National Assembly in Haute-Marne's 1st constituency in 2017 with 53.4% of the second-round vote for La République En Marche! (later Renaissance). In Parliament, she served on the Committee on Laws from 2017 until 2020. In addition to her committee assignments, she was part of the French-Haitian Parliamentary Friendship Group.

On 26 July 2020, Abba was appointed as Secretary of State for Biodiversity at the Ministry for the Ecological Transition under Minister Barbara Pompili. She left the government on 20 May 2022.

In the 2022 legislative election, this time running for Horizons, she lost her seat to Christophe Bentz of VIA, the Way of the People (supported by the National Rally), with 48.7% of the second-round vote.

Abba was a candidate on the Ensemble list led by Valérie Hayer in the 2024 European election but failed to obtain a seat in the European Parliament, as she was placed 17th. In the 2024 snap legislative election, she ran again in Haute-Marne's 1st constituency, losing again to Bentz with 46.1% of the second-round vote.

== Political positions ==
In May 2018, Abba co-sponsored an initiative in favour of legalising assisted reproductive technology (ART) for all women (singles, heterosexual couples or lesbian couples). In September 2018, following the appointment of François de Rugy to the government, Abba supported the candidacy of Barbara Pompili for president of the National Assembly.

== Honours ==
- Knight of the Legion of Honour (2025)

== See also ==
- List of MPs who lost their seat in the 2022 French legislative election
