= Guillaume Guérin (politician) =

French politician (born 1987)

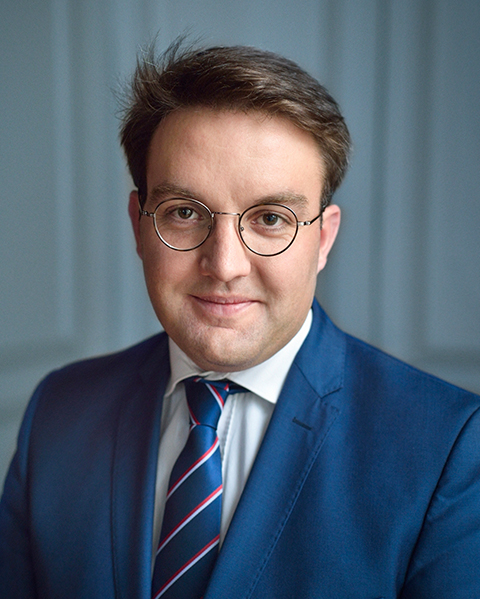
- Guérin in 2019

Mayor of Limoges
- Incumbent
- Assumed office 27 March 2026
- Preceded by: Émile-Roger Lombertie

Personal details
- Born: 4 May 1987 (age 39) Limoges, France
- Party: New Energy (since 2026)
- Other political affiliations: The Republicans (2015–present); Union for a Popular Movement (2004–2015)

Guillaume Guérin (born 4 May 1987) is a French politician serving as mayor of Limoges since 2026.

== Early life and career ==
Guérin was born in Limoges in 1987 and joined the Union for a Popular Movement in 2004. In 2013, he was elected leader of the party in Haute-Vienne. He was appointed first deputy mayor of Limoges in 2014, and became a member of the Regional Council of Limousin the same year. He was elected member of the Regional Council of Nouvelle-Aquitaine in 2015 and succeeded Virginie Calmels as group leader of The Republicans in 2019.

In 2018, Guérin was appointed minister of rurality in the shadow cabinet of Laurent Wauquiez. In the 2014 European Parliament election, he was a candidate for member of the European Parliament in 7th position on the Union for a Popular Movement's party list in Massif-central–Centre. In the 2019 election, he was in 17th position on The Republicans' nationwide list. He is in a relationship with a niece of François Baroin.

During the 2026 French student protests, the Hôtel de Ville or city hall of Limoges was burned down. Guérin said that he would resign unless the French government paid for its reconstruction. Prime minister Sébastien Lecornu responded that the state would pay for the reconstruction and the preservation of local services.
