= Shadow Cabinet of France =

Shadow Cabinet

In France, although the formation of a shadow cabinet (French: contre-gouvernement) is neither compulsory nor common, several have been formed.

== 2013 Shadow Cabinet ==
Jean-Louis Borloo announces the creation of shadow cabinet of the Union of Democrats and Independents. Its composition is made official on June 15, 2013 during the first national council of the party.

=== Small Team ===
- Coordinator: Yves Jégo
- Business and Growth: Hervé Morin
- Research, Innovation and Foresight: Nassimah Dindar
- Agriculture, Forestry and Agri-food: Yannick Favennec
- Social Affairs: Valérie Létard
- Work and Professional Integration: Sonia de La Provôté
- Territories and Sustainable Development: Bertrand Pancher
- Overseas and Sea: Sonia Lagarde
- Public Spending: Philippe Vigier
- Teaching and Youth: Rama Yade
- Culture, Communication and Digital: Catherine Morin-Desailly
- Interior: Jean-Christophe Lagarde
- Justice: François Zocchetto
- Defense and Veterans: Philippe Folliot
- Foreign Affairs and Global Public Goods: Chantal Jouanno
- European Integration: Jean Arthuis

=== Large team ===
- Tourism: Philippe Augier
- Women’s Rights: Sophie Auconie
- Africa and Francophonie: Jean-Marie Bockel
- Social Integration and Secularism: Zohra Bitan
- Communication and Media: Jean-Marie Cavada
- Trade and Crafts: Nathalie Colin-Oesterlé
- Sea, Fishing and Ocean: Jean-Yves de Chaisemartin
- Small and Medium-sized Enterprises: Nathalie Delattre
- Budget: Charles de Courson
- Civil Service: Marianne Duranton
- Transport: Stéphane Demilly
- City: Arlette Fructus
- Academic Success: Jean-Léonce Dupont
- Youth: Edith Gallois
- Higher Education: Laurent Hénart
- Local Authorities: Sylvie Goy-Chavent
- Crime Prevention: Grégoire Le Blond
- Disabled People: Sylvie Guignard
- Industry and Production: Maurice Leroy
- Elderly People: Hélène Hautval
- France’s Influence: Aymeri de Montesquiou
- Associative Life: Olga Johnson
- Housing: Michel Piron
- Professional Training: Fabienne Lévy
- Energy: Franck Reynier
- Solidarity Economy: Véronique Marchet
- Work and Employment: Arnaud Richard
- Family: Véronique Marendat
- Sports: François Rochebloine
- Food: Assia Meddah
- Equal Opportunities: Aziz Senni
- Greater Paris and Metropolises: Dorothée Pineau
- Apprenticeship and Youth Employment: Patrick Toulmet
- Prison Conditions: Christine Robin
- Foreign Trade: Michel Zumkeller
- Consumption: Sylvie Smaniotto
- Participatory Democracy: Christine de Veyrac

== 2018 Shadow Cabinet ==
On 21 November 2018, Laurent Wauquiez, president of The Republicans, the largest opposition party in Parliament, announced the formation of a shadow cabinet:

- Foreign Affairs: Pascal Allizard
- Equality Women-Men and Fight Against Discriminations: Emmanuelle Anthoine
- Youth and Sports: Laurence Arribagé
- Housing: Thibault Bazin
- Liberal Professions: Valérie Bazin-Malgras
- Family: Valérie Beauvais
- Tourism: Émilie Bonnivard
- Policy of the City: Ian Boucard
- Justice: François-Noël Buffet
- Interior: Éric Ciotti
- Labour and Training: Pierre Cordier
- Spatial and Mountain Planning: Marie-Christine Dalloz
- Immigration: Pierre-Henri Dumont
- Agriculture: Laurent Duplomb
- Trade and Craft: Pascale Gruny
- Rurality: Guillaume Guérin
- Education: Patrick Hetzel
- Health: Philippe Juvin
- Culture: Brigitte Kuster
- Local Collectivities: Nicolas Lacroix
- Transports: Valérie Lacroute
- European Affairs: Constance Le Grip
- Overseas: David Lorion
- Public Finance: Véronique Louwagie
- Industry: Olivier Marleix
- Defence: Philippe Meunier
- Digital Economy: Christelle Morançais
- Intergenerational link and Older age: Sylviane Noël
- Cooperation and Development: Bérengère Poletti
- Disability: Aurélien Pradié
- Employment: Frédérique Puissat
- Ecology and Sustainable Development: Martial Saddier
- Higher Education: Antoine Savignat
- Energy: Raphaël Schellenberger

== 2023 Shadow Cabinet ==
On May 14, 2023, Éric Ciotti announced the composition of his shadow cabinet:

- Coordinator: Annie Genevard
- Foreign Affairs and Europe: Michel Barnier
- Women's Rights: Nelly Garnier
- Youth, Sports and the Olympic Games: Virginie Duby-Muller
- Accommodation: Dominique Estrosi Sassone
- Family: Valérie Boyer
- Tourism: Émilie Bonnivard
- Economy and Reindustrialization: Christian Saint-Étienne
- Justice: François-Noël Buffet
- Interior: Frédéric Péchenard
- Social Affairs, Disability and Work: Philippe Juvin
- Regional Planning: Guillaume Guérin
- Immigration: Nadine Morano
- Agriculture and Food Sovereignty: Julien Dive
- Trade and Crafts: Nicolas Forissier
- Rurality: Christine Bonfanti-Dossat
- Education: Max Brisson
- Health: Yannick Neuder
- Culture and Francophonie: Florence Portelli
- Local Authorities: Brigitte Barèges
- Transport: Philippe Tabarot
- Prison System: Muriel Jourda
- Overseas: Mansour Kamardine
- Public Accounts: Véronique Louwagie
- Companies: Valérie Bazin-Malgras
- Defense: Jean-Louis Thiériot
- Digital and Artificial Intelligence: Alexandra Borchio-Fontimp
- Civil Security: Françoise Dumont
- Training and Learning: Isabelle Périgault
- Identity, Secularism and Republican Values: Jacqueline Eustache-Brinio
- Waters and Forests: Nicolas Lacroix
- Environment: Antoine Vermorel-Marques
- Higher Education and Research: Patrick Hetzel
- Energy: Raphaël Schellenberger
- City: Pierre Oliver
