= Haute-Marne's 2nd constituency =

Constituency of the National Assembly of France

2nd constituency of the Haute-Marne
- inline Constituency of the National Assembly of France

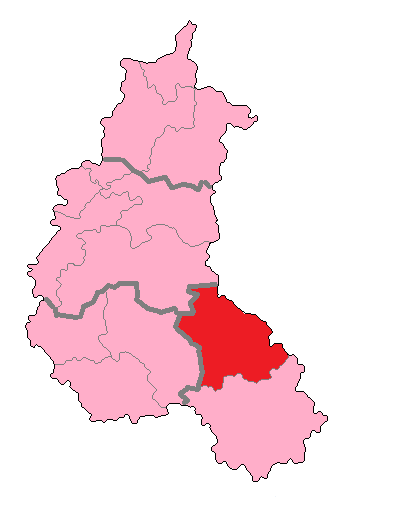
- Haute-Marne's 2nd Constituency shown within Champagne-Ardenne
- Deputy: Laurence Robert-Dehault; RN
- Department: Haute-Marne
- Cantons: Andelot-Blancheville, Blaiserives, Chevillon, Doulaincourt-Saucourt, Joinville, Juzennecourt, Montier-en-Der, Poissons, Saint-Blin-Semilly, Saint-Dizier Centre, Saint-Dizier Nord-Est, Saint-Dizier Ouest, Saint-Dizier Sud-Est, Vignory, Wassy.
- Registered voters: 64,327

The 2nd constituency of the Haute-Marne is a French legislative constituency in the Haute-Marne département.

== Description ==
The 2nd constituency in Haute-Marne covers the northern part of the department including Saint-Dizier its largest town. It also includes Colombey-les-Deux-Eglises, the home and final resting place of Charles de Gaulle.

The seat was held by François Cornut-Gentille for 29 years, between 1993 and 2022, when he lost the seat to RN's Laurence Robert-Dehault.

== Historic Representation ==
Election	Member	Party
1986	Proportional representation – no election by constituency	
1988	Guy Chanfrault	PS
1993	François Cornut-Gentille	RPR
1997	François Cornut-Gentille	RPR
2002	François Cornut-Gentille	UMP
2007	François Cornut-Gentille	UMP
2012	François Cornut-Gentille	UMP
2017	François Cornut-Gentille	LR
2022	Laurence Robert-Dehault	RN

== Election results ==
=== 2024 ===
Candidate	Party	Alliance		
Candidate	Party	Alliance	Votes	%
Laurence Robert-Dehault	RN		21,009	56.82
Nicolas Lacroix	LR		10,407	28.15
Ingrid Viot	LFI	NFP	4,876	13.19
Justin Prum	LO		684	1.85
Valid votes			36,976	97.12
Blank votes			670	1.76
Null votes			426	1.12
Turnout			51,738	63.19
Abstentions			20,971	35.52
Registered voters			59,043	
Result			RN HOLD	

=== 2022 ===
Legislative Election 2022: Haute-Marne's 2nd constituency
Party	Candidate	Votes	%	±%
RN	Laurence Robert-Dehault	10,928	39.60	+10.54
LR (UDC)	François Cornut-Gentille	7,686	27.85	-5.96
LFI (NUPÉS)	Ingrid Viot	3,438	12.46	−2.11
LREM (Ensemble)	Déborah Daval	3,122	11.31	−9.88
DVD	Philippe Novac	1,069	3.87	N/A
REC	Anne Lettrée	663	2.40	N/A
Others	N/A	687	-	−
Turnout		27,593	47.32	−0.72
2nd round result
RN	Laurence Robert-Dehault	13,877	51.70	+13.51
LR (UDC)	François Cornut-Gentille	12,963	48.30	−13.51
Turnout		26,840	47.11	+2.00
RN gain from LR				

=== 2017 ===
Candidate	Label	First round		Second round	
Candidate	Label	Votes	%	Votes	%
François Cornut-Gentille	LR	9,808	33.81	16,027	61.81
Frédéric Fabre	FN	8,431	29.06	9,901	38.19
Vincent Berthet	REM	6,148	21.19		
Daniel Monnier	FI	2,380	8.20		
Antoine Desfretier	PS	966	3.33		
Valérie Roffidal	ECO	466	1.61		
Édouard Gonzalez	PCF	414	1.43		
Anne Halin	EXG	214	0.74		
Laurence Olivier	DIV	183	0.63		
Votes		29,010	100.00	25,928	100.00
Valid votes		29,010	98.02	25,928	93.32
Blank votes		441	1.49	1,344	4.84
Null votes		145	0.49	511	1.84
Turnout		29,596	48.04	27,783	45.11
Abstentions		32,008	51.96	33,811	54.89
Registered voters		61,604		61,594	
Source: Ministry of the Interior

=== 2012 ===
Legislative Election 2012: Haute-Marne's 2nd constituency
Party	Candidate	Votes	%	±%
UMP	François Cornut-Gentille	16,724	45.67	
PS	Denis Maillot	10,477	28.61	
FN	Paul-Marie Coûteaux	6,957	19.00	
FG	Daniel Monnier	1,404	3.83	
Others	N/A	1,059		
Turnout		36,621	56.93	
2nd round result
UMP	François Cornut-Gentille	20,922	60.98	
PS	Denis Maillot	13,390	39.02	
Turnout		34,312	53.34	
UMP hold				
