= Aube's 2nd constituency =

Constituency of the National Assembly of France

2nd constituency of Aube
- inline Constituency of the National Assembly of France

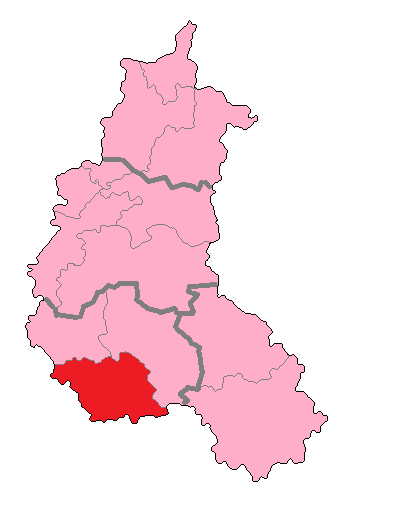
- Aube's 2nd Constituency shown within Champagne-Ardenne
- Deputy: Valérie Bazin-Malgras; LR
- Department: Aube
- Cantons: Aix-en-Othe, Bar-sur-Seine, Bouilly, Chaource, Ervy-le-Châtel, Estissac, Lusigny-sur-Barse, Mussy-sur-Seine, Les Riceys, Troyes-V, Troyes-VI, Troyes-VII.
- Registered voters: 72,910

The 2nd constituency of Aube is a French legislative constituency in the Aube département. It is currently represented by Valérie Bazin-Malgras of the LR.

== Description ==
It is located in the south of the department, and takes in part of the town of Troyes.

== Historic Representation ==
Election	Member	Party
1958	Henri Terré	CNIP
1962	Henri Terré	RI
1967	Bernard Pieds	DVG
1968	Robert Galley	UDR
1973	Robert Galley	UDR
1978	Robert Galley	RPR
1986	Proportional representation – no election by constituency	
1988	Robert Galley	RPR
1993	Robert Galley	RPR
1997	Robert Galley	RPR
2002	Jean-Claude Mathis	UMP
2007	Jean-Claude Mathis	UMP
2012	Jean-Claude Mathis	UMP
2017	Valérie Bazin-Malgras	LR
2022	Valérie Bazin-Malgras	LR
2024	Valérie Bazin-Malgras	LR

== Election results ==
=== 2024 ===
Candidate	Party	Alliance	First round		Second round	
Candidate	Party	Alliance	Votes	%	Votes	%
Valérie Bazin-Malgras	LR	UDC	13,902	27.93	25,420	52.17
Albéric Ferrand	RN		22,316	44.83	23,306	47.83
Samira Sebbari	DVG	NFP	8,256	16.58		
Romain Vallée	LO		603	1.21		
Salomé Fontaine-Garcia	MoDEM	Ensemble	4,703	9.45		
Valid votes			49,780	98.72	48,726	96.94
Blank votes			708	1.39	1,152	2.29
Null votes			451	0.89	385	0.77
Turnout			50,939	68.86	50,263	67.94
Abstentions			23,037	31.14	23,714	32.06
Registered voters			73,976		73,977	
Result			LR HOLD			

=== 2022 ===
Legislative Election 2022: Aube's 2nd constituency
Party	Candidate	Votes	%	±%
LR (UDC)	Valérie Bazin-Malgras	10,426	28.57	+4.38
RN	Evelyne Henry	9,990	27.38	+5.64
LFI (NUPÉS)	Sarah Fraincart	6,165	16.90	+2.64
MoDem (Ensemble)	Salomé Fontaine-Garcia	6,130	16.80	−13.62
REC	Etienne Ignatovitch	1,695	4.65	N/A
Others	N/A	2,083	-	−
Turnout		36,489	49.39	−1.60
2nd round result
LR (UDC)	Valérie Bazin-Malgras	19,731	59.51	+4.21
RN	Evelyne Henry	13,426	40.49	N/A
Turnout		33,157	46.67	+1.43
LR hold				

=== 2017 ===
Candidate	Label	First round		Second round	
Candidate	Label	Votes	%	Votes	%
Djamila Haddad	REM	11,251	30.42	13,340	44.70
Valérie Bazin-Malgras	LR	8,947	24.19	16,501	55.30
Jean-Christophe Lefèvre	FN	8,041	21.74		
Élise Gehin	FI	2,829	7.65		
Sybille Bertail	DVD	2,410	6.52		
Virgil Hennequin	PS	976	2.64		
Benjamin Birène	ECO	903	2.44		
Gisèle Malaval	PCF	566	1.53		
Frédéric Fays	DIV	317	0.86		
Olivier Tamario	DIV	222	0.60		
Françoise Jouve	DIV	193	0.52		
Julien Cynober	EXG	177	0.48		
Patricia Peyraud	DVG	159	0.43		
Votes		36,991	100.00	29,841	100.00
Valid votes		36,991	98.20	29,841	89.28
Blank votes		472	1.25	2,560	7.66
Null votes		207	0.55	1,024	3.06
Turnout		37,670	50.99	33,425	45.24
Abstentions		36,203	49.01	40,455	54.76
Registered voters		73,873		73,880	
Source: Ministry of the Interior

=== 2012 ===
Summary of the 10 June and 17 June 2012 French legislative in Aube’s 2nd Constituency election results
Candidate	Party		1st round		2nd round	
Candidate	Party		Votes	%	Votes	%
Jean-Claude Mathis	Union for a Popular Movement	UMP	16,608	38.55%	23,361	57.24%
Yves Fournier	Socialist Party	PS	12,986	30.15%	17,453	42.76%
Gérard Cianni	National Front	FN	8,700	20.20%		
Jean-Pierre Cornevin	Left Front	FG	2,084	4.84%		
Karima Ouadah		CEN	621	1.44%		
Claudine François-Wilser	Ecologist	ECO	481	1.12%		
Sébastien Fournillon	Miscellaneous Right	DVD	444	1.03%		
Michèle Roux	Ecologist	ECO	366	0.85%		
Claudia Martins Amado	Miscellaneous Right	DVD	363	0.84%		
Marie-Pierre Marc	Far Left	EXG	291	0.68%		
Bernard Waymel	Miscellaneous Right	DVD	133	0.31%		
Total			43,077	100%	40,814	100%
Registered voters			72,912		72,910	
Blank/Void ballots			731	1.67%	1,859	4.36%
Turnout			43,808	60.08%	42,673	58.53%
Abstentions			29,104	39.92%	30,237	41.47%
Result					UMP HOLD	

=== 2007 ===
Summary of the 10 June and 17 June 2007 French legislative in Aube’s 2nd Constituency election results
Candidate	Party		1st round		2nd round	
Candidate	Party		Votes	%	Votes	%
Jean-Claude Mathis	Union for a Popular Movement	UMP	20,110	47.59%	25,032	65.26%
Saliha Ayadi	Radical Party of the Left	PRG	6,680	15.81%	13,324	34.74%
Didier Leprince	Miscellaneous Right	DVD	3,488	8.25%		
Marc Malarmey	National Front	FN	3,353	7.93%		
Elisabeth Gariglio	Democratic Movement	MoDem	2,515	5.95%		
Jean-Pierre Cornevin	Communist	COM	1,963	4.65%		
Hervé Murgier	The Greens	VEC	1,408	3.33%		
Jean Vivet	Movement for France	MPF	884	2.09%		
Déolinda Cardoso	Far Left	EXG	612	1.42%		
Anne Baicry	Ecologist	ECO	567	1.34%		
Denise Normant	Divers	DIV	361	0.85%		
Anne-Marie le Cadre	Far Left	EXG	316	0.75%		
Total			42,257	100%	38,356	100%
Registered voters			73,373		73,367	
Blank/Void ballots			814	1.89%	1,908	4.74%
Turnout			43,071	58.70%	40,264	54.88%
Abstentions			30,302	41.30%	33,103	45.12%
Result					UMP HOLD	

=== 2002 ===
Legislative Election 2002: Aube's 2nd constituency
Party	Candidate	Votes	%	±%
UMP	Jean-Claude Mathis	15,291	35.34	+12.79
PS	Yves Fournier	11,400	26.35	+2.53
FN	Marc Malarmey	7,542	17.43	−2.86
UDF	Alain Deroin	4,395	10.16	−2.54
PCF	Jean-Pierre Cornevin	1,495	3.45	−3.81
LO	Annie Cousin	904	2.09	−1.11
Others	N/A	2,244		
Turnout		44,159	64.15	
2nd round result
UMP	Jean-Claude Mathis	22,760	58.45	+16.22
PS	Yves Fournier	16,179	41.55	−0.30
Turnout		40,918	59.45	
UMP hold				

=== 1997 ===
Legislative Election 1997: Aube's 2nd constituency
Party	Candidate	Votes	%	±%
PS	Yves Fournier	10,249	23.82	
RPR	Robert Galley	9,703	22.55	
FN	Marc Malarmey	8,732	20.29	
UDF	Alain Deroin	5,464	12.70	
PCF	Jean-Pierre Cornevin	3,124	7.26	
LV	Marc Thillerot	1,791	4.16	
DVD	Raymond Karl	1,575	3.66	
LO	Annie Cousin	1,376	3.20	
MEI	Claudette Cella	1,012	2.35	
Turnout		45,321	68.15	
2nd round result
RPR	Robert Galley	20,110	42.23	
PS	Yves Fournier	19,929	41.85	
FN	Marc Malarmey	7,581	15.92	
Turnout		49,481	74.41	
RPR hold				

== Sources ==
- French Interior Ministry results website: "Résultats électoraux officiels en France" (in French).
