= Aube's 3rd constituency =

Constituency of the National Assembly of France

3rd constituency of Aube
- inline Constituency of the National Assembly of France

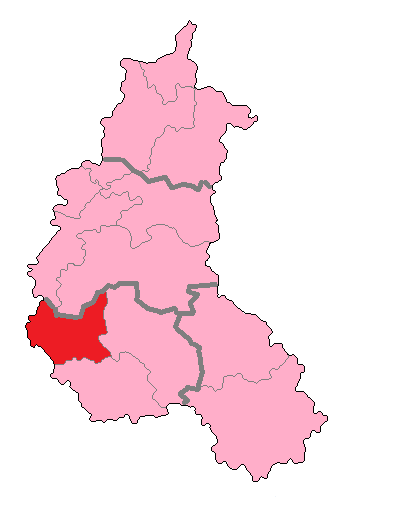
- Aube's 3rd Constituency shown within Champagne-Ardenne
- Deputy: Angélique Ranc; RN
- Department: Aube
- Cantons: La Chapelle-Saint-Luc, Marcilly-le-Hayer, Nogent-sur-Seine, Romilly-sur-Seine-I, Romilly-sur-Seine-II, Sainte-Savine, Troyes-III, Troyes-IV, Villenauxe-la-Grande
- Registered voters: 66,188

The 3rd constituency of Aube is a French legislative constituency in the Aube département. It is currently represented by Angélique Ranc of National Rally (RN).

== Description ==
It is located in the north west corner of the department, and takes in the town of Romilly-sur-Seine, and part of the town of Troyes.

== Historic Representation ==
Election	Member	Party
1958	Bernard Laurent	MRP
1962	Jean Durlot	UNR
1967	Paul Granet	UDR
1968	Paul Granet	UDR
1973	Paul Granet	UDR
1978	Paul Granet	UDF
1981	Michel Cartelet	PS
1986	Proportional representation – no election by constituency	
1988	Michel Cartelet	PS
1993	François Baroin	RPR
1995	Gérard Menuel (Note: substitute for François Baroin, who was appointed Minister, 19 June 1995)	RPR
1997	François Baroin	RPR
2002	François Baroin	UMP
2007	François Baroin	UMP
2012	François Baroin	UMP
2014	Gérard Menuel	UMP
2017	Gérard Menuel	LR
2022	Angélique Ranc	RN
2024	Angélique Ranc	RN

== Election results ==
=== 2024 ===
Candidate	Party	Alliance	First round		Second round	
Candidate	Party	Alliance	Votes	%	Votes	%
Angélique Ranc	RN		18,084	43.33	20,600	52.52
Olivier Girardin	PS	NFP	10,178	24.39	18,624	47.48
Luc Scherrer	REN	Ensemble	6,994	16.76		
Didier Leprince	LR	UDC	3,654	8.76		
Olivier Richard	DVD		1,502	3.60		
Pascal Andrieux	LO		349	0.84		
Nelly Collot-Touzé	ECO		970	2.32		
Valid votes			41,731	98.03	39,224	93.08
Blank votes			531	1.25	2,234	5.30
Null votes			309	0.73	682	1.62
Turnout			42,571	65.03	42,140	64.34
Abstentions			22,892	34.97	23,354	35.66
Registered voters			65,463		65,494	
Result			RN HOLD			

=== 2022 ===
Legislative Election 2022: Aube's 3rd constituency
Party	Candidate	Votes	%	±%
RN	Angélique Ranc	8,958	29.52	+8.22
LREM (Ensemble)	Loëtitia Beury	6,546	21.57	-10.81
LFI (NUPÉS)	Gaëtan Seffals	6,430	21.19	+5.32
LR (UDC)	Baptiste Gatouillat	4,507	14.85	−8.60
REC	Céline Lopes Vaz	1,318	4.34	N/A
DVE	Nelly Collot-Touzé	942	3.10	+1.12
Others	N/A	1,642	-	−
Turnout		30,343	46.58	−2.14
2nd round result
RN	Angélique Ranc	13,913	51.65	N/A
LREM (Ensemble)	Loëtitia Beury	13,024	48.35	+1.07
Turnout		26,937	43.93	+2.05
RN gain from LR				

=== 2017 ===
Candidate	Label	First round		Second round	
Candidate	Label	Votes	%	Votes	%
Pascal Landréat	MoDem	10,180	32.38	11,548	47.28
Gérard Menuel	LR	7,373	23.45	12,877	52.72
Angélique Ranc	FN	6,697	21.30		
Yves Bouteiller	FI	3,182	10.12		
David Blanchon	PS	1,184	3.77		
Nelly Collot-Touzé	ECO	624	1.98		
Arnaud Pacot	PCF	622	1.98		
Laurent Stocco	DLF	589	1.87		
Dominique Deharbe	DVG	423	1.35		
Chrystel Carte	DIV	295	0.94		
Pascal Andrieux	EXG	270	0.86		
Votes		31,439	100.00	24,425	100.00
Valid votes		31,439	98.29	24,425	88.84
Blank votes		399	1.25	2,066	7.51
Null votes		149	0.47	1,003	3.65
Turnout		31,987	48.72	27,494	41.88
Abstentions		33,673	51.28	38,159	58.12
Registered voters		65,660		65,653	
Source: Ministry of the Interior

=== 2014 by-election ===
Summary of the 7 and 14 December 2014 French legislative in Aube's 3rd Constituency
Candidate	Party		1st round		2nd round	
Candidate	Party		Votes	%	Votes	%
Gérard Menuel	Union for a Popular Movement	UMP	6,422	40.76%	10,527	63.85%
Bruno Subtil	National Front	FN	4,355	27.64%	5,960	36.15%
Olivier Girardin	Socialist Party	PS	2,315	14.69%		
Pierre Mathieu	Communist	COM	1,175	7.46%		
Maxime Beaulieu	Europe Ecology – The Greens	EELV	705	4.47%		
Dominique Deharbe	Miscellaneous Left	DVG	392	2.49%		
Nelly Collot-Touzet	Miscellaneous Right	DVD	315	2.00%		
Nicolas Rosseaux	Miscellaneous Right	DVD	76	0.48%		
Total			15,755	100%	16,486	100%
Registered voters			65,758		65,760	
Blank/Void ballots			440	0.67%	1,368	2.08%
Turnout			16,195	24.63%	17,854	27.15%
Abstentions			49,563	75.37%	47,906	72.85%
Result					UMP HOLD	

=== 2012 ===
Summary of the 10 and 17 June 2012 French legislative in Aube's 3rd Constituency election results
Candidate	Party		1st round		2nd round	
Candidate	Party		Votes	%	Votes	%
François Baroin	Union for a Popular Movement	UMP	15,677	41.42%	20,051	56.45%
Lorette Joly	Socialist Party	PS	10,899	28.79%	15,466	43.55%
Mireille Cazard	National Front	FN	6,733	17.79%		
Pierre Mathieu	Left Front	FG	2,718	7.18%		
Alain Carsenti		CEN	571	1.51%		
Dominique Deharbe	Miscellaneous Left	DVG	299	0.79%		
Véronique Guidat	Miscellaneous Right	DVD	268	0.71%		
Pierre Bissey	Far Left	EXG	231	0.61%		
Chislain Wysocinski	Ecologist	ECO	200	0.53%		
Sylvanie Kletty	Ecologist	ECO	169	0.45%		
Christian Bernaud	Far Left	EXG	86	0.23%		
Maurice Bernardie	Miscellaneous Left	DVG	0	0.00%		
Total			37,851	100%	35,517	100%
Registered voters			66,187		66,188	
Blank/Void ballots			397	1.04%	1,190	3.24%
Turnout			38,248	57.79%	36,707	55.46%
Abstentions			27,939	42.21%	29,481	44.54%
Result					UMP HOLD	

=== 2007 ===
Legislative Election 2007: Aube's 3rd
Party	Candidate	Votes	%	±%
UMP	François Baroin	23,281	55.71	
PS	Olivier Girardin	7,974	19.08	
FN	Martine Viala	3,148	7.53	
PCF	Pierre Mathieu	2,594	6.21	
LV	Françoise Delplanque	1,315	3.15	
LCR	Théodoulitsa Spagnol	871	2.08	
LO	Pierre Bissey	605	1.45	
MPF	Christian Parachout	585	1.40	
Independent	Lucien Maes	471	1.13	
MEI	Maurice Bernardie	459	1.10	
MNR	Guy Garnier	320	0.77	
Workers' Party	Christian Bernaud	168	0.40	
Turnout		42,565	57.25	
UMP hold		Swing		

=== 2002 ===
Legislative Election 2007: Aube's 3rd constituency
Party	Candidate	Votes	%	±%
UMP	François Baroin	21,201	49.03	+15.04
LV	Francoise Delplanque	8,223	19.02	+15.87
FN	Isabelle Maintenant	7,621	17.63	−2.63
PCF	Joe Triche	2,881	6.66	−3.40
LO	Pierre Bissey	956	2.21	−0.71
Others	N/A	2,355		
Turnout		44,024	63.02	
2nd round result
UMP	François Baroin	23,467	62.98	−3.98
LV	Francoise Delplanque	13,795	37.02	N/A
Turnout		39,148	56.04	
UMP hold				

=== 1997 ===
Legislative Election 1997: Aube's 3rd constituency
Party	Candidate	Votes	%	±%
RPR	François Baroin	15,149	33.99	
FN	Jean-Pierre Constant	9,030	20.26	
PS	Chantal Dujancourt	7,563	16.97	
PCF	Pierre Mathieu	4,486	10.06	
PRG	Michel Cartelet	3,157	7.08	
LV	Philippe Billet	1,405	3.15	
LO	Pierre Bissey	1,301	2.92	
MPF	Anne-Marie Goussard	1,088	2.44	
Others	N/A	1,394		
Turnout		46,622	67.61	
2nd round result
RPR	François Baroin	25,133	66.96	
FN	Jean-Pierre Constant	12,403	33.04	
Turnout		46,226	67.05	
RPR hold				

== Sources ==
- French Interior Ministry results website: "Résultats électoraux officiels en France" (in French).
