= François Cornut-Gentille =

French politician (born 1958)

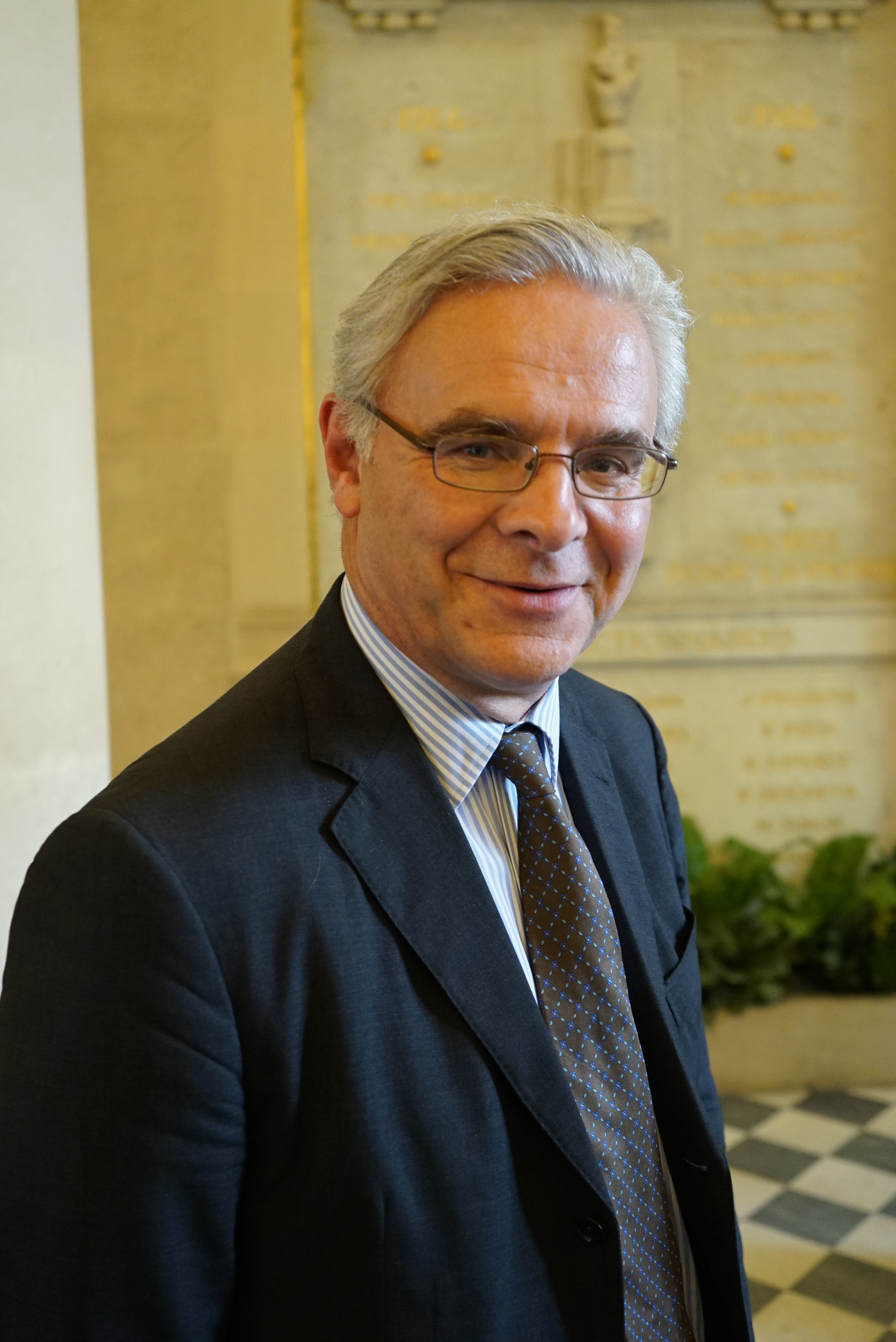
- Cornut-Gentille in 2017

Member of the National Assembly for Haute-Marne's 2nd constituency
- In office 2 April 1993 – 21 June 2022
- Preceded by: Guy Chanfrault
- Succeeded by: Laurence Robert-Dehault

Mayor of Saint-Dizier
- In office 19 June 1995 – 8 July 2017
- Preceded by: Guy Chanfrault
- Succeeded by: Élisabeth Robert-Dehault

Personal details
- Born: 22 May 1958 (age 68) Saint-Mandé, France
- Party: Rally for the Republic (until 2002); Union for a Popular Movement (2002–2015); The Republicans (2015–present)
- Relatives: Bernard Cornut-Gentille (uncle)
- Education: Paris Nanterre University

François Cornut-Gentille (French pronunciation: [fʁɑ̃swa kɔʁny ʒɑ̃tij]; born 22 May 1958) is a French politician who represented the 2nd constituency of the Haute-Marne department in the National Assembly from 1993 to 2022. A member of The Republicans (LR), he was appointed the defence adviser to Prime Minister Michel Barnier in 2024.

== Political career ==
Cornut-Gentille is a nephew of civil servant and politician Bernard Cornut-Gentille (1909–1992), who served as a government minister under both the Fourth and Fifth Republic, France's ambassador to the United Nations, as well as Mayor of Cannes.

He was first elected to the National Assembly in the 2nd constituency of Haute-Marne in the 1993 legislative election as a member of the Rally for the Republic, defeating Guy Chanfrault of the Socialist Party, whom he also succeeded as Mayor of Saint-Dizier in 1995. He held the mayorship of Saint-Dizier until his resignation in 2017, but continued to serve in its municipal council, to which he was first elected in 1989, being reelected in 2020.

In the 2007 legislative election, Cornut-Gentille was reelected to a fourth term in the first round, with 56.3% of the vote.

In Parliament, he served on several committees: the Production and Exchanges Committee (1993–1997), Cultural, Familial and Social Affairs Committee (1993, 1997–2000), Defence and Armed Forces Committee (2000–2004, 2007–2012) and Finance, General Economy and Budgetary Control Committee (2004–2007, 2012–2022). From the 2017 election, he served as one of the eleven deputy chairpersons of The Republicans' parliamentary group, under the leadership of chairman Christian Jacob.

In the 2022 legislative election, he was defeated by National Rally candidate Laurence Robert-Dehault, earning 48.3% of the second-round vote.

In 2024, he was appointed the defence adviser to newly-appointed Prime Minister Michel Barnier.

== Political positions ==
In The Republicans' 2016 presidential primaries, Cornut-Gentille endorsed Alain Juppé as the party's candidate for President of France. In The Republicans' 2017 leadership election, he endorsed Laurent Wauquiez. Ahead of the 2022 presidential election, he publicly declared his support for Michel Barnier as the party's candidate at the 2021 The Republicans congress.

== See also ==
- List of MPs who lost their seat in the 2022 French legislative election
