= Cantons of the Haute-Marne department =

The following is a list of the 17 cantons of the Haute-Marne department, in France, following the French canton reorganisation which came into effect in March 2015:

- Bologne
- Bourbonne-les-Bains
- Chalindrey
- Châteauvillain
- Chaumont-1
- Chaumont-2
- Chaumont-3
- Eurville-Bienville
- Joinville
- Langres
- Nogent
- Poissons
- Saint-Dizier-1
- Saint-Dizier-2
- Saint-Dizier-3
- Villegusien-le-Lac
- Wassy
