= Valérie Bazin-Malgras =

French politician

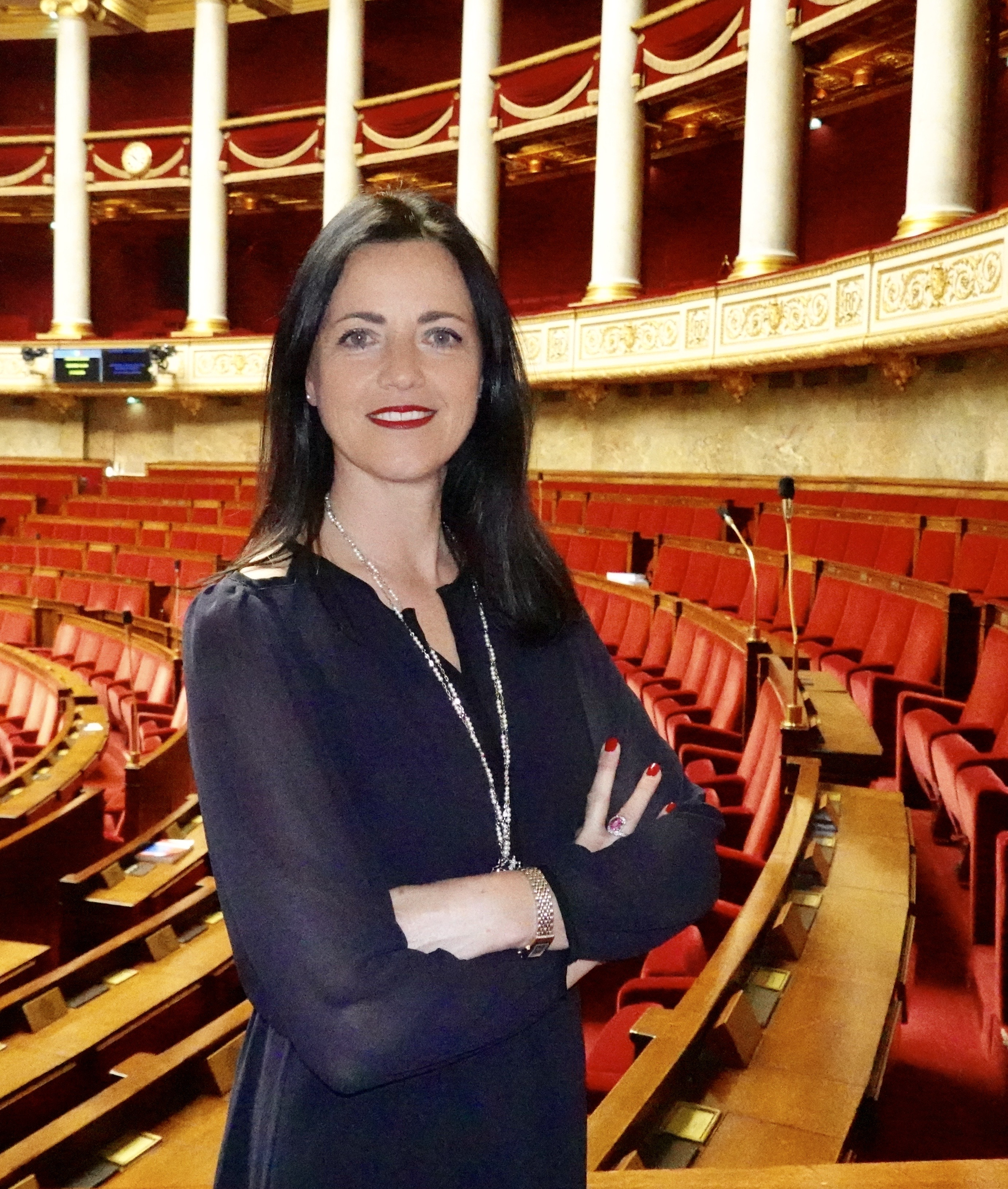
- Valérie Bazin-Malgras in 2020

Member of the National Assembly for Aube's 2nd constituency
- Incumbent
- Assumed office 21 June 2017
- Preceded by: Jean-Claude Mathis

Municipal councillor of Troyes
- Incumbent
- Assumed office 30 March 2014
- Mayor: François Baroin

Personal details
- Born: 31 October 1969 (age 56) Romilly-sur-Seine, France
- Party: The Republicans

Valérie Bazin-Malgras (born 31 October 1969) is a French politician of the Republicans (LR) who has been serving as a member of the French National Assembly since 2017, representing Aube's 2nd constituency.

== Early life ==
For more than 20 years, she managed the Villeroy & Boch company stores in Troyes. In this position, she became France director of factory outlets for Villeroy and Boch in 2003 and President of the Association of Traders of Brands Avenue Troyes.

== Political career ==
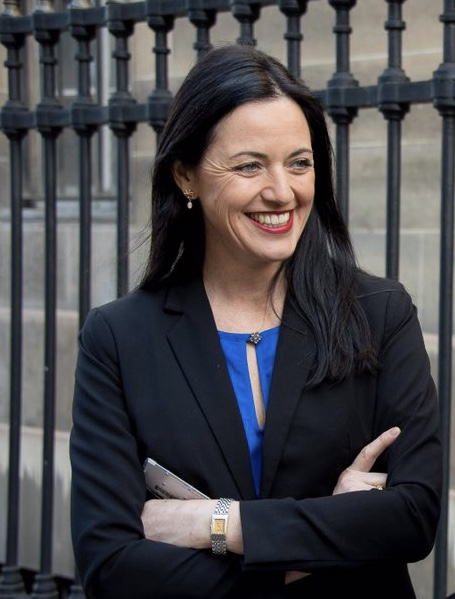
Valérie Bazin-Malgras in March 2018.

In Parliament, Bazin-Malgras serves on the Committee on Cultural Affairs and Education. In addition to her committee assignments, she is part of the French-Singaporean Parliamentary Friendship Group.

Since 2019, Bazin-Malgras has been serving as deputy chairperson of the Republicans, under the leadership of chair Christian Jacob.

In the run-up to the Republicans’ 2022 convention, Bazin-Malgras endorsed Aurélien Pradié as the party’s chairman; instead, Éric Ciotti won the vote. In 2023, Ciotti appointed her as member of his shadow cabinet and put her in charge of the party's positions on businesses.

== See also ==
- 2017 French legislative election
