= Arrondissements of the Haute-Marne department =

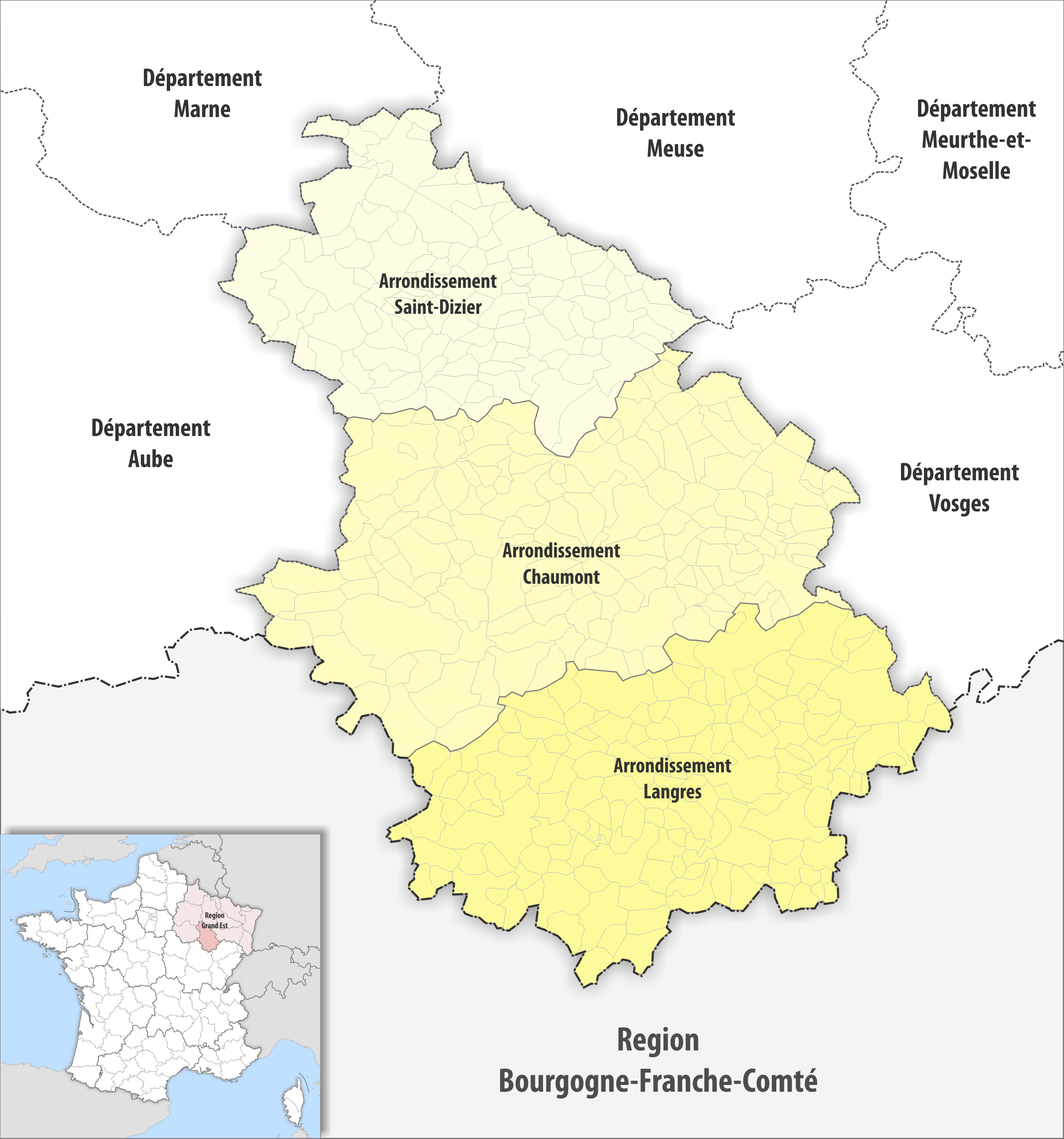
Map of arrondissements of the Haute-Marne department.

The 3 arrondissements of the Haute-Marne department are:

- Arrondissement of Chaumont (prefecture of the Haute-Marne department: Chaumont) with 158 communes. The population of the arrondissement was 61,835 in 2021.
- Arrondissement of Langres (subprefecture: Langres) with 157 communes. The population of the arrondissement was 42,678 in 2021.
- Arrondissement of Saint-Dizier (subprefecture: Saint-Dizier) with 111 communes. The population of the arrondissement was 66,529 in 2021.

== History ==
In 1800 the arrondissements of Chaumont, Langres and Wassy were established. The arrondissement of Wassy was disbanded in 1926. It was restored in 1940, but the subprefecture was moved to Saint-Dizier.
