= Gérard Menuel =

French politician (born 1952)

- Parliamentary group: The Republicans

Deputy for Aube's 3rd constituency in the National Assembly of France
- In office 14 December 2014 – 21 June 2022
- Preceded by: François Baroin
- Succeeded by: Angélique Ranc
- In office 23 April 2010 – 16 June 2012
- Preceded by: François Baroin
- Succeeded by: François Baroin
- In office 3 July 2005 – 19 June 2007
- Preceded by: François Baroin
- Succeeded by: François Baroin
- In office 19 June 1995 – 21 April 1997
- Preceded by: François Baroin
- Succeeded by: François Baroin

Personal details
- Born: 7 May 1952 (age 73) Jasseines

Gérard Menuel (born 7 May 1952, in Jasseines) is a French politician of the Republicans (LR). He was elected Member of Parliament in the French National Assembly in a special election on 14 December 2014, representing Aube's 3rd constituency. He was re-elected in 2017. He had served in the National Assembly as a replacement Deputy on three occasions from 1995 to 2012.

Ahead of the 2022 presidential elections, Menuel publicly declared his support for Michel Barnier as the Republicans’ candidate. He announced on 12 February 2022 that he would not seek re-election in the 2022 election.

== Biography ==
A farmer by profession, he held numerous positions of responsibility in local, departmental, regional, and then national agricultural unions. He was first vice president and then secretary general of the CDJA (Young Farmers' Union) of Aube. In 1985, he became president of the FDSEA in the same department before taking up the position of president of the Aube Chamber of Agriculture in 1992.

His meeting with François Baroin steered his career towards positions directly related to politics. As François Baroin's deputy, he served for the third time in the National Assembly, replacing Baroin when he was appointed Minister of the Budget, Public Accounts, and State Reform. A representative for the Aube's 3rd constituency until June 2012, he is a member of the UMP.

He is involved in efforts to help families searching for the twenty soldiers who were taken prisoner in Algeria in the Sidi Abdelli and not returned to France, contrary to what was stipulated in the Évian Accords.

He was elected deputy for the first time on December 14, 2014, after winning the second round of the legislative by-election against National Rally candidate Bruno Subtil with 63.85% of the vote.

He initially supported François Fillon in the 2016 Republican presidential primary. However, he ultimately endorsed Nicolas Sarkozy.

In the 2017 legislative elections, he was re-elected as a representative in the second round, with 52.72% of the vote.

In 2022, at the age of 69, he did not run for another term.

== See also ==
- 2017 French legislative election
