= Angélique Ranc =

French politician

Member of the National Assembly for Aube's 3rd constituency
- In office 22 June 2022 – 9 June 2024
- Preceded by: Gérard Menuel

Personal details
- Born: 16 March 1988 (age 38) France
- Party: National Rally

Angélique Ranc (born 16 March 1988) is a French politician of the National Rally and a member of the National Assembly for Aube's 3rd constituency since 2022.

Ranc worked in banking before taking an interest in politics through her husband who is a member and activist for the National Rally.

On 13 December 2015 she was elected regional councilor in Alsace-Champagne-Ardenne-Lorraine and re-elected on 27 June 2021. During the 2017 French legislative election she contested the seat of Aube's 3rd constituency but was eliminated in the first round. She contested the constituency again at the 2022 French legislative election and was successful at winning it.
