= Haute-Marne's 1st constituency =

Constituency of the National Assembly of France

1st constituency of the Haute-Marne
- inline Constituency of the National Assembly of France

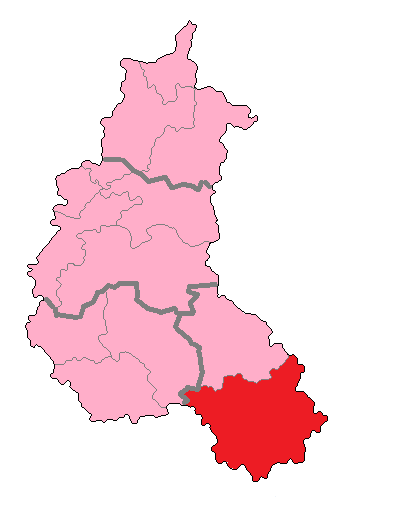
- Haute-Marne's 1st Constituency shown within Champagne-Ardenne
- Deputy: Christophe Bentz; RN
- Department: Haute-Marne
- Cantons: Arc-en-Barrois, Auberive, Bourbonne-les-Bains, Bourmont, Châteauvillain, Chaumont-Nord, Chaumont-Sud, Clefmont, Fayl-la-Forêt, Laferté-sur-Amance, Langres, Longeau-Percey, Neuilly-l'Évêque, Nogent, Prauthoy, Terre-Natale, Val-de-Meuse.
- Registered voters: 74,519

The 1st constituency of the Haute-Marne is a French legislative constituency in the Haute-Marne département.

== Description ==
Haute-Marne's 1st constituency covers the southern portion of the department and includes the prefecture of Chaumont.

Despite being won by the left at the 1997 election the seat was comfortably held by Luc Chatel of the UMP from 2002 to 2017.

== Historic Representation ==
Election	Member	Party
1986	Proportional representation – no election by constituency	
1988	Charles Fèvre	UDF
1993	Charles Fèvre	UDF
1997	Jean-Claude Daniel	DVG
2002	Luc-Marie Chatel	UMP
2007	Luc-Marie Chatel	UMP
2012	Luc-Marie Chatel	UMP
2017	Bérangère Abba	LREM
2020	Sylvain Templier	LREM
2022	Christophe Bentz	RN

== Election results ==
=== 2024 ===
Candidate	Party	Alliance	First round		Second round	
Candidate	Party	Alliance	Votes	%	Votes	%
Christophe Bentz	RN		22,815	48.83	23,772	53.90
Bérangère Abba	HOR	Ensemble	12,529	28.05	20,335	46.10
Benjamin Lambert	PS	NPF	9,104	20.38		
Sylvain Demay	LO		869	1.95		
Baptiste Gallet	DIV		355	0.79		
Valid votes			44,672	95.88	44,107	94.31
Blank votes			1,159	2.49	1,847	3.95
Null votes			763	1.64	814	1.74
Turnout			46,594	67.36	46,768	67.61
Abstentions			22,577	32.64	22,405	32.39
Registered voters			69,171		69,173	
Result			RN HOLD			

=== 2022 ===
Legislative Election 2022: Haute-Marne's 1st constituency
Party	Candidate	Votes	%	±%
RN	Christophe Bentz	9,479	27.31	+8.48
HOR (Ensemble)	Bérangère Abba	7,342	21.15	-10.75
LFI (NUPÉS)	Michèle Leclerc	5,622	16.20	−3.86
LR (UDC)	Sophie Delong	4,660	13.42	−5.64
DIV	Théo Caviezel	3,635	10.47	N/A
DVD	Jocelyne Leblanc-Gabriel	1,466	4.22	N/A
REC	Bénédicte de Dinechin	964	2.78	N/A
DVG	Eloïse Venancio	752	2.17	N/A
Others	N/A	794	-	−
Turnout		34,714	50.61	−0.70
2nd round result
RN	Christophe Bentz	16,201	51.25	N/A
HOR (Ensemble)	Bérangère Abba	15,412	48.75	+5.19
Turnout		31,613	49.61	+4.61
RN gain from LREM				

=== 2017 ===
Candidate	Label	First round		Second round	
Candidate	Label	Votes	%	Votes	%
Bérangère Abba	REM	11,545	31.90	15,045	53.44
Adrien Guené	LR	6,896	19.06	13,109	46.56
Fabienne Cudel	FN	6,813	18.83		
Ariane Walaszek	FI	4,069	11.24		
Christophe Fischer	DVD	3,011	8.32		
Axel Causin	PS	1,681	4.65		
Patrick Varney	ECO	1,140	3.15		
Patricia Petronelli	PCF	369	1.02		
Sylvain Demay	EXG	299	0.83		
Yvette Le Nepveu	DIV	224	0.62		
Mireille Braun	DVG	139	0.38		
Votes		36,186	100.00	28,154	100.00
Valid votes		36,186	97.39	28,154	86.42
Blank votes		692	1.86	3,011	9.24
Null votes		276	0.74	1,413	4.34
Turnout		37,154	51.31	32,578	45.00
Abstentions		35,251	48.69	39,825	55.00
Registered voters		72,405		72,403	
Source: Ministry of the Interior

=== 2012 ===
Legislative Election 2012: Haute-Marne's 1st constituency
Party	Candidate	Votes	%	±%
UMP	Luc Chatel	20,620	45.76	
EELV	Patricia Andriot	14,417	31.99	
FN	Thomas Suillot	5,422	12.03	
FG	Céline Surel	2,203	4.89	
Others	N/A	2,401		
Turnout		45,063	60.48	
2nd round result
UMP	Luc Chatel	24,346	55.05	
EELV	Patricia Andriot	19,879	44.95	
Turnout		44,225	59.35	
UMP hold				
