= Sylvain Templier =

French politician

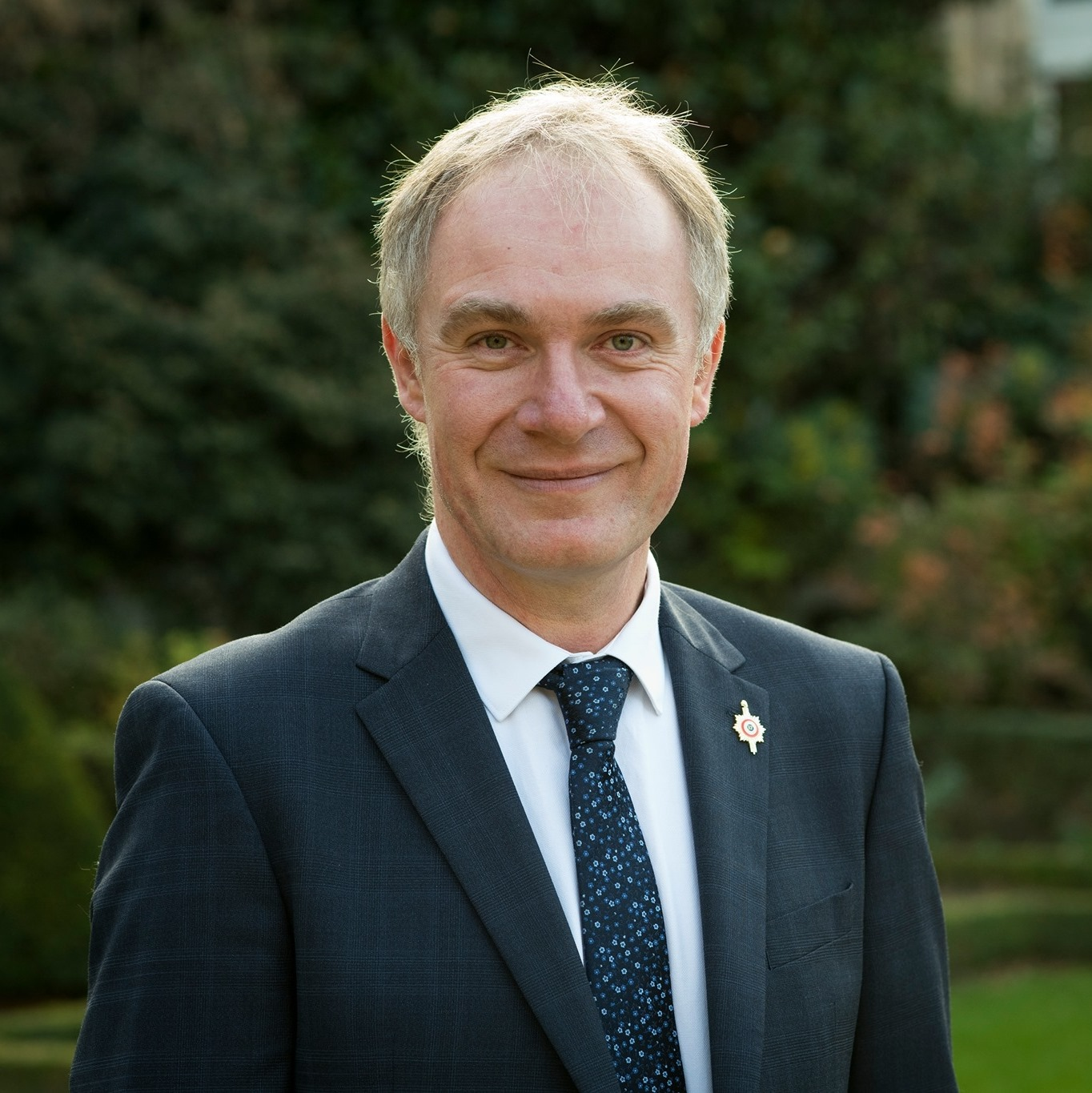

Member of the National Assembly for Haute-Marne's 1st constituency
- Incumbent
- Assumed office 27 August 2020
- Preceded by: Bérangère Abba

Personal details
- Born: 27 December 1971 (age 54) Soissons, Aisne, France
- Party: La République En Marche!

Sylvain Templier (born 27 December 1971) is a French nurse and politician who has been Member of Parliament for Haute-Marne's 1st constituency since 2020.
