= Nicolas Lacroix =

French politician (born 1976)

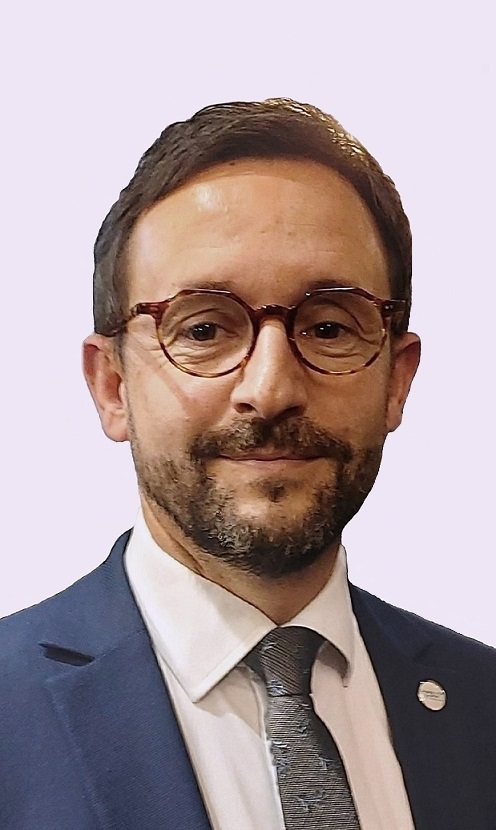
- Lacroix in 2024

President of the Departmental Council of Haute-Marne
- Incumbent
- Assumed office 6 November 2017
- Preceded by: Bruno Sido

Mayor of Bourdons-sur-Rognon
- In office 9 March 2008 – 6 November 2017
- Preceded by: Andrée Menet
- Succeeded by: Gilles Berthet

Personal details
- Born: 18 January 1976 (age 50)
- Party: The Republicans

Nicolas Lacroix (born 18 January 1976) is a French politician of The Republicans. Since 2017, he has served as president of the Departmental Council of Haute-Marne. From 2008 to 2017, he served as mayor of Bourdons-sur-Rognon. In 2018, he was appointed secretary for territorial collectivities in the shadow cabinet of Laurent Wauquiez. In 2023, he was appointed secretary for waters and forests in the shadow cabinet of Éric Ciotti. In the 2024 legislative election, he was a candidate for Haute-Marne's 2nd constituency.
