= Jean-Claude Mathis =

French politician

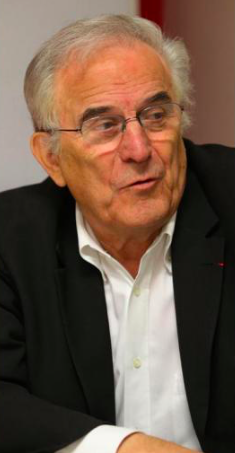
Jean-Claude Mathis

Jean-Claude Mathis (born August 15, 1939 in Bouzonville, Moselle) was a member of the National Assembly of France. He represented the 2nd constituency of Aube from 2002 to 2017, as a member of the Union for a Popular Movement.

== Biography ==
He was elected deputy on June 16, 2002, for the 12th legislature (2002-2007), in the 2nd district of Aube. He is a member of the Union for a Popular Movement group. He was re-elected deputy in 2007 and again in 2012.

On November 27, 2012, he joined the Rassemblement-UMP group chaired by François Fillon.

In March 2015, he was elected departmental councilor for the Canton of Les Riceys alongside Christine Patrois. Their alternates are Jean-Michel Hupfer and Myriam Luttun. He resigned shortly thereafter from the departmental council and was replaced by his alternate, Jean-Michel Hupfer.

He supports François Fillon in the 2016 Republican presidential primary.

In the 2020 municipal elections, the list he headed came in second and last with 248 votes, or 45.17%. Laurent Noirot, a former member of his team, came out on top with 301 votes, or 54.83%. On May 27, 2020, Laurent Noirot was elected mayor of Les Riceys. Jean-Claude Mathis, however, remains a municipal councilor for the town.
