= Christophe Bentz =

French writer and politician

Member of the National Assembly for Haute-Marne's 1st constituency
- Incumbent
- Assumed office 2022
- Preceded by: Sylvain Templier

Personal details
- Born: 4 July 1987 (age 38) Rueil-Malmaison, France
- Party: National Rally
- Other political affiliations: Christian Democratic Party (after 2012); Movement for France (before 2011)
- Profession: Politician, author, teacher

Christophe Bentz (born 4 July 1987 in Rueil-Malmaison) is a French author, lecturer, commentator and politician affiliated to the National Rally.

Since 2022 he has been a member of the National Assembly for Haute-Marne's 1st constituency.

== Biography ==
Bentz graduated with degrees in history, political science and communication with a focus on music and French culture. He worked as an advisor to the cabinet of the president of the Departmental Council of Charente and also taught sociology at the Institute of Social, Economic and Political Sciences of Lyon (ISSEP).

Bentz first became involved in politics when he helped with the No campaign during the 2005 French European Constitution referendum. He then became a member of the Movement for France (MPF) party and was president of its youth-wing Jeunes pour la France in 2010. However, he was removed from the position by party leader Philippe de Villiers in 2011 after he contributed to the controversial book Décrypter l'antiracisme en une heure which was accused of endorsing racial biology and caused a stir when he described abortion as "mass murder."

He then co-founded the think-tank Movement of values for dissident France, which merged into the Sovereignty, Identity and Freedoms (SIEL) party the following year. In the 2012 French legislative election he unsuccessfully stood as a candidate for the Christian Democratic Party before joining the National Rally in 2017.

During the 2022 French legislative election, he was selected to run in Haute-Marne's 1st constituency. Bentz focused his campaign on rural issues, pension reform and local healthcare. He was ultimately successful in taking the seat.
