= François Baroin =

French politician (born 1965)

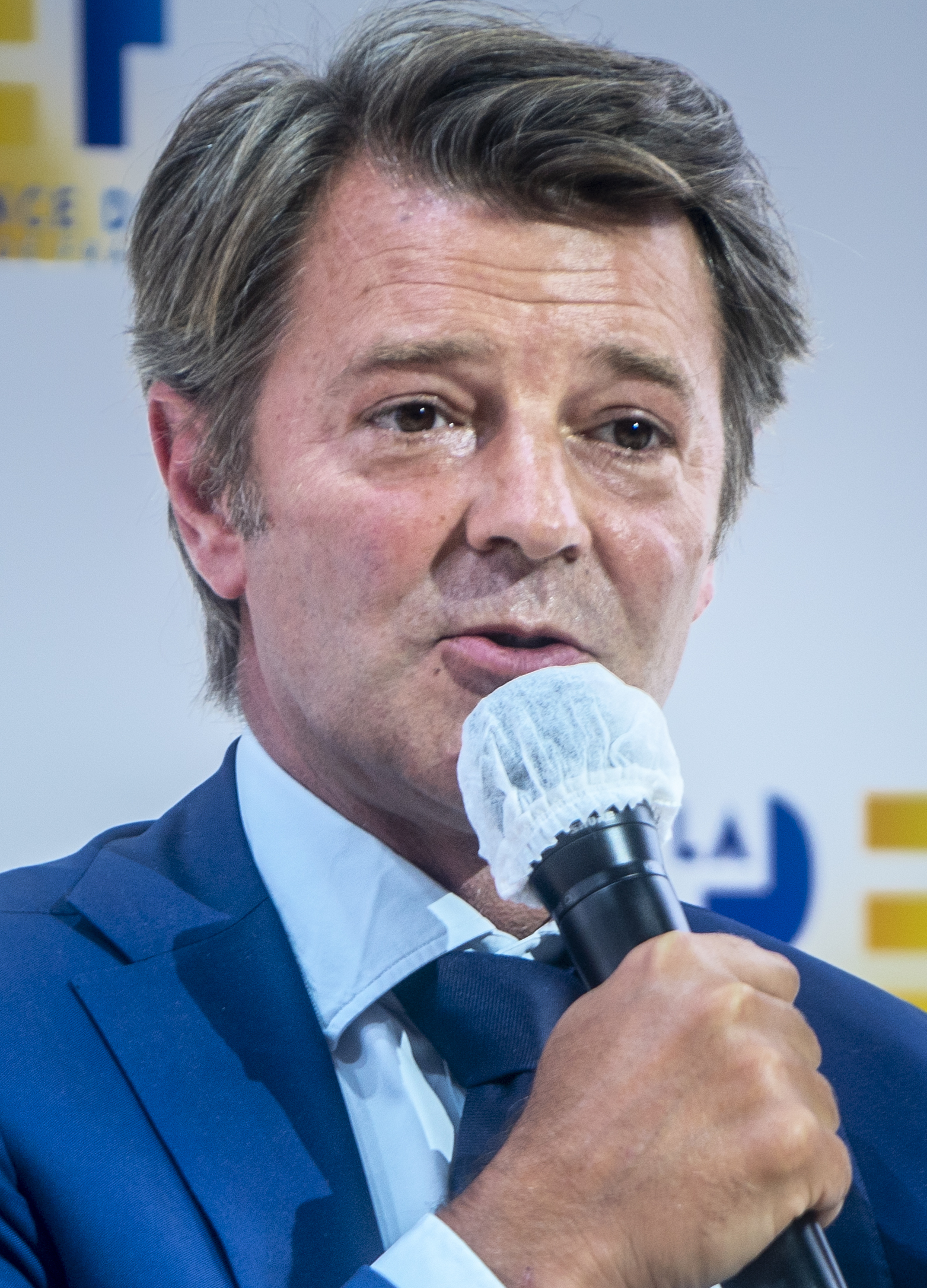
- Baroin in 2020

Mayor of Troyes
- Incumbent
- Assumed office 25 June 1995
- Preceded by: Robert Galley

Member of the Senate for Aube
- In office 1 October 2014 – 1 October 2017
- Preceded by: Yann Gaillard
- Succeeded by: Évelyne Perrot

Minister of Finance
- In office 19 July 2011 – 10 May 2012
- Prime Minister: François Fillon
- Preceded by: Christine Lagarde
- Succeeded by: Pierre Moscovici

Minister of the Budget
- In office 21 March 2010 – 19 July 2011
- Prime Minister: François Fillon
- Preceded by: Éric Wœrth
- Succeeded by: Valérie Pécresse

Minister of the Interior
- In office 26 March 2007 – 18 May 2007
- Prime Minister: Dominique de Villepin
- Preceded by: Nicolas Sarkozy
- Succeeded by: Michèle Alliot-Marie

Government Spokesman
- In office 14 November 2010 – 29 June 2011
- Prime Minister: François Fillon
- Preceded by: Luc Chatel
- Succeeded by: Valérie Pécresse
- In office 17 May 1995 – 7 November 1995
- Prime Minister: Alain Juppé
- Preceded by: Philippe Douste-Blazy
- Succeeded by: Alain Lamassoure

Minister of the Overseas
- In office 2 June 2005 – 26 March 2007
- Prime Minister: Dominique de Villepin
- Preceded by: Brigitte Girardin
- Succeeded by: Hervé Mariton

Member of the National Assembly for Aube's 3rd constituency
- In office 28 March 1993 – 30 September 2014
- Preceded by: Michel Cartelet
- Succeeded by: Gérard Menuel

Personal details
- Born: François Claude Pierre René Baroin; 21 June 1965 (age 61) Paris, France
- Party: The Republicans (2015–present)
- Other political affiliations: Rally for the Republic (1993-2002); Union for a Popular Movement (2002–2015)
- Education: Panthéon-Assas University; Higher Institute of Management

François Claude Pierre René Baroin (French pronunciation: [fʁɑ̃swa klod pjɛʁ ʁəne baʁwɛ̃]; born 21 June 1965) is a French politician and lawyer who served as Finance Minister from 2011 to 2012, following a stint as Budget Minister in the government of Prime Minister François Fillon. A member of The Republicans (LR), he was a long-time ally of Jacques Chirac and has been Mayor of Troyes in Champagne since 1995.

== Early life and education ==
Baroin was born in the 12th arrondissement of Paris to an upper-class family. His father Michel Baroin was a student friend of Chirac's who went on to become a leading freemason, chairman of retailer Fnac and the insurer GMF, and a powerful local politician.

Baroin studied at Collège Stanislas de Paris before moving to ISG Business School and Panthéon-Assas University.

== Early career ==
Baroin started his career as a political correspondent for Europe 1 from 1988 until 1992.

== Political career ==
In 1992, at Chirac's behest, Baroin joined his party Rally for the Republic (RPR). He became a member of the National Assembly in the 1993 elections – where he served on the Committee on Legal Affairs – and the mayor of Troyes, a mid-sized city South-East of Paris, two years later.

Baroin was appointed Chirac's campaign spokesman in the 1995 French presidential election. Following the elections, he became first state secretary and government spokesman under Prime Minister Alain Juppé and then, after a reshuffle, a political aide to the president.

Returning to parliament, Baroin was a member of the National Assembly's Finance Committee (1997–2001), the Committee on Cultural Affairs (2001–2002) and the Committee on Legal Affairs (2002–2005). He also served as the Assembly's vice-president between 2002 and 2005.

In the government led by Prime Minister Dominique de Villepin, Baroin served as Minister for Overseas Territories from June 2005 to March 2007 and was briefly Minister of the Interior from March to May 2007. He replaced Nicolas Sarkozy on 26 March 2007 as Interior Minister when Sarkozy left the Government to pursue his presidential candidacy. During his time as Minister of the Budget in the government of Prime Minister François Fillon from 2010 until 2011, Baroin successfully managed controversial dossiers such as wealth tax reform, the reduction of civil servants and the abolition of Sarkozy's controversial tax cap for the rich.

On 29 June 2011, Baroin was appointed Minister for the Economy, Finance and Industry in Fillon's cabinet, replacing Christine Lagarde following her appointment as Director General of the International Monetary Fund. At the time, he was one of three candidates discussed for the role, alongside Bruno Le Maire and Valérie Pécresse. The appointment was seen as a tribute to Baroin's presumed ability to sell austerity to the French public and to unpick the economic policy of the opposition Socialist Party. During his brief time in office, he chaired the meetings of the Group of Eight ministers of finance when France held the group's presidency in 2011.

From 2014, Baroin served as president of the France's Mayors Organization (Association des Maires de France), a powerful organization for more than 36,000 mayors in France.

Ahead of the 2017 French presidential election, Baroin played a central role in the campaign of François Fillon. After Fillon was eliminated in the first round of voting, Baroin declared that he would vote for Emmanuel Macron in the runoff election and that he would be available as prime minister in a cohabitation; however, Macron eventually chose Édouard Philippe for the post.

== Career in the private sector ==
In 2018, Baroin joined the French investment banking business of Barclays as an external senior advisor.

When Christian Jacob was elected chairman of the Republicans in 2019, he appointed Baroin as strategic advisor. In 2020, Baroin was mentioned by news media as potential candidate for the 2022 French presidential election; however, he declared in October 2020 that he would not run for president.

Ahead of the Republicans' 2022 convention, Baroin endorsed Éric Ciotti as the party's chairman.

Since 2016, he has been an Associate Professor of Macroeconomics, Geopolitics and Crisis management at HEC Paris.

== Other activities ==
- European Investment Bank (EIB), Ex-Officio Member of the Board of Governors (2011–2012)

== Wiretapping by NSA ==
In 2015, WikiLeaks revealed that the U.S. National Security Agency wiretapped Baroin's communication during his time as Minister of Finance.

== Personal life ==
Baroin married fellow journalist Valérie Broquisse in 1991 and they have three children. Following their divorce, he was the partner of the journalist Marie Drucker until they separated in 2008. In 2009, he was linked with Michèle Laroque.

== Overview ==
Governmental functions

Ministre of Economy, Finance and Industry : 2011–2012.

Government's Spokesman : 2010–2011.

Minister of Budget, Public Accounts and State Reform : 2010–2011.

Minister of Interior : March–May 2007.

Minister of Overseas Territories : 2005–2007.

Government's spokesman : May–November 1995.

Electoral mandates

Senate

Senator for Aube : since 2014.

National Assembly of France

Vice-president of the National Assembly of France : 2002–2005

Member of the National Assembly of France for Aube (3rd constituency) : 1993–1995 (Became government's spokesman in 1995) / 1997–2005 (Became minister in 2005) / 2007–2010 (Became minister in 2010) / 2012-2014 (elected as a senator). Elected in 1993, reelected in 1997, 2002, 2007, 2012.

Municipal Council

Mayor of Troyes : Since 1995. Reelected in 2001, 2008, 2014.

Municipal councillor of Troyes : Since 1995. Reelected in 2001, 2008, 2014.

Agglomeration community Council

President of the Agglomeration community of Troyes : Since 2001. Reelected in 2008, 2014.

Member of the Agglomeration community of Troyes : Since 2001. Reelected in 2008, 2014.

Political offices
Preceded by Robert Galley	Mayor of Troyes; 1995–present	Incumbent
Preceded by Nicolas Sarkozy	Minister of the Interior; 2007	Succeeded by Michèle Alliot-Marie
Preceded by Éric Wœrth	Minister of the Budget; 2010–2011	Succeeded by Valérie Pécresse
Preceded by Christine Lagarde	Minister of Finance; 2011–2012	Succeeded by Pierre Moscovici
