= Marc Laffineur =

French politician

Marc Laffineur (born 10 August 1945) in Maubeuge is a French politician. He was a member of the National Assembly of France from 1988 to 2011, representing the Maine-et-Loire department, and is a member of the Union for a Popular Movement (UMP).

On 29 June 2011 he was appointed Minister of Veteran Affairs.

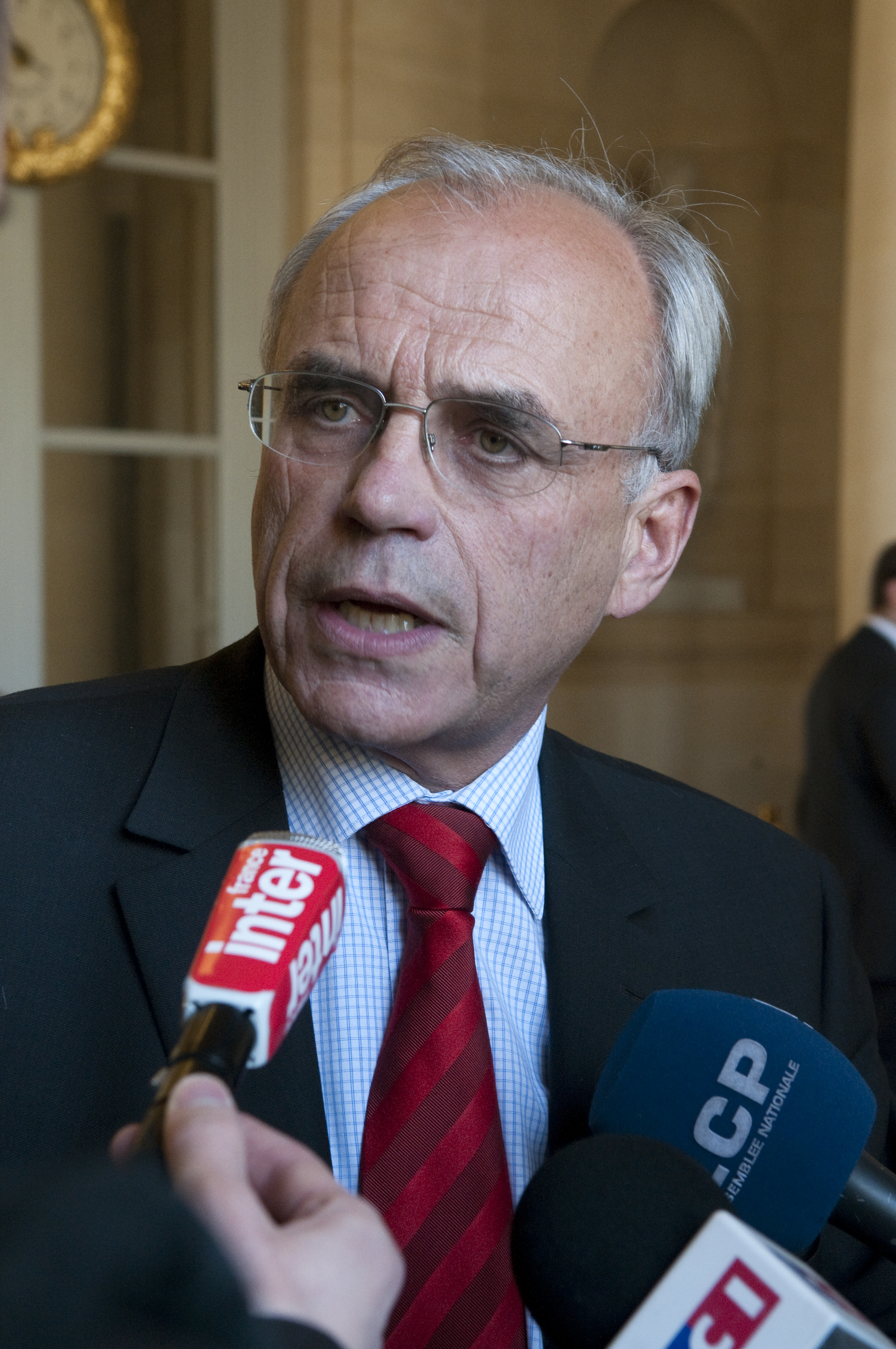
Marc Laffineur at the National Assembly
