= Laurence Robert-Dehault =

French politician

Member of the National Assembly for Haute-Marne's 2nd constituency
- Incumbent
- Assumed office 22 June 2022
- Preceded by: François Cornut-Gentille

Personal details
- Born: 17 January 1964 (age 62) Saint-Dizier, France
- Party: National Rally
- Occupation: Therapist, politician

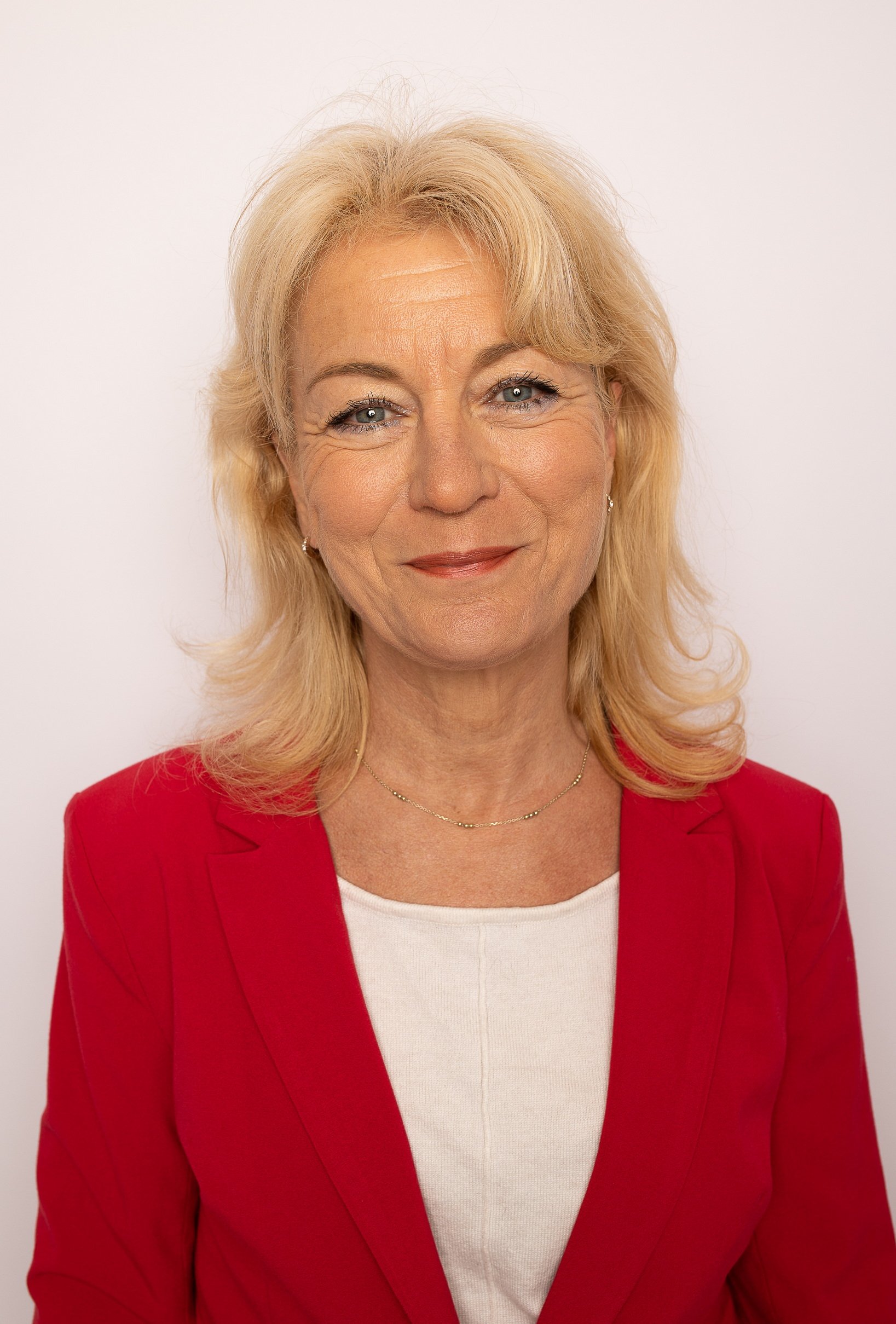

Laurence Robert-Dehault (born 17 January 1964) is a French politician of the National Rally and the Member of the National Assembly for Haute-Marne's 2nd constituency since 2022.

Robert-Dehault was born in 1964 in Saint-Dizier. Her sister-in-law Élisabeth Robert-Dehaut was mayor of Saint-Dizier from 2017 to 2021 for the Les Républicains party. Robert-Dehault was a hypnotherapist before becoming a politician.

She stood for the National Rally in Haute-Marne's 2nd constituency for the 2022 French legislative election where she was elected deputy in the second round defeating incumbent François Cornut-Gentille.
