= Haute-Marne =

Department of France in Grand Est

- Department
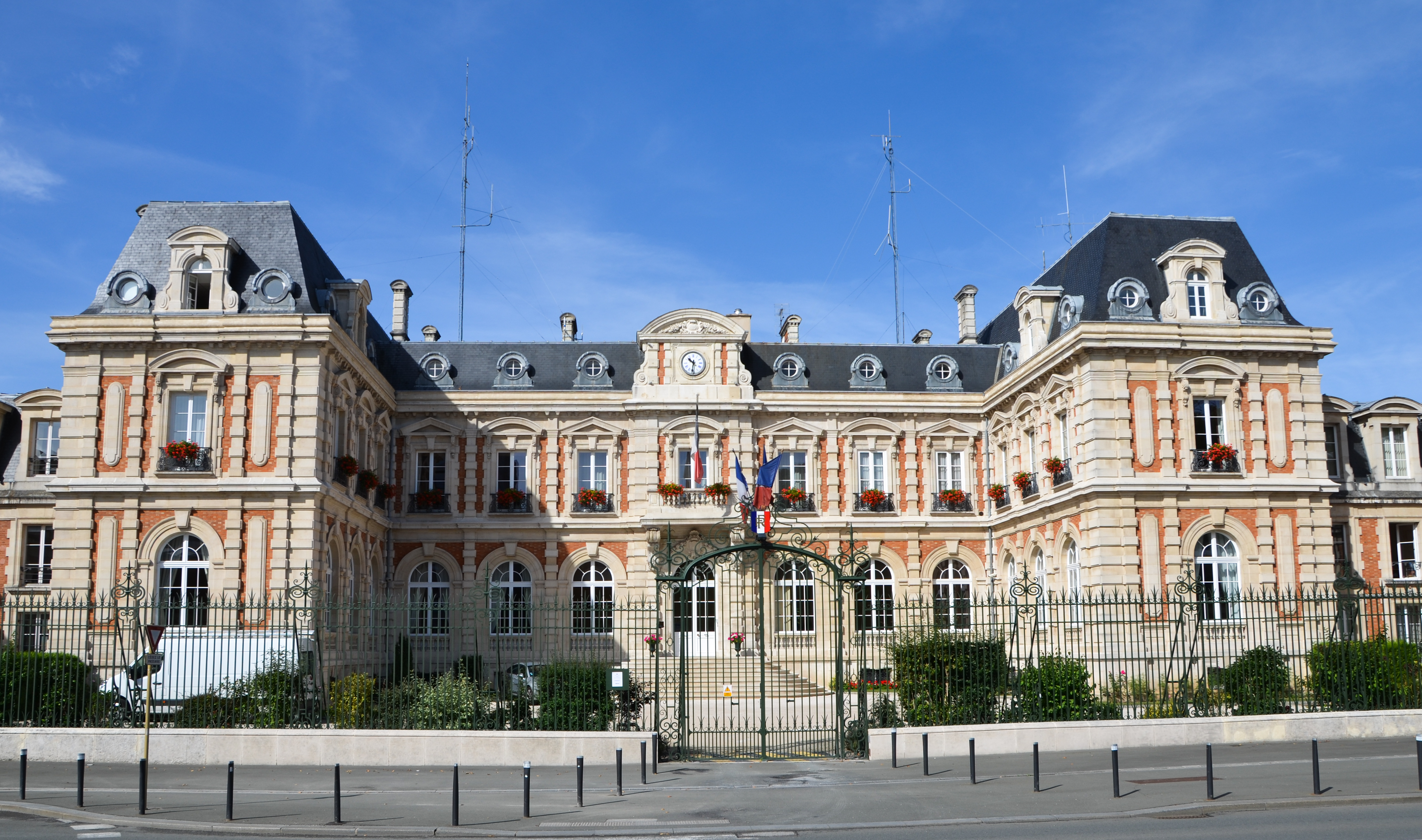
- Prefecture building in Chaumont

- Flag Coat of arms

- Location of Haute-Marne in France
- Coordinates: 48°05′N 05°15′E
- Country: France
- Region: Grand Est
- Prefecture: Chaumont
- Subprefectures: Langres; Saint-Dizier

Government
  - President of the Departmental Council: Nicolas Lacroix (LR)

Area^{1}
  - Total: 6,211 km^{2} (2,398 sq mi)

Population (2023)
  - Total: 168,331
  - Rank: 94th
  - Density: 27.10/km^{2} (70.19/sq mi)
- Time zone: UTC+1 (CET)
  - Summer (DST): UTC+2 (CEST)
- Department number: 52
- Arrondissements: 3
- Cantons: 17
- Communes: 426
- ^1 French Land Register data, which exclude estuaries and lakes, ponds and glaciers larger than 1 km^{2}.

Haute-Marne (French pronunciation: [ot maʁn]; English: Upper Marne) is a department in the Grand Est region of Northeastern France. Named after the river Marne, its prefecture is Chaumont. In 2023, it had a population of 168,331.

== History ==
Haute-Marne is one of the original 83 departments created during the French Revolution on March 4, 1790. It was created from parts of the former provinces of Champagne, Burgundy, Lorraine and Franche-Comté.

In March 1814 the departmental prefecture, Chaumont, was the unwitting witness to the end of the First Empire. On 1 March, Prussia, Russia, the United Kingdom and Austria signed an accord forbidding any individual peace deal with Napoleon I, and to fight until his final defeat.

During World War II, Haute-Marne was partitioned under German occupation. The canal which runs from the Marne to the Saône served as a border, dividing the department into east and west. The east was a "reserved zone", intended for the creation of a new German (Ripuarian) state, whereas to the west would be the traditional "occupied zone". Haute-Marne was finally liberated by the Allies, in the form of the division of General Leclerc, between August and September 1944.

== Geography ==
Haute-Marne is part of the region of Grand Est and is surrounded by the departments of Meuse, Vosges, Haute-Saône, Côte-d'Or, Aube, and Marne.

The highest mountain is Haut-du-Sac, in the Langres Plateau, in the southwest of the department, which rises to a height of 516 m (1,693 ft). The lowest points at 117 m (384 ft) are found on the plains of Perthois and Der.

The department is named after the river Marne, whose source is near Langres. This river covers 120 km (75 mi) within the department. The department is to the east of the Parisian basin, and is characterised by a concentric sequence of cliff faces of varying geological origin, oriented northeast–southwest.

=== Principal towns ===
The most populous commune is Saint-Dizier; the prefecture Chaumont is the second-most populous. As of 2023, there are 6 communes with more than 2,500 inhabitants:

Commune	Population (2023)
Saint-Dizier	22,858
Chaumont	20,827
Langres	7,421
Nogent	3,550
Joinville	2,915
Wassy	2,771

== Demographics ==
Population development since 1801:

Historical population

Year	Pop.	±% p.a.
1801	226,655	—
1821	268,208	+0.85%
1851	268,208	+0.00%
1861	258,311	−0.38%
1872	251,026	−0.26%
1881	254,722	+0.16%
1891	243,322	−0.46%
1901	226,367	−0.72%
1911	214,621	−0.53%
1921	198,777	−0.76%
1931	189,726	−0.46%
1936	188,429	−0.14%

Year	Pop.	±% p.a.
1946	181,792	−0.36%
1954	197,153	+1.02%
1962	208,447	+0.70%
1968	214,340	+0.47%
1975	212,304	−0.14%
1982	210,670	−0.11%
1990	204,067	−0.40%
1999	194,873	−0.51%
2007	187,407	−0.49%
2012	182,136	−0.57%
2017	175,640	−0.72%
2023	168,331	−0.71%

== Tourism ==
The Haute-Marne department is not among France's most widely known regions, yet it has a notable historical and cultural background. Historically, it was an important industrial centre, particularly due to its strong metallurgical economy. Throughout the centuries, its strategic location also made it a territory marked by numerous conflicts and confrontations.

Thus, among other examples, the French Wars of Religion (from 1562 to 1598) began with the Massacre of Vassy in the north of the Haute-Marne department. Following this event, open military conflicts across France Kingdom began. The Edict of Nantes is the consequence of this period.

The fortified town of Langres, famous for Denis Diderot author of the Encyclopédie, the Renaissance castle of Joinville, the Lake Der-Chantecoq (one of the biggest artificial lakes in Europe), the Chateau de Cirey where Voltaire lived for a while with Émilie du Châtelet and the village of Colombey-les-Deux-Églises where Charles De Gaulle lived until his death are all major attractions.

Haute-Marne is also well known for some famous French great men and women as:

- Louise Michel
- Camille Flammarion and his brother Ernest Flammarion
- Goncourt brothers most famous all around the world with the Prix Goncourt, literature prize given by the académie Goncourt for "the best and most imaginative prose work of the year"
- Albin Michel
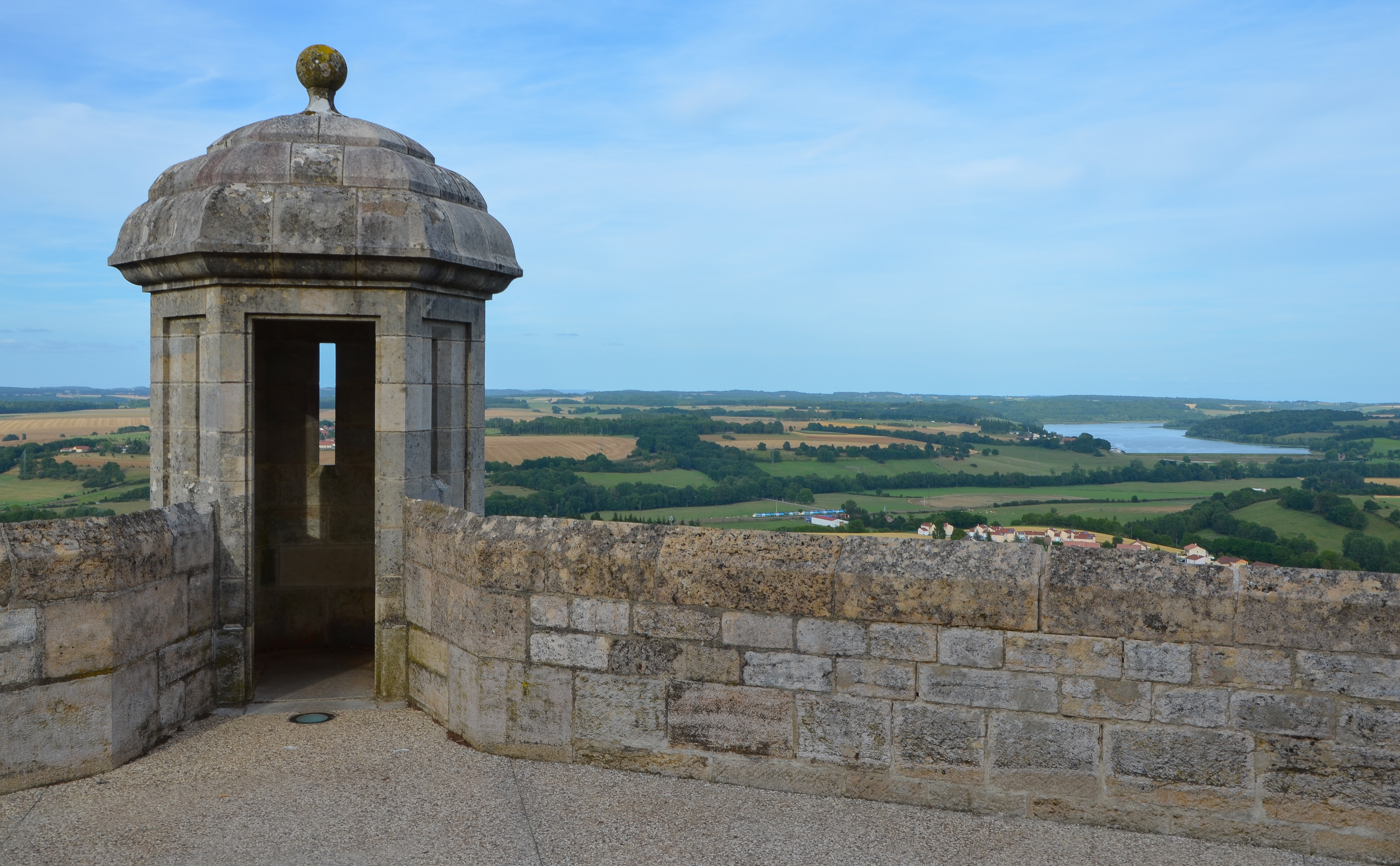
View from the walls of Langres

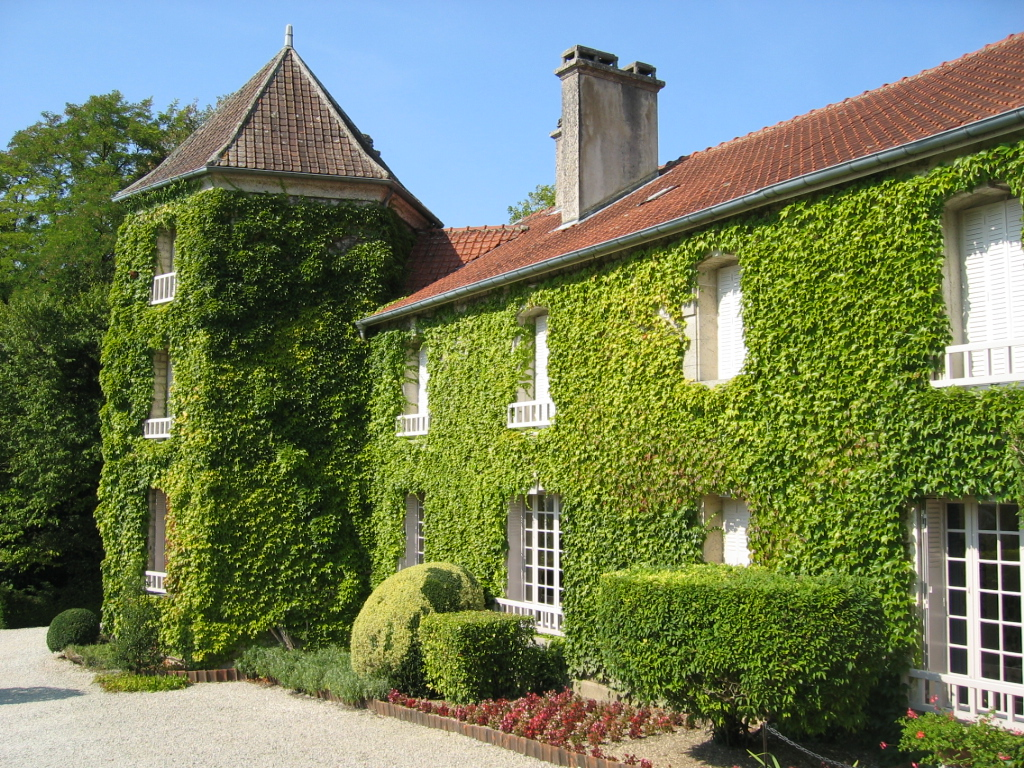
Charles de Gaulle's private residence in Colombey-les-Deux-Églises

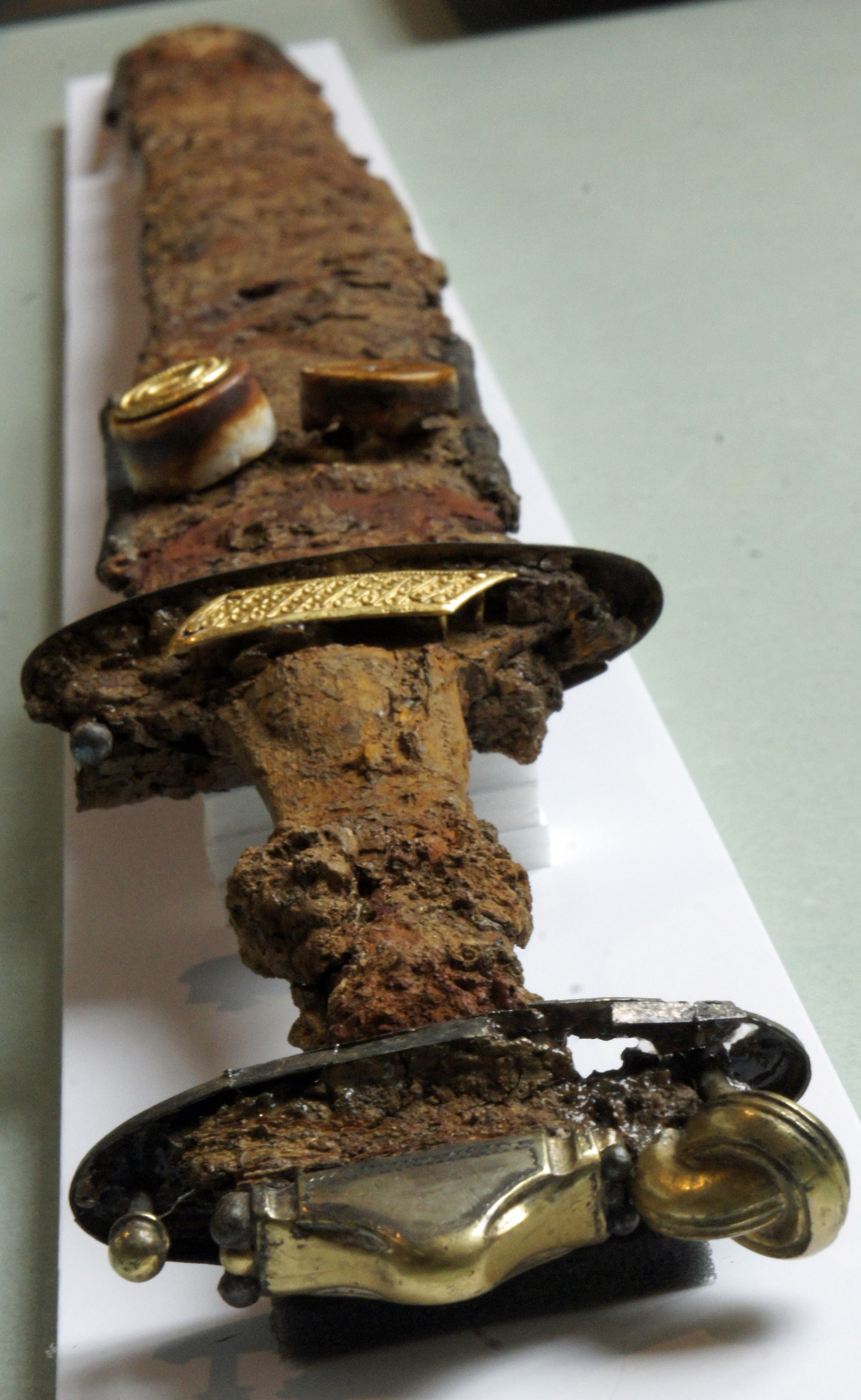
Frankish sword discovered in Saint-Dizier

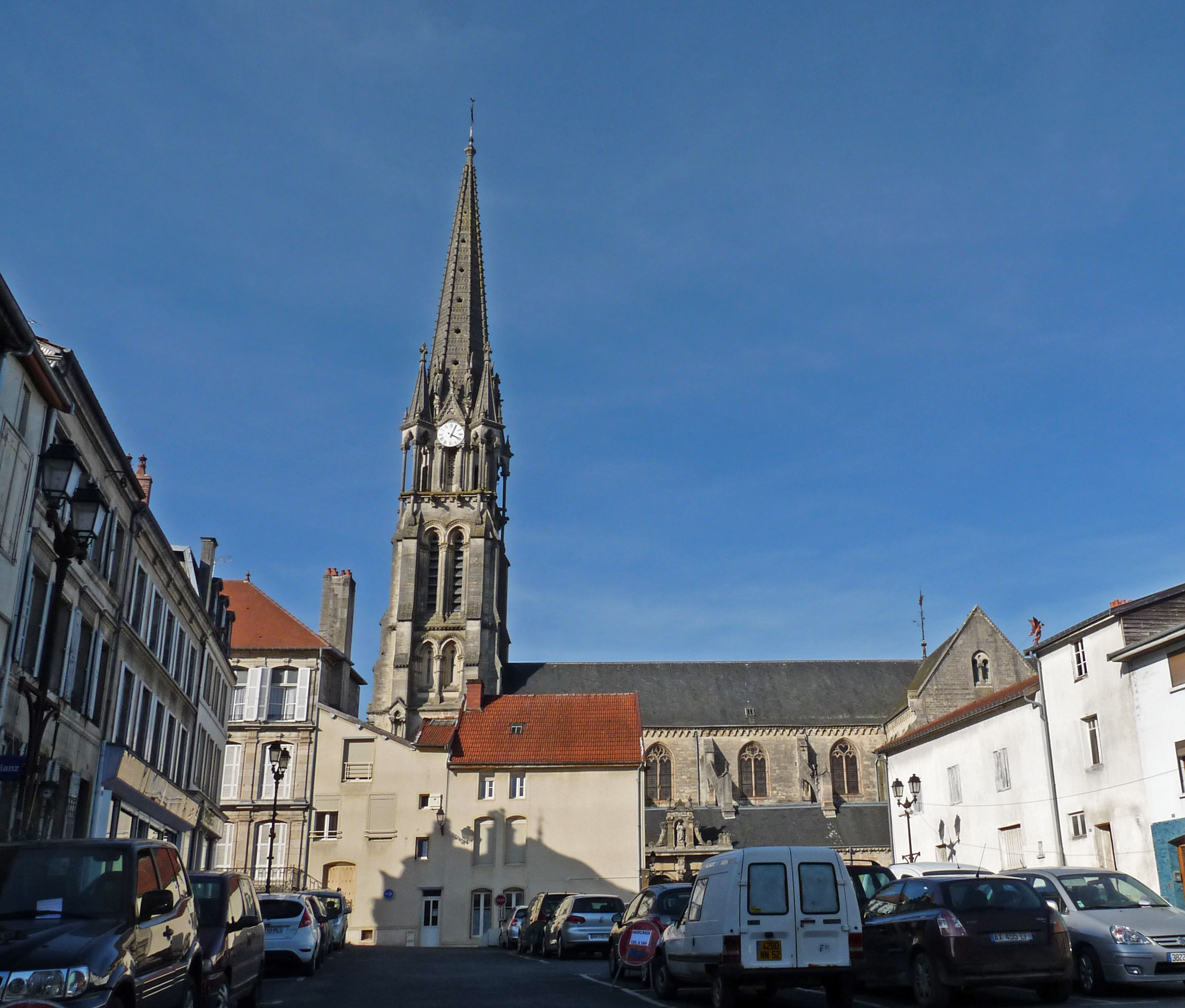
Joinville

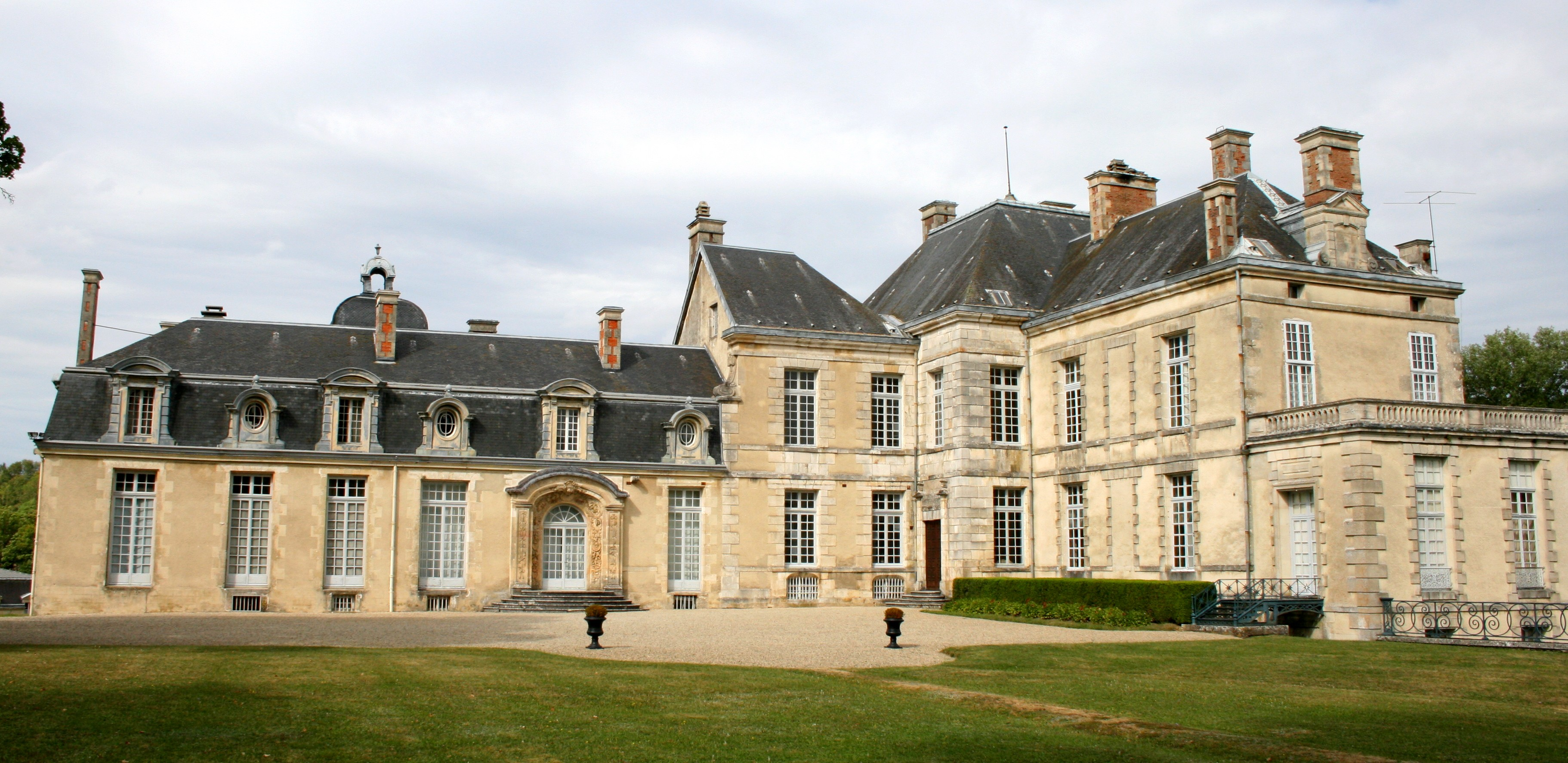
Château of Cirey-sur-Blaise

== Politics ==
Charles de Gaulle was a longtime resident of the department, in Colombey-les-Deux-Églises, and died there on 9 November 1970, at the age of 79.

The president of the Departmental Council is Nicolas Lacroix, elected in 2017.

=== Presidential elections 2nd round ===
Election	Winning candidate	Party	%	2nd place candidate	Party	%
2022	Marine Le Pen	RN	56.96	Emmanuel Macron	LREM	43.04
2017	Emmanuel Macron	LREM	50.48	Marine Le Pen	FN	49.52
2012	Nicolas Sarkozy	UMP	54.43	François Hollande	PS	45.57
2007	Nicolas Sarkozy	UMP	59.14	Ségolène Royal	PS	40.86
2002	Jacques Chirac	RPR	76.17	Jean-Marie Le Pen	FN	23.83
1995	Jacques Chirac	RPR	52.17	Lionel Jospin	PS	47.83
1988	François Mitterrand	PS	54.69	Jacques Chirac	RPR	45.31

=== Current National Assembly Representatives ===
Constituency	Member	Party
Haute-Marne's 1st constituency	Christophe Bentz	National Rally
Haute-Marne's 2nd constituency	Laurence Robert-Dehault	National Rally

== See also ==
- Arrondissements of the Haute-Marne department
- Cantons of the Haute-Marne department
- Communes of the Haute-Marne department
