= Louis Belmas =

French Catholic bishop (1757–1841)

- Constitutional Bishop of the Aude, then Bishop of Cambrai
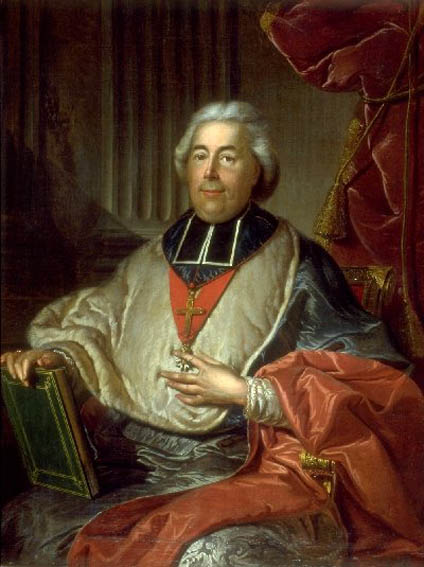
- See: Aude (1801), Cambrai (1802–1814)
- Installed: 1801 (Aude), 1802 (Cambrai)
- Term ended: 1801 (Aude), 1814 (Cambrai)

Personal details
- Born: 11 August 1757 Montréal, Languedoc, Kingdom of France
- Died: 21 July 1841 (aged 83) Cambrai, Kingdom of France
- Denomination: Catholic Church
- Coat of arms

Louis Belmas (11 August 1757 – 21 July 1841) was a French Catholic churchman and bishop.

== Life ==
=== Early life ===
Louis was born to a publicly esteemed businessman in Languedoc and his wife, both of whom died within six weeks of each other when Louis was aged only 4½. They left behind Louis, seven other children and a very limited fortune. Louis was adopted by his godfather, who took him into his household and took charge of his education. Louis was first sent to the schools in his small birthplace and soon began studying Latin at the collège in Carcassonne. There, from his 'sixième' year to his 'rhétorique' year at the collège de l'Esquille at Toulouse, he enjoyed brilliant success, nearly always coming first in the public exams.

At the end of 1772 he received the tonsure from Armand Bazin de Bezons, bishop of Carcassonne, who two years later gave Belmas a bursary to attend the Toulouse seminary, run by Oratorian priests, where Belmas studied philosophy and theology with distinction and from which he graduated bachelor. He then returned to Carcassonne and was ordained priest on 22 December 1781. He was then made vicar of Saint-Michel de Carcassonne, a role he successfully filled until 1782, when he became a prebendary at the collegial church of Saint-Vincent de Montréal and was summoned by bishop M. Chastenet de Puységur to head the seminary at Carcassonne. In 1786, de Puységur made him promoter general of the diocese and (on Belmas's request) granted him the cure of Carlipa. By the general wish of the people of Carlipa, Belmas was then summoned to the cure of Castelnaudary, capital of Lauraguais. In this new post, he won the commitment and confidence of those with whom he disagreed and protected démissionnaires from over-exultancy, becoming known in Castelnaudary as le Bon curé. His reputation of bounty spread with that of his major talents in administration and charity, to the point where (aged 43) he was judged worthy of a see.

=== Aude ===
M. Guillaume Besancel, constitutional bishop of the Aude, rendered unable to carry out his duty by infirmities and old age, stated his desire to have a coadjutor. In obedience to the regime then in force, public votes were carried out for such a post, won every time by Belmas. Besancel died on 6 February 1801 and Belmas (who had supported the civil constitution of the clergy) replaced him on 26 October 1800. He was consecrated at Carcassonne during the sitting of a provincial council of 11 bishops. Belmas then assisted at the national council in Paris in 1801, taking the title of bishop of Narbonne (a city that, under the demarcation laid out by the National Constituent Assembly, had become the seat of the bishop of Aude). At the end of the national council Belmas pronounced a discourse on the subject of conferences which had been indicated with the non-swearing clergy.

=== 1801–1815 ===
After the Concordat of 1801, Fouché made Belmas one of the 12 constitutional bishops who were re-appointed to new seats. It was known that many of these prelates (including Belmas) were refusing to sign a retraction that the legate would demand of them – they declared only that they renounced the civil constitution of the clergy, condemned by the Holy See. When France's break from Rome was finally ended by the combined efforts of pope Pius VII and first consul Napoleon, Belmas was appointed to the seat of Cambrai (now only a diocese under the metropolitan of Paris rather than an archdiocese of its own) on 11 April 1802. He was sworn in on 18 April that year and enthroned the following 6 June.

Prior to Belmas's arrival, Cambrai was not what it once was, with a glut of clergy and fine religious buildings but no bishop and a cathedral in ruins. His first priority was to organise and rebuild the diocese from scratch. Such work was vast and near-impossible, with no unity or discipline among its clergy, not a single priestly establishment and no monetary resources, but (far from being discouraged) Belmas's zeal and energy was only redoubled by such obstacles. Appealing to the charity of the faithful and with no government subsidy, he brought all his projects to fruition. For a new cathedral he at first chose the former abbey church of Saint-Aubert (formerly known as the église Saint-Géry), preserved but in secular use, then shortly afterwards the church of Saint-Sépulcre, setting up his own base in Saint-Sépulcre's former abbey buildings. He devoted all his energy and concerns to reorganising the liturgy and to gathering, leading and supporting the scattered clergy. Soon he also started building a vast house for a new diocesan seminary and later, by new additions and dispositions, in its turn made the former Jesuit college the main seminary (using the new house as a church secondary school instead).

When the pope arrived in Paris for Napoleon's coronation on 2 December 1802 Belmas gave a new guarantee of his feelings by signing a letter presented by the pope with a full account of the Holy See's judgements on France's ecclesiastical affairs. The tomb containing the body of Fénelon was rediscovered in 1804 and Cambrai's magistrates resolved to transfer the remains into the chapel of the hospice de Sainte-Agnès. However, the planned ceremony for the translation was more like a pagan festival than a catholic ceremony and Belmas declared that neither he nor his clergy could accept the places in the procession that they had been assigned, which he felt unworthy of his archepiscopal dignity. He appealed to Napoleon himself, who got to know the full facts on the problem and then adjourned the ceremony indefinitely. This led to resentment and even attacks against Belmas, while the new tomb was repeatedly delayed and only completed during the Second Restoration in 1815 (being inaugurated on 7 January 1826, with a remarkable sermon by Belmas).

Following Napoleon's deportation of the pope to Savona, a church council was convoked in Paris in 1811 to remedy some of the problems Catholicism was having in France – Belmas attended it but seems not to have taken an active part. He remained bishop during the First Restoration and Hundred Days. He called Napoleon his 'benefactor', having been made a baron de l'Empire by him. After his Second Restoration, Louis XVIII entered Cambrai on 26 June 1815 but (with the memory of Belmas's participation in the Champ-de-Mai ceremony on 1 June 1815 still fresh in his mind) refused to visit the bishop's palace, basing himself at a private citizen's house instead. Louis, however, later welcomed Belmas with kindness. Belmas then went to Paris, where he successfully sued for the release of some of his diocesan clergy, who had been gravely compromised during the Hundred Days and otherwise faced horrible royalist revenge – Belmas was particularly esteemed even by the Duke of Wellington, to whose support Belmas perhaps owed some of his successes around this time. Belmas refused repeated pressure to resign his see.

=== 1815–1841 ===
In apostolic letters dated 6 of the kalends of August 1817, Cambrai was once again promoted to an archdiocese at Louis XVIII's request. These letters followed the 1817 concordat, which had resolved on such a promotion, but the papal court did not wish to reward Belmas at all in this gift of a higher title. It was proposed that he resign, but he would only consent to that if they give him the title of archbishop in partibus, which the pope was unwilling to do, and so Cambrai's promotion to an archdiocese was adjourned by a papal bull of October 1822.

On a tour of France's northern provinces, Charles X arrived in Cambrai on 4 September 1827 and requested lodgings at the bishop's palace. Belmas agreed to house him and neglected nothing in showing his guest respect and devotion. He later joined the 1830 revolution without hesitation and so when Louis Philippe of France found himself in Cambrai in 1852 he made Belmas a commander of the Légion d'honneur, even suggesting his promotion to archbishop of Avignon (though Belmas declined it). Until his last day Belmas worked hard and with presence of mind for his diocese, still having his correspondence read to him and dictating his replies until shortly before his death. He was also getting ready for the next ordinations at the time of his death and sent out a letter so that his death would not delay them. After a long illness, made harder by his old age, he died on 21 July 1841 after holding the see for nearly 40 years. The see was promoted to an archdiocese after Belmas's death by a bull of pope Gregory XVI on 1 October 1841 in favour of Pierre Giraud.

Dr Lenglet carried out the autopsy on Belmas, finding the heart in a quite abnormal state (though Belmas had never complained of chest pains) and enormous tumefactions and ugly disorders in the guts. Casimir-Alexis-Joseph Wicart (then curé-doyen of Sainte-Catherine in Lille, later bishop of Fréjus) led Belmas's funeral in Cambrai, with the whole town in mourning. All the cathedral bells and all the bells at the église Saint-Géry sounded grand peals at 6am, midday and 6pm, a cannon was fired on the hour and at the bishop's palace there was a huge crush of people who had come to see the bishop one last time and to pray for him.

== Coat of arms ==
De sable, à un olivier terrassé d'or, le fût tortillé d'un serpent d'argent, au chef du second, chargé de trois étoiles d'azur; au canton des barons évèques brochant.

== Bibliography ==
- (in French) Cameracum christianum, ou Histoire ecclésiastique du diocèse de Cambrai : Extraite du Gallia christiana et d'autres ouvrages, avec des additions et une continuation jusqu'à nos jours, Lat. and Fr, Par Cambrai diocese, André Joseph Ghislain Le Glay, published by L. Lefort, 1849;
- (in French) Biographie du clergé contemporaine, by Hippolyte Barbier, published by A. Appert, 1843.
- (in French) L'Ami de la religion, published by Librairie Ecclésiastique d'Adrien Le Clere et Cie, 1841.
