= Alzonne =

Commune in Occitanie, France

- Commune
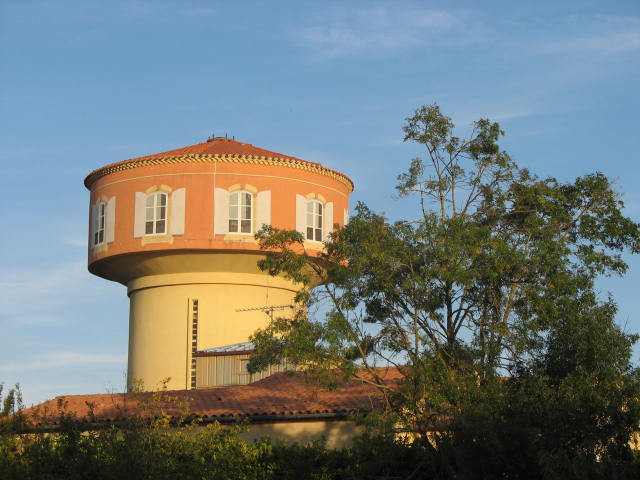
- Alzonne Water Tower

- Coat of arms
- Location of Alzonne
- Location within France Location within Occitanie
- Coordinates: 43°15′18″N 2°10′39″E
- Country: France
- Region: Occitania
- Department: Aude
- Arrondissement: Carcassonne
- Canton: La Malepère à la Montagne Noire
- Intercommunality: Carcassonne Agglo

Government
  - Mayor (2020–2026): Régis Banquet
- Area^{1}: 22.38 km^{2} (8.64 sq mi)
- Elevation: 129 m (423 ft)
- Highest elevation: 242 m (794 ft)
- Lowest elevation: 108 m (354 ft)
- Population (2023): 1,586
  - Density: 70.87/km^{2} (183.5/sq mi)
- Time zone: UTC+01:00 (CET)
  - Summer (DST): UTC+02:00 (CEST)
- INSEE/Postal code: 11009 /11170
- ^{1} French Land Register data, which excludes lakes, ponds, glaciers > 1 km^{2} (0.386 sq mi or 247 acres) and river estuaries.

Alzonne (French pronunciation: [alzɔn]; Occitan: Alzona) is a commune in the Aude department in the Occitanie region of southern France.

== Geography ==
The commune is located in the Lauragais valley some 15 km west of Carcassonne and 15 km east of Castelnaudary. The route D6113 passes through the commune from west to east between these two cities and becomes National Route N113 near Carcassonne. The Autoroute des Deux Mers (A61, E80) passes just 1 km south of the commune but the nearest exit is to the D43 near Bram. Other roads running into the commune are the D8 from Montolieu in the north, the D34 from Saint-Martin-le-Vieil in the northwest, and the D33 running west to east from Bram to Villesèquelande forms the southern border of the commune with a connecting road running north to the village. The Bordeaux-Sète railway runs west to east across the southern part of the commune but there is no station. The nearest station is at Bram.

The Fresquel river runs from west to east through the commune passing just south of the village and joining the Aude at Carcassonne. The Fresquel is joined by the Lampy just east of the village and a number of streams flow into the two rivers including the Ruisseau de Fontorbe, the Ruisseau de Rebenty, the Ruisseau de Falgous, and the Vernassonne which forms a part of the northern border of the commune. The Canal du Midi also passes through the southern part of the commune.

The commune is mostly farmland with some forests in the north. Apart from the village of Alzonne there are also the hamlets of Fongayraud and La Rode near the village, and La Migance in the north.

=== Neighbouring communes and villages ===
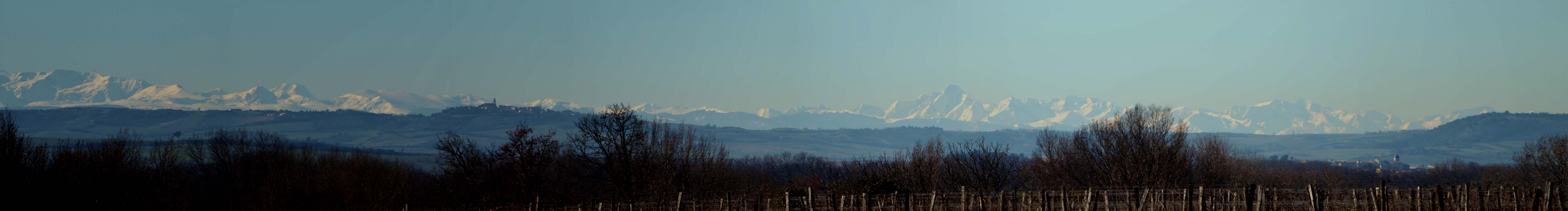
View of the Pyrenees

=== Toponymy ===
The name Alsona dates from 898 and comes from Fresquel. It is based on the Hydronymic root alz- meaning "alder" or "swamp" (Dauzat, Negre, Billy, Morvan) and the suffix -onna.

== History ==
Alzonne from the 9th century was a town of some importance as it was once the capital of the viguerie of its name: vicaria Ausonensis; therefore Alzonne was also known in pago Carcassensi. In this respect the situation of Alzonne has hardly changed since this small town is today the capital of the canton of its name in the arrondissement of Carcassonne.

Its ancient and enduring importance is due to the fertility of its land and the rivers that form its fertile valley. Once the city was fortified and was besieged and taken three times during the Wars of Religion of the 16th century. It was a strategic place in the crusade against the Albigensians.

=== Heraldry ===
Arms of Alzonne	The official Blazon remains to be determined. Blazon: Argent, embrassé sinister Azure.

== Administration ==
List of Successive Mayors of Alzonne

Mayors from the French Revolution to 1929

From	To	Name
1789	1791	Jean Faral
1791	1792	Planchett
1792	1793	Joseph Saisset
1793	1794	Jean Sales
1794	1795	Jean Duquos
1795	1808	Jean Sales
1808	1815	Jean Faral
1815	1824	Honoré Denille
1824	1830	Jean Paul Sales
1830	1853	Jean Baptiste Gellis
1853	1865	Jean Baptiste Denille
1865	1870	Pierre Rancoule
1870	1874	Pierre Edmond Vialatte
1874	1876	Pierre Rancoule
1876	1901	Edmond Henri Vialatte
1901	1904	Marin de Stofflet
1904	1913	Jules Alquier-Griffoulet
1913	1914	Joseph Marty
1914	1922	Henri Guilhot
1922	1929	Antoine Vieu

Mayors from 1929

From	To	Name	Party
1929	1943	Jean Bousquet	
1943	1944	Georges Satgé	
1944	1945	Edouard Revel	
1945	1971	Antoine Azam	SFIO
1971	1977	Grégoire Vanacker	PS
1977	1995	Jacques Tramunt	PS
1995	2014	Jean-Marie Salles	PS
2014	2026	Régis Banquet	PS

== Population ==
The inhabitants of the commune are known as Alzonnois or Alzonnoises in French.

Historical population
Year	Pop.	±% p.a.
1968	1,177	—
1975	1,206	+0.35%
1982	1,208	+0.02%
1990	1,225	+0.17%
1999	1,221	−0.04%
2007	1,239	+0.18%
2012	1,438	+3.02%
2017	1,522	+1.14%
2023	1,586	+0.69%
Source: INSEE

== Culture and heritage ==
=== Civil heritage ===
The commune has two structures that are registered as historical objects:

- The War Memorial (1921)
- The Monument to Vialatte (1902)

Other sites of interest

- The Rébenty Aqueduct on the Canal du Midi across the Ruisseau de Rébenty

=== Religious heritage ===
The Church contains two items that are registered as historical objects:

- A Bronze Bell (1782)
- A Bronze Bell (1591)

== Notable People linked to the commune ==
- Jean Dours (1809-1877), Bishop of Soissons, was born in Alzonne
- Antoine Gayraud (18 May 1910 in Alzonne - 18 March 1981 in Carcassonne), French politician
- Françoise de Veyrinas (4 September 1943 - 16 August 2008), born and died in Alzonne, French politician

== See also ==
- Communes of the Aude department
