= Arzens =

Commune in Occitanie, France

- Commune
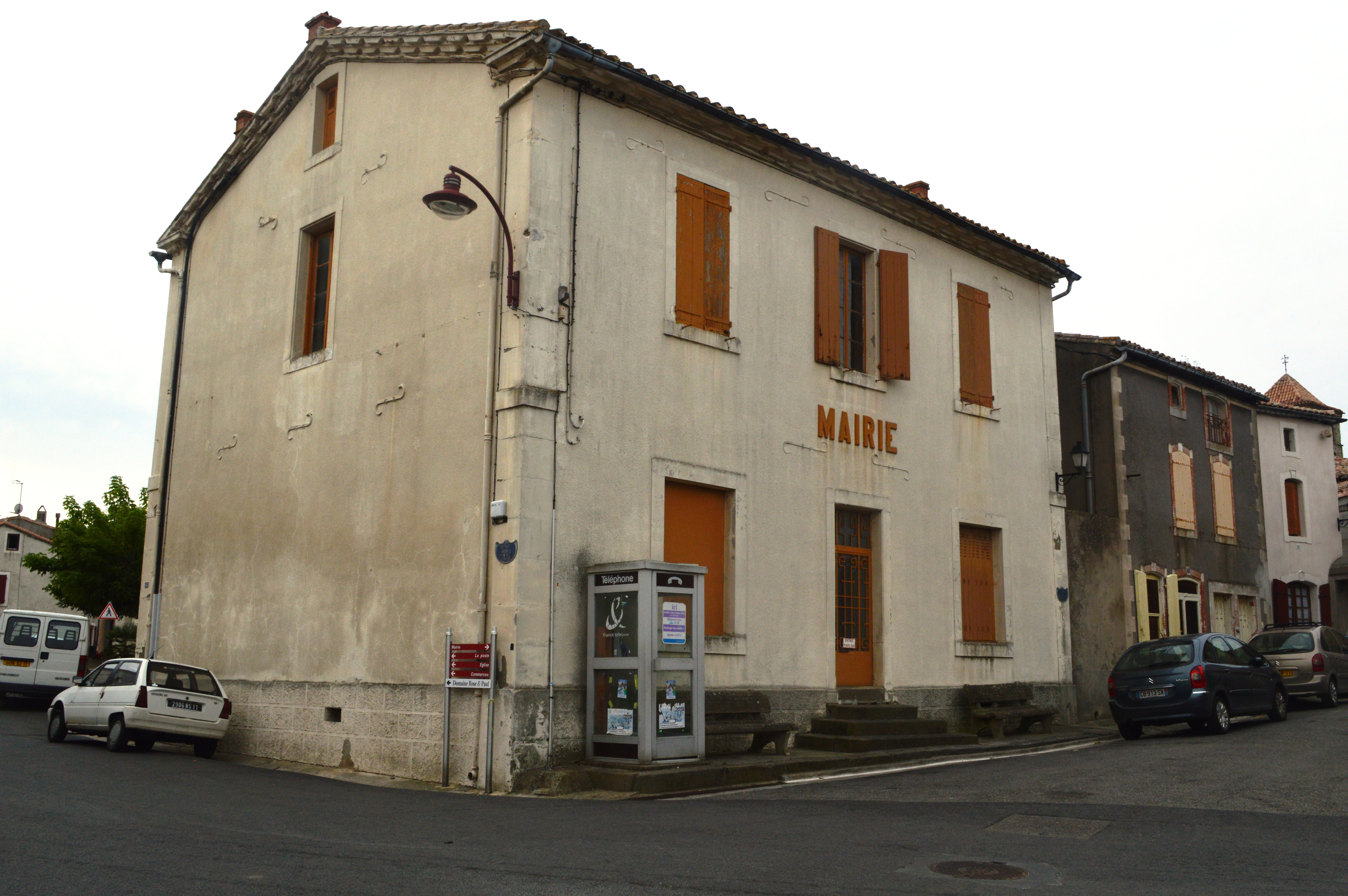
- The old Town Hall

- Coat of arms
- Location of Arzens
- Location within France Location within Occitanie
- Coordinates: 43°12′00″N 2°13′00″E
- Country: France
- Region: Occitania
- Department: Aude
- Arrondissement: Carcassonne
- Canton: La Malepère à la Montagne Noire
- Intercommunality: Carcassonne Agglo

Government
  - Mayor (2020–2026): Jean-Claude Pistre
- Area^{1}: 21.11 km^{2} (8.15 sq mi)
- Elevation: 181 m (594 ft)
- Highest elevation: 425 m (1,394 ft)
- Lowest elevation: 125 m (410 ft)
- Population (2023): 1,174
  - Density: 55.61/km^{2} (144.0/sq mi)
- Time zone: UTC+01:00 (CET)
  - Summer (DST): UTC+02:00 (CEST)
- INSEE/Postal code: 11018 /11290
- ^{1} French Land Register data, which excludes lakes, ponds, glaciers > 1 km^{2} (0.386 sq mi or 247 acres) and river estuaries.

Arzens (French pronunciation: [aʁzɛ̃s]) is a commune in the Aude department in the Occitanie region of southern France.

== Geography ==
Arzens is located in the urban area of Carcassonne some 11 km west of the city. Access to the commune is by road D119 from Carcassonne passing west through the north of the commune and continuing to Montréal. Access to the town is by road D38 from Sainte-Eulalie in the north to the town, by road D35 from Villesèquelande in the north-east, and by road D211 from Lavalette in the east which continues to join the D119 in the commune. The D43 road from Montreal in the west to Montclar in the south-east passes through the south of the commune. Road D911 goes south from the town to join the D43 in the commune. The A61 autoroute (European route E80) (Autoroute des Deux Mers) passes through the north of the commune but has no exit with the nearest being Exit 22 at Bram in the west or Exit 23 for Carcassonne west to the east. The south of the commune is mostly forest with the rest of the commune farmland and residential area around the town.

Numerous streams rise in the commune and flow north to join the Canal du Midi which passes east–west north of the commune. From west to east there are the Ruisseau de Saint-Pietre, the Ruisseau de la Mialauque, the Ruisseau de Falga, the Ruisseau d'Aribaud, the Ruisseau de Fontasse, and the Ruisseau du Saut which forms much of the eastern border of the commune.

=== Heraldry ===
Arms of Arzens	Blazon: Argent, the letter A in Gules.

== Administration ==
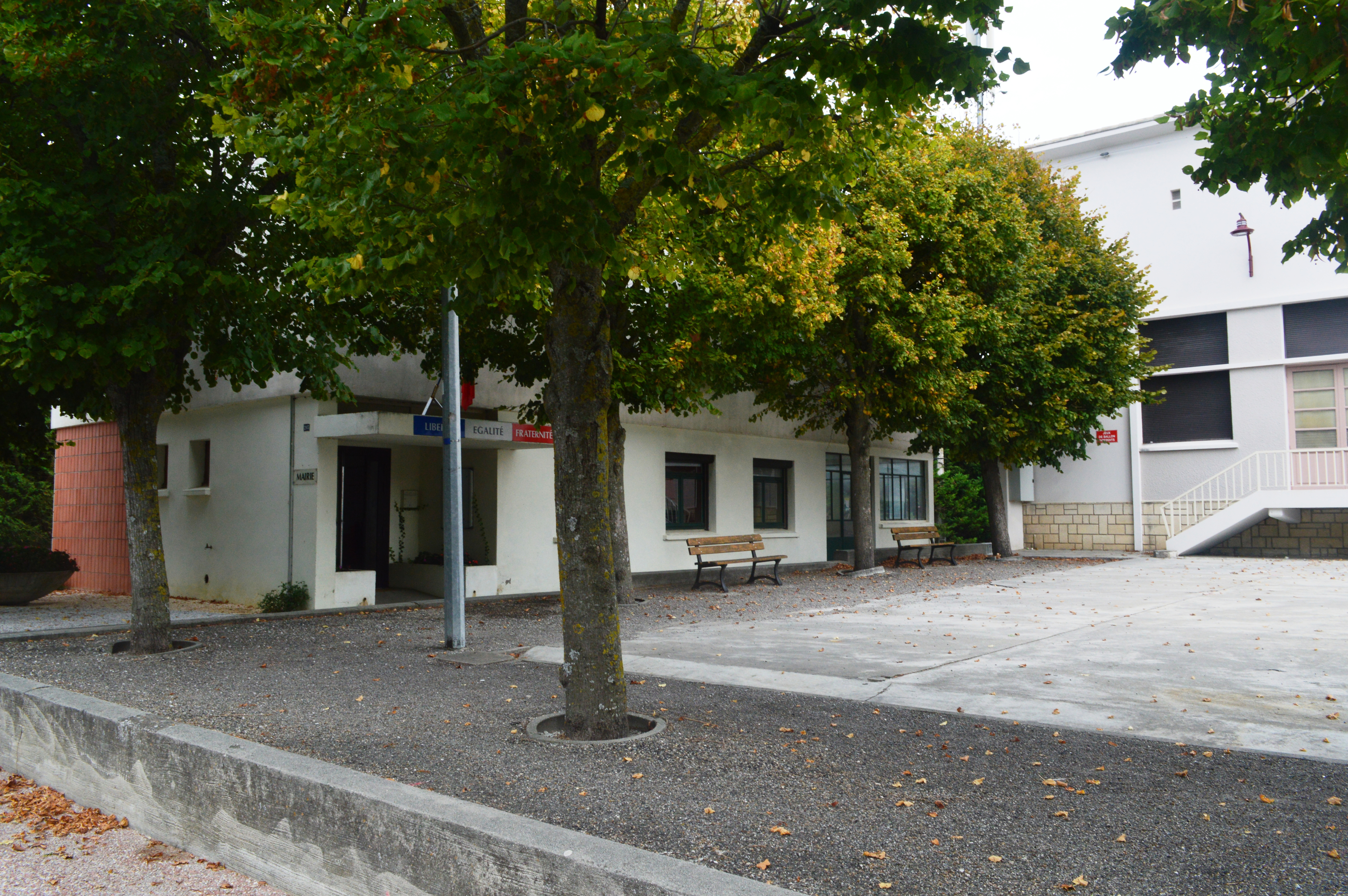
The Town Hall

List of Successive Mayors

From	To	Name
2001	2008	André Gol
2008	2026	Jean-Claude Pistre

=== Twinning ===
Arzens has twinning associations with:

- Hattenheim (Germany) since 1963.
- Fontanile (Italy) since 1980.

== Demography ==
The inhabitants of the commune are known as Arzenais or Arzenaises in French.

Historical population

Year	Pop.	±% p.a.
1793	902	—
1800	813	−1.47%
1806	832	+0.39%
1821	958	+0.94%
1831	932	−0.27%
1836	1,037	+2.16%
1841	1,011	−0.51%
1846	1,054	+0.84%
1851	1,088	+0.64%
1856	971	−2.25%
1861	945	−0.54%
1866	895	−1.08%
1872	867	−0.53%
1876	909	+1.19%
1881	1,022	+2.37%
1886	1,172	+2.78%
1891	1,083	−1.57%
1896	1,167	+1.51%
1901	1,173	+0.10%

Year	Pop.	±% p.a.
1906	1,166	−0.12%
1911	1,070	−1.70%
1921	1,074	+0.04%
1926	1,049	−0.47%
1931	1,253	+3.62%
1936	1,094	−2.68%
1946	1,020	−0.70%
1954	1,007	−0.16%
1962	989	−0.23%
1968	966	−0.39%
1975	833	−2.09%
1982	933	+1.63%
1990	971	+0.50%
1999	1,003	+0.36%
2007	1,126	+1.46%
2012	1,185	+1.03%
2017	1,238	+0.88%
2023	1,174	−0.88%

Source: EHESS and INSEE

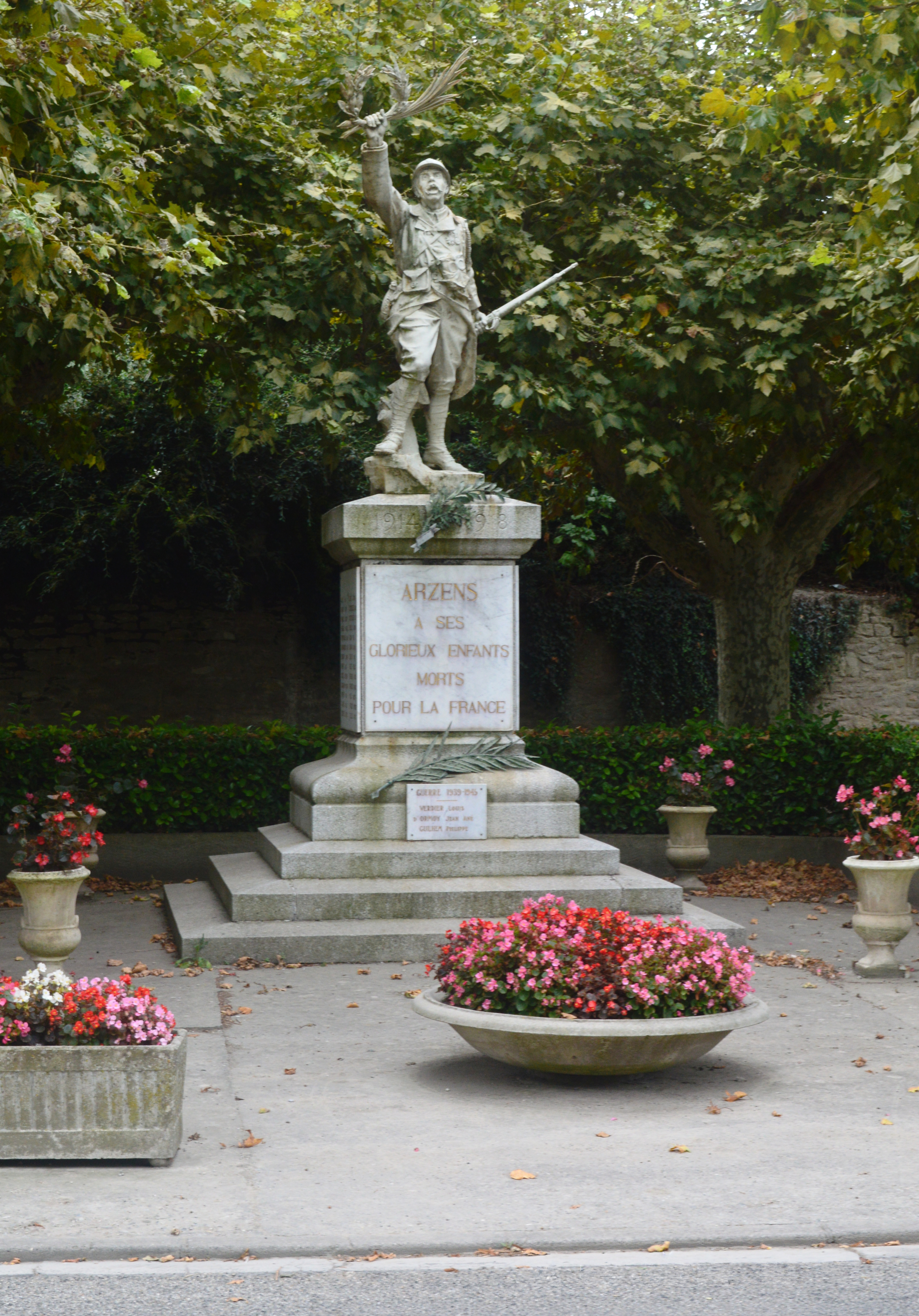
Arzens War Memorial

== Culture and heritage ==
=== Civil heritage ===
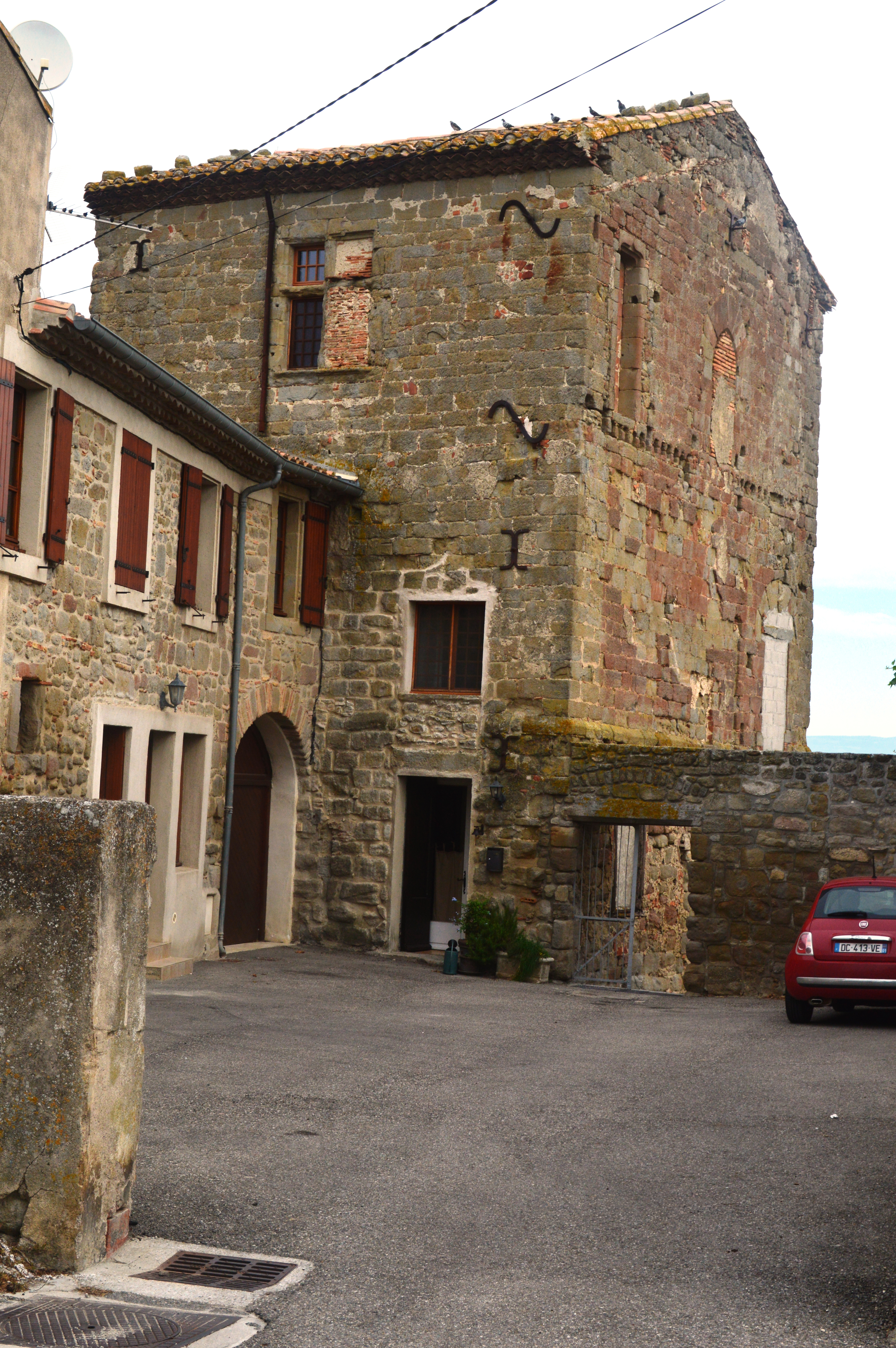
Arzens Chateau

Arzens have several structures that are registered as historical monuments. These are:

- Chateau (15th century)
- War Memorial at the Promenade (First World War)
- Fountain of the Republic in the Place de la Mairie (19th century)

=== Religious heritage ===
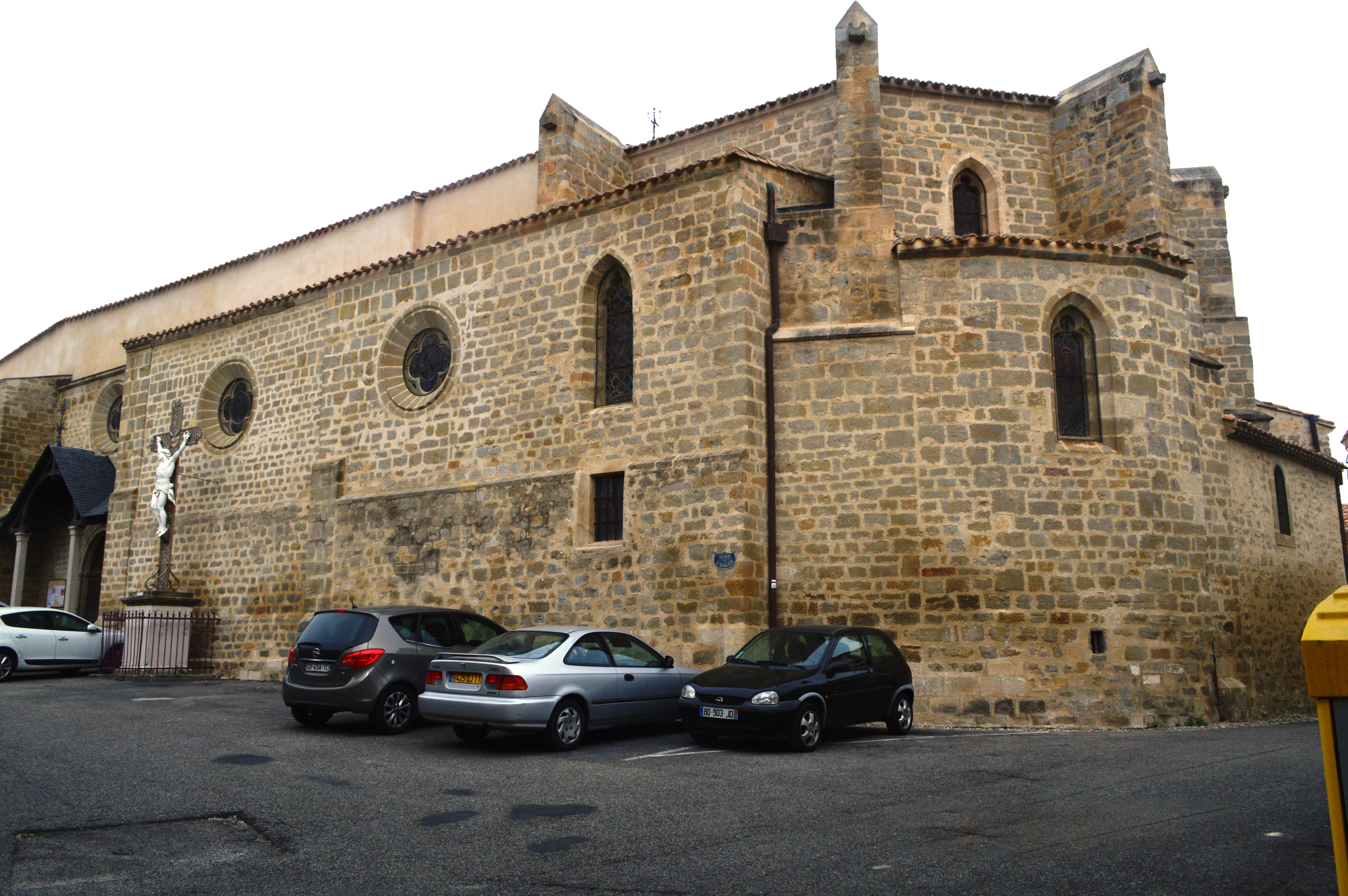
The Church of Saint-Genès

Several structures and objects have been registered as historical monuments. These are:

- Monumental Cross (1649)
- Monument to Saint Dominique
- Church of Saint-Genès (13th century) The church contains many objects registered as historical objects. These are:
  - Altar cross (17th century)
  - Reliquary-Monstrance of Saint Roch (18th century)
  - Bronze Bell (16th century)
  - Incense holder and Thurible (19th century)
  - Casket for holy oil (18th century)
  - Ciborium (18th century)
  - Chalice with Paten (18th century)

Arzens is a stage on the Way of St. James.

== Notable people linked to the commune ==
- Jean-François de la Rocque de Roberval, Lord of Arzens (close to François I, friend of François Rabelais, head of the last expedition by Jacques Cartier to Québec)
- Achille Laugé, born at Arzens in 1861, died at Cailhau in 1944, pointillist painter, friend of Aristide Maillol

== See also ==
- Communes of the Aude department
