= Canton of La Malepère à la Montagne Noire =

Coordinates: 43.20°N 2.14°E

La Malepère à la Montagne Noire
- Canton
- Interactive map of La Malepère à la Montagne Noire
- Country: France
- Region: Occitania
- Department: Aude
- No. of communes: {{{nbcomm}}}

Government
  - Representatives (2021–2028): Chloé Danillon; Paul Griffe
- Area: 413.29 km^{2} (159.57 sq mi)
- Population (2023): 17,796
  - Density: 43.059/km^{2} (111.52/sq mi)
- INSEE code: 11 10

The canton of La Malepère à la Montagne Noire (before 2015: canton of Montréal) is an administrative division of the Aude department, southern France. Its borders were modified at the French canton reorganisation which came into effect in March 2015. Its seat is in Montréal.

== Composition ==
It consists of the following communes:

1. Alzonne
2. Arzens
3. Brousses-et-Villaret
4. Les Brunels
5. Carlipa
6. Caux-et-Sauzens
7. Cenne-Monestiés
8. Cuxac-Cabardès
9. Fontiers-Cabardès
10. Fraisse-Cabardès
11. Labécède-Lauragais
12. Lacombe
13. Laprade
14. Montolieu
15. Montréal
16. Moussoulens
17. Pezens
18. Raissac-sur-Lampy
19. Saint-Denis
20. Sainte-Eulalie
21. Saint-Martin-le-Vieil
22. Saissac
23. Verdun-en-Lauragais
24. Villemagne
25. Villeneuve-lès-Montréal
26. Villesèquelande
27. Villespy

== Councillors ==
Election	Councillors	Party	Occupation
2015	Régis Banquet	PS	Mayor of Alzonne
2015	Stéphanie Hortala	PS	Head of Service
2021	Chloé Danillon	PS	Former Councillor of Carcassonne-1
2021	Paul Griffe	PS	Mayor of Cuxac-Cabardès

== Pictures of the canton ==
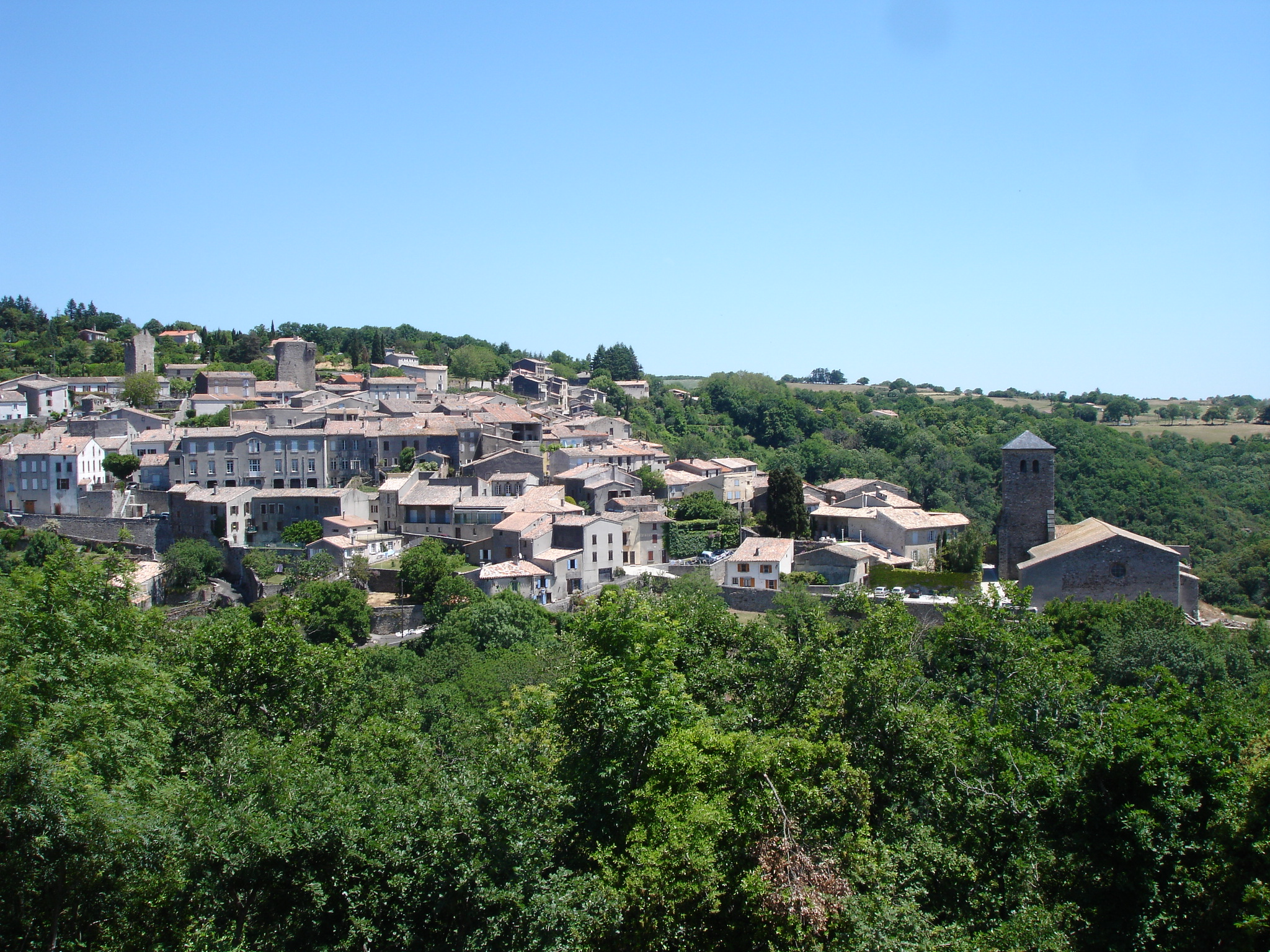
View of Saissac

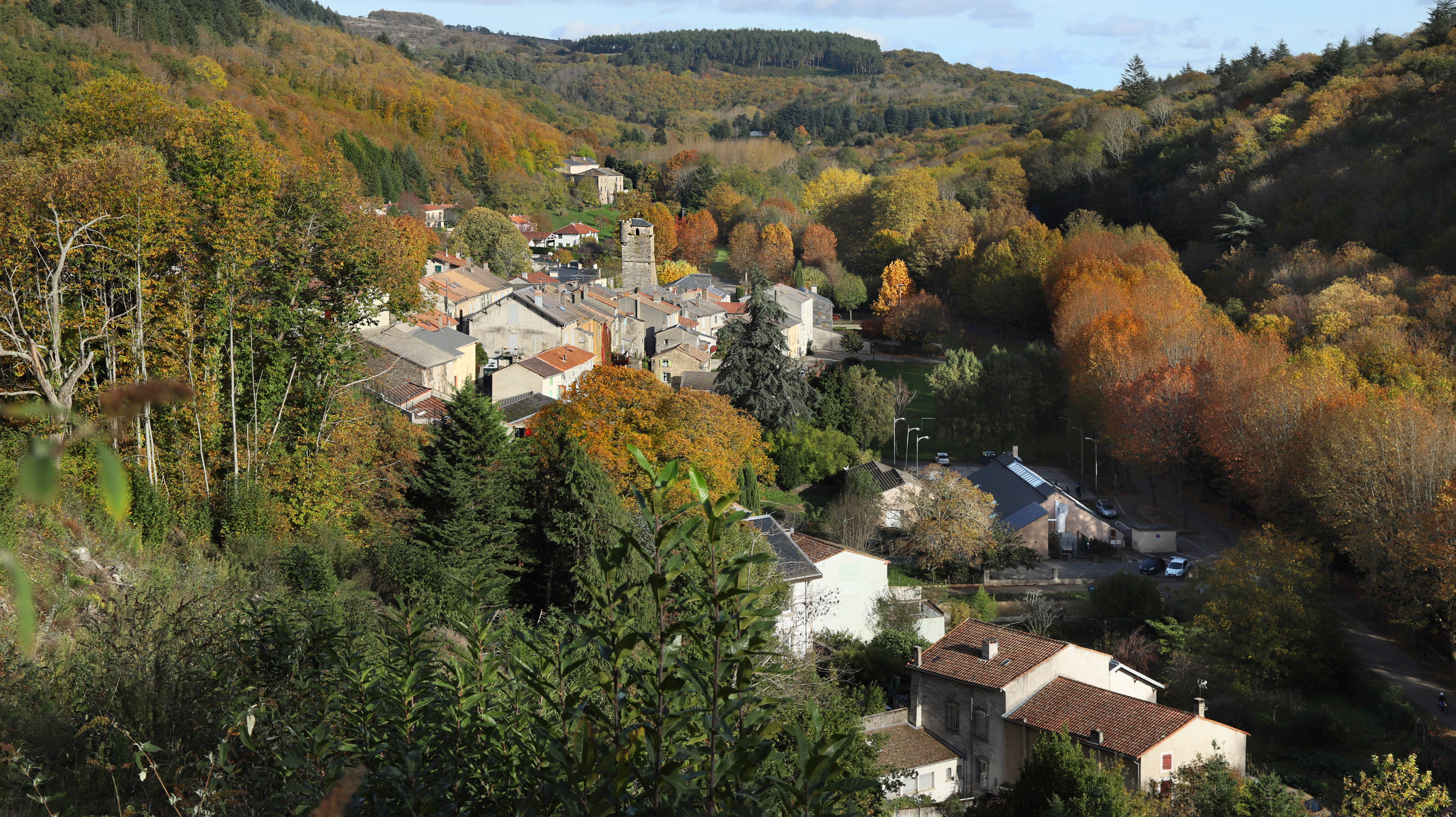
View of Cuxac-Cabardès

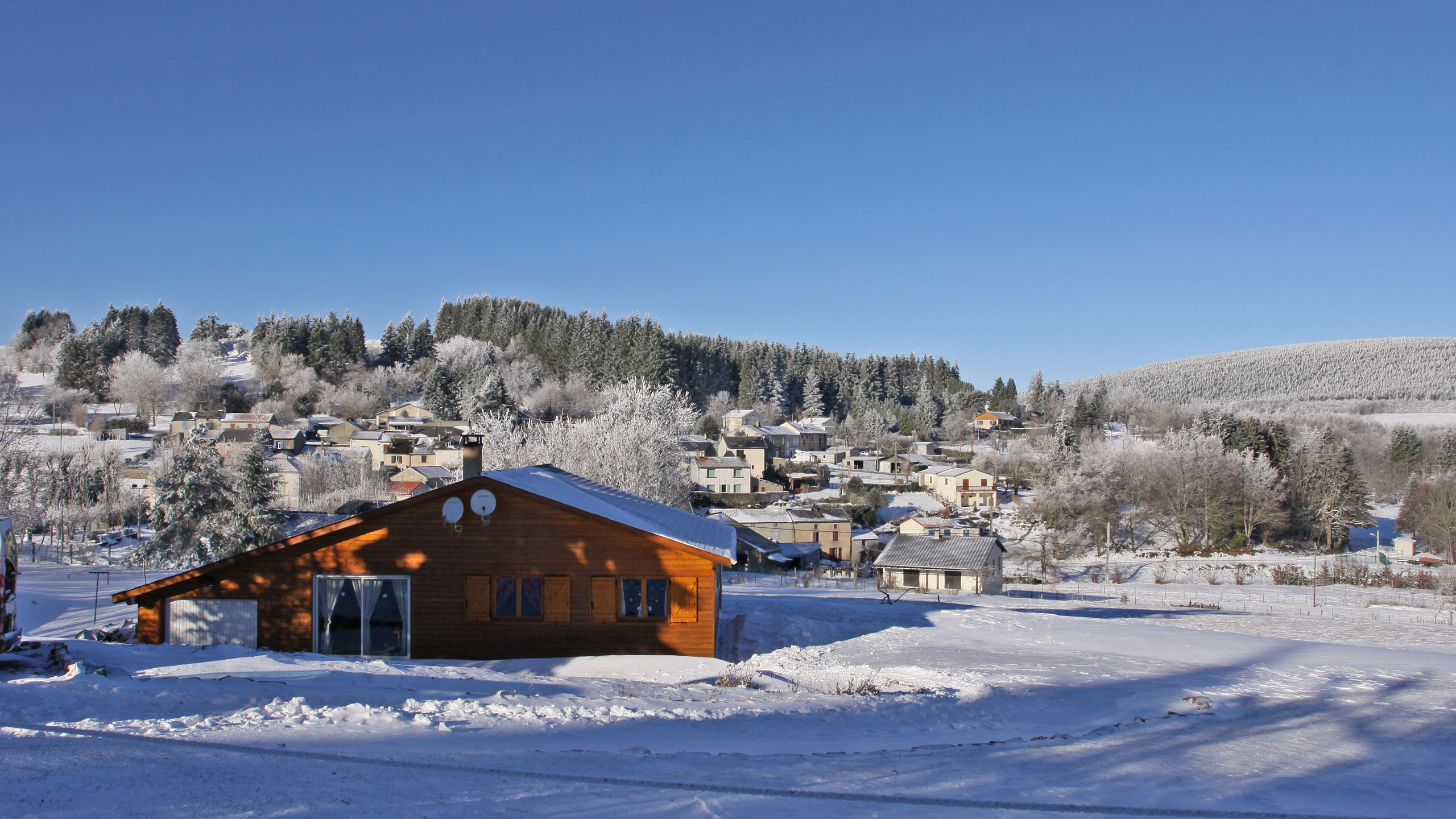
View of Laprade
