= Château d'Arzens =

Castle in Arzens, France

Coordinates: 43°11′59.5″N 2°12′35″E

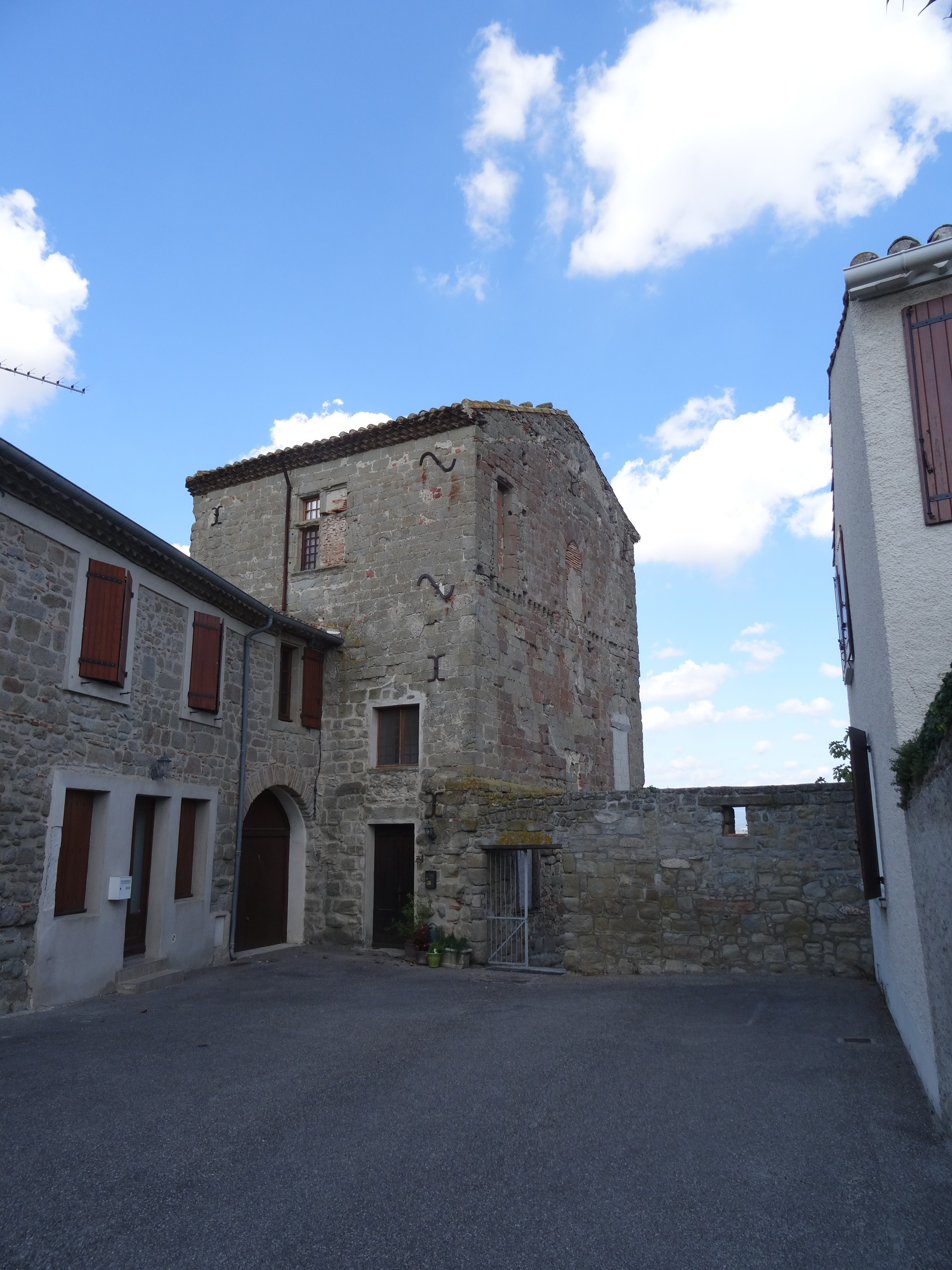
Castle of Arzens

The Château d'Arzens is a castle in the commune of Arzens in the Aude département of France. The castle dates from the 15th and 16th centuries.

The castle is privately owned. It has been listed since 1948 as a monument historique by the French Ministry of Culture.

== History ==
In 1574, following the Peace of La Rochelle which ended the fourth stage of the French Wars of Religion, the Huguenots seized the village. In 1591, members of the Catholic League moved on Arzens and, after a long hard fought siege, captured it. The village and the castle were burnt down and razed, the church burned. Only a single tower of the castle survived the blaze.

== See also ==
- List of castles in France
