= Verdun-en-Lauragais =

Commune in Occitanie, France

- Commune
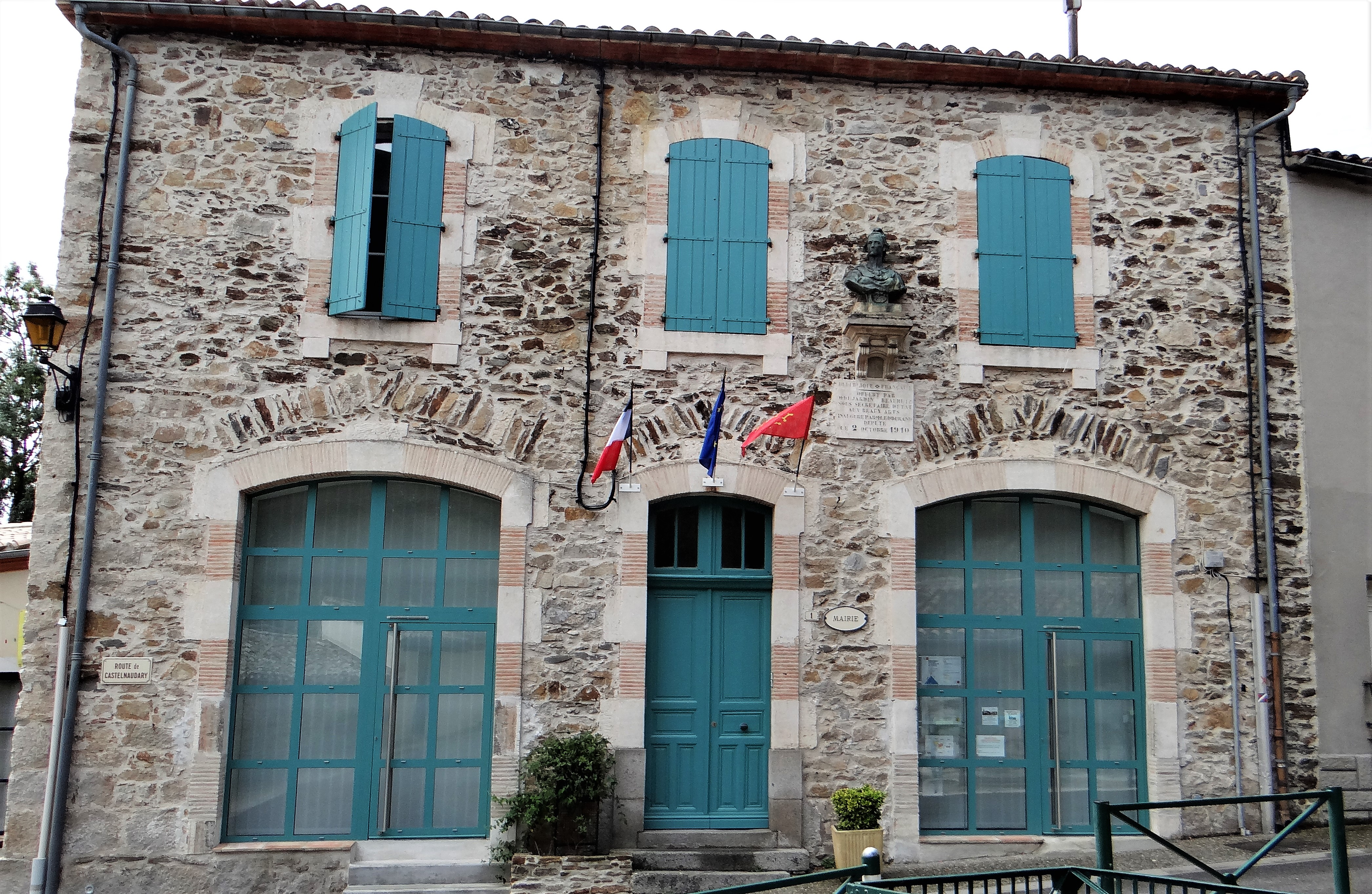
- The town hall in Verdun-en-Lauragais

- Coat of arms
- Location of Verdun-en-Lauragais
- Location within France Location within Occitanie
- Coordinates: 43°21′59″N 2°03′36″E
- Country: France
- Region: Occitania
- Department: Aude
- Arrondissement: Carcassonne
- Canton: La Malepère à la Montagne Noire
- Intercommunality: Castelnaudary Lauragais Audois

Government
  - Mayor (2020–2026): Monique Vidal
- Area^{1}: 20.21 km^{2} (7.80 sq mi)
- Elevation: 333 m (1,093 ft)
- Highest elevation: 613 m (2,011 ft)
- Lowest elevation: 198 m (650 ft)
- Population (2023): 290
  - Density: 14/km^{2} (37/sq mi)
- Time zone: UTC+01:00 (CET)
  - Summer (DST): UTC+02:00 (CEST)
- INSEE/Postal code: 11407 /11400
- ^{1} French Land Register data, which excludes lakes, ponds, glaciers > 1 km^{2} (0.386 sq mi or 247 acres) and river estuaries.

Verdun-en-Lauragais (French pronunciation: [vɛʁdœ̃ ɑ̃ loʁaɡɛ], literally Verdun in Lauragais; Occitan: Verdun de Lauragués, before 1958: Verdun) is a commune in the Aude department in southern France.

== Population ==
Historical population
| Year | Pop. | ±% p.a. |
|---|---|---|
| 1968 | 233 | — |
| 1975 | 219 | −0.88% |
| 1982 | 216 | −0.20% |
| 1990 | 212 | −0.23% |
| 1999 | 231 | +0.96% |
| 2007 | 251 | +1.04% |
| 2012 | 274 | +1.77% |
| 2017 | 273 | −0.07% |
| 2023 | 290 | +1.01% |
Source: INSEE

== See also ==
- Communes of the Aude department
