= Les Brunels =

Commune in Occitanie, France

- Commune
- Coat of arms
- Location of Les Brunels
- Location within France Location within Occitanie
- Coordinates: 43°24′16″N 2°03′01″E
- Country: France
- Region: Occitania
- Department: Aude
- Arrondissement: Carcassonne
- Canton: La Malepère à la Montagne Noire
- Intercommunality: CC aux sources du Canal du Midi

Government
  - Mayor (2020–2026): Philippe de Lorbeau
- Area^{1}: 11.97 km^{2} (4.62 sq mi)
- Elevation: 580 m (1,900 ft)
- Highest elevation: 631 m (2,070 ft)
- Lowest elevation: 349 m (1,145 ft)
- Population (2023): 268
  - Density: 22.4/km^{2} (58.0/sq mi)
- Time zone: UTC+01:00 (CET)
  - Summer (DST): UTC+02:00 (CEST)
- INSEE/Postal code: 11054 /11400
- ^{1} French Land Register data, which excludes lakes, ponds, glaciers > 1 km^{2} (0.386 sq mi or 247 acres) and river estuaries.

Les Brunels (French pronunciation: [le bʁynɛl]; Occitan: Les Brunèls) is a commune in the Aude department in southern France.

== Population ==
Historical population
Year	Pop.	±% p.a.
1968	153	—
1975	137	−1.57%
1982	161	+2.33%
1990	147	−1.13%
1999	162	+1.09%
2007	214	+3.54%
2012	251	+3.24%
2017	273	+1.69%
2023	268	−0.31%
Source: INSEE

== See also ==
- Communes of the Aude department
