= Fontiers-Cabardès =

Commune in Occitanie, France

- Commune
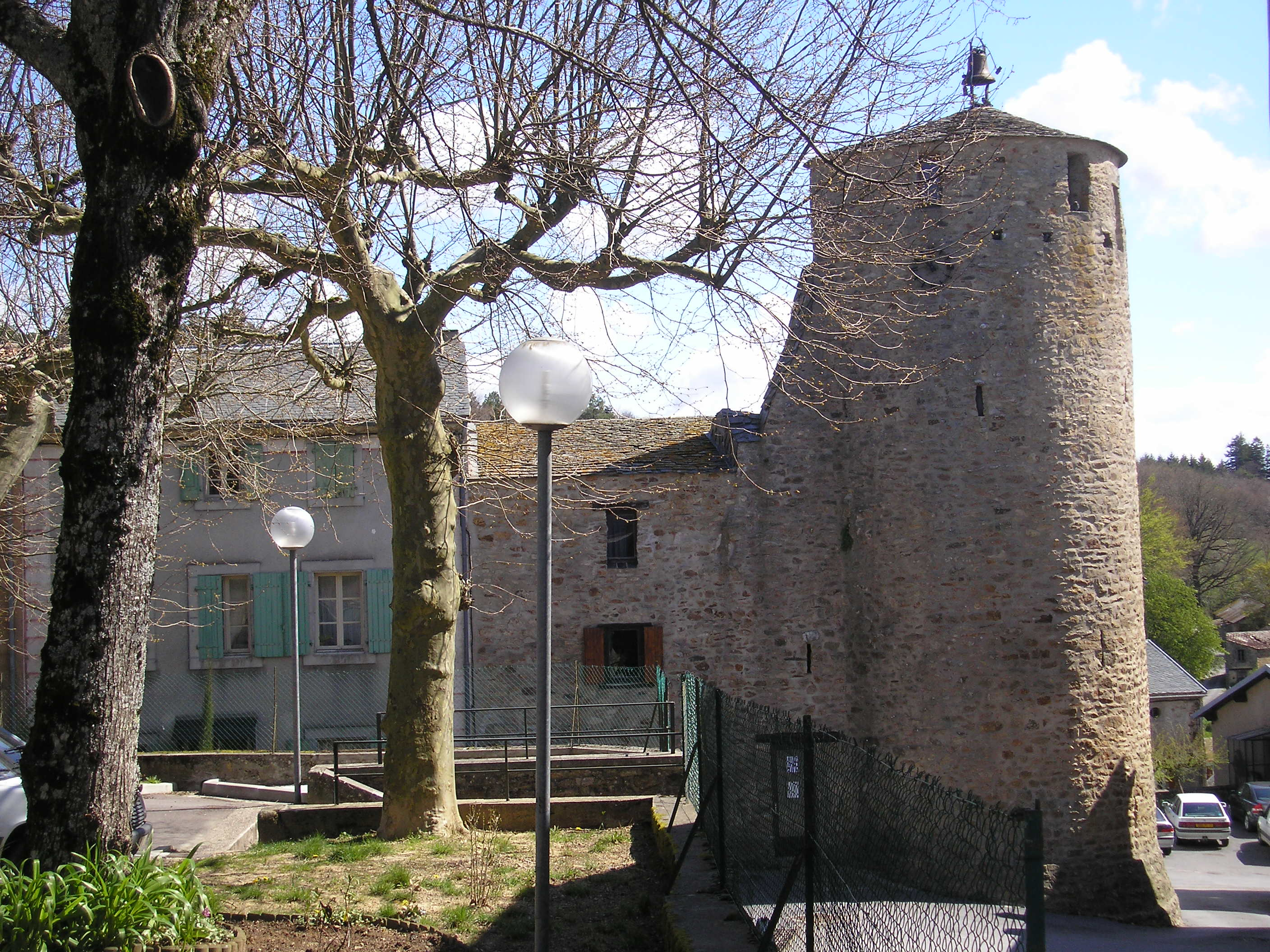
- The clock tower in Fontiers-Cabardès

- Coat of arms
- Location of Fontiers-Cabardès
- Location within France Location within Occitanie
- Coordinates: 43°22′14″N 2°14′55″E
- Country: France
- Region: Occitania
- Department: Aude
- Arrondissement: Carcassonne
- Canton: La Malepère à la Montagne Noire
- Intercommunality: Montagne Noire

Government
  - Mayor (2020–2026): Gilbert Plagnes
- Area^{1}: 8.46 km^{2} (3.27 sq mi)
- Highest elevation: 803 m (2,635 ft)
- Lowest elevation: 438 m (1,437 ft)
- Population (2023): 476
  - Density: 56.3/km^{2} (146/sq mi)
- Time zone: UTC+01:00 (CET)
  - Summer (DST): UTC+02:00 (CEST)
- INSEE/Postal code: 11150 /11390
- ^{1} French Land Register data, which excludes lakes, ponds, glaciers > 1 km^{2} (0.386 sq mi or 247 acres) and river estuaries.

Fontiers-Cabardès (French pronunciation: [fɔ̃tje kabaʁdɛs]; Occitan: Fontiès Cabardés) is a commune in the Aude department in southern France.

== Population ==
Historical population
Year	Pop.	±% p.a.
1968	205	—
1975	245	+2.58%
1982	307	+3.28%
1990	306	−0.04%
1999	324	+0.64%
2007	419	+3.27%
2012	440	+0.98%
2017	454	+0.63%
2023	476	+0.79%
Source: INSEE

== See also ==
- Communes of the Aude department
