= Cenne-Monestiés =

Commune in Occitanie, France

- Commune
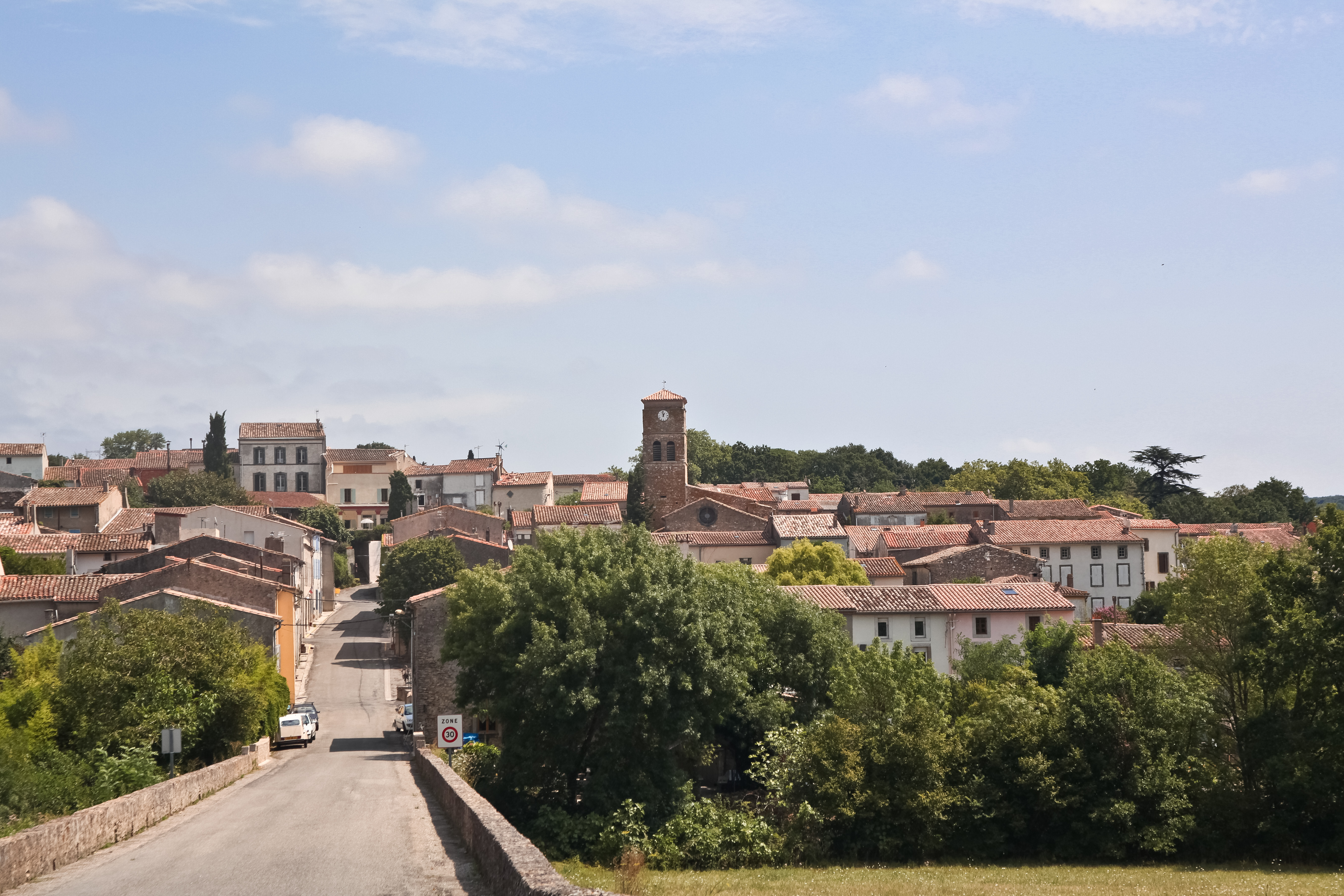
- A general view of Cenne-Monestiés

- Coat of arms
- Location of Cenne-Monestiés
- Location within France Location within Occitanie
- Coordinates: 43°19′58″N 2°07′06″E
- Country: France
- Region: Occitania
- Department: Aude
- Arrondissement: Carcassonne
- Canton: La Malepère à la Montagne Noire

Government
  - Mayor (2020–2026): José Froment
- Area^{1}: 7.76 km^{2} (3.00 sq mi)
- Elevation: 180 m (590 ft)
- Highest elevation: 310 m (1,020 ft)
- Lowest elevation: 145 m (476 ft)
- Population (2023): 413
  - Density: 53.2/km^{2} (138/sq mi)
- Time zone: UTC+01:00 (CET)
  - Summer (DST): UTC+02:00 (CEST)
- INSEE/Postal code: 11089 /11170
- ^{1} French Land Register data, which excludes lakes, ponds, glaciers > 1 km^{2} (0.386 sq mi or 247 acres) and river estuaries.

Cenne-Monestiés (French pronunciation: [sɛn mɔnɛstje]; Occitan: Cena Monestièrs) is a commune in the Aude department in southern France.

The film Departure (2015), starring Juliet Stevenson, Alex Lawther and Phénix Brossard, was filmed on location in the village.

== Population ==
Historical population
Year	Pop.	±% p.a.
1968	332	—
1975	322	−0.44%
1982	309	−0.59%
1990	285	−1.01%
1999	310	+0.94%
2007	316	+0.24%
2012	389	+4.24%
2017	401	+0.61%
2023	413	+0.49%
Source: INSEE

== See also ==
- Communes of the Aude department
