= Laprade, Aude =

Commune in Occitanie, France

Laprade
- Commune
- Coat of arms
- Location of Laprade
- Location within France Location within Occitanie
- Coordinates: 43°26′35″N 2°15′33″E
- Country: France
- Region: Occitania
- Department: Aude
- Arrondissement: Carcassonne
- Canton: La Malepère à la Montagne Noire

Government
  - Mayor (2020–2026): David Albert
- Area^{1}: 4.61 km^{2} (1.78 sq mi)
- Elevation: 850 m (2,790 ft)
- Highest elevation: 900 m (3,000 ft)
- Lowest elevation: 775 m (2,543 ft)
- Population (2023): 122
  - Density: 26.5/km^{2} (68.5/sq mi)
- Time zone: UTC+01:00 (CET)
  - Summer (DST): UTC+02:00 (CEST)
- INSEE/Postal code: 11189 /11390
- ^{1} French Land Register data, which excludes lakes, ponds, glaciers > 1 km^{2} (0.386 sq mi or 247 acres) and river estuaries.

Laprade (French pronunciation: [lapʁad]; Occitan: La Prada) is a commune in the Aude department in southern France.

== Population ==
Historical population
Year	Pop.	±% p.a.
1968	116	—
1975	104	−1.55%
1982	78	−4.03%
1990	75	−0.49%
1999	80	+0.72%
2007	90	+1.48%
2012	82	−1.84%
2017	95	+2.99%
2023	122	+4.26%
Source: INSEE

== See also ==
- Communes of the Aude department
