= Pezens =

Commune in Occitanie, France

- Commune
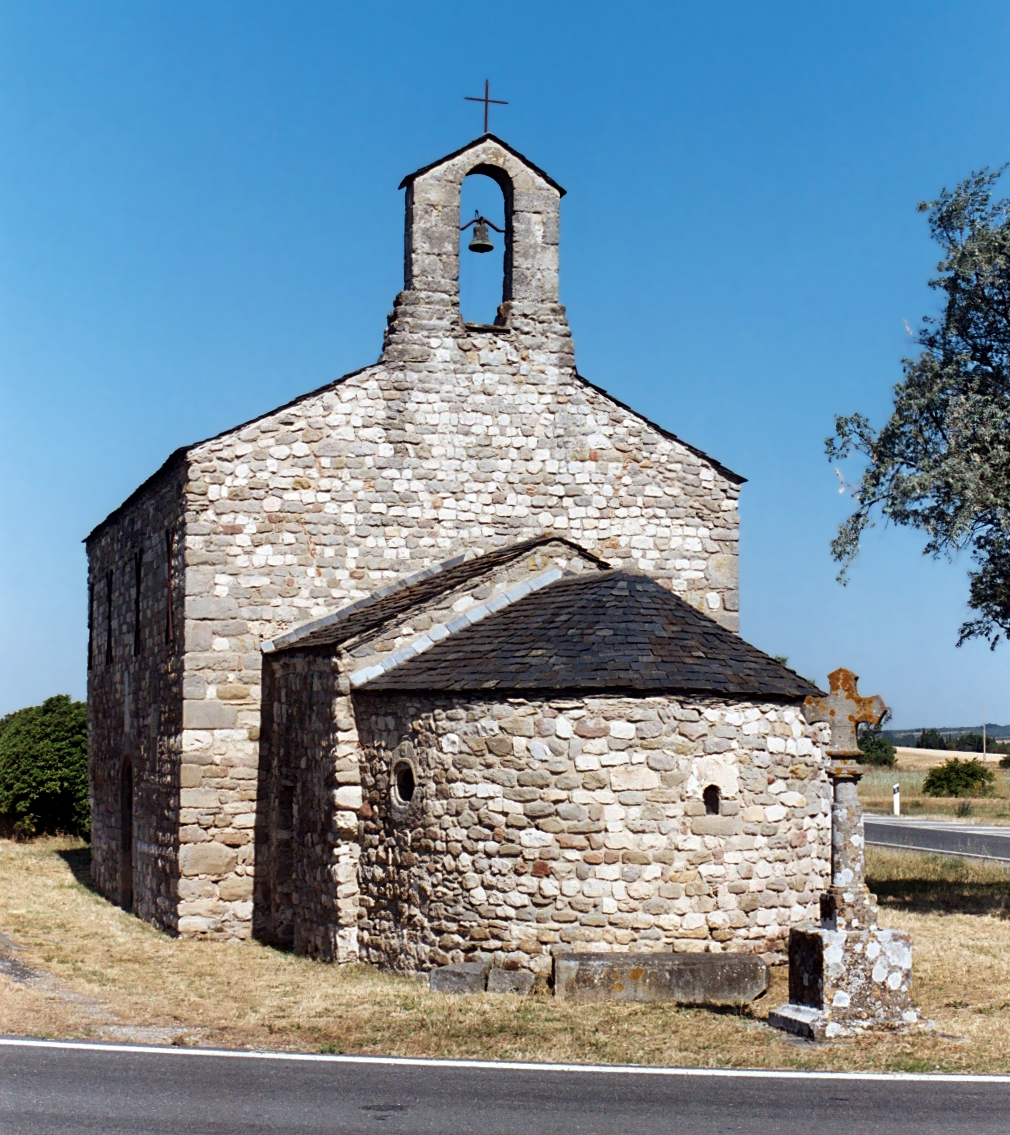
- The chapel in Pezens

- Coat of arms
- Location of Pezens
- Location within France Location within Occitanie
- Coordinates: 43°15′19″N 2°15′57″E
- Country: France
- Region: Occitania
- Department: Aude
- Arrondissement: Carcassonne
- Canton: La Malepère à la Montagne Noire
- Intercommunality: Carcassonne Agglo

Government
  - Mayor (2020–2026): Philippe Fau
- Area^{1}: 11.11 km^{2} (4.29 sq mi)
- Elevation: 117 m (384 ft)
- Highest elevation: 154 m (505 ft)
- Lowest elevation: 103 m (338 ft)
- Population (2023): 1,611
  - Density: 145.0/km^{2} (375.6/sq mi)
- Time zone: UTC+01:00 (CET)
  - Summer (DST): UTC+02:00 (CEST)
- INSEE/Postal code: 11288 /11170
- ^{1} French Land Register data, which excludes lakes, ponds, glaciers > 1 km^{2} (0.386 sq mi or 247 acres) and river estuaries.

Pezens (French pronunciation: [pəzɛ̃s]; Occitan: Pesens) is a commune in the Aude department in southern France.

== Population ==
Historical population
Year	Pop.	±% p.a.
1968	934	—
1975	1,212	+3.79%
1982	1,087	−1.54%
1990	1,090	+0.03%
1999	1,114	+0.24%
2007	1,242	+1.37%
2012	1,367	+1.94%
2017	1,525	+2.21%
2023	1,611	+0.92%
Source: INSEE

The inhabitants are known as Pezenois in French.

== See also ==
- Communes of the Aude department
