= Villemagne =

Commune in Occitanie, France

- Commune
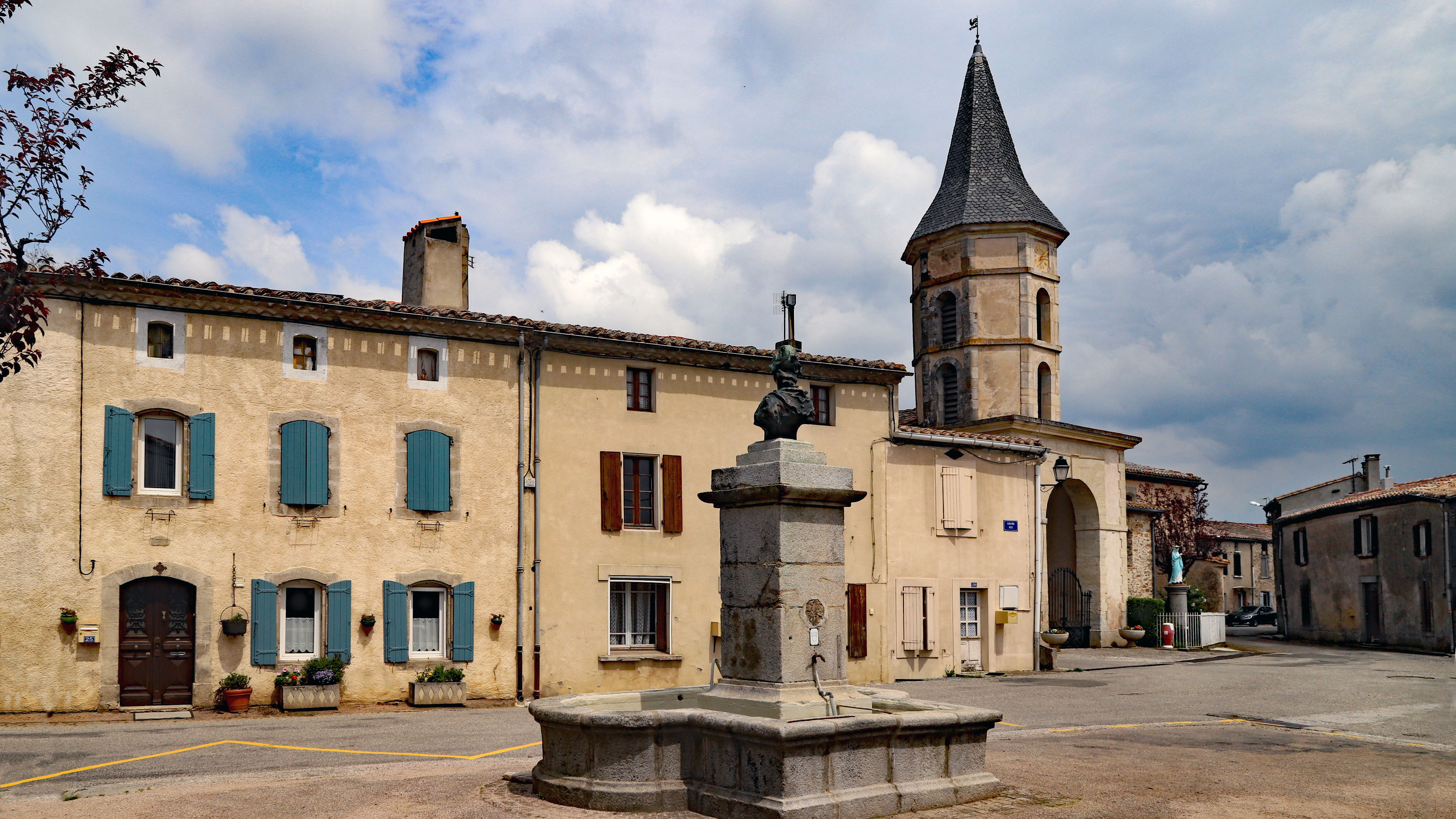
- Villemagne Town hall

- Coat of arms
- Location of Villemagne
- Location within France Location within Occitanie
- Coordinates: 43°21′34″N 2°06′44″E
- Country: France
- Region: Occitania
- Department: Aude
- Arrondissement: Carcassonne
- Canton: La Malepère à la Montagne Noire

Government
  - Mayor (2020–2026): Hélène Brousse
- Area^{1}: 10.69 km^{2} (4.13 sq mi)
- Elevation: 450 m (1,480 ft)
- Highest elevation: 655 m (2,149 ft)
- Lowest elevation: 206 m (676 ft)
- Population (2023): 236
  - Density: 22.1/km^{2} (57.2/sq mi)
- Time zone: UTC+01:00 (CET)
  - Summer (DST): UTC+02:00 (CEST)
- INSEE/Postal code: 11428 /11310
- ^{1} French Land Register data, which excludes lakes, ponds, glaciers > 1 km^{2} (0.386 sq mi or 247 acres) and river estuaries.

Villemagne (French pronunciation: [vilmaɲ]; Occitan: Vilamanha) is a commune in the Aude department in southern France.

== Population ==
Historical population
Year	Pop.	±% p.a.
1968	215	—
1975	208	−0.47%
1982	223	+1.00%
1990	192	−1.85%
1999	211	+1.05%
2007	270	+3.13%
2012	288	+1.30%
2017	261	−1.95%
2023	236	−1.66%
Source: INSEE

== See also ==
- Communes of the Aude department
