= Villeneuve-lès-Montréal =

Commune in Occitanie, France

- Commune
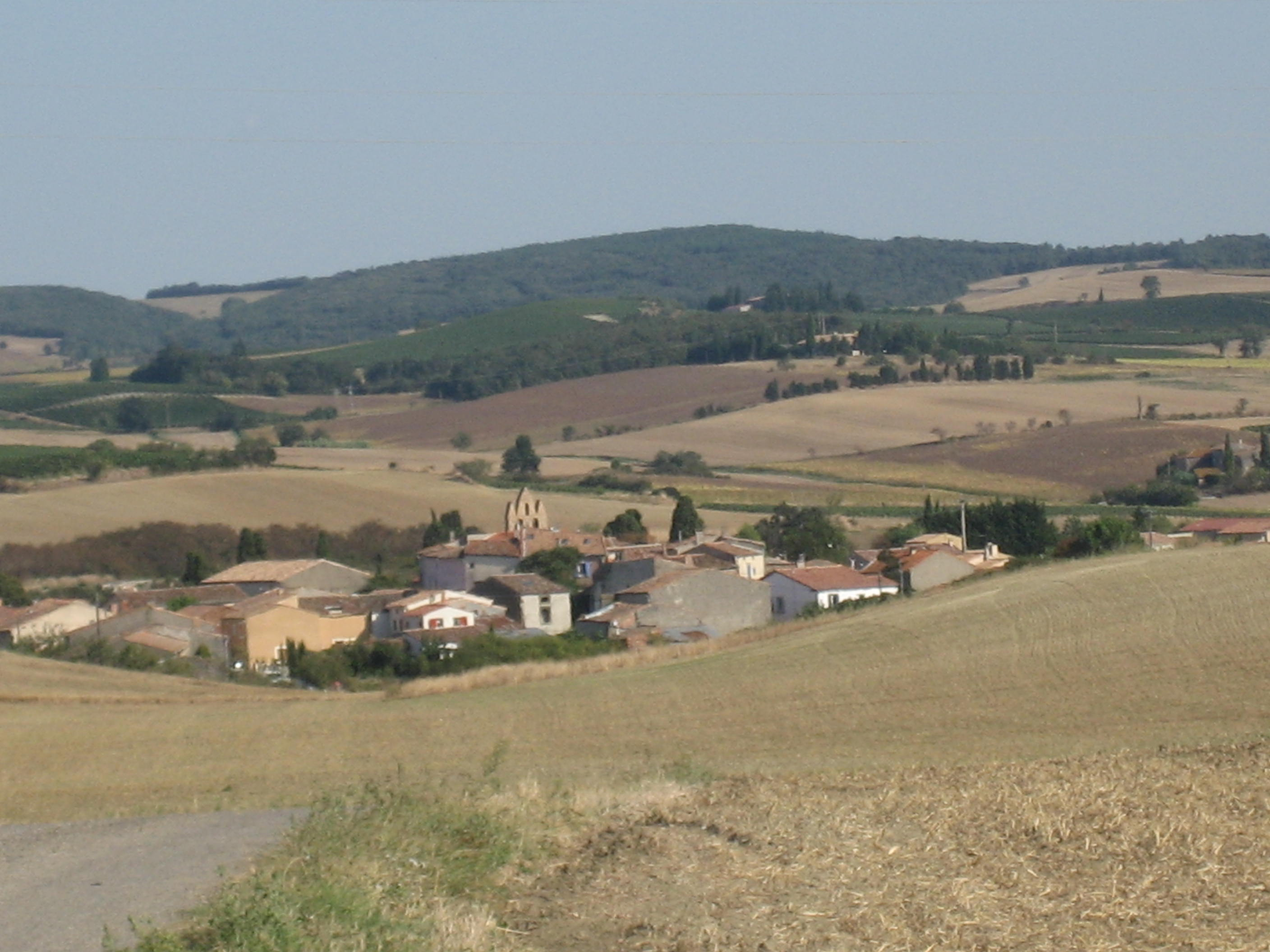
- A general view of Villeneuve-lès-Montréal

- Coat of arms
- Location of Villeneuve-lès-Montréal
- Location within France Location within Occitanie
- Coordinates: 43°10′52″N 2°06′44″E
- Country: France
- Region: Occitania
- Department: Aude
- Arrondissement: Carcassonne
- Canton: La Malepère à la Montagne Noire
- Intercommunality: Piège Lauragais Malepère

Government
  - Mayor (2020–2026): Anne-Marie Mazieres
- Area^{1}: 2.20 km^{2} (0.85 sq mi)
- Elevation: 200 m (660 ft)
- Highest elevation: 250 m (820 ft)
- Lowest elevation: 179 m (587 ft)
- Population (2023): 330
  - Density: 150/km^{2} (390/sq mi)
- Time zone: UTC+01:00 (CET)
  - Summer (DST): UTC+02:00 (CEST)
- INSEE/Postal code: 11432 /11290
- ^{1} French Land Register data, which excludes lakes, ponds, glaciers > 1 km^{2} (0.386 sq mi or 247 acres) and river estuaries.

Villeneuve-lès-Montréal (French pronunciation: [vilnœv lɛ mɔ̃ʁeal]; Occitan: Vilanòva de Montreal) is a commune in the Aude department in southern France.

== Population ==
Historical population
Year	Pop.	±% p.a.
1968	131	—
1975	101	−3.65%
1982	104	+0.42%
1990	101	−0.37%
1999	116	+1.55%
2007	214	+7.96%
2012	261	+4.05%
2017	300	+2.82%
2023	330	+1.60%
Source: INSEE

== See also ==
- Communes of the Aude department
