= Caux-et-Sauzens =

Commune in Occitanie, France

- Commune
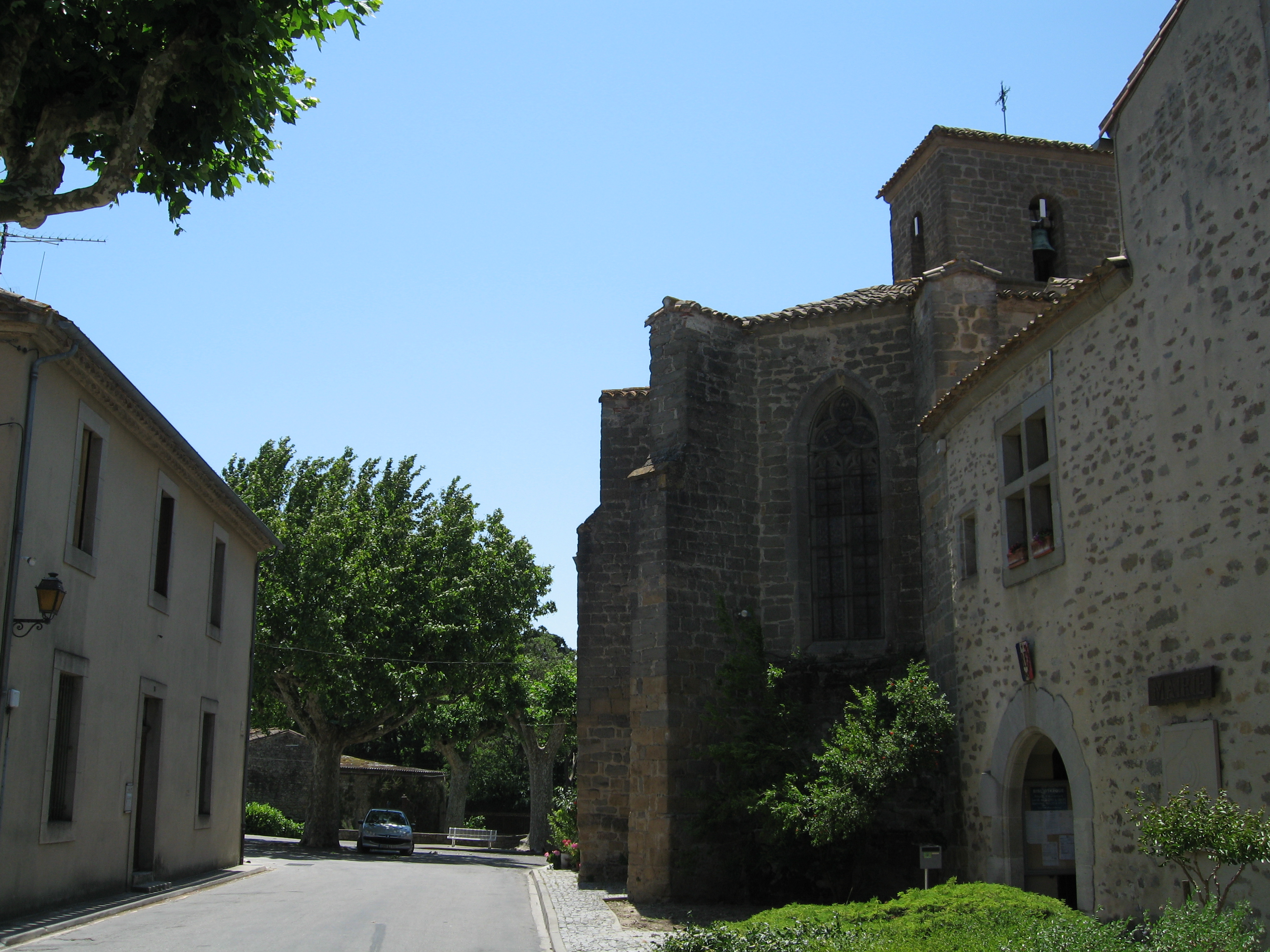
- The town hall and church in Caux-et-Sauzens

- Coat of arms
- Location of Caux-et-Sauzens
- Location within France Location within Occitanie
- Coordinates: 43°13′36″N 2°15′23″E
- Country: France
- Region: Occitania
- Department: Aude
- Arrondissement: Carcassonne
- Canton: La Malepère à la Montagne Noire
- Intercommunality: Carcassonne Agglo

Government
  - Mayor (2020–2026): Geneviève Raboul
- Area^{1}: 9 km^{2} (3.5 sq mi)
- Elevation: 150 m (490 ft)
- Highest elevation: 177 m (581 ft)
- Lowest elevation: 103 m (338 ft)
- Population (2023): 1,025
  - Density: 110/km^{2} (290/sq mi)
- Time zone: UTC+01:00 (CET)
  - Summer (DST): UTC+02:00 (CEST)
- INSEE/Postal code: 11084 /11170
- ^{1} French Land Register data, which excludes lakes, ponds, glaciers > 1 km^{2} (0.386 sq mi or 247 acres) and river estuaries.

Caux-et-Sauzens (French pronunciation: [ko e sozɛ̃s]; Occitan: Caus e Sausens) is a commune in the Aude department in southern France.

Located 8 kilometres west of Carcassonne between the Montagne Noire and Malepère, at the crossroads of the old Roman roads to Toulouse and from Foix towards Ariège and Spain. The Canal du Midi runs between the Village of Caux and the Hamlet of Sauzens. Its inhabitants are known as Cauxois.

== History ==
The hamlet of Sauzens and the village Caux joined to form Caux et Sauzens during the French Revolution in 1791.

== Population ==
Historical population

Year	Pop.	±% p.a.
1793	508	—
1821	507	−0.01%
1846	493	−0.11%
1872	432	−0.51%
1901	551	+0.84%
1926	524	−0.20%
1946	507	−0.16%
1962	450	−0.74%
1968	429	−0.79%

Year	Pop.	±% p.a.
1975	516	+2.67%
1982	594	+2.03%
1990	705	+2.16%
1999	739	+0.52%
2007	770	+0.51%
2012	821	+1.29%
2017	979	+3.58%
2023	1,025	+0.77%

Source: EHESS and INSEE (1968-2023)

== See also ==
- Communes of the Aude department
