= Cuxac-Cabardès =

Commune in Occitanie, France

- Commune
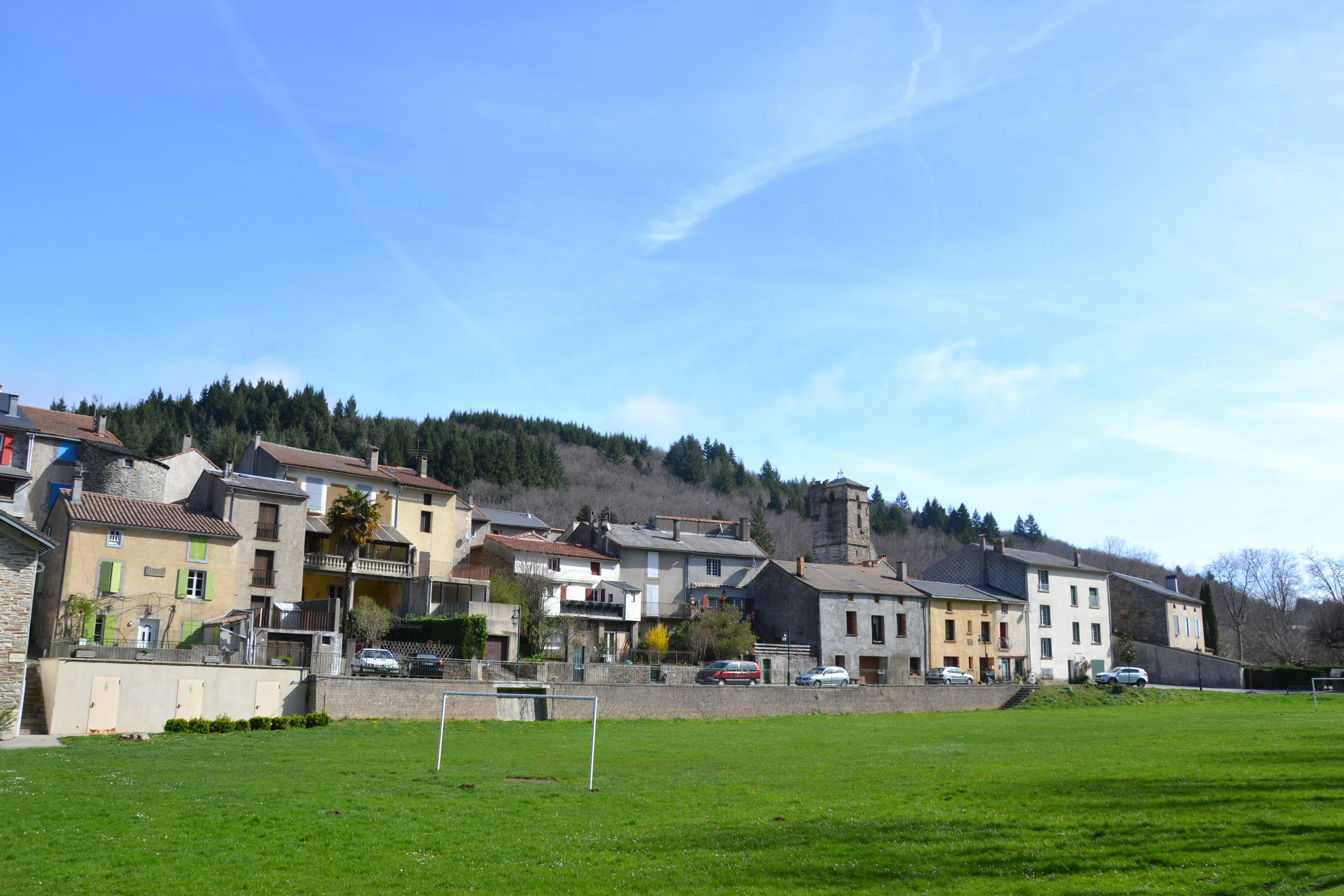
- A general view of Cuxac

- Coat of arms
- Location of Cuxac-Cabardès
- Location within France Location within Occitanie
- Coordinates: 43°22′19″N 2°17′02″E
- Country: France
- Region: Occitania
- Department: Aude
- Arrondissement: Carcassonne
- Canton: La Malepère à la Montagne Noire

Government
  - Mayor (2020–2026): Paul Griffe
- Area^{1}: 25.06 km^{2} (9.68 sq mi)
- Elevation: 515 m (1,690 ft)
- Highest elevation: 907 m (2,976 ft)
- Lowest elevation: 338 m (1,109 ft)
- Population (2023): 947
  - Density: 37.8/km^{2} (97.9/sq mi)
- Time zone: UTC+01:00 (CET)
  - Summer (DST): UTC+02:00 (CEST)
- INSEE/Postal code: 11115 /11390
- ^{1} French Land Register data, which excludes lakes, ponds, glaciers > 1 km^{2} (0.386 sq mi or 247 acres) and river estuaries.

Cuxac-Cabardès (French pronunciation: [kyksak kabaʁdɛs]; Occitan: Cucçac de Cabardés) is a commune in the Aude department in southern France.

== Population ==
Historical population
| Year | Pop. | ±% p.a. |
|---|---|---|
| 1968 | 669 | — |
| 1975 | 689 | +0.42% |
| 1982 | 695 | +0.12% |
| 1990 | 724 | +0.51% |
| 1999 | 854 | +1.85% |
| 2007 | 913 | +0.84% |
| 2012 | 901 | −0.26% |
| 2017 | 911 | +0.22% |
| 2023 | 947 | +0.65% |
Source: INSEE

== See also ==
- Communes of the Aude department
