= Brousses-et-Villaret =

Commune in Occitanie, France

- Commune
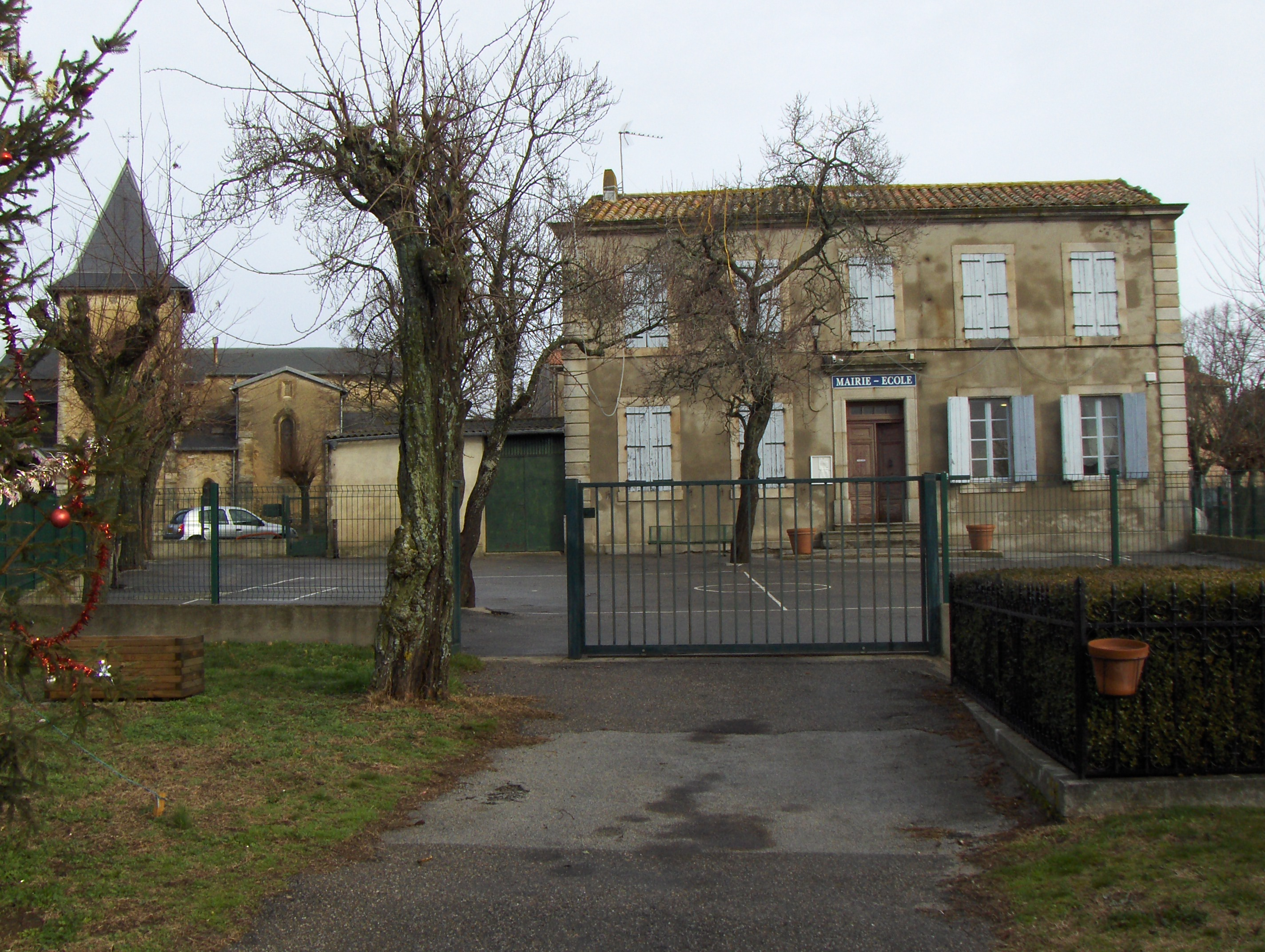
- The town hall in Brousses

- Coat of arms
- Location of Brousses-et-Villaret
- Location within France Location within Occitanie
- Coordinates: 43°20′35″N 2°15′15″E
- Country: France
- Region: Occitania
- Department: Aude
- Arrondissement: Carcassonne
- Canton: La Malepère à la Montagne Noire

Government
  - Mayor (2020–2026): Yannick Alain Dufour-Loriolle
- Area^{1}: 11.16 km^{2} (4.31 sq mi)
- Elevation: 400 m (1,300 ft)
- Highest elevation: 599 m (1,965 ft)
- Lowest elevation: 229 m (751 ft)
- Population (2023): 365
  - Density: 32.7/km^{2} (84.7/sq mi)
- Time zone: UTC+01:00 (CET)
  - Summer (DST): UTC+02:00 (CEST)
- INSEE/Postal code: 11052 /11390
- ^{1} French Land Register data, which excludes lakes, ponds, glaciers > 1 km^{2} (0.386 sq mi or 247 acres) and river estuaries.

Brousses-et-Villaret (French pronunciation: [bʁus e vilaʁɛ]; Occitan: Brossas e Vilaret) is a commune in the Aude department in southern France.

== Population ==
Historical population
Year	Pop.	±% p.a.
1968	207	—
1975	227	+1.33%
1982	222	−0.32%
1990	254	+1.70%
1999	307	+2.13%
2007	314	+0.28%
2012	333	+1.18%
2017	344	+0.65%
2023	365	+0.99%
Source: INSEE

== See also ==
- Communes of the Aude department
