= Moussoulens =

Commune in Occitanie, France

- Commune
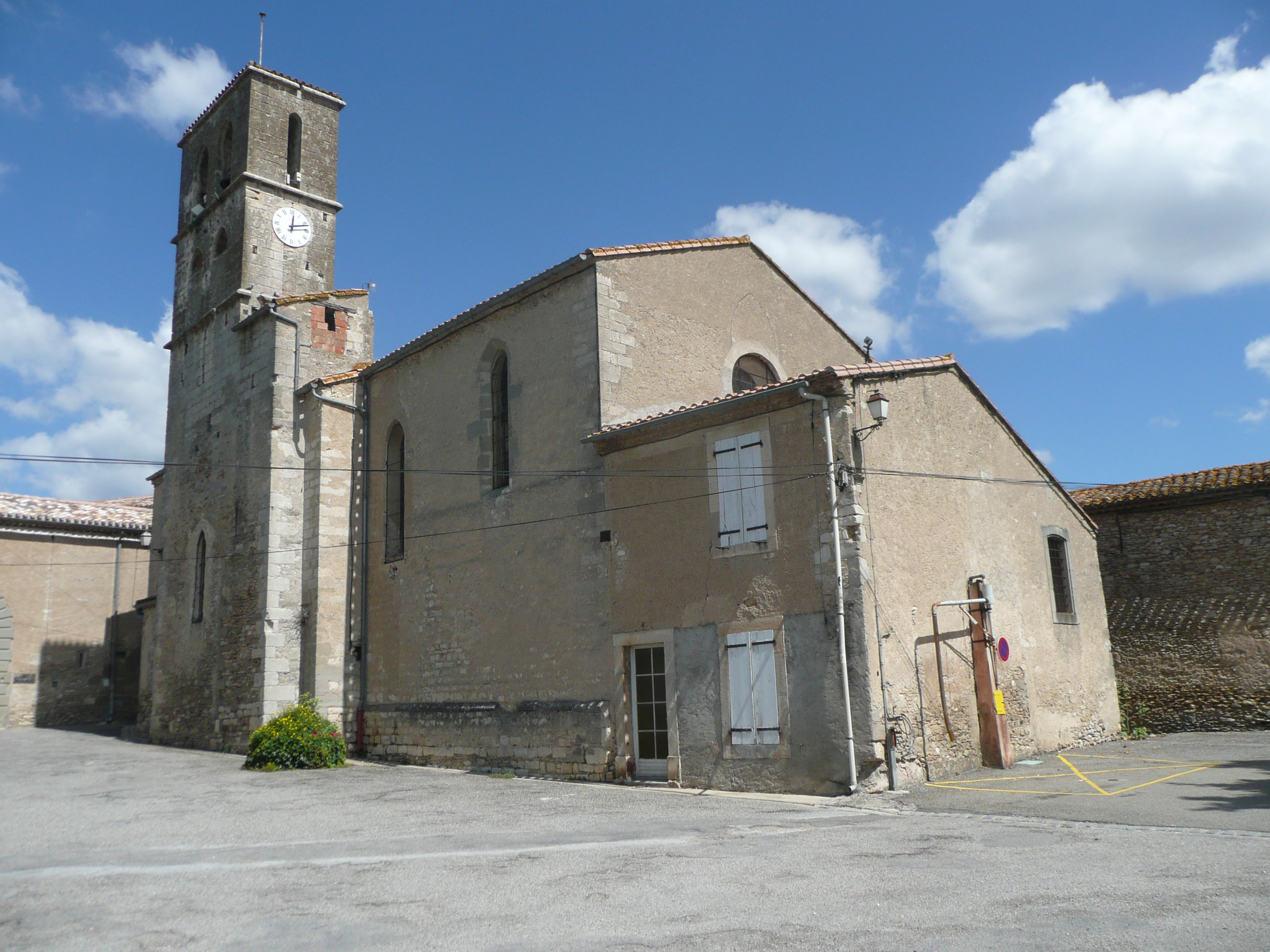
- The church in Moussoulens

- Coat of arms
- Location of Moussoulens
- Location within France Location within Occitanie
- Coordinates: 43°16′49″N 2°13′49″E
- Country: France
- Region: Occitania
- Department: Aude
- Arrondissement: Carcassonne
- Canton: La Malepère à la Montagne Noire
- Intercommunality: Carcassonne Agglo

Government
  - Mayor (2020–2026): Gérard Vallier
- Area^{1}: 19.6 km^{2} (7.6 sq mi)
- Elevation: 170 m (560 ft)
- Highest elevation: 294 m (965 ft)
- Lowest elevation: 108 m (354 ft)
- Population (2023): 956
  - Density: 48.8/km^{2} (126/sq mi)
- Time zone: UTC+01:00 (CET)
  - Summer (DST): UTC+02:00 (CEST)
- INSEE/Postal code: 11259 /11170
- Website: www.moussoulens.fr
- ^{1} French Land Register data, which excludes lakes, ponds, glaciers > 1 km^{2} (0.386 sq mi or 247 acres) and river estuaries.

Moussoulens (French pronunciation: [musulɛ̃s]; Occitan: Mossolens) is a commune in the Aude department in southern France.

== Population ==
Historical population
Year	Pop.	±% p.a.
1968	519	—
1975	498	−0.59%
1982	546	+1.32%
1990	613	+1.46%
1999	710	+1.65%
2007	871	+2.59%
2012	976	+2.30%
2017	1,018	+0.85%
2023	956	−1.04%
Source: INSEE

== See also ==
- Communes of the Aude department
