= Raissac-sur-Lampy =

Commune in Occitanie, France

- Commune
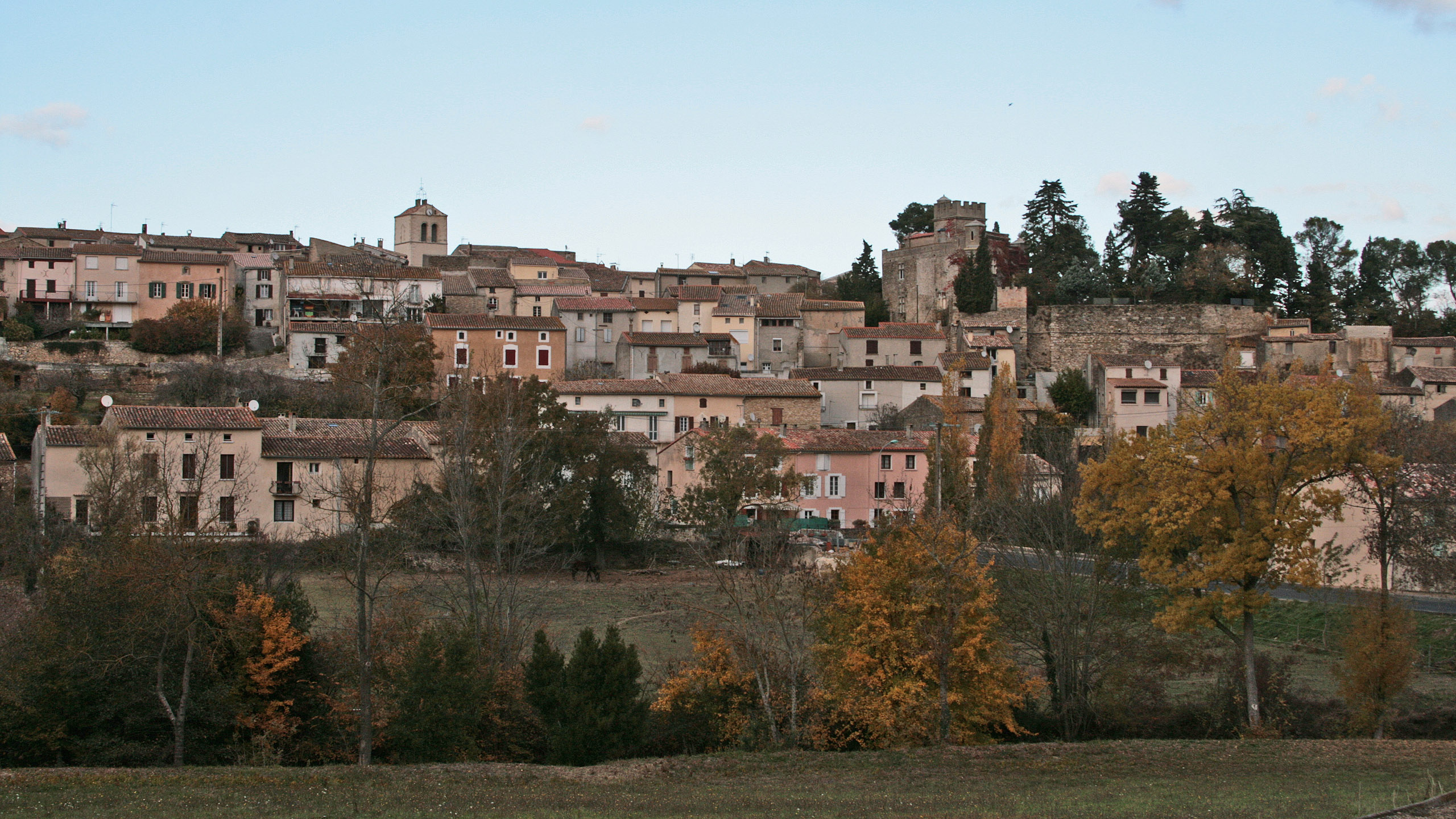
- A general view of Raissac-sur-Lampy

- Coat of arms
- Location of Raissac-sur-Lampy
- Location within France Location within Occitanie
- Coordinates: 43°16′43″N 2°09′36″E
- Country: France
- Region: Occitania
- Department: Aude
- Arrondissement: Carcassonne
- Canton: La Malepère à la Montagne Noire
- Intercommunality: Carcassonne Agglo

Government
  - Mayor (2020–2026): André Bonnet
- Area^{1}: 5.23 km^{2} (2.02 sq mi)
- Elevation: 123 m (404 ft)
- Highest elevation: 231 m (758 ft)
- Lowest elevation: 116 m (381 ft)
- Population (2023): 454
  - Density: 86.8/km^{2} (225/sq mi)
- Time zone: UTC+01:00 (CET)
  - Summer (DST): UTC+02:00 (CEST)
- INSEE/Postal code: 11308 /11170
- ^{1} French Land Register data, which excludes lakes, ponds, glaciers > 1 km^{2} (0.386 sq mi or 247 acres) and river estuaries.

Raissac-sur-Lampy (French pronunciation: [ʁɛsak syʁ lɑ̃pi]; Occitan: Raissac de Lampi) is a commune in the Aude department in southern France.

== Population ==
Historical population
| Year | Pop. | ±% p.a. |
|---|---|---|
| 1968 | 176 | — |
| 1975 | 196 | +1.55% |
| 1982 | 206 | +0.71% |
| 1990 | 190 | −1.01% |
| 1999 | 211 | +1.17% |
| 2007 | 291 | +4.10% |
| 2012 | 418 | +7.51% |
| 2017 | 456 | +1.76% |
| 2023 | 454 | −0.07% |
Source: INSEE

== See also ==
- Communes of the Aude department
