= Labécède-Lauragais =

Commune in Occitanie, France

- Commune
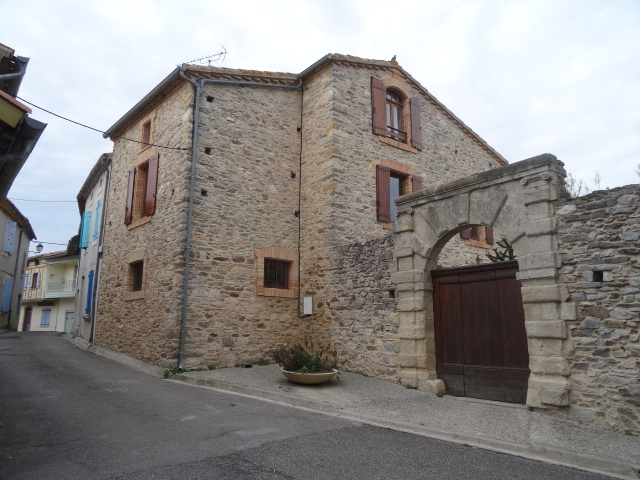
- The chateau entrance in Labécède-Lauragais

- Coat of arms
- Location of Labécède-Lauragais
- Location within France Location within Occitanie
- Coordinates: 43°23′33″N 2°00′22″E
- Country: France
- Region: Occitania
- Department: Aude
- Arrondissement: Carcassonne
- Canton: La Malepère à la Montagne Noire

Government
  - Mayor (2020–2026): Jean-Francois Pouzadoux
- Area^{1}: 19.96 km^{2} (7.71 sq mi)
- Elevation: 320 m (1,050 ft)
- Highest elevation: 593 m (1,946 ft)
- Lowest elevation: 230 m (750 ft)
- Population (2023): 420
  - Density: 21/km^{2} (54/sq mi)
- Time zone: UTC+01:00 (CET)
  - Summer (DST): UTC+02:00 (CEST)
- INSEE/Postal code: 11181 /11400
- ^{1} French Land Register data, which excludes lakes, ponds, glaciers > 1 km^{2} (0.386 sq mi or 247 acres) and river estuaries.

Labécède-Lauragais (French pronunciation: [labesɛd loʁaɡɛ]; Occitan: La Beceda) is a commune in the Aude department in southern France.

== Population ==
Historical population
Year	Pop.	±% p.a.
1968	231	—
1975	234	+0.18%
1982	279	+2.54%
1990	317	+1.61%
1999	331	+0.48%
2007	372	+1.47%
2012	425	+2.70%
2017	412	−0.62%
2023	420	+0.32%
Source: INSEE

== See also ==
- Communes of the Aude department
