= Saint-Denis, Aude =

Commune in Occitanie, France

Saint-Denis
- Commune
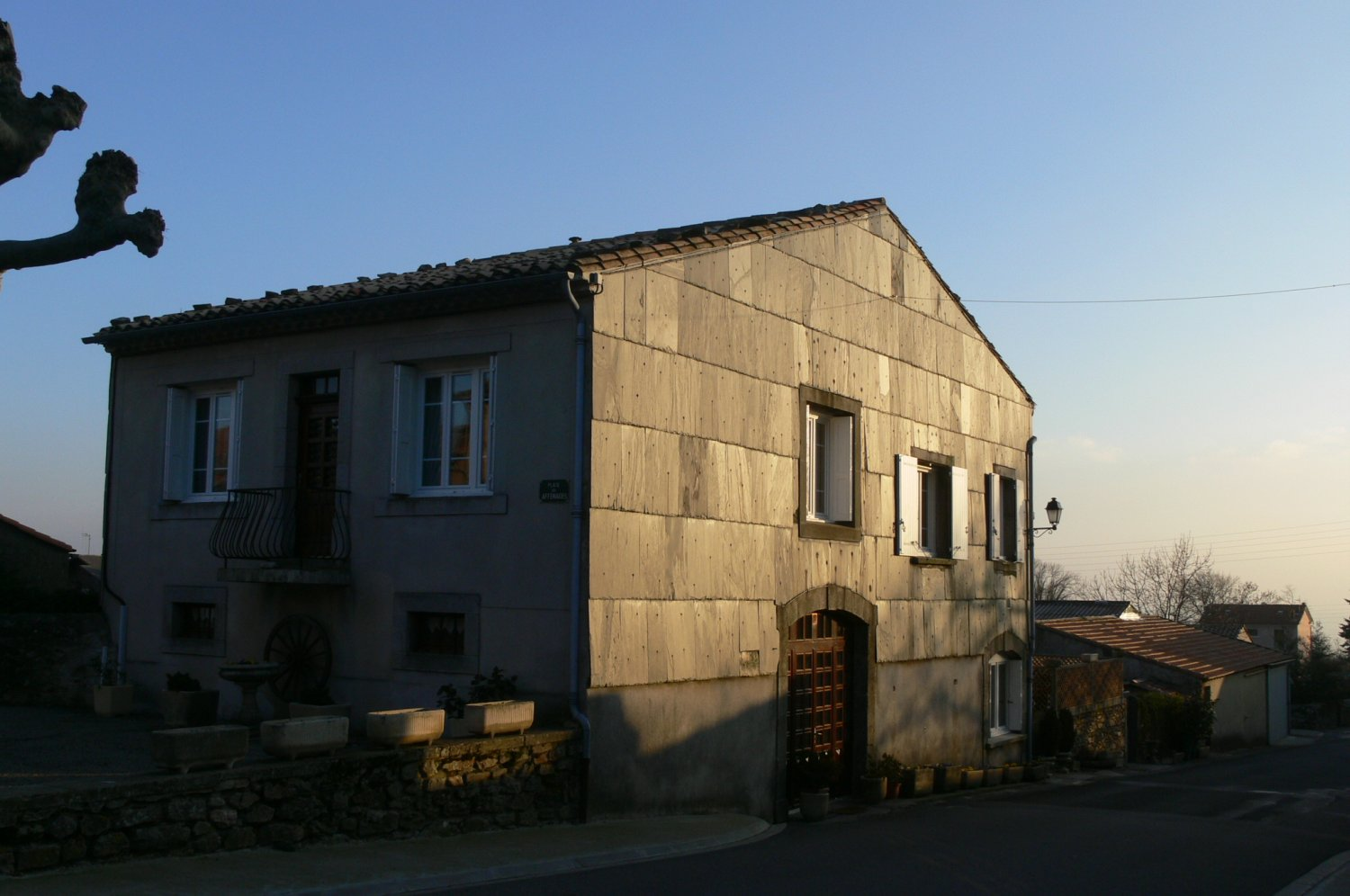
- Slate siding

- Coat of arms
- Location of Saint-Denis
- Location within France Location within Occitanie
- Coordinates: 43°21′39″N 2°13′18″E
- Country: France
- Region: Occitania
- Department: Aude
- Arrondissement: Carcassonne
- Canton: La Malepère à la Montagne Noire

Government
  - Mayor (2020–2026): Michael Laurent
- Area^{1}: 8.21 km^{2} (3.17 sq mi)
- Elevation: 528 m (1,732 ft)
- Highest elevation: 645 m (2,116 ft)
- Lowest elevation: 280 m (920 ft)
- Population (2023): 523
  - Density: 63.7/km^{2} (165/sq mi)
- Time zone: UTC+01:00 (CET)
  - Summer (DST): UTC+02:00 (CEST)
- INSEE/Postal code: 11339 /11310
- ^{1} French Land Register data, which excludes lakes, ponds, glaciers > 1 km^{2} (0.386 sq mi or 247 acres) and river estuaries.

Saint-Denis (French pronunciation: [sɛ̃ dəni]; Languedocien: Sant Danís) is a commune in the Aude department in southern France.

== Population ==
Historical population
Year	Pop.	±% p.a.
1968	292	—
1975	276	−0.80%
1982	277	+0.05%
1990	313	+1.54%
1999	389	+2.44%
2007	456	+2.01%
2012	512	+2.34%
2017	512	+0.00%
2023	523	+0.35%
Source: INSEE

== See also ==
- Communes of the Aude department
