= Sainte-Eulalie, Aude =

Commune in Occitanie, France

Sainte-Eulalie
- Commune
- Coat of arms
- Location of Sainte-Eulalie
- Location within France Location within Occitanie
- Coordinates: 43°14′52″N 2°12′41″E
- Country: France
- Region: Occitania
- Department: Aude
- Arrondissement: Carcassonne
- Canton: La Malepère à la Montagne Noire
- Intercommunality: Carcassonne Agglo

Government
  - Mayor (2020–2026): Jean-Paul Pouzens
- Area^{1}: 6.5 km^{2} (2.5 sq mi)
- Elevation: 119 m (390 ft)
- Highest elevation: 134 m (440 ft)
- Lowest elevation: 109 m (358 ft)
- Population (2023): 595
  - Density: 92/km^{2} (240/sq mi)
- Time zone: UTC+01:00 (CET)
  - Summer (DST): UTC+02:00 (CEST)
- INSEE/Postal code: 11340 /11170
- ^{1} French Land Register data, which excludes lakes, ponds, glaciers > 1 km^{2} (0.386 sq mi or 247 acres) and river estuaries.

Sainte-Eulalie (French pronunciation: [sɛ̃t ølali]; Languedocien: Santa Aulària) is a commune in the Aude department in southern France.

== Population ==
Historical population
Year	Pop.	±% p.a.
1968	352	—
1975	258	−4.34%
1982	300	+2.18%
1990	342	+1.65%
1999	406	+1.92%
2007	505	+2.77%
2012	523	+0.70%
2017	506	−0.66%
2023	595	+2.74%
Source: INSEE

== See also ==
- Communes of the Aude department
