= Saint-Martin-le-Vieil =

Commune in Occitanie, France

- Commune
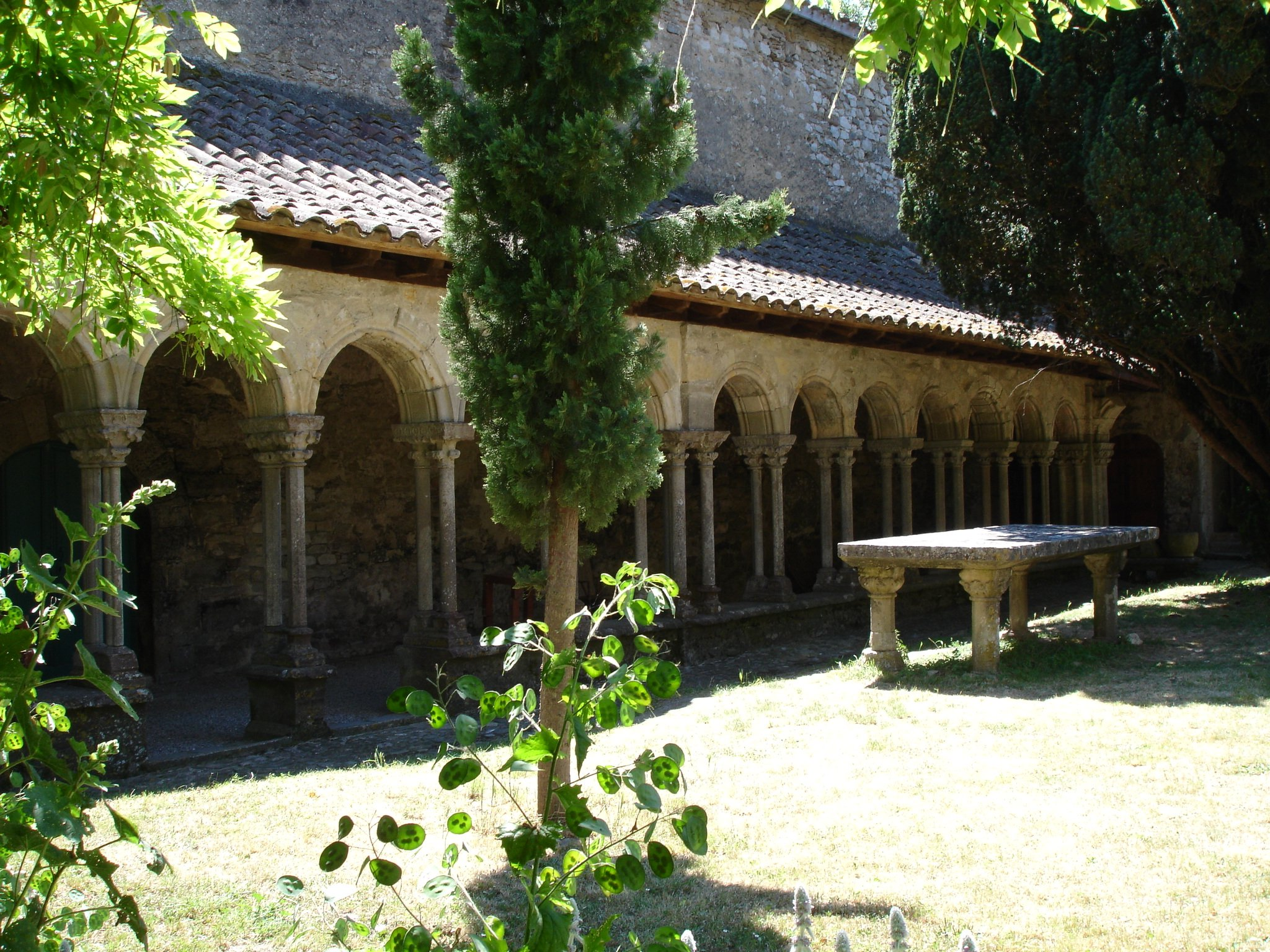
- The cloister of the Villelongue Abbey in Saint-Martin-le-Vieil

- Coat of arms
- Location of Saint-Martin-le-Vieil
- Location within France Location within Occitanie
- Coordinates: 43°17′44″N 2°08′43″E
- Country: France
- Region: Occitania
- Department: Aude
- Arrondissement: Carcassonne
- Canton: La Malepère à la Montagne Noire
- Intercommunality: Carcassonne Agglo

Government
  - Mayor (2020–2026): Christian Vié
- Area^{1}: 13.25 km^{2} (5.12 sq mi)
- Elevation: 125 m (410 ft)
- Highest elevation: 306 m (1,004 ft)
- Lowest elevation: 130 m (430 ft)
- Population (2023): 211
  - Density: 15.9/km^{2} (41.2/sq mi)
- Time zone: UTC+01:00 (CET)
  - Summer (DST): UTC+02:00 (CEST)
- INSEE/Postal code: 11357 /11170
- ^{1} French Land Register data, which excludes lakes, ponds, glaciers > 1 km^{2} (0.386 sq mi or 247 acres) and river estuaries.

Saint-Martin-le-Vieil (Languedocien: Sant Martin le Vièlh) is a commune in the Aude department in southern France.

== Population ==
Historical population
Year	Pop.	±% p.a.
1968	171	—
1975	182	+0.89%
1982	185	+0.23%
1990	168	−1.20%
1999	191	+1.44%
2007	214	+1.43%
2012	238	+2.15%
2017	226	−1.03%
2023	211	−1.14%
Source: INSEE

== See also ==
- Communes of the Aude department
