= Carlipa =

Commune in Occitanie, France

- Commune
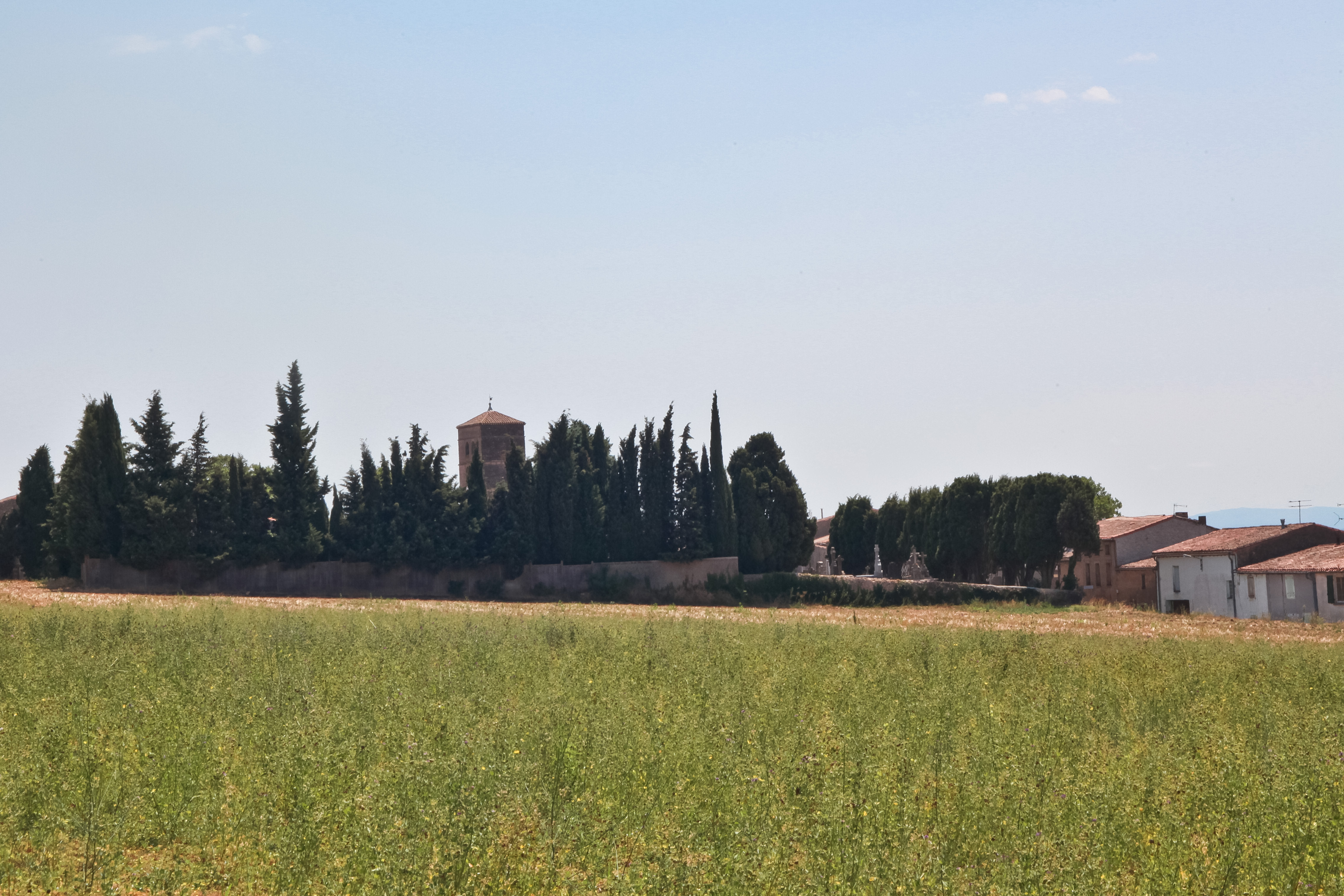
- A general view of Carlipa

- Coat of arms
- Location of Carlipa
- Location within France Location within Occitanie
- Coordinates: 43°18′28″N 2°07′37″E
- Country: France
- Region: Occitania
- Department: Aude
- Arrondissement: Carcassonne
- Canton: La Malepère à la Montagne Noire

Government
  - Mayor (2020–2026): Serge Serrano
- Area^{1}: 5.26 km^{2} (2.03 sq mi)
- Elevation: 214 m (702 ft)
- Highest elevation: 238 m (781 ft)
- Lowest elevation: 141 m (463 ft)
- Population (2023): 332
  - Density: 63.1/km^{2} (163/sq mi)
- Time zone: UTC+01:00 (CET)
  - Summer (DST): UTC+02:00 (CEST)
- INSEE/Postal code: 11070 /11170
- ^{1} French Land Register data, which excludes lakes, ponds, glaciers > 1 km^{2} (0.386 sq mi or 247 acres) and river estuaries.

Carlipa (French pronunciation: [kaʁlipa]) is a commune in the Aude department in southern France.

== Population ==
Historical population
Year	Pop.	±% p.a.
1968	302	—
1975	251	−2.61%
1982	208	−2.65%
1990	216	+0.47%
1999	250	+1.64%
2007	303	+2.43%
2012	319	+1.03%
2017	340	+1.28%
2023	332	−0.40%
Source: INSEE

== See also ==
- Communes of the Aude department
