= Villesèquelande =

Commune in Occitanie, France

- Commune
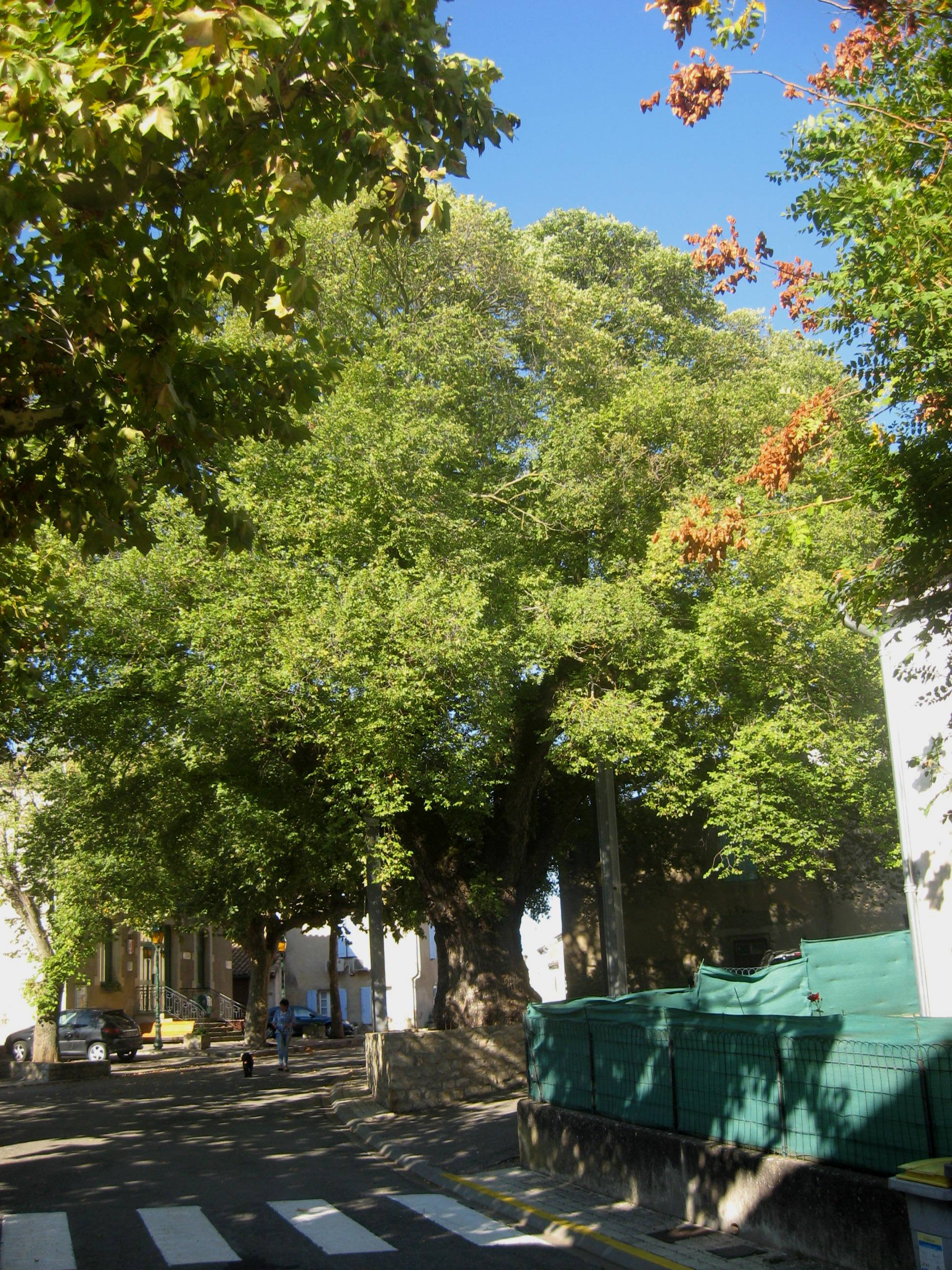
- The Ormeau Sully in Villesèquelande

- Coat of arms
- Location of Villesèquelande
- Location within France Location within Occitanie
- Coordinates: 43°14′18″N 2°13′56″E
- Country: France
- Region: Occitania
- Department: Aude
- Arrondissement: Carcassonne
- Canton: La Malepère à la Montagne Noire
- Intercommunality: Carcassonne Agglo

Government
  - Mayor (2020–2026): Aurélien Turchetto
- Area^{1}: 5.35 km^{2} (2.07 sq mi)
- Elevation: 119 m (390 ft)
- Highest elevation: 160 m (520 ft)
- Lowest elevation: 104 m (341 ft)
- Population (2023): 882
  - Density: 165/km^{2} (427/sq mi)
- Time zone: UTC+01:00 (CET)
  - Summer (DST): UTC+02:00 (CEST)
- INSEE/Postal code: 11437 /11170
- ^{1} French Land Register data, which excludes lakes, ponds, glaciers > 1 km^{2} (0.386 sq mi or 247 acres) and river estuaries.

Villesèquelande (French pronunciation: [vilsɛklɑ̃d]; Occitan: Vilaseca-Landa) is a commune near Carcassonne in the Aude department in southern France. It is noted for the ancient field elm, the Ormeau Sully, allegedly planted by Maximilien de Béthune, Duke of Sully in the early 17th century in front of the church in the village centre.

== Population ==
Historical population
| Year | Pop. | ±% p.a. |
|---|---|---|
| 1968 | 342 | — |
| 1975 | 455 | +4.16% |
| 1982 | 521 | +1.95% |
| 1990 | 506 | −0.36% |
| 1999 | 571 | +1.35% |
| 2007 | 800 | +4.31% |
| 2012 | 850 | +1.22% |
| 2017 | 896 | +1.06% |
| 2023 | 882 | −0.26% |
Source: INSEE

== See also ==
- Communes of the Aude department
