= Montréal, Aude =

Commune in Occitanie, France

Montréal
- Commune
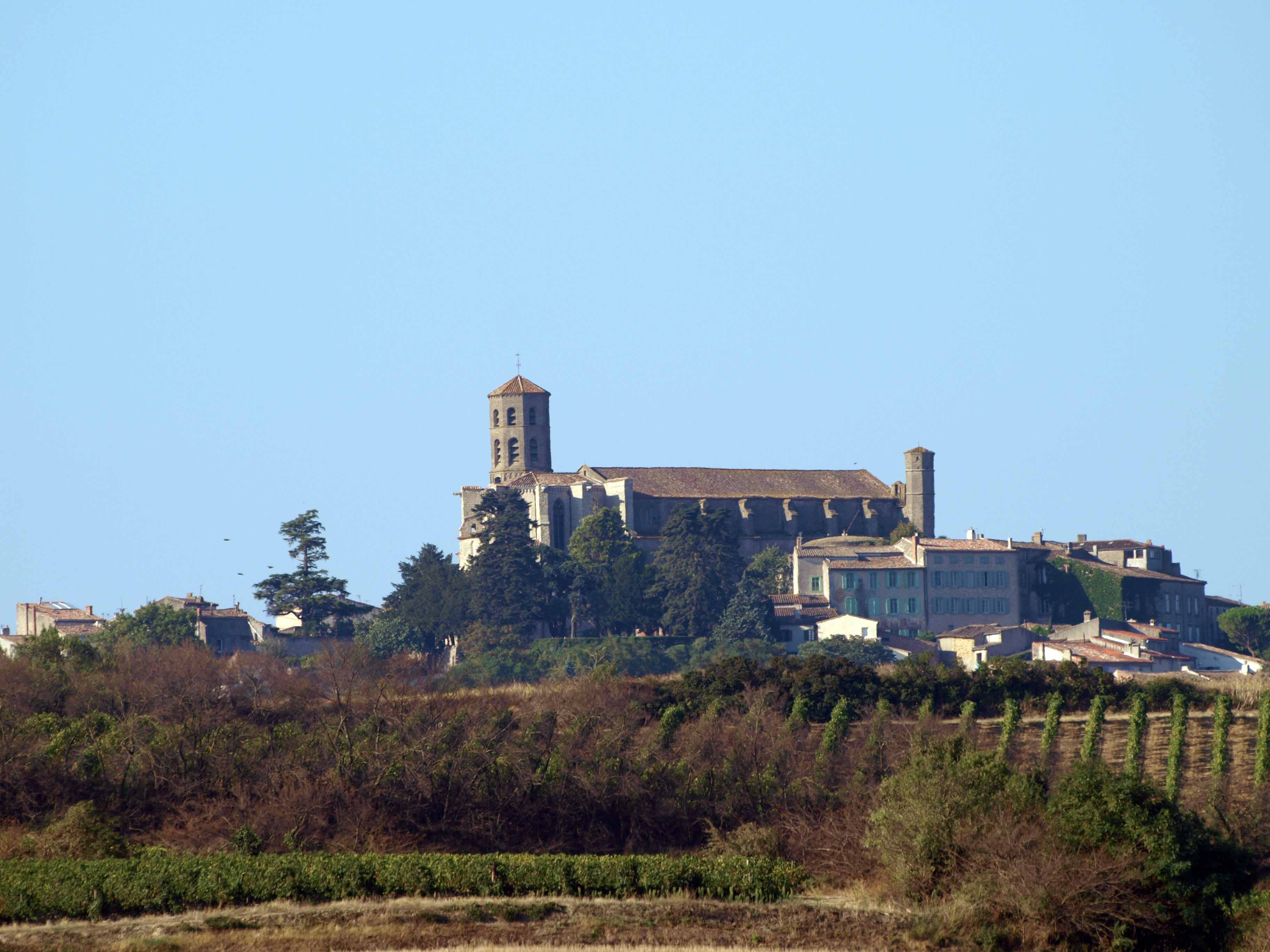
- Church of St Vincent, given collegiate status in the 14th century

- Coat of arms
- Location of Montréal
- Location within France Location within Occitanie
- Coordinates: 43°12′N 2°09′E
- Country: France
- Region: Occitania
- Department: Aude
- Arrondissement: Carcassonne
- Canton: La Malepère à la Montagne Noire

Government
  - Mayor (2020–2026): Bernard Breil
- Area^{1}: 55.21 km^{2} (21.32 sq mi)
- Highest elevation: 443 m (1,453 ft)
- Lowest elevation: 117 m (384 ft)
- Population (2023): 2,136
  - Density: 38.69/km^{2} (100.2/sq mi)
- Time zone: UTC+01:00 (CET)
  - Summer (DST): UTC+02:00 (CEST)
- INSEE/Postal code: 11254 /11290
- ^{1} French Land Register data, which excludes lakes, ponds, glaciers > 1 km^{2} (0.386 sq mi or 247 acres) and river estuaries.

Montréal (French pronunciation: [mɔ̃ʁe.al]; Languedocien: Montreal) is a commune just west of Carcassonne in the Aude department, a part of the ancient Languedoc province and the present-day Occitanie region in southern France.

== History ==
In 1206, Montréal was the site of debates between Catholics and Cathars, a sect of Christianity whose beliefs ran contrary to the teachings of the Catholic Church. These debates were initiated by a Spanish bishop Diego of Osma and his canon, the future Saint Dominic, as part of Pope Innocent III's program to convert the Cathars in the area to Catholicism.

== Population ==
Historical population
Year	Pop.	±% p.a.
1968	1,678	—
1975	1,588	−0.78%
1982	1,595	+0.06%
1990	1,546	−0.39%
1999	1,672	+0.87%
2007	1,933	+1.83%
2012	1,927	−0.06%
2017	1,896	−0.32%
2023	2,136	+2.01%
Source: INSEE

== See also ==
- Communes of the Aude department
