= 2024 French legislative election in Haute-Garonne =

Following the first round of the 2024 French legislative election on 30 June 2024, runoff elections in each constituency where no candidate received a vote share greater than 50 percent were scheduled for 7 July. Candidates permitted to stand in the runoff elections needed to either come in first or second place in the first round or achieve more than 12.5 percent of the votes of the entire electorate (as opposed to 12.5 percent of the vote share due to low turnout).

== Haute-Garonne ==
=== 1st constituency ===
Candidate	Party or alliance		First round		Second round	
Candidate	Party or alliance		Votes	%	Votes	%
Hadrien Clouet	New Popular Front	La France Insoumise	26,985	45.52	29,059	49.97
Elodie Hobet	Ensemble	Renaissance	16,063	27.10	15,842	27.24
Lola Chambelin	National Rally		12,636	21.32	13,253	22.79
Evelyne Boujat	Miscellaneous centre	Regionalists	1,601	2.70		
Jean-Marie Trouillet	Reconquête		1,028	1.73		
Alexis de Berranger	Independent		574	0.97		
Olivier Le Penven	Far-left	Lutte Ouvrière	390	0.66		
Total			59,277	100.00	58,154	100.00
Valid votes			59,277	97.22	58,154	97.37
Invalid votes			521	0.85	441	0.74
Blank votes			1,173	1.92	1,131	1.89
Total votes			60,971	100.00	59,726	100.00
Registered voters/turnout			85,231	71.54	85,235	70.07

=== 2nd constituency ===
Candidate	Party or alliance		First round		Second round	
Candidate	Party or alliance		Votes	%	Votes	%
Anne Stambach-Terrenoir	New Popular Front	La France Insoumise	30,402	40.53	33,063	44.41
Jean-Luc Lagleize	Ensemble	Democratic Movement	20,934	27.91	20,819	27.96
Frank Khalifa	National Rally		19,815	26.41	20,575	27.63
Pauline Lorans	Reconquête		1,366	1.82		
Maxime Mayoral	Ecologists	Independent	1,306	1.74		
Arthur Nestier	Ecologists	Independent	606	0.81		
Clotilde Barthélémy	Far-left	Lutte Ouvrière	588	0.78		
Total			75,017	100.00	74,457	100.00
Valid votes			75,017	97.17	74,457	97.43
Invalid votes			644	0.83	524	0.69
Blank votes			1,540	1.99	1,440	1.88
Total votes			77,201	100.00	76,421	100.00
Registered voters/turnout			106,597	72.42	106,618	71.68

=== 3rd constituency ===
Candidate	Party or alliance		First round		Second round	
Candidate	Party or alliance		Votes	%	Votes	%
Agathe Roby	New Popular Front	La France Insoumise	21,064	34.58	22,986	38.31
Corinne Vignon	Ensemble	Renaissance	20,227	33.20	23,650	39.42
Stéphanie Alarcon	National Rally		13,022	21.38	13,366	22.28
Clément Delmas	The Republicans		3,307	5.43		
Baptiste Robert	Miscellaneous left	Independent	828	1.36		
Marie-Pierre Bouchet	Miscellaneous centre	Regionalists	731	1.20		
Philippe Soleri	Reconquête		683	1.12		
Domitille Allorant	Ecologists	Independent	613	1.01		
Malena Adrada	Far-left	Lutte Ouvrière	254	0.42		
Philippe Maury	Miscellaneous right	Résistons!	162	0.27		
Noël Nemouthe	Regionalists	Independent	29	0.05		
Total			60,920	100.00	60,002	100.00
Valid votes			60,920	98.16	60,002	97.76
Invalid votes			328	0.53	358	0.58
Blank votes			815	1.31	1,016	1.66
Total votes			62,063	100.00	61,376	100.00
Registered voters/turnout			81,919	75.76	81,918	74.92

=== 4th constituency ===
Candidate	Party or alliance		Votes	%
François Piquemal	New Popular Front	La France Insoumise	25,681	53.39
Margaux Pech	Ensemble	Renaissance	12,950	26.92
Audrey Larregle	National Rally		7,531	15.66
Jacme Delmas	Miscellaneous centre	Regionalists	945	1.96
Arthur Cottrel	Reconquête		734	1.53
Patrick Marcireau	Far-left	Lutte Ouvrière	262	0.54
Paul Cazals	Far-left	New Anticapitalist Party (Note: Dissident that ran without the backing of the New Popular Front)	0	0.00
Total			48,103	100.00
Valid votes			48,103	97.87
Invalid votes			397	0.81
Blank votes			650	1.32
Total votes			49,150	100.00
Registered voters/turnout			69,960	70.25

=== 5th constituency ===
Candidate	Party or alliance		First round		Second round	
Candidate	Party or alliance		Votes	%	Votes	%
Julien Leonardelli	National Rally		29,897	39.52	32,338	43.78
Jean-François Portarrieu	Ensemble	Horizons	22,267	29.43	41,533	56.22
Sylvie Espagnolle	New Popular Front	La France Insoumise	20,925	27.66		
Dominique Piussan	Reconquête		1,443	1.91		
Michel Laserge	Far-left	Lutte Ouvrière	1,000	1.32		
Sylvie Bonnemaison	Regionalists	Résistons	121	0.16		
Total			75,653	100.00	73,871	100.00
Valid votes			75,653	96.67	73,871	94.77
Invalid votes			672	0.86	1,105	1.42
Blank votes			1,933	2.47	2,973	3.81
Total votes			78,258	100.00	77,949	100.00
Registered voters/turnout			108,786	71.94	108,819	71.63

=== 6th constituency ===
Candidate	Party or alliance		First round		Second round	
Candidate	Party or alliance		Votes	%	Votes	%
Arnaud Simion	New Popular Front	Socialist Party	29,031	34.03	47,670	60.40
Nadine Demange-Fierlej	National Rally		26,379	30.92	31,256	39.60
Monique Iborra	Ensemble	Renaissance	25,256	29.60		
Sandra Laporte	Ecologists	Independent	2,773	3.25		
Annaël Gérard	Reconquête		1,104	1.29		
Michèle Puel	Far-left	Lutte Ouvrière	774	0.91		
Total			85,317	100.00	78,926	100.00
Valid votes			85,317	97.34	78,926	91.07
Invalid votes			714	0.81	1,834	2.12
Blank votes			1,621	1.85	5,902	6.81
Total votes			87,652	100.00	86,662	100.00
Registered voters/turnout			117,374	74.68	117,395	73.82

=== 7th constituency ===
Candidate	Party or alliance		First round		Second round	
Candidate	Party or alliance		Votes	%	Votes	%
Gaëtan Inard	Union of the far right	The Republicans	30,042	40.37	34,145	49.22
Christophe Bex	New Popular Front	La France Insoumise	24,681	33.17	35,228	50.78
Elisabeth Toutut-Picard	Ensemble	Renaissance	18,462	24.81		
Hervé Bergnes	Far-left	Lutte Ouvrière	1,223	1.64		
Total			74,408	100.00	69,373	100.00
Valid votes			74,408	96.49	69,373	90.52
Invalid votes			795	1.03	1,766	2.30
Blank votes			1,914	2.48	5,496	7.17
Total votes			77,117	100.00	76,635	100.00
Registered voters/turnout			108,229	71.25	108,225	70.81

=== 8th constituency ===
Candidate	Party or alliance		First round		Second round	
Candidate	Party or alliance		Votes	%	Votes	%
Loïc Delchard	National Rally		23,893	40.54	27,665	48.13
Joël Aviragnet	New Popular Front	Socialist Party	21,751	36.90	29,813	51.87
Céline Laurenties-Barrère	Ensemble	Horizons	9,227	15.65		
Wilfried Serre	Miscellaneous right	Résistons !	1,805	3.06		
Lucie Viola	Sovereigntist right	Independent	746	1.27		
Alain Peres	Reconquête		728	1.24		
Martine Guiraud	Far-left	Lutte Ouvrière	536	0.91		
Dominique Darrozès	Miscellaneous centre	Regionalists	257	0.44		
Total			58,943	100.00	57,478	100.00
Valid votes			58,943	96.67	57,478	93.29
Invalid votes			709	1.16	1,428	2.32
Blank votes			1,322	2.17	2,706	4.39
Total votes			60,974	100.00	61,612	100.00
Registered voters/turnout			86,096	70.82	86,059	71.59

=== 9th constituency ===
Candidate	Party or alliance		First round		Second round	
Candidate	Party or alliance		Votes	%	Votes	%
Christine Arrighi	New Popular Front	The Ecologists	26,472	47.53	30,177	54.50
Caroline Beout	National Rally		13,865	24.89	14,775	26.68
Florian Delrieu	Ensemble	Renaissance	12,451	22.36	10,417	18.81
Camille Clinet	Miscellaneous centre	Independent	1,202	2.16		
Christelle Filippi	Reconquête		813	1.46		
Henri Martin	Far-left	Lutte Ouvrière	569	1.02		
Nathanaëlle Loubet-Sruh	Far-left	New Anticapitalist Party	322	0.58		
Total			55,694	100.00	55,369	100.00
Valid votes			55,694	97.39	55,369	97.60
Invalid votes			469	0.82	382	0.67
Blank votes			1,026	1.79	979	1.73
Total votes			57,189	100.00	56,730	100.00
Registered voters/turnout			81,368	70.28	81,378	69.71

=== 10th constituency ===
Candidate	Party or alliance		First round		Second round	
Candidate	Party or alliance		Votes	%	Votes	%
Jacques Oberti	New Popular Front	Socialist Party	28,631	36.24	44,932	61.07
Caroline Falgas-Colomina	National Rally		23,993	30.37	28,646	38.93
Dominique Faure	Ensemble	Radical Party	22,910	28.99		
Romain Gresle	Reconquête		1,123	1.42		
Frédérique Soulier	Miscellaneous centre	Independent	728	0.92		
Adrien Bourgeade	Ecologists		558	0.71		
Lucile Souche	Far-left	Lutte Ouvrière	523	0.66		
Gilles Corso	Independent		389	0.49		
Arlette Bouzon	Independent		158	0.20		
François Ubeda	The Republicans		1	0.00		
Total			79,014	100.00	73,578	100.00
Valid votes			79,014	96.90	73,578	91.20
Invalid votes			629	0.77	1,516	1.88
Blank votes			1,898	2.33	5,586	6.92
Total votes			81,541	100.00	80,680	100.00
Registered voters/turnout			105,152	77.55	105,169	76.71
