= Gérard Bapt =

French politician

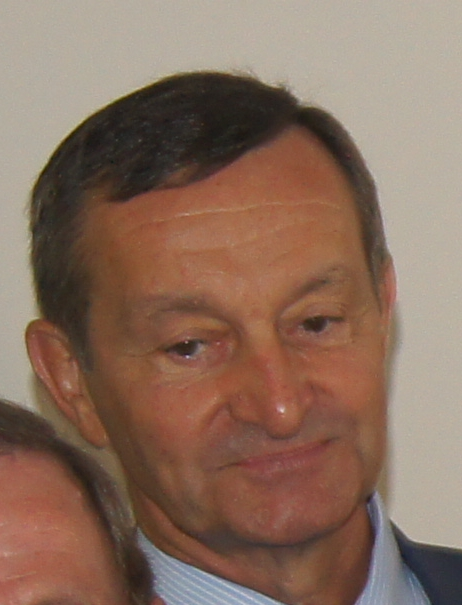

Member of the National Assembly for Haute-Garonne's 2nd constituency
- In office 1997–2017
- Preceded by: Robert Huguenard
- Succeeded by: Jean-Luc Lagleize

Personal details
- Born: 4 February 1946 (age 80) Saint-Étienne, France
- Party: Socialist Party

Gérard Bapt (born 4 February 1946 in Saint-Étienne) is a French politician. He was the deputy for Haute-Garonne's 2nd constituency in the National Assembly of France. He was a member of the Socialist Party (Parti Socialiste) and worked in association with the SRC parliamentary group.

Bapt is a medical doctor and heart specialist. He was first elected in 1978 (to the first constituency) and kept his seat until 1993; he was then re-elected in 1997 and held his seat until 2017.

In 2014 Bapt refused an amendment requiring employers to subsidize cycle commuting to work arguing that this would negatively impact the national social security budget; however, according to cycling activist Nicolas Mercat of the Cabinet Inddigo thinktank, French cyclists cover some 4.4 billion kilometers each year, an activity that reduces social security health care costs by 5.6 billion euros annually.
