= Françoise Imbert =

French politician

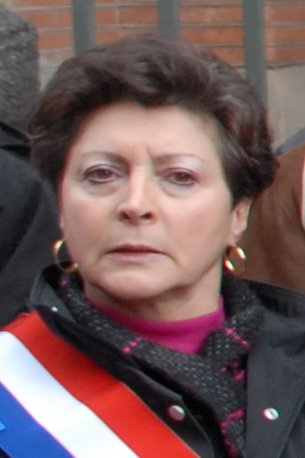
Françoise Imbert

Françoise Imbert (September 16, 1947 – June 30, 2026) was a French politician. She was the member of the National Assembly of France, from 1997 to 2017 for Haute-Garonne's 5th constituency, as a member of the Socialiste, radical, citoyen et divers gauche.

== Life ==
Imbert was born in 1947 in Verdun-sur-Garonne (department Tarn-et-Garonne).

Imbert served as the Member of Parliament for Haute-Garonne’s 5th constituency from 1997 to 2017. From 2004 to 2015 she was chief of staff to Alex Raymond in Colomiers and served as a regional councillor for Midi-Pyrénées. She was active in the Delegation for Women's Rights and Equal Opportunities and the National Council for Policies to Combat Social Exclusion, advocating for social justice and gender equality. Her husband Michel Pouvillon, who died in 2023, had been mayor of Cabanac-Séguenville.

She died on June 30, 2026 (aged 78) in Toulouse (department Haute-Garonne). Throughout her career, she was respected for her moderate, service-oriented approach and dedication to public service, leaving a lasting impact on the northern Toulouse area.
