= Haute-Garonne's 10th constituency =

Constituency of the National Assembly of France

10th constituency of Haute-Garonne
- inline Constituency of the National Assembly of France

- Location of constituency in Department

- Location of Haute-Garonne in France
- Deputy: Jacques Oberti; PS
- Department: Haute-Garonne

The 10th constituency of Haute-Garonne is a French legislative constituency in the Haute-Garonne département.

== Geography ==
It was created in 2010, with the first election in 2012. It consists of

- Canton of Castanet-Tolosan
- Canton of Revel

and the communes

- Villefranche-de-Lauragais
- Caraman
- Lanta
- Montgiscard
- Nailloux

== Deputies ==
Election	Member	Party	Notes
2012	Kader Arif	PS	Appointed to the government on 21 June 2012, he was replaced in the Assembly by his substitute Émilienne Poumirol from 22 July 2012. He resumed his seat on 22 December 2014 after leaving his post in the government.
2017	Sébastien Nadot	LREM	
2018	Sébastien Nadot	SE	Excluded from LREM on 20 December 2018
2020	Sébastien Nadot	EDS	
2021	Sébastien Nadot	LT	
2022	Dominique Faure	PRV	
2022	Laurent Esquenet-Goxes	PRV	
2024	Jacques Oberti	PS	

== Election results ==
=== 2024 ===
Candidate	Party	Alliance	First round			Second round		
Candidate	Party	Alliance	Votes	%	+/–	Votes	%	+/–
Jacques Oberti	PS	NFP	28,631	36.24	+3.08	44,932	61.07	+11.27
Caroline Falgas-Colomina	RN		23,993	30.37	+15.18	28,646	38.93	new
Dominique Faure	REN	Ensemble	22,910	28.99	-1.09	withdrew		
Romain Gresle	REC		1,123	1.42	-2.46			
Frédérique Soulier	DIV		728	0.92	new			
Adrien Bourgeade	ECO		558	0.72	new			
Lucile Souche	LO		523	0.66	-0.13			
Gilles Corso	DIV		389	0.49	+0.18			
Arlette Bouzon	DIV		158	0.20	new			
François Ubeda	LR		1	0.00	-5.24			
Votes			79,014	100.00		73,578	100.00	
Valid votes			79,014	96.90	-0.79	73,578	91.20	-0.93
Blank votes			1,891	2.32	+0.60	5,586	6.92	+1.48
Null votes			636	0.78	+0.19	1,516	1.88	-0.55
Turnout			81,541	77.55	+19.24	80,680	76.71	+20.01
Abstentions			23,611	22.45	-19.24	24,489	23.29	-20.01
Registered voters			105,152			105,169		
Result			PS GAIN FROM PRV					

=== 2022 ===
Legislative Election 2022: Haute-Garonne's 10th constituency
Party	Candidate	Votes	%	±%
G.s (NUPÉS)	Alice Assier	19,535	33.16	+5.17
PRV (Ensemble)	Dominique Faure	17,720	30.08	-9.23
RN	Christelle Poirier	8,947	15.19	+6.45
LR (UDC)	Stéphanie Respaud	3,088	5.24	−12.72
DVD	Baptiste Marquie	2,919	4.95	N/A
REC	Ghislaine Bourland	2,289	3.88	N/A
DVE	Séverine Gimeno	1,667	2.83	N/A
DVC	Réda Zitouni	1,268	2.15	N/A
Others	N/A	1,486		
Turnout		60,315	58.32	−1.34
2nd round result
PRV (Ensemble)	Dominique Faure	27,118	50.20	-10.50
G.s (NUPÉS)	Alice Assier	26,907	49.80	+10.50
Turnout		54,025	56.70	+4.48
PRV gain from LREM				

=== 2017 ===
Candidate	Label	First round		Second round	
Candidate	Label	Votes	%	Votes	%
Sébastien Nadot	REM	21,886	39.31	27,048	60.70
Monique Fabre	FI	7,735	13.89	17,512	39.30
Arnaud Lafon	LR	6,043	10.85		
Mathieu Lachuries	FN	4,866	8.74		
Kader Arif	PS	4,355	7.82		
Dominique Faure	UDI	3,959	7.11		
Henri Arevalo	ECO	2,600	4.67		
Michel Koehl	DIV	1,031	1.85		
Christian Picquet	PCF	896	1.61		
Jean-Pierre Hardy	ECO	887	1.59		
Stevie Chopin	EXD	536	0.96		
Tarsicius Chiso	DVD	310	0.56		
Sara Iribarren	DIV	289	0.52		
Lucile El Hedri	EXG	247	0.44		
Margot Simsi	ECO	35	0.06		
Jean-Pierre Mayer	DLF	1	0.00		
Votes		55,676	100.00	44,560	100.00
Valid votes		55,676	97.86	44,560	89.49
Blank votes		898	1.58	3,621	7.27
Null votes		321	0.56	1,613	3.24
Turnout		56,895	59.66	49,794	52.22
Abstentions		38,474	40.34	45,564	47.78
Registered voters		95,369		95,358	
Source: Ministry of the Interior

=== 2012 ===
2012 legislative election in Haute-Garonne's 10th constituency
Candidate	Party	First round		Second round	
Candidate	Party	Votes	%	Votes	%
Kader Arif	PS	18,084	30.84%	30,903	57.78%
Dominique Faure	PR	14,314	24.41%	22,580	42.22%
Gilbert Hebrard	PS dissident	9,395	16.02%		
Marie Lopau	FN	6,057	10.33%		
Christian Picquet	FG	3,660	6.24%		
Didier Rod	EELV	3,022	5.15%		
Jean-Pierre Albouy	MoDem	1,517	2.59%		
Daniel Ruffat	DVG	1,167	1.99%		
Laurent Fontaneau	AEI	552	0.94%		
Laurent Cunin		363	0.62%		
Raymond Coustures	NPA	255	0.43%		
Antoine Missier	LO	142	0.24%		
Jacques Dumeunier	POI	111	0.19%		
Valid votes		58,639	98.60%	53,481	94.52%
Spoilt and null votes		831	1.40%	3,103	5.48%
Votes cast / turnout		59,470	67.23%	56,584	63.98%
Abstentions		28,989	32.77%	31,859	36.02%
Registered voters		88,459	100.00%	88,443	100.00%
