= Sébastien Nadot =

French historian, writer and politician (born 1972)

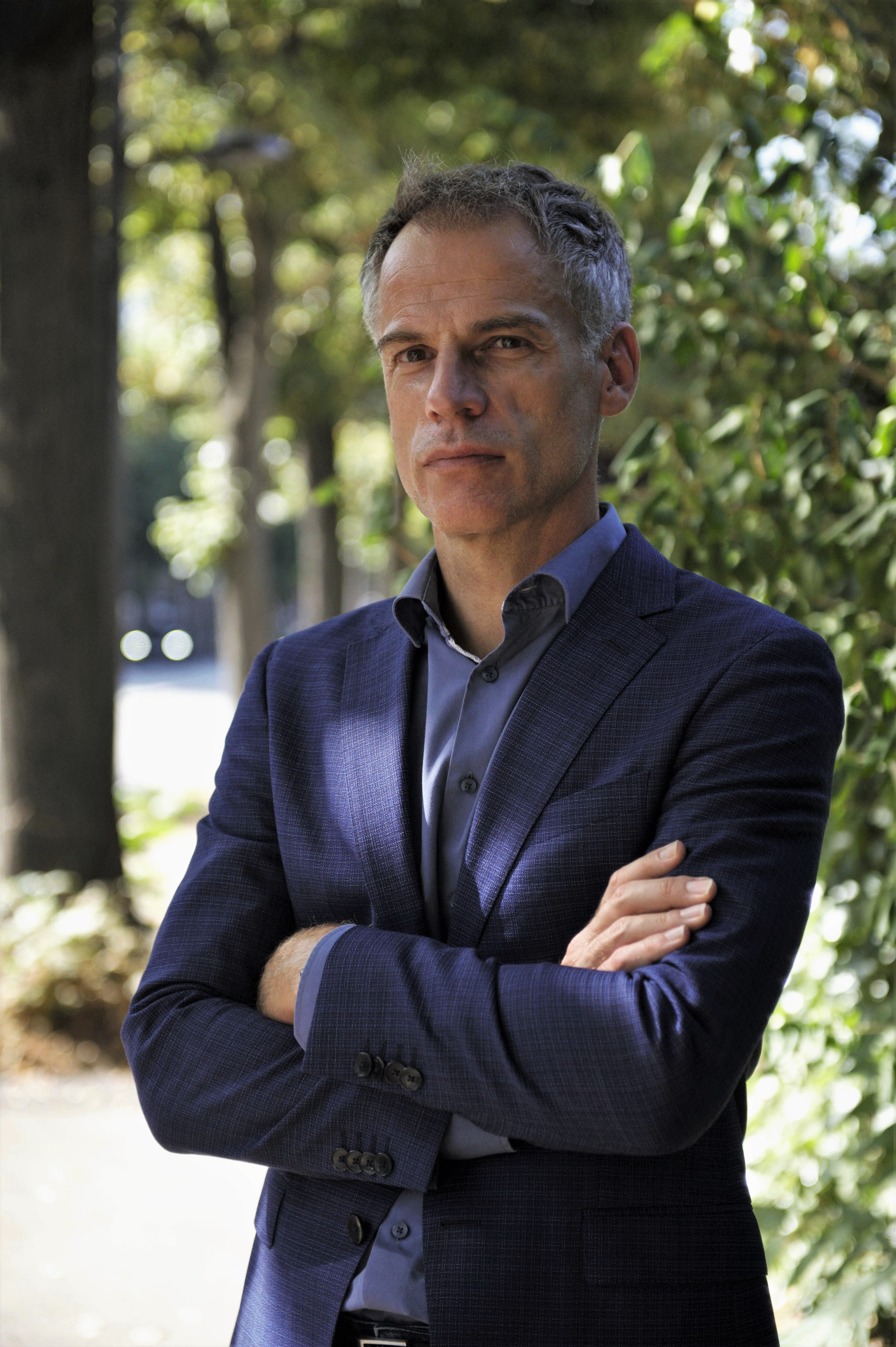

Member of the National Assembly for Haute-Garonne's 10th constituency
- In office 21 June 2017 – 21 June 2022
- Preceded by: Kader Arif
- Succeeded by: Dominique Faure

Personal details
- Born: 8 July 1972 (age 53) Fleurance, France
- Party: MDP; LREM (2017-2019); EDS (2020 onwards)

Sébastien Nadot (born 8 July 1972 in Fleurance (Gers)), is a French historian, writer and politician. In the 2017 elections, he was elected as a member of La République En Marche! to the French National Assembly, representing the department of Haute-Garonne's 10th constituency. In December 2018, he was excluded from LREM for having voted against the 2019 draft budget. In May 2020, he was one of the 17 initial members of the new Ecology Democracy Solidarity group in the National Assembly.

Nadot was an associate professor of physical education and sports, also a doctor of history. He was an associate member of the EESC (Economic, Social and Environmental Council), employment and labor section, from December 2015 to 18 June 2017. He is a member of the Parliamentary Assembly of La Francophonie. Sitting on the Foreign Affairs Committee, after officially calling on the government in a written question, he is against the sale of French weapons used by Saudi Arabia and the United Arab Emirates to bomb the civilian population of Yemen on a daily basis. In an interview given on the program "Quotidien" of 23 February 2018 presented by Yann Barthès he clearly asks to suspend arms sales to Arab states of the Persian Gulf that use it on civilian populations, in line with a resolution of the European Parliament. On 6 April 2018 he filed a request for the opening of a commission of inquiry to the National Assembly on the respect of France's international commitments with regard to arms export licenses in Yemen. He is also very involved on the issue of human rights in Cameroon, stressing the risks of an eruption of violence in the English-speaking area which is reminiscent of the process that led to the genocide in Rwanda.

He co-organised and chaired the international colloquium "Dialoguer Entre Ennemis" in May 2021, to which participated 2018 Nobel Prize Denis Mukwege, Sinn Féin's former president Gerry Adams, former Knesset President Avraham Burg among others. The aim of this colloquium was to build exchanges between former enemies about the peaceful resolution of conflicts. The five geographical areas tackled were Democratic Republic of Congo, Northern Ireland, Colombia, Israel and the Basque Country.

== Academic career ==
Nadot has taught at various secondary and university educational institutions and Apprenticeship Training Center (Mantes-la-Jolie, Orleans, Bourges, Nice, Toulouse, several institutions of Haute-Garonne). Holder of a PhD in history and civilizations from EHESS Paris (2009), he also taught history at the University of Orleans (1998-2003) and the University of Nice (2005-2008). In 2015/2016, he follows a preparation at ENA in continuing education at the Institute of Political Studies of Toulouse.

His academic work focuses on the history of the body, physical practices and education. His thesis and his recent work make it possible to approach sport in its anthropological continuum, from ancient Greece and its Olympic Games, to the present day. The contours of the current sport and their complexity would be largely related to the strong relationship of corporal practices with the media. In contrast to the work of Norbert Elias, who links the birth of sport to a lowering of the degree of violence in practice and to the advent of a specific ethic, his theory is not contrary to certain ideas of Pierre de Coubertin who wrote about the medieval knight that "The sporting passion takes hold of him, lifts him up and, through him and through him, will spread throughout all of Western Europe from Germany, Spain, from Italy to England, France serving as a central hub for movement "

Inspired by the ideas of Georges Duby and Eric Hobsbawm, his work also focuses on the relationship between men and their territories and on the notion of human networks through the example of the orders of chivalry or the heralds of arms: the construction of a sporting code of conduct predates the eighteenth century.

In his thesis titled Jousts, "pas d'armes" and "emprises d'armes" in Castile, Burgundy and France (1428-1470), Sébastien Nadot shows that sport already existed in the fifteenth century and that, therefore, sport was not born in France nor England in the 19th century.

This historical vision opens a breach in a building built on the basis of the work of Norbert Elias. In addition to this contribution in break with the widespread doxa (see on this subject the works of synthesis of Georges Vigarello), it also showed that the organization of the chivalry around European contests works like a system in elaborate network. Sébastien Nadot evokes an "International chivalrous", sharing the same codes, especially at the approach of tournaments and games. These sporting events go beyond the borders and are accompanied by a common cultural base, in which are courtesy, fair play, honor and loyalty. Part of the thesis attempts to demonstrate that medieval sports events are first-class communication media, prefiguration of the modern Olympic Games. Political, diplomatic and financial issues are emerging behind the greatest medieval spectacle. Specialist games, Sébastien Nadot is more interested in the sporting phenomenon, the notion of conflict (physical or verbal) and also the "revival" of the Middle Ages in the twenty-first century. His work on chivalric orders, knightly journeys and heralds of arms also led to a reflection on medieval social networks.

On the other hand, if sport was not born with the British industrial revolution within the bourgeoisie, it calls into question its "capitalist" essence and questions its nature as a terrain of ideological struggles.

Starting from the results of his investigation of medieval chivalric combats, Sébastien Nadot proposes a new theory of the evolution of sport. In each era, the ruling class would try through sport to impose on others its values and beyond, its superiority. Sport is therefore today the expression of neo-conservative liberalism. The idea of its birth in the early nineteenth century would be the expression of the new domination of the bourgeoisie. The belief in the birth of sport ex-nihilo in England at this time would be a confusion with a process of increased democratization, especially in its gradual opening to women.

These works are to be placed in a wider debate: the dedicated authors of the history of sport (Norbert Elias, Allen Guttmann) consider that modern sport emerges only at the turn of the eighteenth century and nineteenth century, the specialists of medieval and modern periods claiming the right to use this concept, even though many of the criteria of modern sport do not end up before the nineteenth century.

== Political career ==
Citizen candidate for the 2017 presidential election supported by the Progressists Movement, which promotes a new democratic dynamic around three pillars: social progress that benefits all, the environmental filter posed prior to any public decision and the participation of citizens decision-making phases of political action. He says he wants to erase the line between the political elite and the citizens. His candidacy was initially to be inserted in the primary citizen of 2017 but the first secretary of the PS Jean-Christophe Cambadélis withdrew it. To block François Fillon and Marine Le Pen, he made a call to the gathering of "progressive forces" for the presidential election addressed to Emmanuel Macron, Jean-Luc Mélenchon, Charlotte Marchandise and Yannick Jadot.

He is the first French politician to have used an augmented reality campaign poster.

In January 2017, Nadot published a political tale titled Reinette 2.0. In this novel, he discusses the relationship between democracy, the Internet and social networks.

In February 2017, faced with the difficulty of collecting the 500 sponsorships needed to run for the presidential election, he announced his withdrawal, to support Emmanuel Macron personally and joined the political council of En marche!

Nadot was selected by En Marche! to be their candidate in the legislative elections on the 10th district of Haute-Garonne. He was elected with 60.7% of the votes in the second round. In parliament, he serves on the Committee on Foreign Affairs. In addition to his committee assignments, he chairs the France - Québec Parliamentary Friendship Group.

In 2018, Nadot and 15 other co-signatories officially filed a request for a commission of inquiry into the legality of French weapons sales to the Saudi-led coalition fighting in Yemen, days before an official visit of Saudi Crown Prince Mohammed bin Salman to Paris.

During the end of 2020 and the beginning of 2021 Sébastien Nadot supported the cause of Catalan parliamentarians imprisoned in Spain. He has defended their right to exercise their European parliamentary mandate, as their parliamentary immunity was lifted. He asked French European and Foreign Affairs Minister Jean-Yves Le Drian about this matter to which the Minister replied by affirming his support to the Spanish rule of law and to the European Parliament's power to lift the immunity. Nadot visited the Catalan Parliament in order to reaffirm his support to imprisoned parliamentarians.

On 5 May 2021 he became president of the newly created parliamentary inquiry commission on migrations, population displacements and the conditions of life and access to law for migrants, refugees and stateless regarding France's national, European and international commitments. It aims to confront the application of the law regarding France's values and principles, as well as its international commitments.

On 2 March 2022, he announced he would not be standing in the 2022 French legislative election.

== Bibliography ==
Cameroon? We all have to stop this comedy, Teham Ed., Paris, 2020.

== See also ==
- 2017 French legislative election
