= Sandrine Mörch =

French politician (born 1961)

Member of the National Assembly for Haute-Garonne's 9th constituency
- In office 21 June 2017 – 21 June 2022
- Preceded by: Christophe Borgel
- Succeeded by: Christine Arrighi

Personal details
- Born: 13 November 1961 (age 64) Issy-les-Moulineaux, France
- Party: La République En Marche!
- Education: CUEJ
- Profession: Journalist

Sandrine Mörch (born 13 November 1961) is a French journalist and politician of La République En Marche! (LREM) who served as a member of the French National Assembly from 2017 to 2022, representing the 9th constituency of the Haute-Garonne department.

== Political career ==
In parliament, Mörch served as member of the Committee on Cultural Affairs and Education. In addition to her committee assignments, she was a member of the French-British Parliamentary Friendship Group. In 2019, she became a member of the French delegation to the Franco-German Parliamentary Assembly.

She lost her seat to Christine Arrighi from EELV (NUPES)in the 2022 French legislative election.

== Political positions ==
On immigration, Mörch is considered to be part of her parliamentary group's more liberal wing. In late 2019, she was among the critics of the government's legislative proposals on immigrations and instead join 17 LREM member who recommended, in particular, greater access to the labour market for migrants, but also "specific measures for collaboration with the authorities of safe countries, such as Albania and Georgia, in order to inform candidates for departure, in their country of origin, of what the asylum application really is."

In 2020, Mörch was one of ten LREM members who voted against her parliamentary group's majority and opposed a much discussed security bill drafted by her colleagues Alice Thourot and Jean-Michel Fauvergue that helps, among other measures, curtail the filming of police forces.

== Personal life ==
In March 2020, Mörch tested positive for coronavirus.

== See also ==
- 2017 French legislative election
