= Haute-Garonne's 5th constituency =

Constituency of the National Assembly of France

5th constituency of Haute-Garonne
- inline Constituency of the National Assembly of France

- Location of constituency in Department

- Location of Haute-Garonne in France
- Deputy: Jean-François Portarrieu; RE
- Department: Haute-Garonne

The 5th constituency of Haute-Garonne is a French legislative constituency in the Haute-Garonne département.

== Deputies ==
Election	Member	Party
1988	Jacques Roger-Machart	PS
1993	Grégoire Carneiro	RPR
1997	Françoise Imbert	PS
2002	Françoise Imbert	PS
2007	Françoise Imbert	PS
2012	Françoise Imbert	PS
2017	Jean-François Portarrieu	LREM
2022	Jean-François Portarrieu	RE
2024	Jean-François Portarrieu	RE

== Election results ==
=== 2024 ===
Candidate	Party	Alliance	First round			Second round		
Candidate	Party	Alliance	Votes	%	+/–	Votes	%	+/–
Julien Leonardelli	RN		29,897	39.52	+14.88	32,338	43.78	new
Jean-François Portarrieu	HOR	Ensemble	22,267	29.43	+0.52	41,533	56.22	+4.33
Sylvie Espagnolle	LFI	NFP	20,925	27.66	-0.19	withdrew		
Dominique Piussan	REC		1,443	1.91	-2.40			
Michel Laserge	LO		1,000	1.32	+0.38			
Sylvie Bonnemaison	RES!		121	0.16	new			
Votes			75,653	100.00		73,871	100.00	
Valid votes			75,653	96.67	-1.04	73,871	94.77	+4.30
Blank votes			1,933	2.47	+0.87	2,973	3.81	-2.59
Null votes			672	0.86	+0.17	1,105	1.42	-1.72
Turnout			78,258	71.94	+21.70	77,949	71.63	+23.93
Abstentions			30,538	28.06	-21.70	30,870	28.37	-23.93
Registered voters			108,786			108,819		
Result			RE HOLD					

=== 2022 ===
Legislative Election 2022: Haute-Garonne's 5th constituency
Party	Candidate	Votes	%	±%
LREM (Ensemble)	Jean-François Portarrieu	15,174	28.91	-8.75
LFI (NUPÉS)	Sylvie Espagnolle	14,615	27.85	-2.44
RN	Julien Leonardelli	12,931	24.64	+7.97
REC	Bruno Hontans	2,260	4.31	N/A
LR	Jean-Christophe Cheronnet	1,743	3.32	−7.88
PRG	Alizée Mosdier	1,479	2.82	N/A
REG	Jérôme Piques	1,160	2.21	N/A
Others	N/A	3,116		
Turnout		53,707	50.24	−0.94
2nd round result
LREM (Ensemble)	Jean-François Portarrieu	23,948	51.89	-15.71
LFI (NUPÉS)	Sylvie Espagnolle	22,201	48.11	N/A
Turnout		46,149	47.70	+3.49
LREM hold				

=== 2017 ===
Candidate	Label	First round		Second round	
Candidate	Label	Votes	%	Votes	%
Jean-François Portarrieu	REM	18,588	37.66	26,091	67.60
Julien Leonardelli	FN	8,229	16.67	12,504	32.40
Sylvie Espagnolle-Labrune	FI	7,134	14.45		
Jean-Marc Dumoulin	UDI	5,526	11.20		
Sandrine Floureusses	PS	5,454	11.05		
Clémentine Renaud	ECO	1,561	3.16		
Monique Marconis	PCF	805	1.63		
Raimon Sabater	DIV	618	1.25		
Romain Roumieu	DIV	450	0.91		
Maryse Fontenelle	ECO	347	0.70		
Vincent Combes	EXG	343	0.69		
Marie Fourage	ECO	201	0.41		
Charles Hue	DVG	51	0.10		
Marie-Yvonnette Promi	ECO	48	0.10		
Votes		49,355	100.00	38,595	100.00
Valid votes		49,355	98.02	38,595	88.73
Blank votes		717	1.42	3,529	8.11
Null votes		280	0.56	1,371	3.15
Turnout		50,352	51.18	43,495	44.21
Abstentions		48,031	48.82	54,889	55.79
Registered voters		98,383		98,384	
Source: Ministry of the Interior

=== 2012 ===
2012 legislative election in Haute-Garonne's 5th constituency
Candidate	Party	First round		Second round	
Candidate	Party	Votes	%	Votes	%
Françoise Imbert	PS	24,129	44.60%	30,076	61.41%
Grégoire Carneiro	UMP	13,371	24.72%	18,900	38.59%
Guy Jovelin	FN	8,935	16.52%		
Monique Marconis	FG	3,422	6.33%		
Raphaël Quessada	PR	1,202	2.22%		
Martine Boudet	EELV	1,130	2.09%		
Olivier Lecoq-Kromwel	AEI	457	0.84%		
Vincent Combes	LO	308	0.57%		
Eric Mahuet	PP	295	0.55%		
Michel Raynal	MEI	283	0.52%		
François Jouglar	NPA	258	0.48%		
Alain Van Gaver	MPF	170	0.31%		
Vincent Crousier	SP	137	0.25%		
Valid votes		54,097	98.48%	48,976	96.20%
Spoilt and null votes		834	1.52%	1,936	3.80%
Votes cast / turnout		54,931	60.80%	50,912	56.35%
Abstentions		35,422	39.20%	39,436	43.65%
Registered voters		90,353	100.00%	90,348	100.00%

=== 2007 ===
Legislative Election 2007: Haute-Garonne's 5th constituency
Party	Candidate	Votes	%	±%
PS	Françoise Imbert	33,092	38.46	
UMP	Grégoire Carneiro	29,972	34.84	
MoDem	Gilles Broquere	8,153	9.48	
FN	Charles Soeur	2,975	3.46	
Far left	Laurent Marty	2,482	2.88	
LV	Georgette Sauvaire	2,454	2.85	
PCF	Delio Menen	2,075	2.41	
Others	N/A	4,832		
Turnout		87,568	63.29	
2nd round result
PS	Françoise Imbert	49,281	57.87	
UMP	Grégoire Carneiro	35,877	42.13	
Turnout		87,655	63.36	
PS hold				

=== 2002 ===
Legislative Election 2002: Haute-Garonne's 5th constituency
Party	Candidate	Votes	%	±%
PS	Françoise Imbert	31,599	38.71	
UMP	Genevieve de Cazaux	19,231	23.56	
FN	Marie-France Courteil	9,402	11.52	
UDF	Jean-Loup Thomazo	7,229	8.86	
PCF	Monique Marconis	2,541	3.11	
LV	Philippe Sabatier	2,188	2.68	
LCR	Lucien Sanchez	1,958	2.40	
Others	N/A	7,489		
Turnout		83,591	69.58	
2nd round result
PS	Françoise Imbert	41,539	56.88	
UMP	Genevieve de Cazaux	31,492	43.12	
Turnout		76,289	63.51	
PS hold				

=== 1997 ===
Legislative Election 1997: Haute-Garonne's 5th constituency
Party	Candidate	Votes	%	±%
PS	Françoise Imbert	26,095	35.92	
RPR	Grégoire Carneiro	18,467	25.42	
FN	Henri Balssa	9,976	13.73	
PCF	Pierre Seube	6,276	8.64	
LO	Michèle Puel	2,473	3.40	
DVE	Nicole Descamps	1,678	2.31	
DVD	Marc de Nuce	1,486	2.05	
Others	N/A	6,190		
Turnout		76,615	73.06	
2nd round result
PS	Françoise Imbert	45,531	60.37	
RPR	Grégoire Carneiro	29,884	39.63	
Turnout		80,433	76.70	
PS gain from RPR				
