= Haute-Garonne's 9th constituency =

Constituency of the National Assembly of France

9th constituency of Haute-Garonne
- inline Constituency of the National Assembly of France

- Location of constituency in Department

- Location of Haute-Garonne in France
- Deputy: Christine Arrighi; LE
- Department: Haute-Garonne

The 9th constituency of Haute-Garonne is a French legislative constituency in the Haute-Garonne département. Like the other 576 French constituencies, it elects one MP using a two round electoral system.

It was created in 2010, with the first election in 2012. It consists of the Canton of Portet-sur-Garonne, part of the Canton of Toulouse-9 and the Cantons of Toulouse-10 and 11.

== Deputies ==
Election	Member	Party
2012	Christophe Borgel	PS
2017	Sandrine Mörch	LREM
2022	Christine Arrighi	EELV
2024	Christine Arrighi	LE

== Election results ==
=== 2024 ===
Candidate	Party	Alliance	First round			Second round		
Candidate	Party	Alliance	Votes	%	+/–	Votes	%	+/–
Christine Arrighi	LE	NFP	26,472	47.53	+7.76	30,177	54.50	-4.05
Caroline Beout	RN		13,865	24.89	+10.67	14,775	26.68	new
Florian Delrieu	REN	Ensemble	12,451	22.36	-2.89	10,417	18.81	-22.64
Camille Clinet	DIV		1,202	2.16	new			
Christelle Filippi	REC		813	1.46	-3.14			
Henri Martin	LO		569	1.02	-0.08			
Nathanaëlle Loubet-Sruh	NPA		322	0.58	new			
Votes			55,694	100.00		55,369	100.00	
Valid votes			55,694	97.39	-0.81	55,369	97.60	+4.27
Blank votes			1,026	1.79	+0.57	979	1.73	-2.68
Null votes			469	0.82	+0.24	382	0.67	-1.59
Turnout			57,189	70.28	+18.94	56,730	69.71	+20.36
Abstentions			24,179	29.72	-18.94	24,648	30.29	-20.36
Registered voters			81,368			81,378		
Result			LE HOLD					

=== 2022 ===
Legislative Election 2022: Haute-Garonne's 9th constituency
Party	Candidate	Votes	%	±%
EELV (NUPÉS)	Christine Arrighi	16,167	39.77	-0.09
LREM (Ensemble)	Sandrine Mörch	10,265	25.25	-11.71
RN	Thomas Barkats	5,781	14.22	+3.58
FGR	Paul Rumler	1,998	4.91	N/A
LR (UDC)	Cecile Dufraisse	1,954	4.81	−4.12
REC	Jérôme Audisio	1,869	4.60	N/A
DVE	Robert Baud	1,326	3.26	N/A
Others	N/A	1,294		
Turnout		41,399	51.34	+1.97
2nd round result
EELV (NUPÉS)	Christine Arrighi	21,748	58.55	+10.88
LREM (Ensemble)	Sandrine Mörch	15,399	41.45	−10.88
Turnout		37,147	49.35	+5.99
EELV gain from LREM				

=== 2017 ===
Candidate	Label	First round		Second round	
Candidate	Label	Votes	%	Votes	%
Sandrine Mörch	REM	14,231	36.96	16,458	52.33
Manuel Bompard	FI	7,282	18.91	14,991	47.67
Christophe Borgel	PS	5,175	13.44		
Eloïse Teriitaumihau	FN	4,097	10.64		
Simone Pauzin-Fournié	LR	3,439	8.93		
Christine Arrighi	ECO	2,186	5.68		
Véronique Blanstier	PCF	706	1.83		
Bastien Bouet-Announ	DIV	426	1.11		
Amélia François	DIV	311	0.81		
Henri Martin	EXG	295	0.77		
Rivo Rakotomavo	DVG	236	0.61		
Colette Charbonné-Fardella	ECO	71	0.18		
Sabrina Isidore	ECO	46	0.12		
Votes		38,501	100.00	31,449	100.00
Valid votes		38,501	98.21	31,449	91.34
Blank votes		505	1.29	2,021	5.87
Null votes		195	0.50	959	2.79
Turnout		39,201	49.37	34,429	43.36
Abstentions		40,196	50.63	44,968	56.64
Registered voters		79,397		79,397	
Source: Ministry of the Interior

=== 2012 ===
2012 legislative election in Haute-Garonne's 9th constituency
Candidate	Party	First round		Second round	
Candidate	Party	Votes	%	Votes	%
Christophe Borgel	PS	12,697	29.88%	24,825	64.62%
Elisabeth Pouchelon	UMP	8,789	20.68%	13,589	35.38%
Thierry Cotelle	MRC	6,394	15.04%		
Théo Buras	FN	5,086	11.97%		
Jean-Marc Bares	FG	3,953	9.30%		
Christine Arrighi	EELV	2,651	6.24%		
Eric Gautier	MoDem	1,506	3.54%		
Raphaël Durand	PP	360	0.85%		
Marie-Pierre Rockstroh-Rosso	AEI	290	0.68%		
Patrick Brisset	NPA	238	0.56%		
Zohra Slimane		232	0.55%		
Henri Martin	LO	204	0.48%		
Claire Crousier Arniella	SP	100	0.24%		
Valid votes		42,500	98.64%	38,414	95.16%
Spoilt and null votes		584	1.36%	1,952	4.84%
Votes cast / turnout		43,084	56.40%	40,366	52.84%
Abstentions		33,309	43.60%	36,022	47.16%
Registered voters		76,393	100.00%	76,388	100.00%
