= Haute-Garonne's 2nd constituency =

Constituency of the National Assembly of France

2nd constituency of Haute-Garonne
- inline Constituency of the National Assembly of France

- Location of constituency in Department

- Location of Haute-Garonne in France
- Deputy: Anne Stambach-Terrenoir; LFI
- Department: Haute-Garonne

The 2nd constituency of Haute-Garonne is a French legislative constituency in the Haute-Garonne département.

== Deputies ==
Election	Member	Party
1988	Gérard Bapt	PS
1993	Robert Huguenard	RPR
1997	Gérard Bapt	PS
2002	Gérard Bapt	PS
2007	Gérard Bapt	PS
2012	Gérard Bapt	PS
2017	Jean-Luc Lagleize	MoDem
2022	Anne Stambach-Terrenoir	LFI
2024	Anne Stambach-Terrenoir	LFI

== Election results ==
=== 2024 ===
Candidate	Party	Alliance	First round			Second round		
Candidate	Party	Alliance	Votes	%	+/–	Votes	%	+/–
Anne Stambach-Terrenoir	LFI	NFP	30,402	40.53	+3.28	33,063	44.41	-8.49
Jean-Luc Lagleize	MoDEM	Ensemble	20,934	27.91	+1.10	20,819	27.96	-19.14
Frank Khalifa	RN		19,815	26.41	+13.29	20,575	27.63	new
Pauline Lorans	REC		1,366	1.82	-2.52			
Maxime Mayoral	DIV		1,306	1.74	new			
Arthur Nestier	ECO		606	0.81	new			
Clotilde Barthélémy	LO		588	0.78	-0.01			
Votes			75,017	100.00		74,457	100.00	
Valid votes			75,017	97.17	-0.96	74,457	97.43	+4.41
Blank votes			1,540	1.99	+0.66	1,440	1.88	-2.70
Null votes			644	0.83	+0.29	524	0.69	-1.71
Turnout			77,201	72.42	+18.98	76,421	71.68	+19.79
Abstentions			29,396	27.58	-18.98	30,197	28.32	-19.79
Registered voters			106,597			106,618		
Result			LFI HOLD					

=== 2022 ===
Legislative Election 2022: Haute-Garonne's 2nd constituency
Party	Candidate	Votes	%	±%
LFI (NUPÉS)	Anne Stambach-Terrenoir	20,570	37.25	-0.72
MoDem (Ensemble)	Jean-Luc Lagleize	14,807	26.81	-10.80
RN	Sonia Teychene	7,245	13.12	+3.16
DVG	Gilles Joviado	3,840	6.95	N/A
LR (UDC)	Christine Gennaro-Saint	3,174	5.75	−5.56
REC	Pauline Lorans	2,397	4.34	N/A
Others	N/A	3,193		
Turnout		56,279	53.44	+1.74
2nd round result
LFI (NUPÉS)	Anne Stambach-Terrenoir	26,895	52.90	+8.93
MoDem (Ensemble)	Jean-Luc Lagleize	23,946	47.10	−8.93
Turnout		50,841	51.89	+7.49
LFI gain from MoDem				

=== 2017 ===
Candidate	Label	First round		Second round	
Candidate	Label	Votes	%	Votes	%
Jean-Luc Lagleize	MoDem	19,234	37.61	22,581	55.49
Anne Stambach-Terrenoir	FI	7,902	15.45	18,113	44.51
Gérard Bapt	PS	7,352	14.38		
Christine Gennaro-Saint	LR	5,786	11.31		
Nadine Alex	FN	5,095	9.96		
Salah Amokrane	ECO	3,072	6.01		
Serge Nicolo	PCF	1,087	2.13		
Yves Ribes	DLF	362	0.71		
Régine Papierski	DIV	352	0.69		
Clotilde Barthélémy	EXG	326	0.64		
Catherine Cathala	ECO	312	0.61		
Adrien-Jean Marquez-Velasco	ECO	257	0.50		
Votes		51,137	100.00	40,694	100.00
Valid votes		51,137	98.47	40,694	91.23
Blank votes		561	1.08	2,691	6.03
Null votes		236	0.45	1,223	2.74
Turnout		51,934	51.70	44,608	44.40
Abstentions		48,522	48.30	55,866	55.60
Registered voters		100,456		100,474	
Source: Ministry of the Interior

=== 2012 ===
2012 legislative election in Haute-Garonne's 2nd constituency
Candidate	Party	First round		Second round	
Candidate	Party	Votes	%	Votes	%
Gérard Bapt	PS	25,308	46.38%	32,035	64.93%
Nicolas Bonleux	UMP	11,803	21.63%	17,309	35.09%
Séverine Cavin	FN	6,799	12.46%		
Charles Marziani	FG	4,290	7.86%		
Cécile Peguin	EELV	2,427	4.45%		
André Gallego	PR–URCID	1,165	2.13%		
Raphaël Isla	PP	660	1.21%		
Jacqueline Escudie	AEI	540	0.99%		
Jean-Louis Thomas	DLR	511	0.94%		
Fanny Fontugne	NPA	289	0.53%		
Patrick Le Bihan	CNIP	245	0.45%		
Jean Alamichel		228	0.42%		
Michel Laserge	LO	181	0.33%		
Josette Auge		69	0.13%		
Jean-Claude Michavila		52	0.10%		
Valid votes		54,567	98.71%	49,334	96.78%
Spoilt and null votes		712	1.29%	1,641	3.22%
Votes cast / turnout		55,279	58.55%	50,975	53.99%
Abstentions		39,129	41.45%	43,445	46.01%
Registered voters		94,408	100.00%	94,420	100.00%

=== 2007 ===
Legislative Election 2007: Haute-Garonne's 2nd constituency
Party	Candidate	Votes	%	±%
UMP	Danièle Damin	25,587	36.41	
PS	Gérard Bapt	24,733	35.20	
MoDem	Thierry Bertrand	5,982	8.51	
NM	Maïthé Carsalade	2,795	3.98	
LV	Stéphane Coppey	2,793	3.97	
FN	Philippe Riey	2,336	3.32	
Far left	Julien Terrie	1,977	2.81	
PCF	Dominique Satge Sangely	1,941	2.76	
Others	N/A	2,124		
Turnout		71,198	64.35	
2nd round result
PS	Gérard Bapt	37,854	53.77	
UMP	Danièle Damin	32,548	46.23	
Turnout		72,268	65.32	
PS hold				

=== 2002 ===
Legislative Election 2002: Haute-Garonne's 2nd constituency
Party	Candidate	Votes	%	±%
PS	Gérard Bapt	24,524	35.85	
UMP	Danièle Damin	21,027	30.74	
FN	Philippe Riey	7,255	10.61	
UDF	Jean-Marc Dumoulin	4,918	7.19	
LV	Nicole Debedat	2,337	3.42	
PCF	Charles Marziani	1,862	2.72	
Others	N/A	6,482		
Turnout		69,798	69.93	
2nd round result
PS	Gérard Bapt	32,173	51.46	
UMP	Danièle Damin	30,348	48.54	
Turnout		65,071	65.20	
PS hold				

=== 1997 ===
Legislative Election 1997: Haute-Garonne's 2nd constituency
Party	Candidate	Votes	%	±%
PS	Gérard Bapt	20,692	34.37	
RPR	Robert Huguenard	16,566	27.51	
FN	Philippe Riey	8,464	14.06	
PCF	Charles Marziani	4,289	7.12	
LV	Elie Brugarolas	1,887	3.13	
LO	Elisabeth Podgorny	1,662	2.76	
DVD	Jean-Baptiste de Scorraille	1,464	2.43	
Others	N/A	5,187		
Turnout		63,414	70.11	
2nd round result
PS	Gérard Bapt	34,631	55.59	
RPR	Robert Huguenard	27,669	44.41	
Turnout		66,774	73.83	
PS gain from RPR				
