= Arrondissements of the Haute-Garonne department =

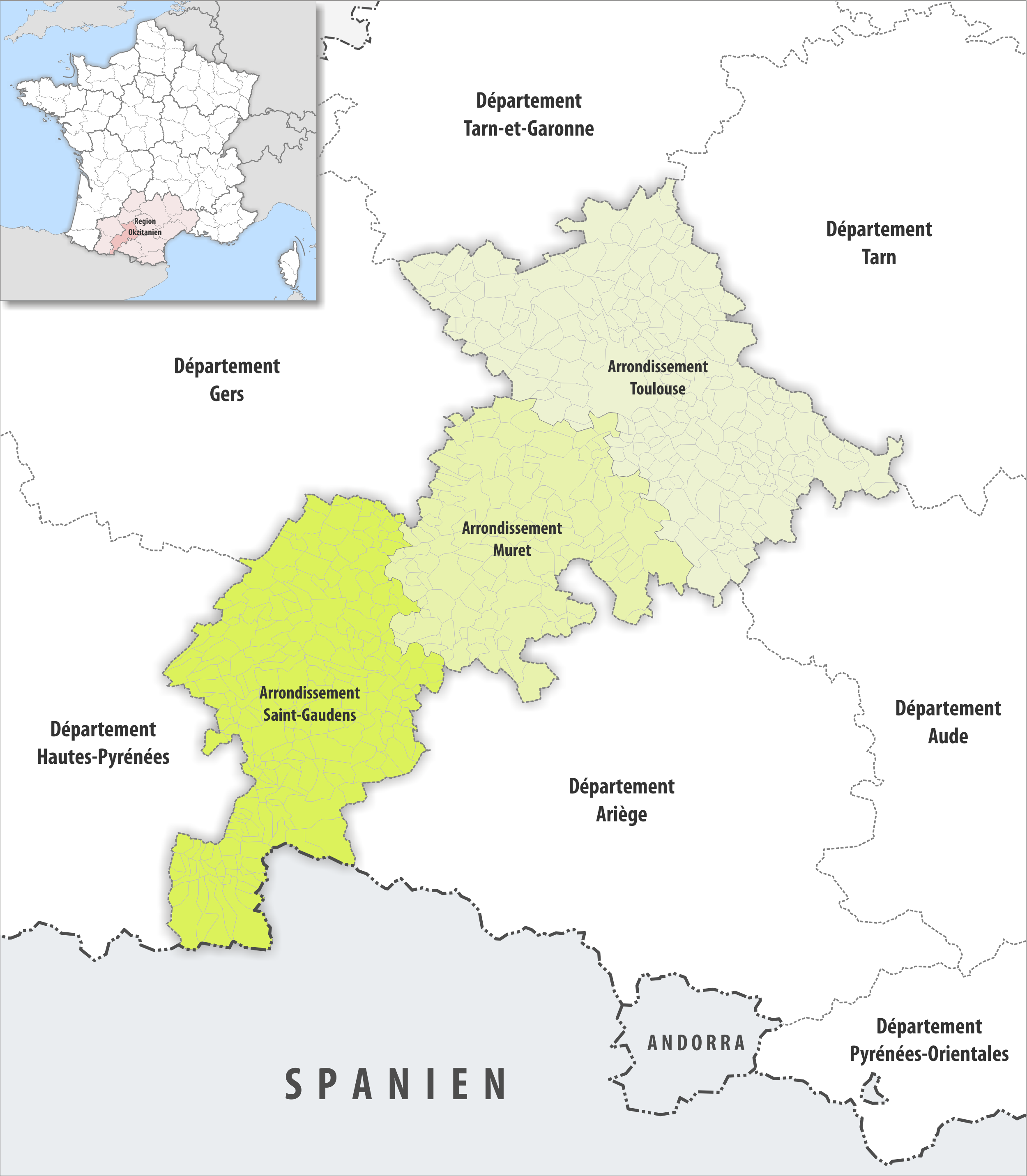
Map of arrondissements of the Haute-Garonne department.

The 3 arrondissements of the Haute-Garonne department are:

1. Arrondissement of Muret, (subprefecture: Muret) with 126 communes. The population of the arrondissement was 231,646 in 2021.
2. Arrondissement of Saint-Gaudens, (subprefecture: Saint-Gaudens) with 235 communes. The population of the arrondissement was 77,331 in 2021.
3. Arrondissement of Toulouse, (prefecture of the Haute-Garonne department: Toulouse) with 225 communes. The population of the arrondissement was 1,125,390 in 2021.

== History ==
In 1800 the arrondissements of Toulouse, Castelsarrasin, Muret, Saint-Gaudens and Villefranche were established. The arrondissement of Muret was disbanded in 1803, and restored in 1806. The arrondissement of Castelsarrasin ceded to the new department Tarn-et-Garonne in 1808. The arrondissements of Muret and Villefranche were disbanded in 1926, and Muret was restored again in 1942. In January 2017 the commune Auragne passed from the arrondissement of Toulouse to the arrondissement of Muret, and the commune Aignes passed from the arrondissement of Muret to the arrondissement of Toulouse.
