= Lanta, Haute-Garonne =

Lanta
- Commune
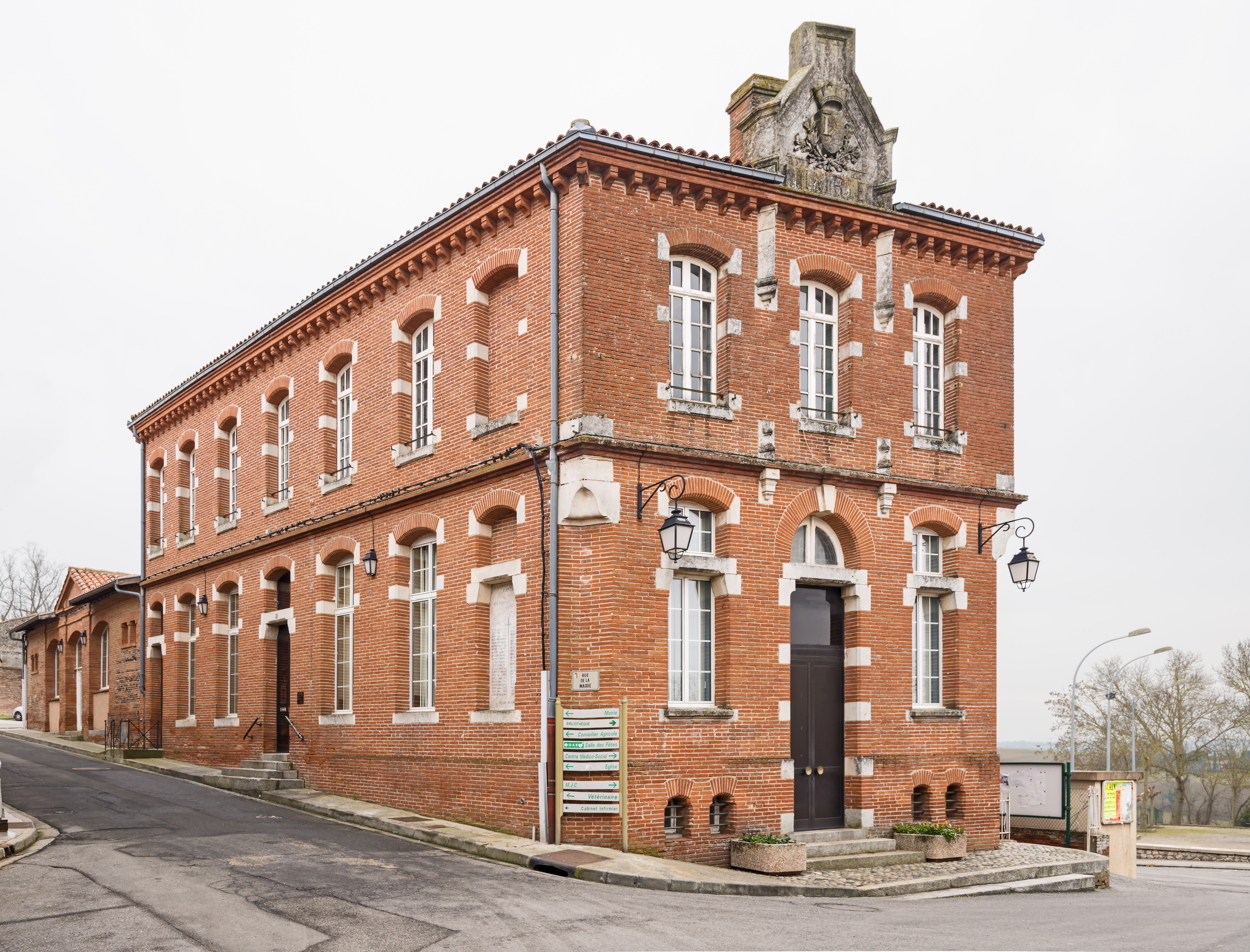
- The town hall in Lanta

- Coat of arms
- Location of Lanta
- Location within France Location within Occitanie
- Coordinates: 43°33′37″N 1°39′20″E
- Country: France
- Region: Occitania
- Department: Haute-Garonne
- Arrondissement: Toulouse
- Canton: Revel

Government
  - Mayor (2022–2026): Rémi Diaz
- Area^{1}: 30.12 km^{2} (11.63 sq mi)
- Elevation: 230 m (750 ft)
- Highest elevation: 275 m (902 ft)
- Lowest elevation: 159 m (522 ft)
- Population (2023): 2,283
  - Density: 75.80/km^{2} (196.3/sq mi)
- Time zone: UTC+01:00 (CET)
  - Summer (DST): UTC+02:00 (CEST)
- INSEE/Postal code: 31271 /31570
- ^{1} French Land Register data, which excludes lakes, ponds, glaciers > 1 km^{2} (0.386 sq mi or 247 acres) and river estuaries.

Lanta (French pronunciation: [lɑ̃ta]; Occitan: Lantar) is a commune in the Haute-Garonne department in southwestern France.

== History ==
The attempt of the capitoul Pierre Hunault, sieur de Lanta, to seize control of Toulouse's Capitol was the immediate cause of the 1562 riots there.

== Population ==
Historical population
Year	Pop.	±% p.a.
1968	874	—
1975	908	+0.55%
1982	1,026	+1.76%
1990	1,144	+1.37%
1999	1,175	+0.30%
2007	1,483	+2.95%
2012	1,775	+3.66%
2017	2,070	+3.12%
2023	2,283	+1.65%
Source: INSEE

== Monument ==
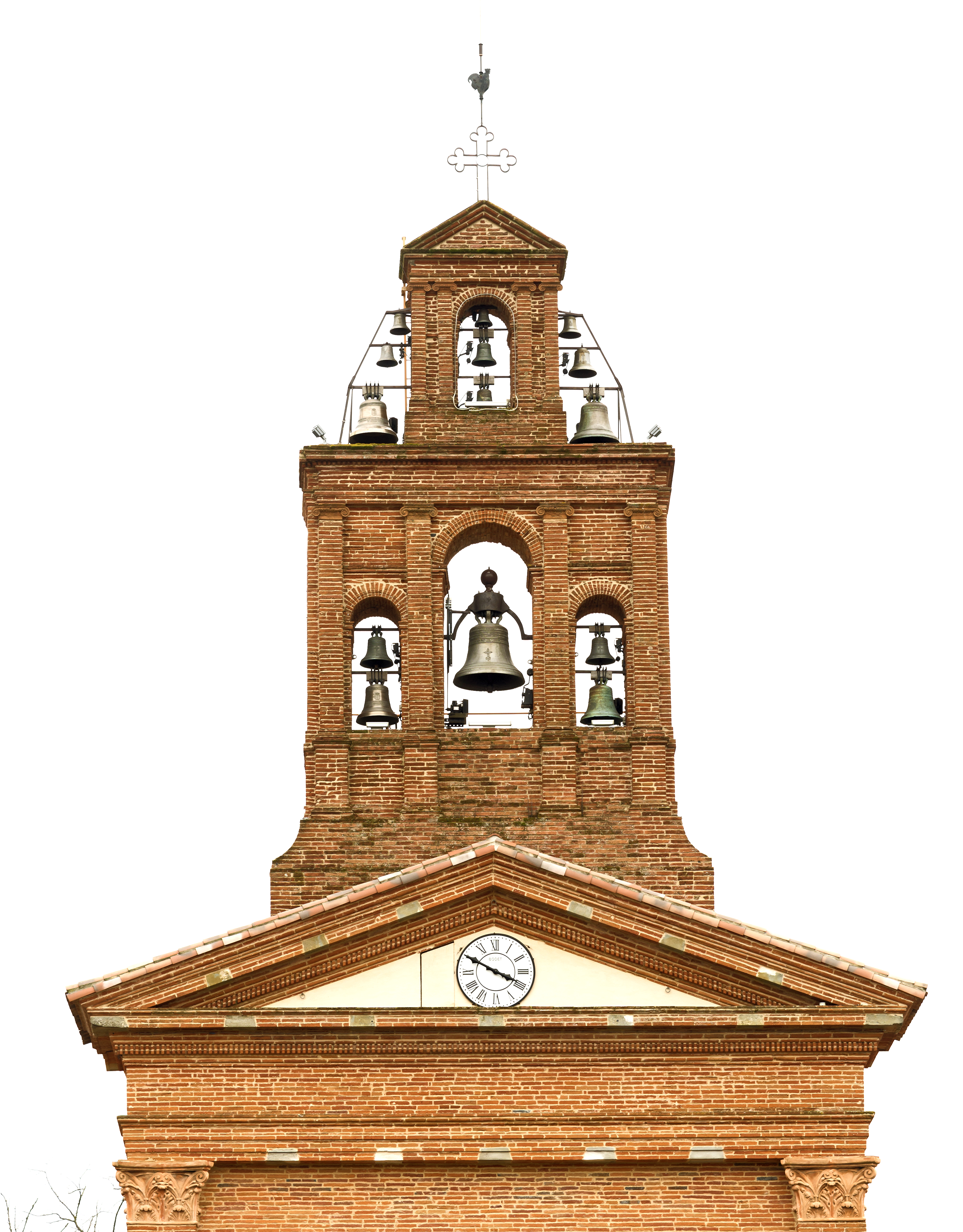
The bell gable

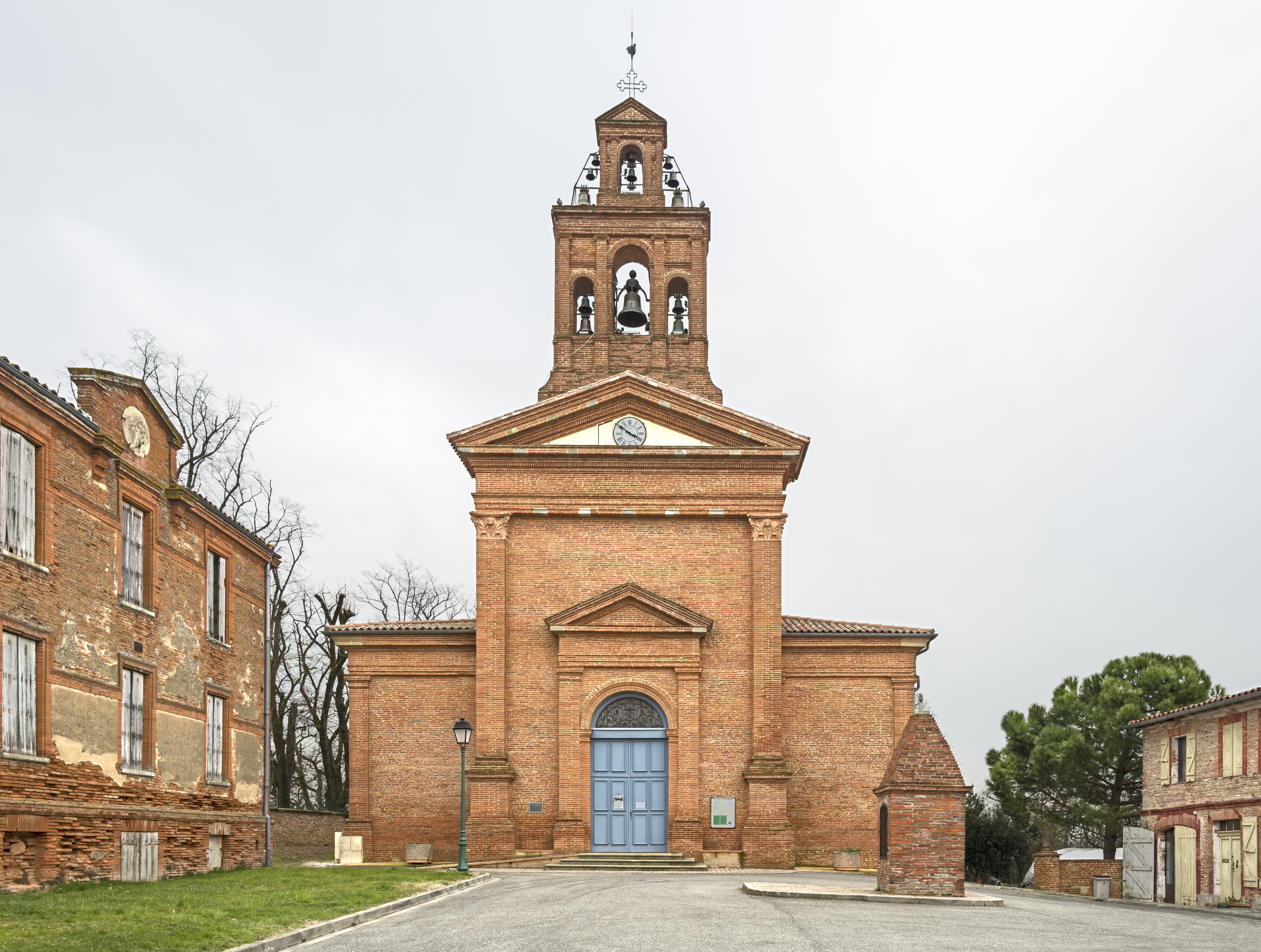
The Church of Our Lady of Lanta

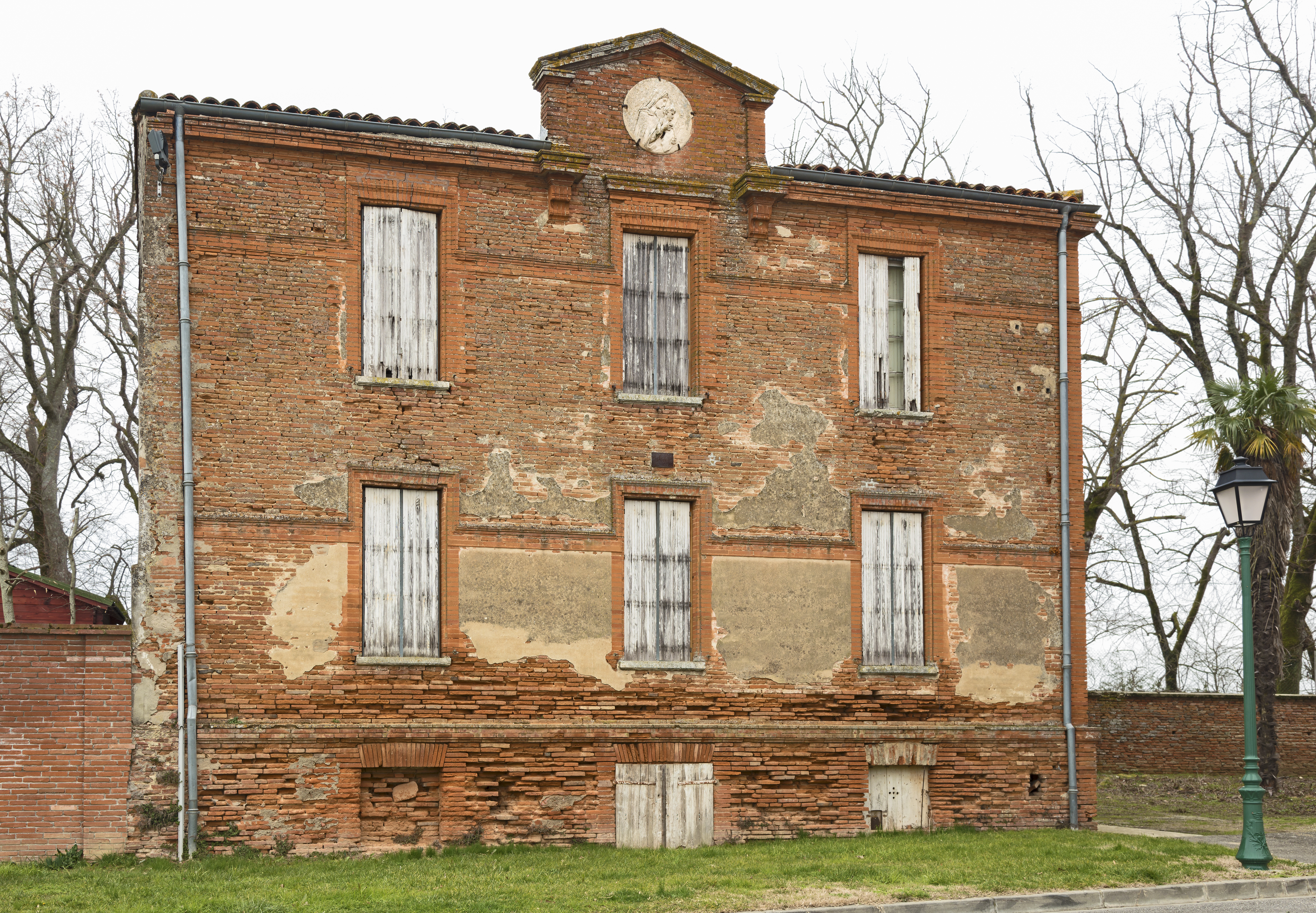
The facade of the old rectory.

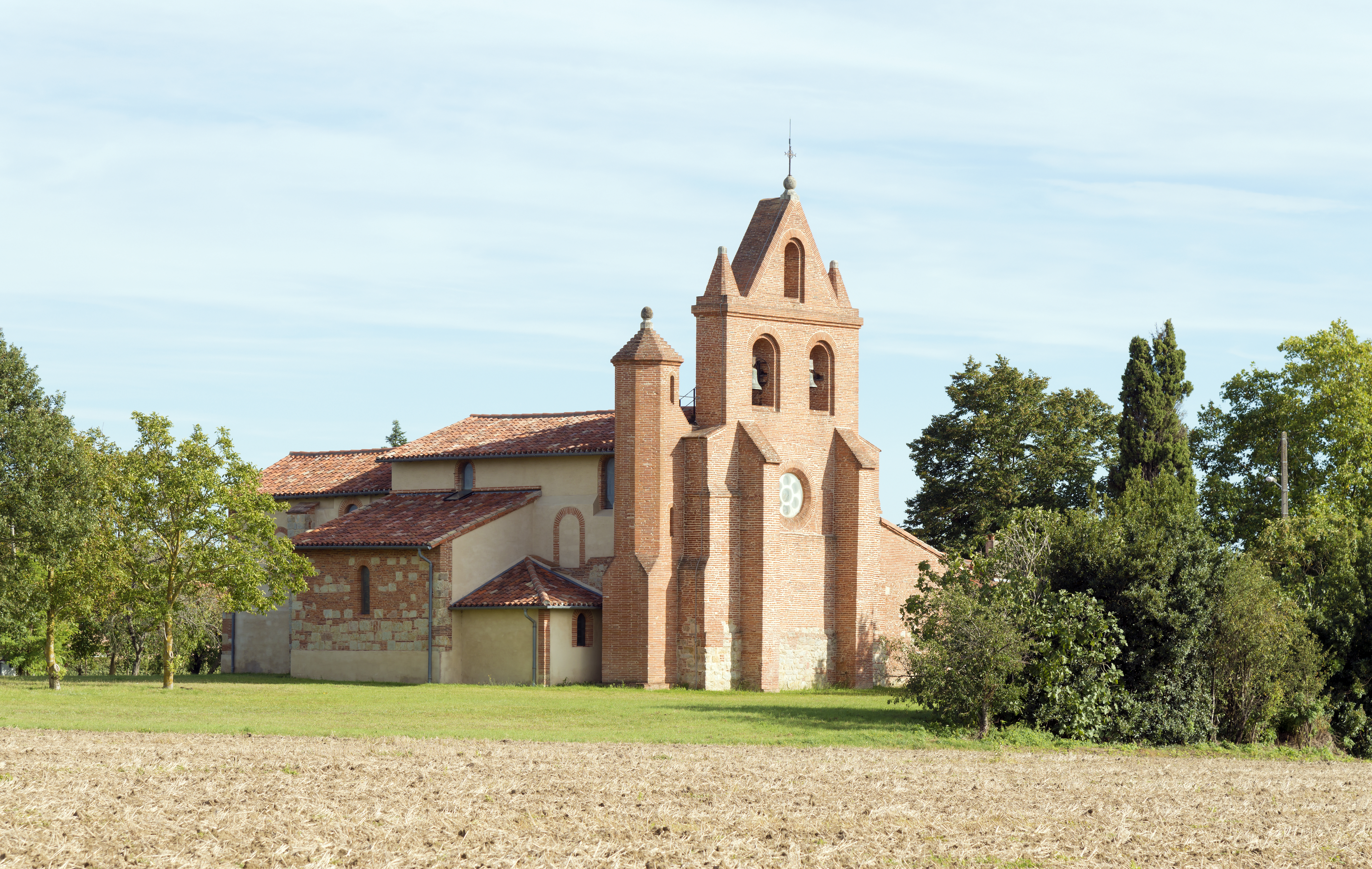
Lanta - Saint Anatoly

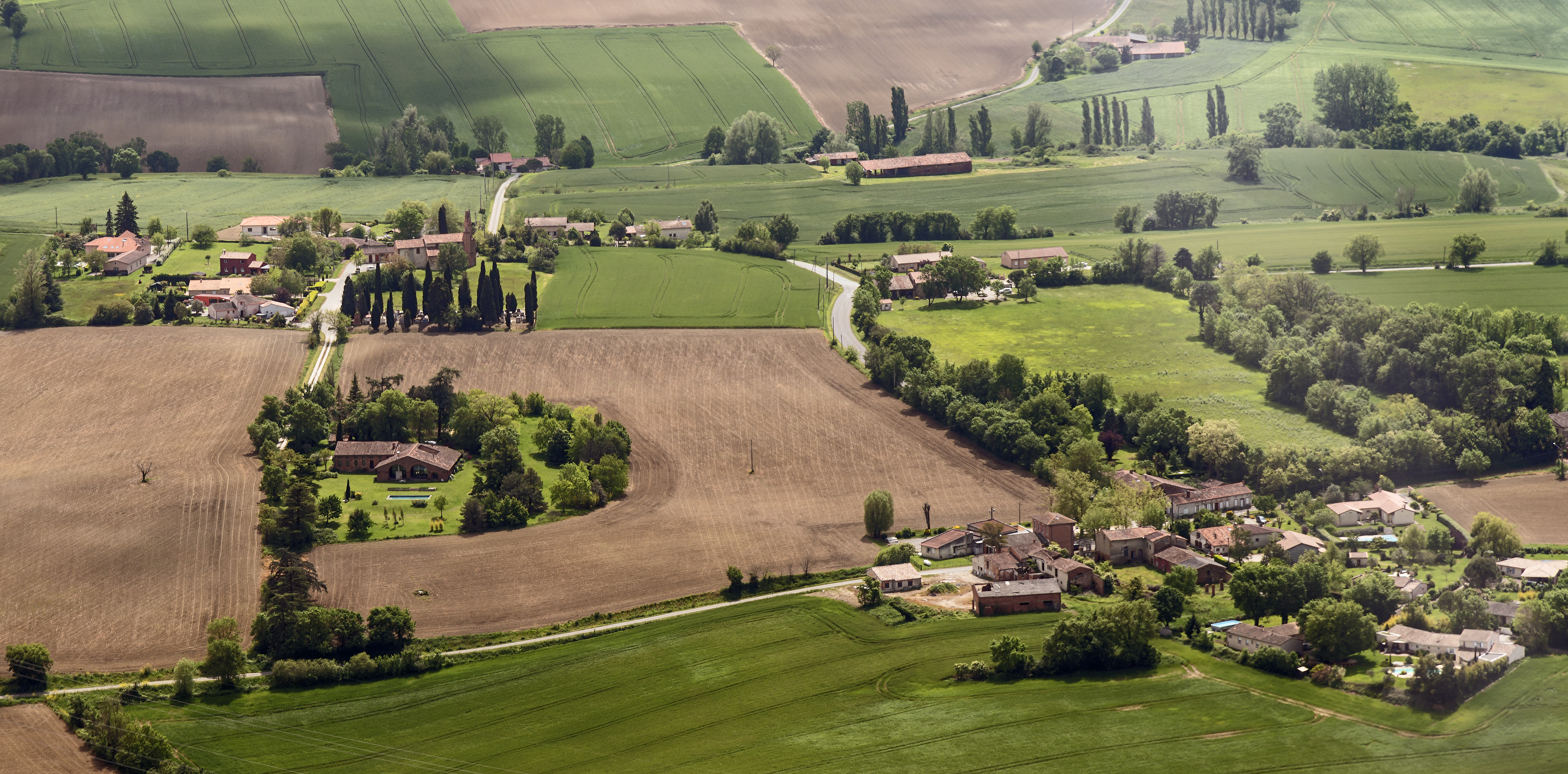
Saint Anatoly de Lanta

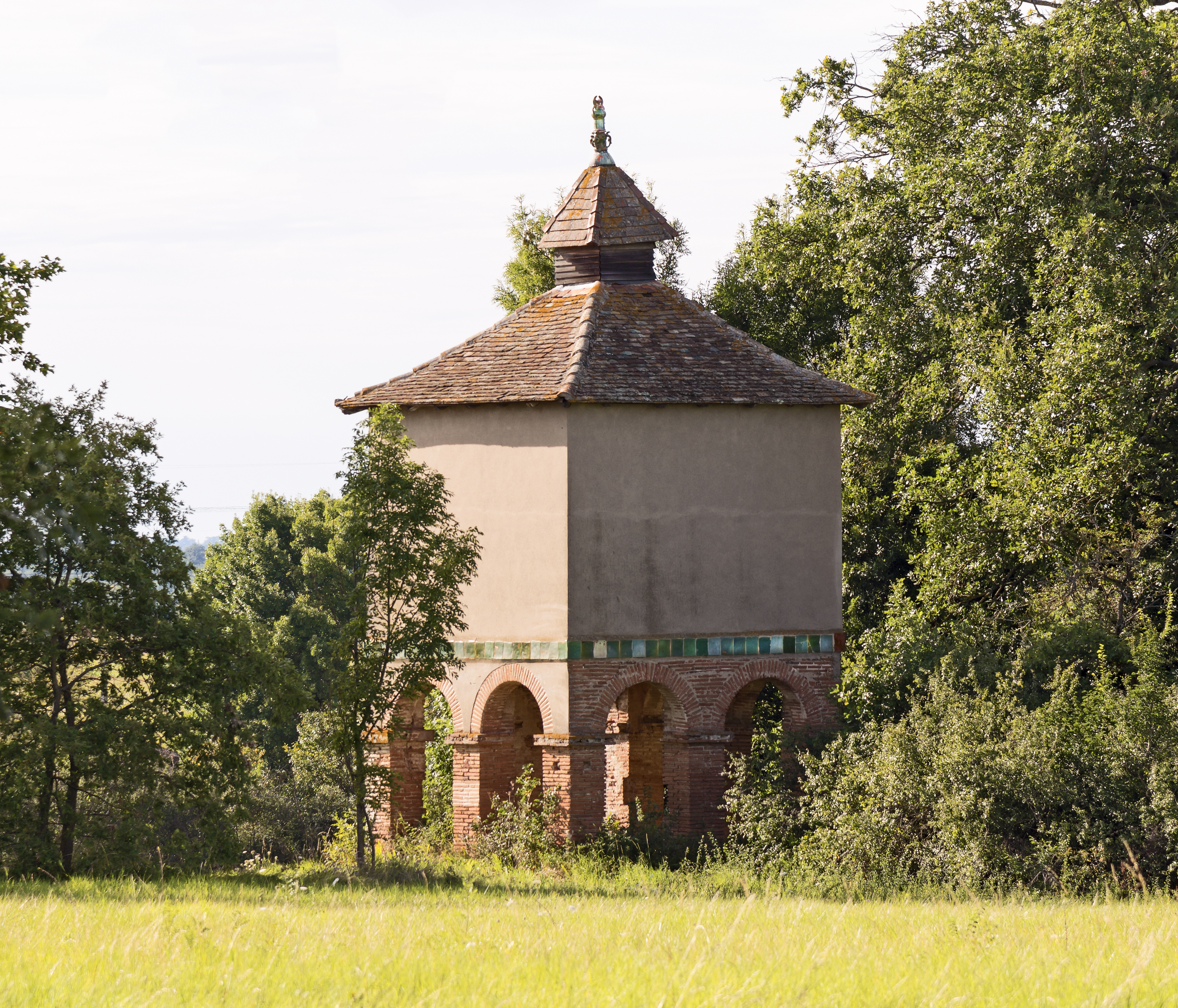
Dovecote.

== See also ==
- Communes of the Haute-Garonne department
