= Jacques Oberti =

French politician (born 1960)

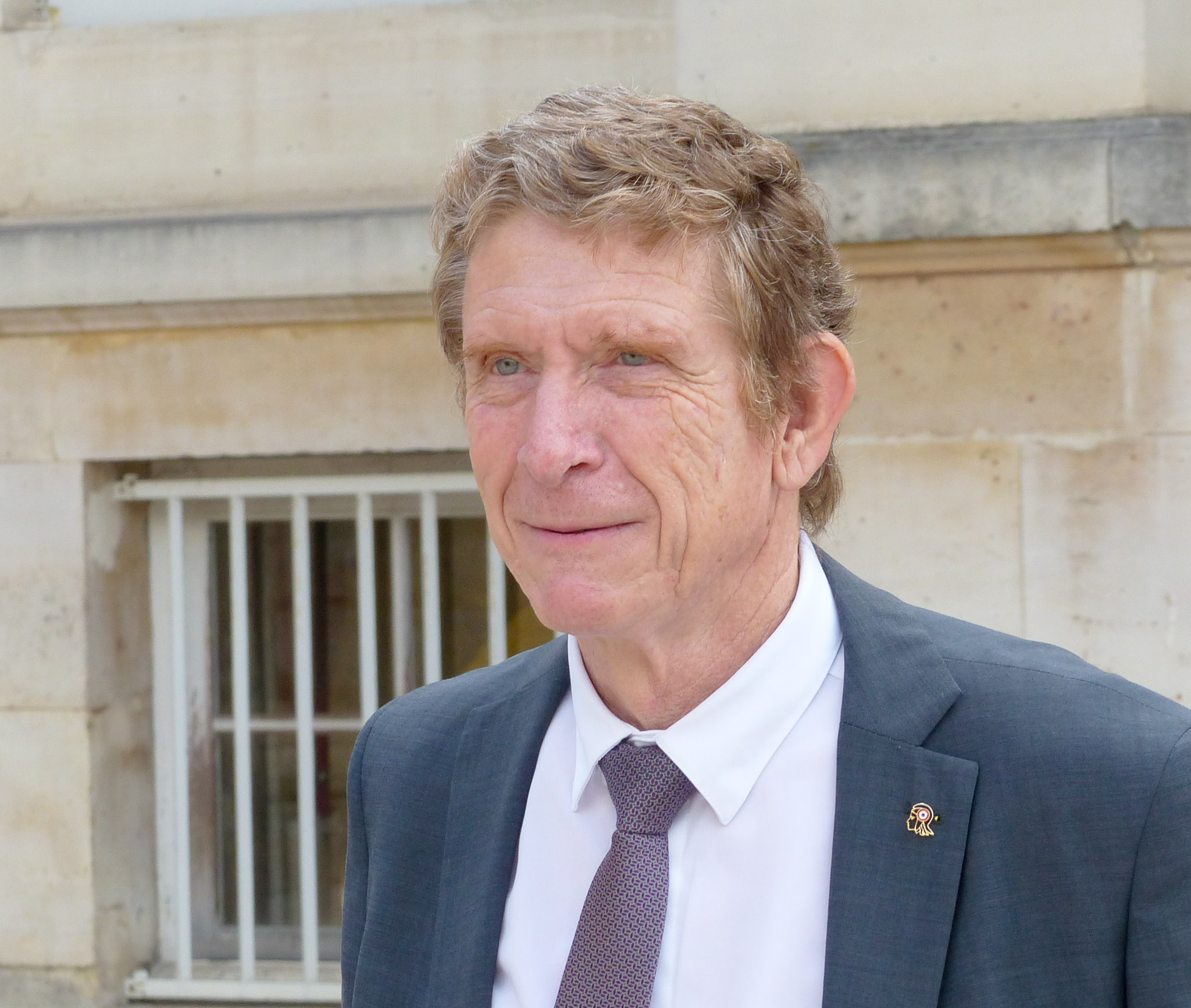
- Jacques Oberti in 2024

Member of the National Assembly for Haute-Garonne's 10th constituency
- Incumbent
- Assumed office 8 July 2024
- Preceded by: Laurent Esquenet-Goxes

Personal details
- Born: 26 November 1960 (age 65) Marseille, France
- Party: Socialist

Jacques Oberti (born 26 November 1960) is a French politician. A member of the Socialist Party, he has been a deputy to Haute-Garonne's 10th constituency since 2024.

== Biography ==
Oberti served as President of Sicoval from 2015 to 2024, and was re-elected on 10 July 2020 by the community council. In 2020, he was elected president of the Association of Mayors and Presidents of Intercommunalities of Haute-Garonnem a responsibility he continued to exercise until his election as a deputy.

As a Socialist Party candidate invested by the New Popular Front, Oberti was elected deputy for Haute-Garonne's 10th constituency with 61.07% of the vote in the early legislative elections of 2024 against the National Rally candidate Caroline Falgas-Colomina. He succeeded Laurent Esquenet-Goxes, deputy of the Minister Delegate for Territorial Collectivities and Rural Affairs, Dominique Faure, who withdrew from the three-way race at the request of Emmanuel Macron and Gabriel Attal.

== See also ==
- List of deputies of the 17th National Assembly of France
