= Julien Leonardelli =

French politician (born 1987)

Julien Leonardelli MEP
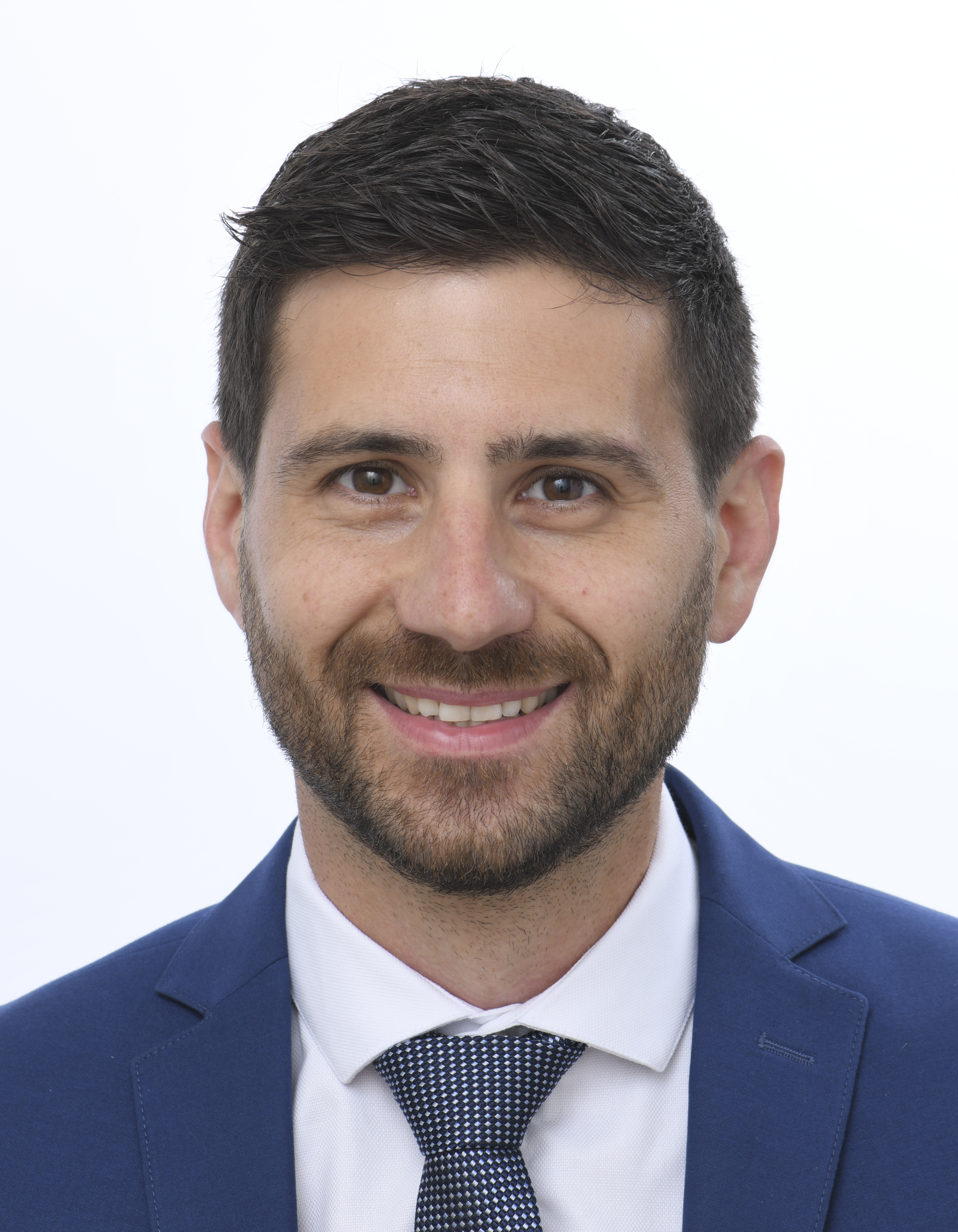

Member of the European Parliament for France
- Incumbent
- Assumed office 16 July 2024
- Parliamentary group: Patriots for Europe

Personal details
- Born: 14 July 1987 (age 38) Lavelanet, France
- Party: National Rally

Julien Leonardelli (born 14 July 1987) is a French politician.

A member of the National Rally, he has been a Member of the European Parliament since 2024, a municipal councilor in Fronton from 2020 to 2024, and a regional councilor in Occitanie since 2016.

== Biography ==
Julien Leonardelli was born on 14 July 1987 in Lavelanet, Ariège. He grew up between Ariège, Castelsarrasin, and Perpignan, then moved to Fronton in 2012. He works as a sales representative.

He joined the National Rally in Perpignan in 2005, on his 18th birthday, alongside Louis Aliot.

Julien Leonardelli was elected in the second round of the 2015 regional elections in Languedoc-Roussillon-Midi-Pyrénées as a regional councilor for Occitanie within the National Rally group, and was re-elected in 2021.

In 2013, he was appointed departmental delegate of the National Rally for the Haute-Garonne department, representing the National Rally at the departmental level.

In 2017, he stood as a candidate in the 2017 legislative elections in the fifth constituency of Haute-Garonne, where he came second in the first round with 16.67% of the vote, behind La République en Marche candidate Jean-François Portarrieu. He was defeated in the second round with 32.40% of the vote.

In 2020, Julien Leonardelli ran in the municipal elections in Fronton. He was defeated in the first round by the incumbent mayor, Hugo Cavagnac, who won 77.27% of the vote. His list came in second with 13.19% of the vote and won two seats: himself and Nicole Izard.

In 2021, Julien Leonardelli ran alongside Nicole Izard in the 2021 departmental elections in Haute-Garonne in the canton of Villemur-sur-Tarn. They were eliminated in the first round.

In 2022, he stood as a candidate in the 2022 legislative elections in Haute-Garonne in the fifth constituency of Haute-Garonne. His deputy was Nicole Izard. They were eliminated in the first round with 24.64% of the vote.

In 2024, he was ranked 27th on the National Rally list for the European elections, led by Jordan Bardella. Also in 2024, he was defeated in the legislative elections in the 5th constituency of Haute-Garonne by Jean-François Portarrieu, the outgoing Horizons MP. On September 16, 2024, he was appointed regional delegate of the National Rally for the Occitanie region.

In the European Parliament, Julien Leonardelli sits with the “Patriots for Europe” group. He is a member of the Committee on Transport and Tourism (TRAN) and a substitute member of the Committee on Regional Development (REGI). He also participates in several delegations, notably those for relations with the Mashreq countries and the Parliamentary Assembly of the Union for the Mediterranean.

== Controversies ==
In 2018, Julien Leonardelli supported a member of the far-right association SDF-Solidarité des Français (Homeless-Solidarity with the French), which carried out a food distribution for the homeless in Toulouse. This association was deemed xenophobic and racist, as Muslim and Jewish homeless were excluded from the distribution. It was subsequently banned by the Council of State.

== See also ==
- List of members of the European Parliament (2024–2029)
