= Haute-Garonne =

Department of France in Occitanie

Haute-Garonne Nauta Garona (Occitan)
- Department
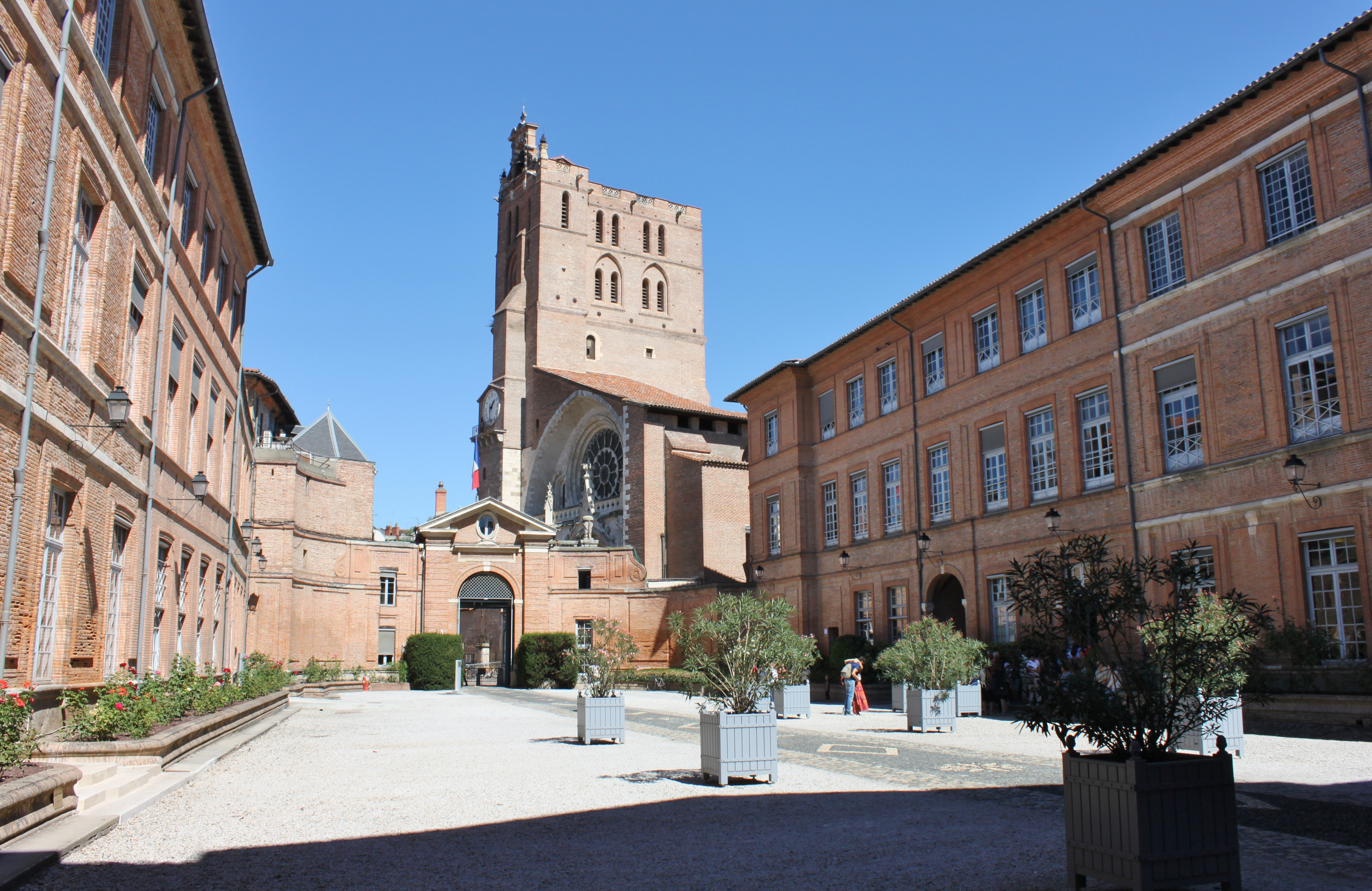
- Prefecture building in Toulouse, with the city's cathedral in the background

- Flag Coat of arms

- Location of Haute-Garonne in France
- Coordinates: 43°25′N 1°30′E
- Country: France
- Region: Occitanie
- Prefecture: Toulouse
- Subprefectures: Saint-Gaudens; Muret

Government
  - President of the Departmental Council: Sébastien Vincini (PS)

Area^{1}
  - Total: 6,309 km^{2} (2,436 sq mi)

Population (2023)
  - Total: 1,471,468
  - Rank: 13th
  - Density: 233.2/km^{2} (604.1/sq mi)
- Time zone: UTC+1 (CET)
  - Summer (DST): UTC+2 (CEST)
- Department number: 31
- Arrondissements: 3
- Cantons: 27
- Communes: 586
- ^1 French Land Register data, which exclude estuaries and lakes, ponds and glaciers larger than 1 km^{2}

Haute-Garonne (French pronunciation: [ot ɡaʁɔn]; Occitan: Nauta Garona, pronounced [ˈnawto ɡaˈɾuno]; Upper Garonne) is a department in the southwestern French region of Occitanie. Named after the river Garonne, which flows through the department. Its prefecture and main city is Toulouse, the country's fourth-largest. In 2023, it had a population of 1,471,468.

== History ==
Haute-Garonne is one of the original 83 departments created during the French Revolution on 4 March 1790. It was created from part of the former provinces of Languedoc and Guyenne/Gascony.

The department was originally larger. The reduction in its area resulted from an imperial decree dated 21 November 1808 and which established the neighbouring department of Tarn-et-Garonne, to the north. The new department took territory from five surrounding departments including Haute-Garonne. The districts lost to Tarn-et-Garonne in 1808 were those of Montech and Castelsarrasin.

== Geography ==
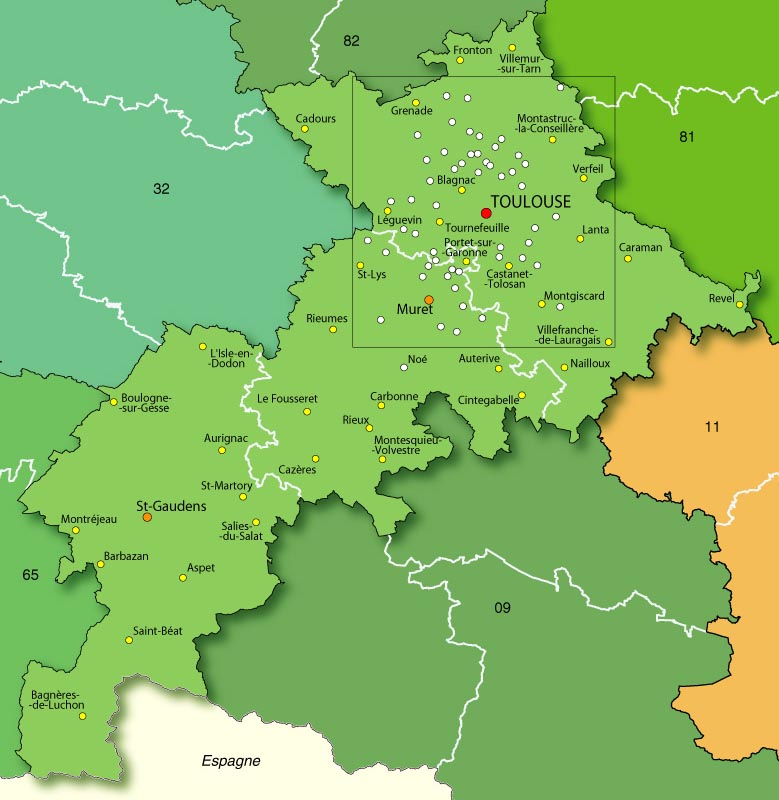
Map of Haute-Garonne with its main cities and towns

Haute-Garonne is part of the current region of Occitanie and is surrounded by the departments of Hautes-Pyrénées, Gers, Tarn-et-Garonne, Tarn, Aude, and Ariège. It also borders Spain in the south (province of Lleida and province of Huesca). According to the Köppen climate classification, the department has a mix of humid subtropical, oceanic, subarctic, and polar climates.

The department is crossed by the upper course of the Garonne river (hence the name) for nearly 200 kilometers (120 mi). The borders of the department follow the river. The Garonne enters France from Spain at the town of Fos, and goes through Toulouse and leaves the department. The extreme south of the department lies in the Pyrenees mountain range and is very mountainous. The highest elevation is the Peak of Perdiguère, at 3,222 meters (10,571 feet) above sea level.

== Demographics ==
The inhabitants of the department are called Haut-Garonnais in French. The greatest population concentration is around Toulouse, in the north, while the southern area of the department is sparsely populated. Overall the department had a population of 1.47 million as of 2023, with 55% of the population under the age of 40, and 16% between the ages of 20 and 29, and only 45% of the population is over the age 40. This youthful demographic is due in part to Toulouse being a major university town. The department has also seen significant migration from other parts of the country.

Historical population

Year	Pop.	±% p.a.
1801	339,574	—
1821	391,118	+0.71%
1831	427,856	+0.90%
1841	468,153	+0.90%
1851	481,610	+0.28%
1861	484,081	+0.05%
1872	479,362	−0.09%
1881	478,009	−0.03%
1891	472,383	−0.12%
1901	448,481	−0.52%
1911	432,126	−0.37%
1921	424,582	−0.18%
1931	441,799	+0.40%

Year	Pop.	±% p.a.
1936	458,647	+0.75%
1946	512,260	+1.11%
1954	525,669	+0.32%
1962	594,633	+1.55%
1968	690,712	+2.53%
1975	777,431	+1.70%
1982	824,501	+0.84%
1990	925,962	+1.46%
1999	1,046,338	+1.37%
2007	1,202,920	+1.76%
2012	1,279,349	+1.24%
2017	1,362,672	+1.27%
2023	1,471,468	+1.29%

=== Principal towns ===
The most populous commune is Toulouse, the prefecture. As of 2023, there were ten communes with more than 15,000 inhabitants:

Commune	Population (2023)
Toulouse	514,819
Colomiers	40,882
Tournefeuille	30,168
Blagnac	27,604
Muret	26,079
Plaisance-du-Touch	21,079
Cugnaux	20,662
Balma	17,772
Castanet-Tolosan	15,317
Ramonville-Saint-Agne	15,158

== Politics ==
This department was the political base of former Prime Minister Lionel Jospin.

=== Departmental Council of Haute-Garonne ===
The Departmental Council of Haute-Garonne comprises 54 seats. In the 2015 departmental elections, the Socialist Party (PS) won 48 seats. The Republicans secured the remaining 6 seats. The President of the Departmental Council has been Georges Méric (PS) since 2015.

Party		Seats
•	Socialist Party	48
	The Republicans	6

=== Members of the National Assembly ===
Haute-Garonne elected the following members of the National Assembly during the 2017 legislative election:

Constituency	Member	Party
Haute-Garonne's 1st constituency	Hadrien Clouet	La France Insoumise
Haute-Garonne's 2nd constituency	Anne Stambach-Terrenoir	La France Insoumise
Haute-Garonne's 3rd constituency	Corinne Vignon	Renaissance
Haute-Garonne's 4th constituency	François Piquemal	La France Insoumise
Haute-Garonne's 5th constituency	Jean-François Portarrieu	Renaissance
Haute-Garonne's 6th constituency	Arnaud Simion	Socialist Party
Haute-Garonne's 7th constituency	Christophe Bex	La France Insoumise
Haute-Garonne's 8th constituency	Joël Aviragnet	Socialist Party
Haute-Garonne's 9th constituency	Christine Arrighi	The Ecologists
Haute-Garonne's 10th constituency	Jacques Oberti	Socialist Party

== Transport ==
=== Air ===
Haute-Garonne is served by Toulouse–Blagnac Airport. As of March 2024, the airport featured flights to 84 destinations, mostly in Europe and Northern Africa with a few additional seasonal long-haul connections. The airport served 7.8 million passengers in 2024.

== Tourism ==
=== Main sights ===
Haute-Garonne's main sights include:

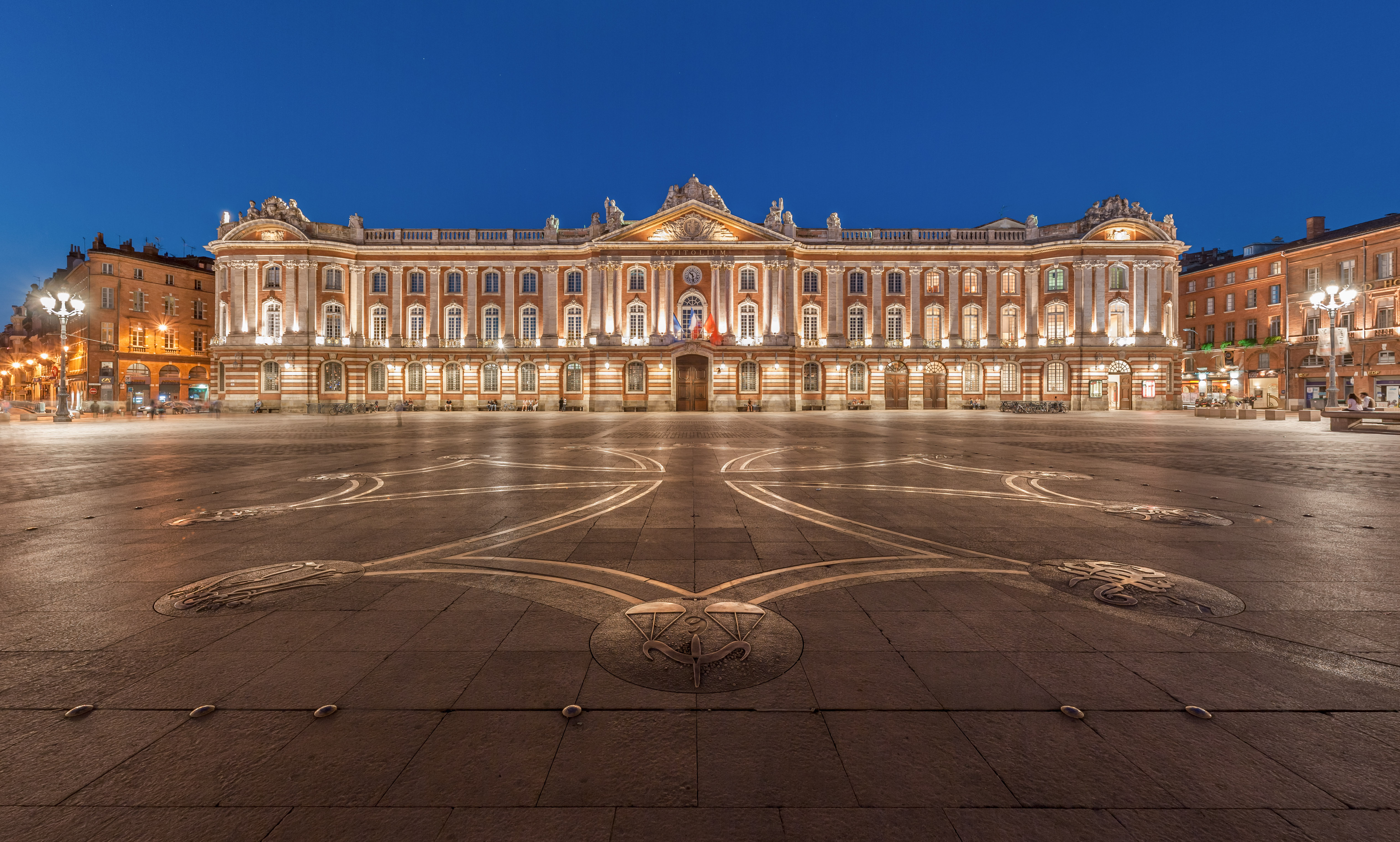
The Capitole de Toulouse at night

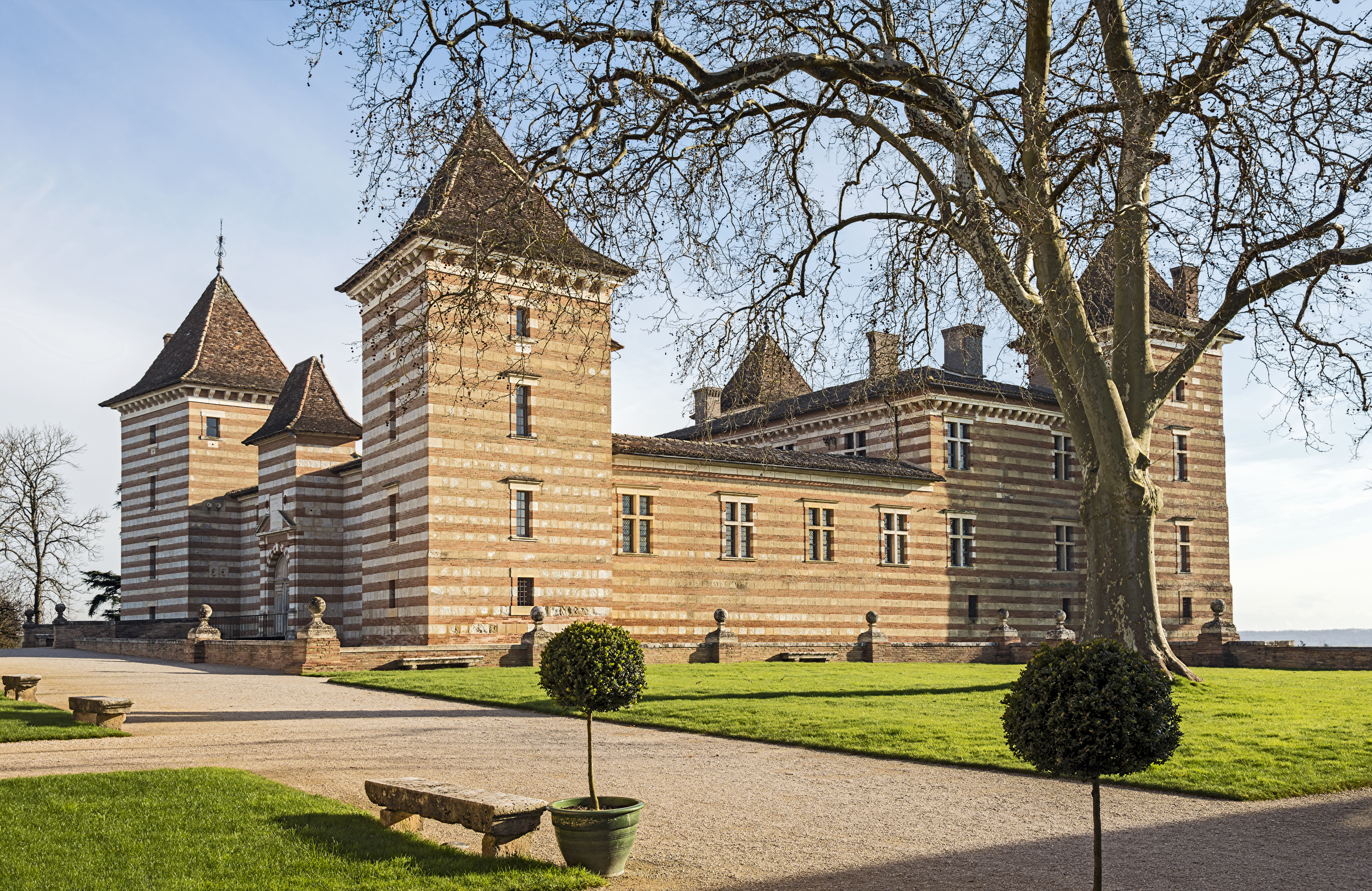
Château de Laréole

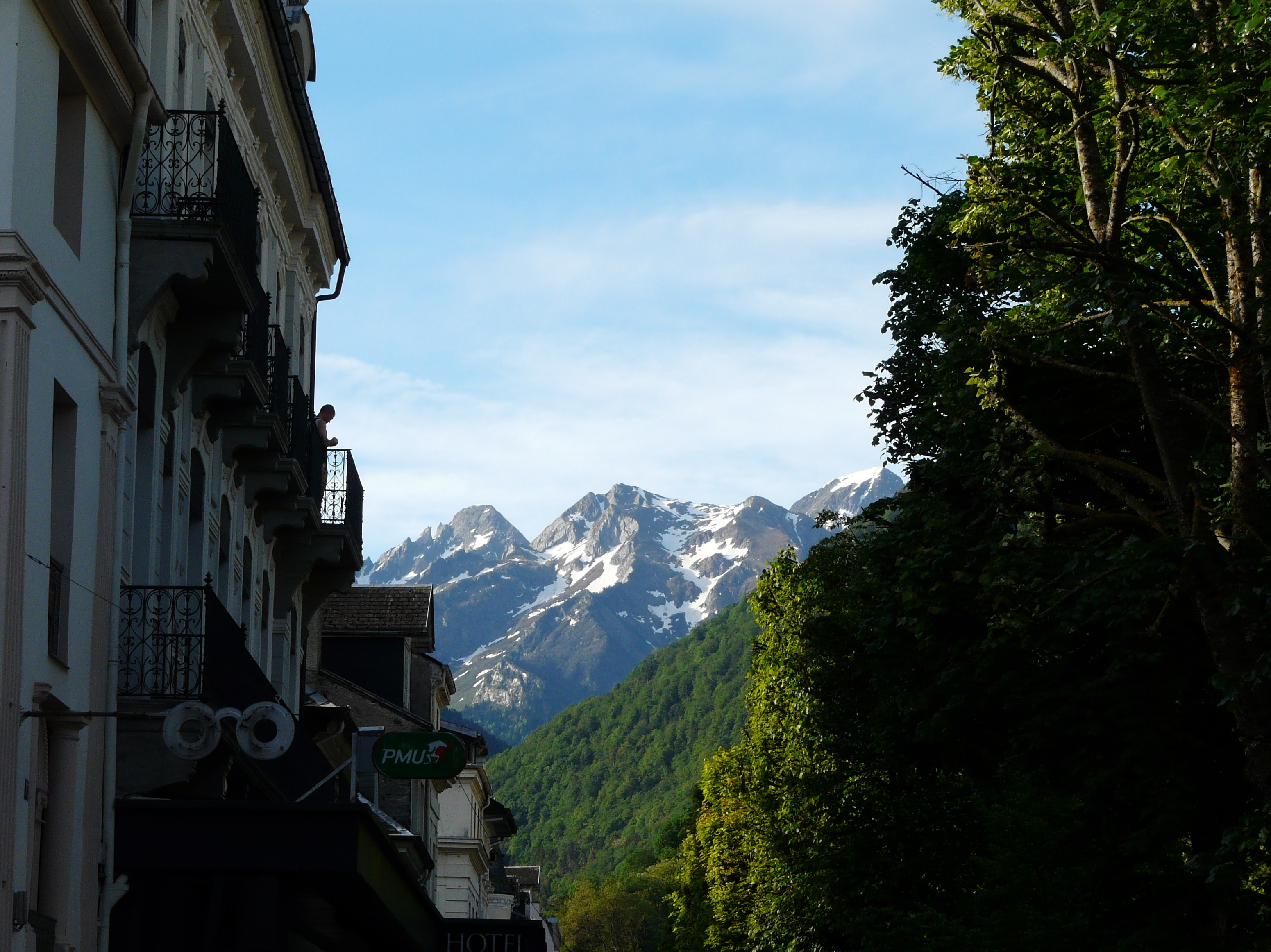
The Pyrenees mountain range seen from Bagnères-de-Luchon

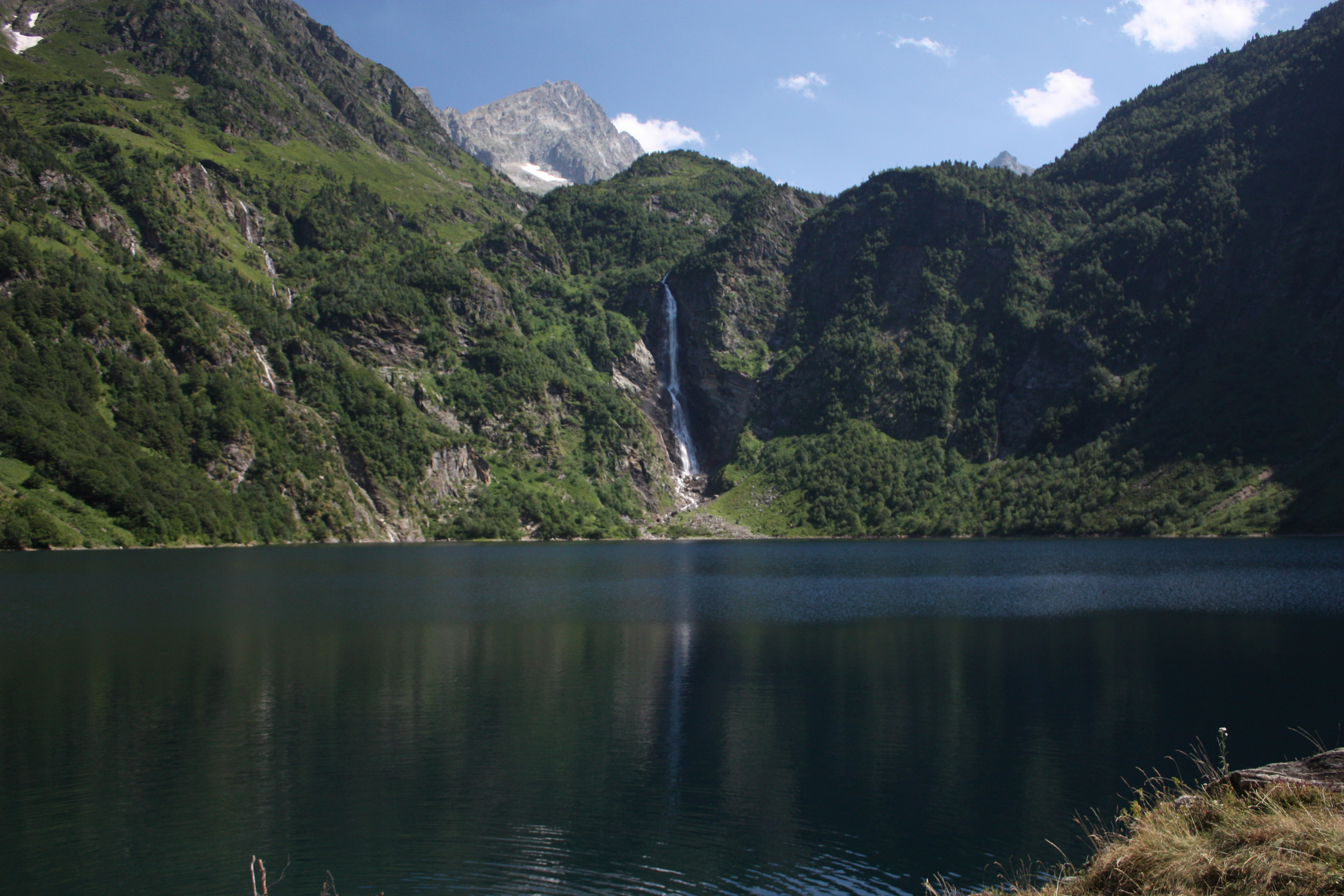
Lac d'Oô

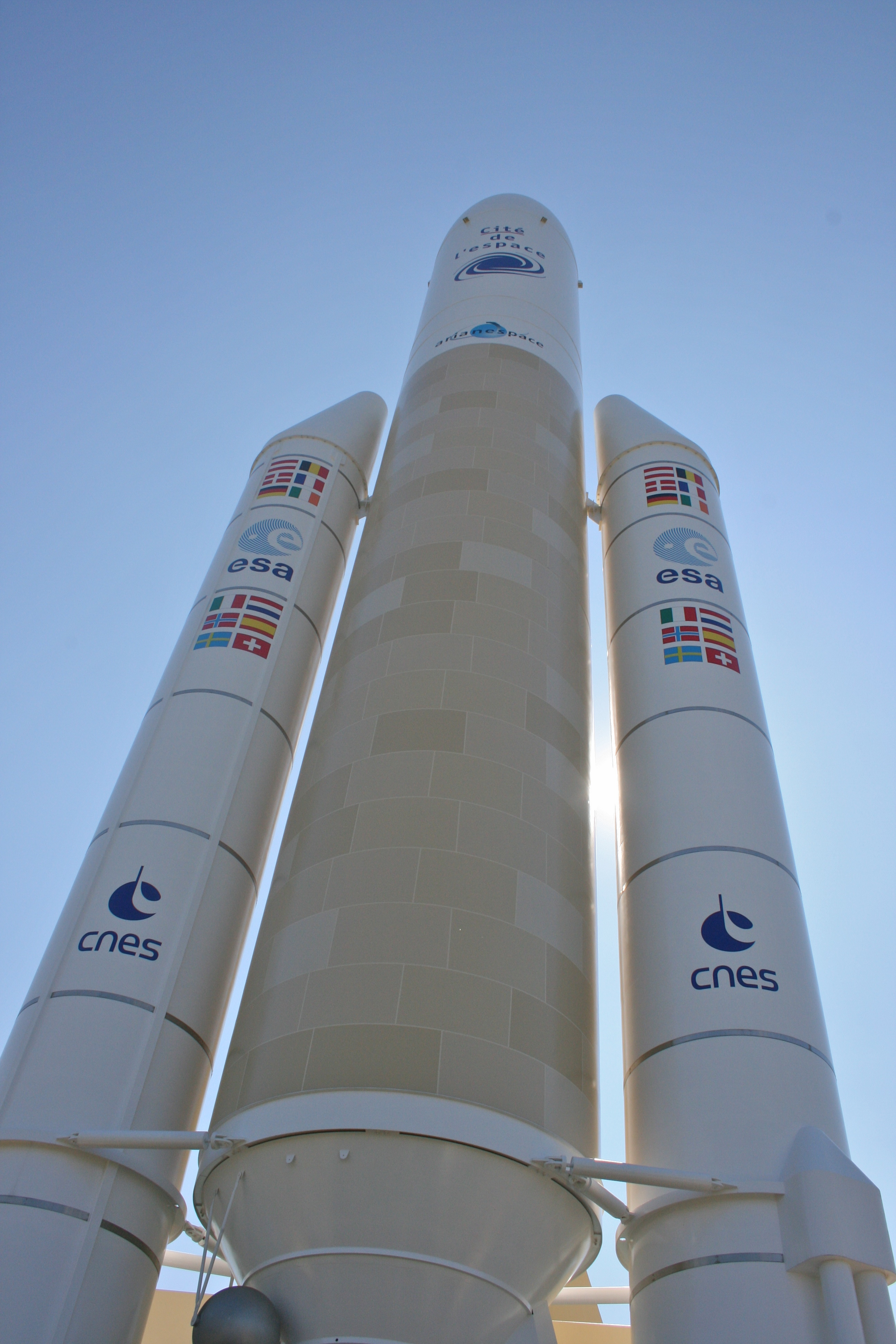
Cité de l'espace

=== Winter sports ===
The department has four ski resorts:

- Peyragudes (1600 m -2450 m), 55 km of slopes
- Luchon-Superbagnères (1440 m - 2260 m), 30 km of slopes
- Le Mourtis (1380 m - 1816 m), 22 km of slopes
- Bourg-d'Oueil (1350 m - 1500 m)

== See also ==
- Cantons of the Haute-Garonne department
- Communes of the Haute-Garonne department
- Arrondissements of the Haute-Garonne department
