= Dominique Faure =

French politician

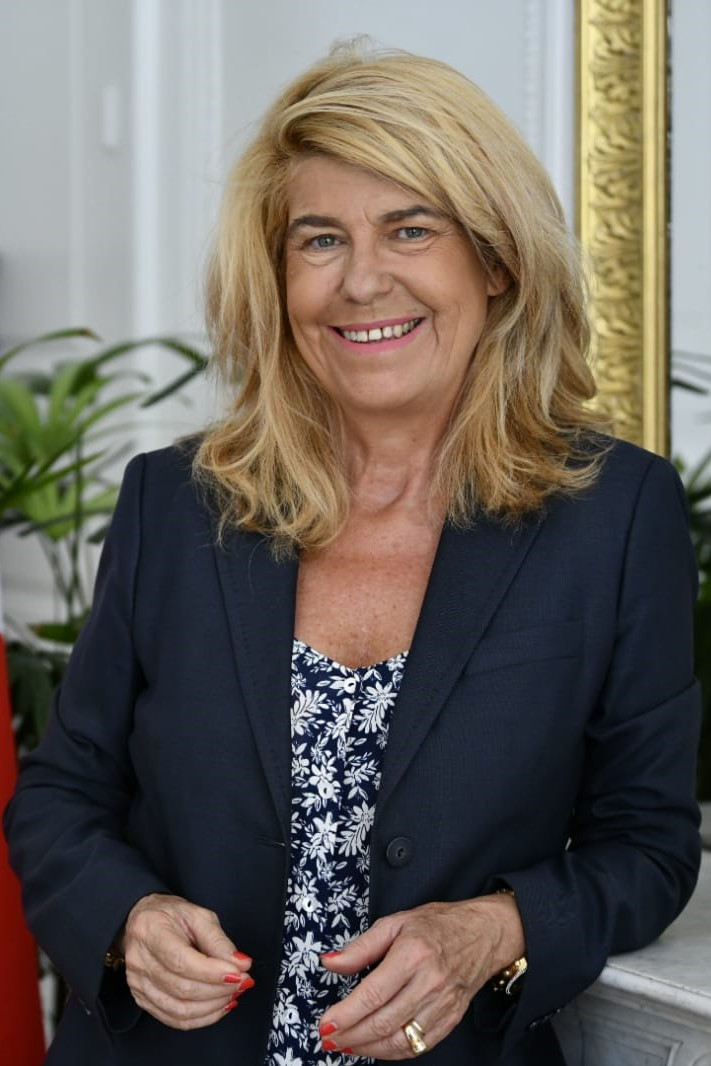
- Official portrait of Dominique Faire, then Secretary of State for Rural Affairs

Minister Delegate for Territorial Collectivities and Rural Affairs
- In office 28 November 2022 – 21 September 2024
- President: Emmanuel Macron
- Prime Minister: Élisabeth Borne; Gabriel Attal
- Preceded by: Caroline Cayeux (Territorial Collectivities); Herself (Rural Affairs, as Secretary of State)
- Succeeded by: Françoise Gatel (Rural Affairs)

Secretary of State for Rural Affairs
- In office 4 July 2022 – 28 November 2022
- President: Emmanuel Macron
- Prime Minister: Élisabeth Borne
- Preceded by: Joël Giraud
- Succeeded by: Herself (as Minister Delegate)

Member of the National Assembly for Haute-Garonne's 10th constituency
- In office 22 June 2022 – 4 August 2022
- Preceded by: Sébastien Nadot
- Succeeded by: Laurent Esquenet-Goxes

Mayor of Saint-Orens-de-Gameville
- In office 1 April 2014 – 7 July 2022
- Preceded by: Christian Sempé
- Succeeded by: Serge Jop

Personal details
- Born: 28 August 1959 (age 67) Carcassonne, France
- Party: Renaissance (2017–present)
- Other political affiliations: Radical Party (2012–2017, 2021–present)
- Education: INSA Lyon; HEC Paris (MBA)

Dominique Faure (born 28 August 1959) is a French politician of Renaissance (RE). She served as Secretary of State for Rural Affairs from July to November 2022 in the Borne government, and as Minister Delegate for Territorial Collectivities and Rural Affairs from November 2022 to September 2024 in the Borne and Attal governments. She represented Haute-Garonne's 10th constituency in the National Assembly from June to August 2022.

== Early life and career ==
Faure holds an engineering degree from INSA de Lyon and an MBA from HEC Paris.

Following graduation, Faure worked in major companies – IBM, Motorola, SFR, Veolia – and ran a human resources consulting firm before entering politics in the 2012 legislative elections. Together with her husband, she also owns a hotel.

== Political career ==
From 2014 to 2022, Faure served as mayor of Saint-Orens-de-Gameville.

== Personal life ==
Faure is married and has three children.
