= Christine Arrighi =

French politician (born 1959)

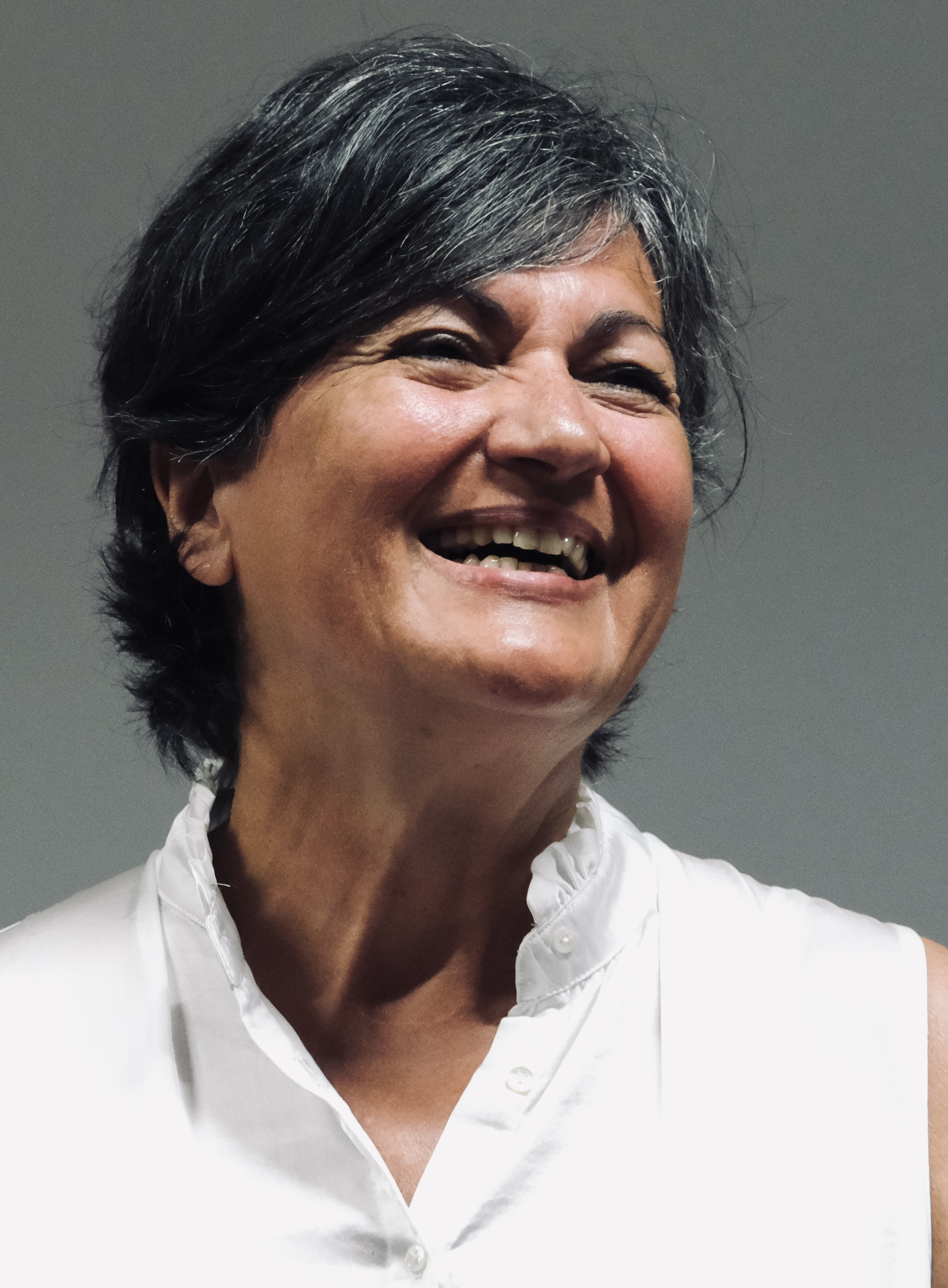
- Christine Arrighi

Member of the National Assembly for Haute-Garonne's 9th constituency
- Incumbent
- Assumed office 20 June 2022
- Preceded by: Sandrine Mörch

Personal details
- Born: 19 September 1959 (age 66) Lannemezan, Hautes-Pyrénées, France
- Party: EELV
- Other political affiliations: NUPES

Christine Arrighi (born 19 September 1959) is a French politician from EELV (NUPES). She became the Member of Parliament for Haute-Garonne's 9th constituency in the 2022 French legislative election.

== See also ==
- List of deputies of the 16th National Assembly of France
