= Jean-Luc Lagleize =

French politician (born 1958)

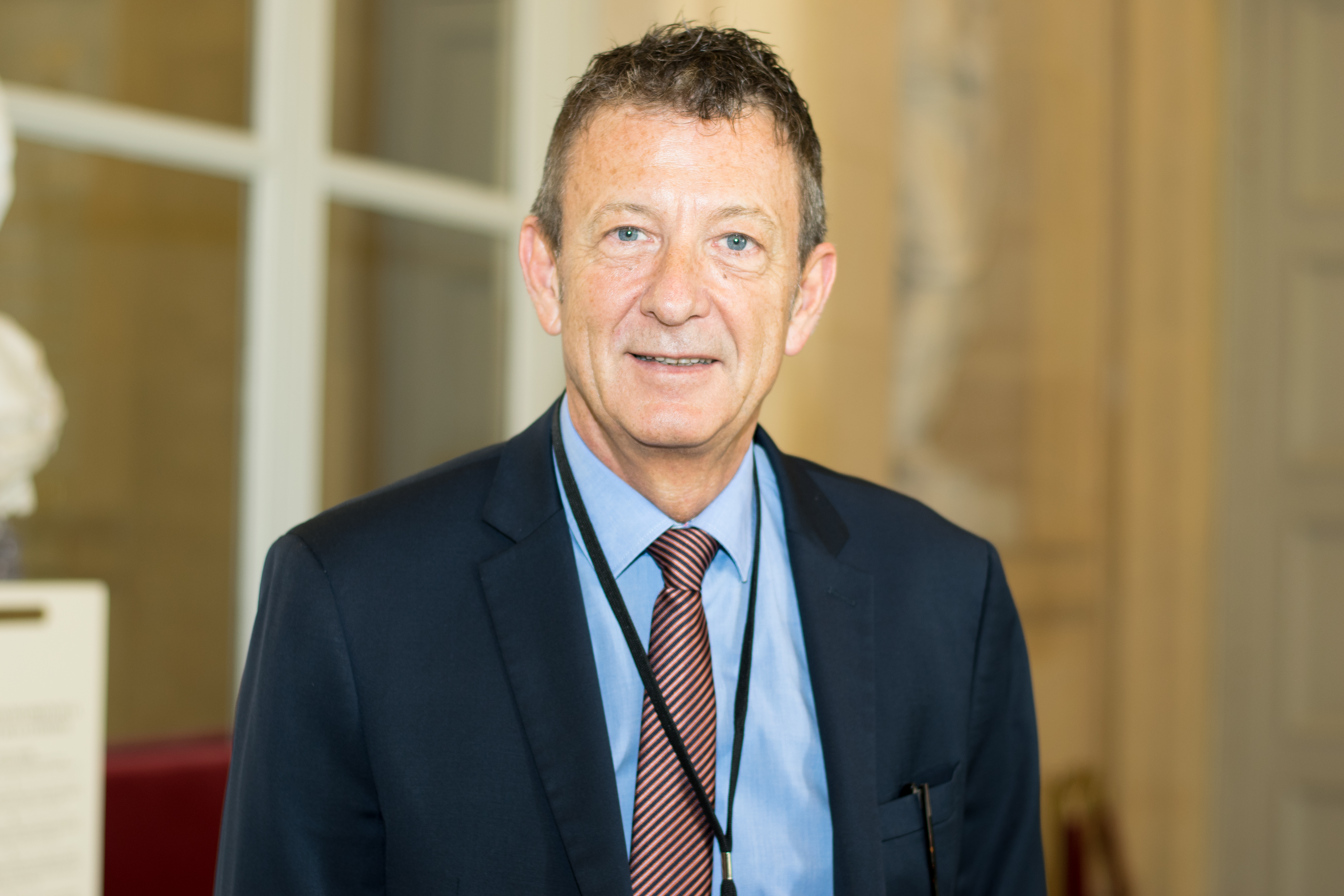

Jean-Luc Lagleize (born 9 September 1958) is a French politician representing the Democratic Movement. He was elected to the French National Assembly on 18 June 2017, representing Haute-Garonne's 2nd constituency.

Lagleize is a computer scientist and worked in commercial and management positions for Thales Group and Capgemini. He served as a councillor for Muret from 1989 to 1995, and then for Toulouse from 2008 to 2014.

He lost his seat in the 2022 French legislative election to Anne Stambach-Terrenoir from La France Insoumise.
