= Anne Stambach-Terrenoir =

French politician

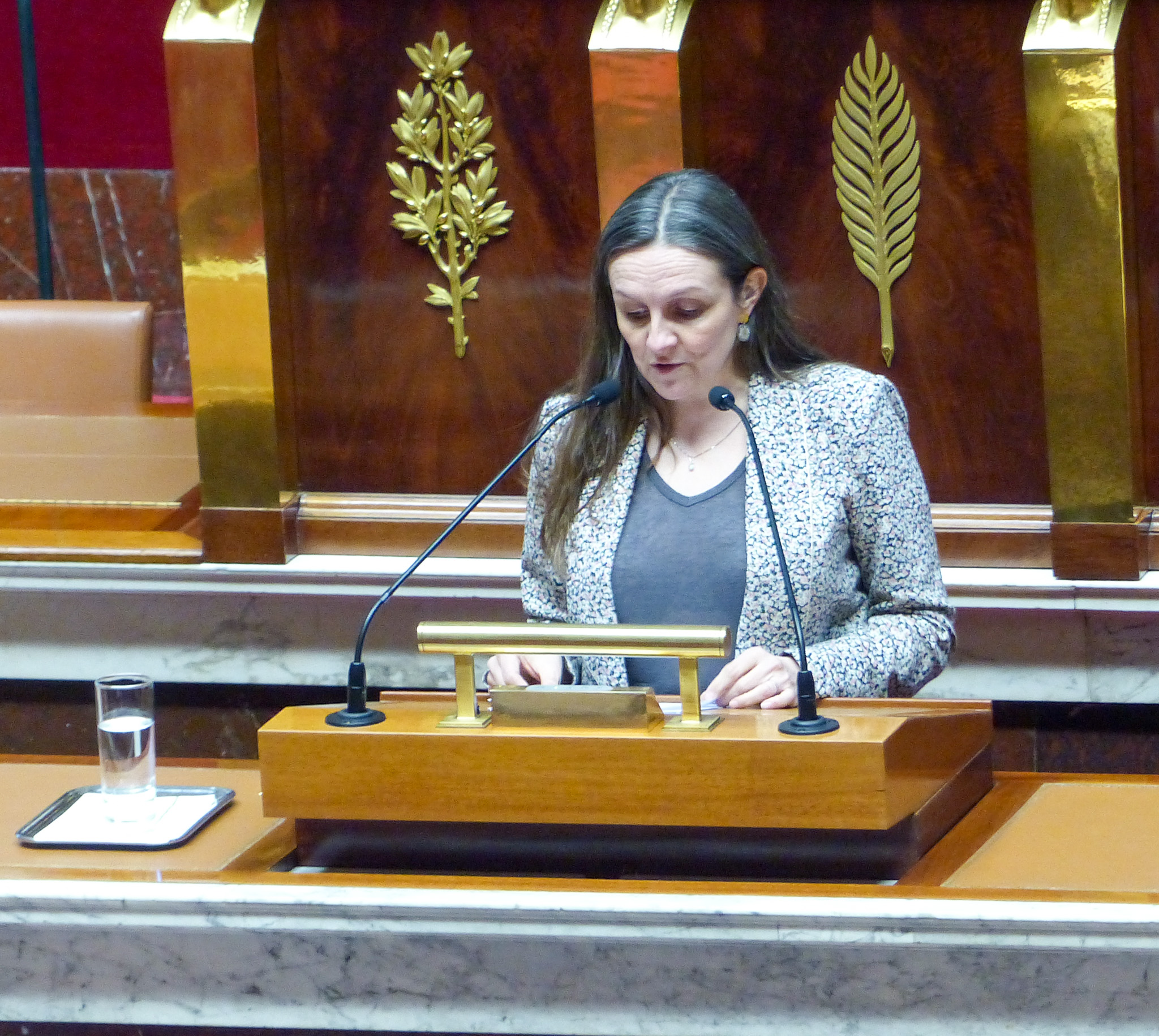
- Anne Stambach-Terrenoir in the National Assembly in 2026

Member of the National Assembly
- Incumbent
- Assumed office 22 June 2022
- Preceded by: Jean-Luc Lagleize
- Constituency: Haute-Garonne's 2nd constituency

Personal details
- Born: 23 June 1980 (age 45) Amiens, France
- Citizenship: France
- Party: La France Insoumise
- Education: University of Toulouse II-Le Mirail
- Occupation: Piano teacher

Anne Stambach-Terrenoir (born 23 June 1980) is a French politician from La France Insoumise who has represented Haute-Garonne's 2nd constituency in the National Assembly since 2022.

== Biography ==
Anne Stambach-Terrenoir was born in 1980 in Amiens. She studied musicology at the University of Toulouse II - Le Mirail. She then became a piano teacher and worked for 15 years at a music school.

She ran for parliament in the 2017 legislative election for La France insoumise, in Haute-Garonne's 2nd constituency. She was defeated in the second round by Jean-Luc Lagleize, receiving 45% of the votes in the second round.

After the 2019 european election, she became the assistant of MEP Manuel Bompard, until 2022. She was the coordinator of the working group who wrote the official platform on animal rights for Jean-Luc Mélenchon's presidential campaign in 2022.

She ran for parliament again in the 2022 legislative election and was elected on 22 June 2022 against incumbent Jean-Luc Lagleize. She was re-elected in 2024 following the dissolution of the French parliament by Emmanuel Macron.

== Electoral Results ==
=== Legislative Elections ===
Year	Party/Coalition	Constituency	1st round			2nd round			Elected
Year	Party/Coalition	Constituency	Votes	%	Rank	Votes	%	Rank	Elected
2017	LFI	Haute-Garonne 2	7,502	15.45	2nd	18,113	44.51	2nd	No
2022	LFI (NUPES)	Haute-Garonne 2	20,570	37.25	1st	26,895	52.90	1st	Yes
2024	LFI (NFP)	Haute-Garonne 2	30,402	40.53	1st	33,063	44,41	1st	Yes
