= Jean-François Portarrieu =

French politician

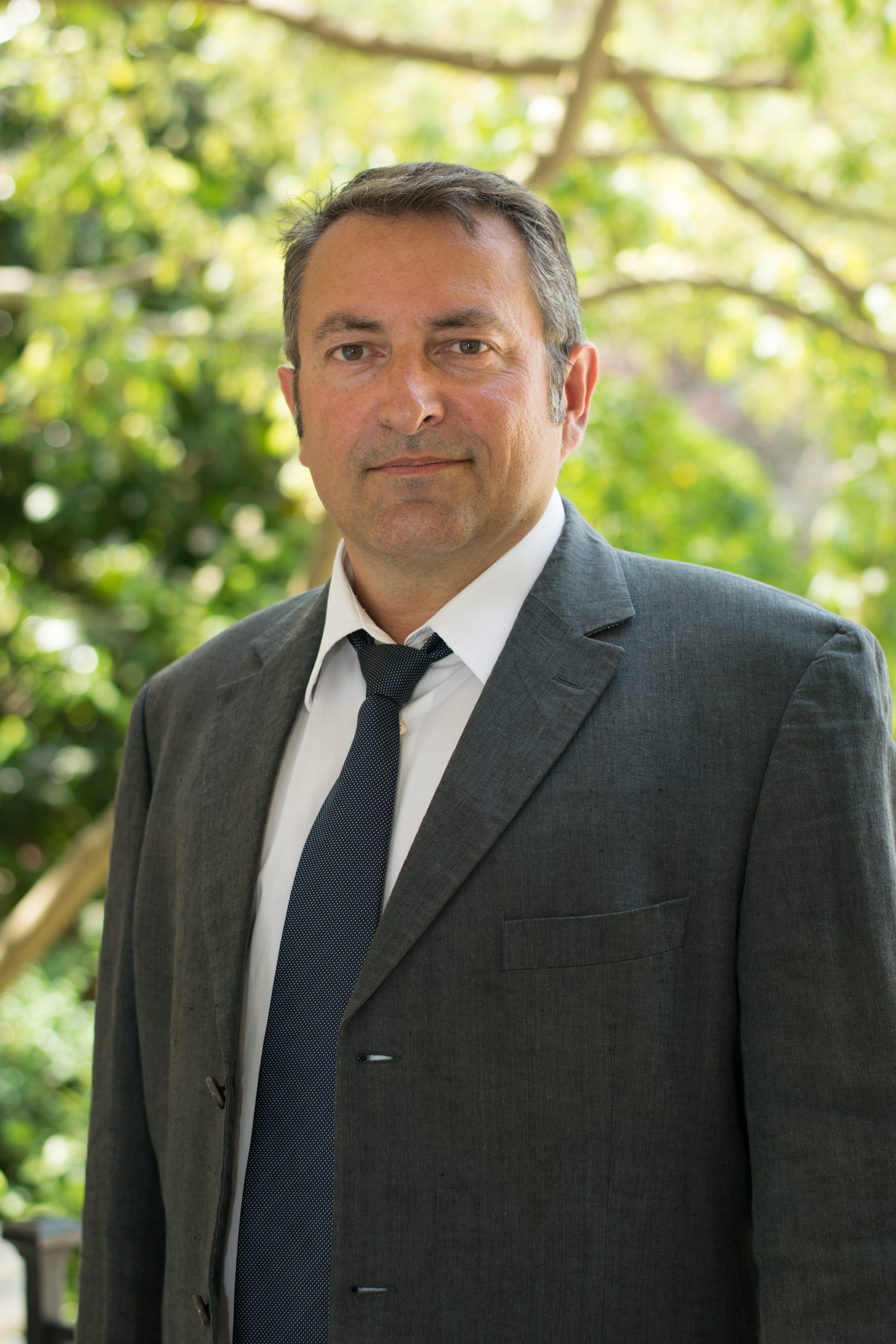
Jean-François Portarrieu (2017)

Jean-François Portarrieu is a French politician representing Renaissance (RE). He was elected to the French National Assembly on 18 June 2017, representing Haute-Garonne's 5th constituency. He was reelected in June 2022 by a narrow margin in the second round over Sylvie Edpagnolle of La France Insoumise.

== See also ==
- 2017 French legislative election
