= Françoise de Veyrinas =

French politician (1943–2008)

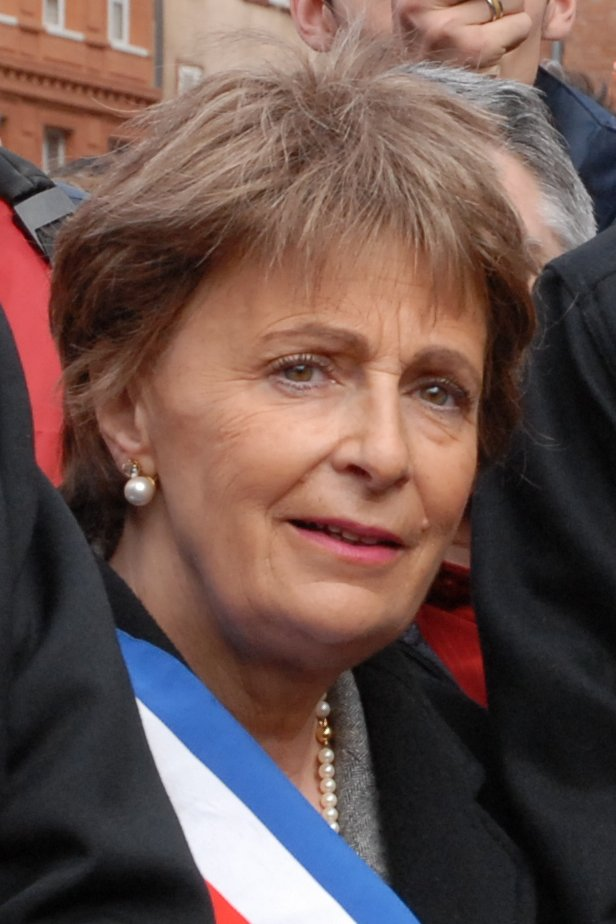
- Françoise de Veyrinas in 2007

Member of the National Assembly for Haute-Garonne's 6th constituency
- In office 2 April 1993 – 18 June 1995
- Preceded by: Hélène Mignon
- Succeeded by: Alain Barrès

Personal details
- Born: Françoise Gardey de Soos; 4 September 1943 Alzonne, Aude, France
- Died: 16 August 2008 (aged 64) Montréal, Aude, France
- Spouse: François Hébrard de Veyrinas

Françoise de Veyrinas (born Gardey de Soos; 4 September 1943 – 16 August 2008) was a French politician and Member of the European Parliament.

== Biography ==
Elected to Toulouse representing the UDF and the UMP uninterrupted since 1983, she was première adjointe ((in French) "First Assistant") to her town from 1995 until 2008 and vice-president of the Communauté d'agglomération du Grand Toulouse ((in French) loosely, "Community of the Conurbation of Greater Toulouse"). She sat on the Regional Mid-Pyrénées Council and then the General Council of Haute-Garonne. She was also a Member of the European Parliament after François Bayrou resigned. A specialist in social issues, she was briefly (May–November 1995) Secrétaire d'État aux Quartiers en difficulté ((in French) "Secretary of State for Quarters in Difficulty") in the first Juppé government.

Voted a member of the UDF-CDS in 1993, she then failed to be elected in the legislative elections of 2002 and 2007. In 2008, though re-elected city councillor on the ticket of the outgoing mayor Jean-Luc Moudenc, she ended up in opposition to the new Socialist mayor, Pierre Cohen.

From May 2003 until her death, de Veyrinas was president of the Conseil national des missions locales ((in French) "National Council of Local Missions").

She died on 16 August 2008 at age 64, after a battle with cancer. She received many tributes and mayor Pierre Cohen came to her funeral.

== Citizenship ==
- Regional delegate to the Women of Midi-Pyrénées (1979–1982 and 1986–1989)
- Head of Maintenance at home elderly in Haute-Garonne (1983–1986)
- Chargée de mission for the Minister of Social Affairs, Health and City, Simone Veil (1994)

== Political offices ==
- Regional Council of Midi-Pyrénées (1986–1992)
- General Counsel of the Canton of Toulouse XII (1992–2001)
- Member for Haute-Garonne's 6th constituency from 1993 to 1995
- Secretary of State for areas, with the Minister for Integration and the Fight against Exclusion in Alain Juppé's government in 1995
- MEP 2002 to 2004
- City Council of Toulouse in 1983 to 2008
- Deputy Mayor of Toulouse from 1995 to 2008 (mandates of Dominique Baudis, Philippe Douste-Blazy and Jean-Luc Moudenc)

== Honours ==
- Officer of the Legion of Honour, awarded Friday 9 February 2007
- Officer of the Ordre national du Mérite, awarded 31 December 2005
