= Haute-Garonne's 1st constituency =

Constituency of the National Assembly of France

1st constituency of Haute-Garonne
- inline Constituency of the National Assembly of France

- Location of constituency in Department

- Haute-Garonne in France
- Deputy: Hadrien Clouet; LFI
- Department: Haute-Garonne
- Cantons: Toulouse-1, Toulouse-4, Toulouse-5, Toulouse-7

The 1st constituency of the Haute-Garonne is a French legislative constituency in the Haute-Garonne département.

== Deputies ==
Election	Member	Party	Notes
1958	Pierre Baudis	MRP	
1962	Pierre Baudis	MRP	
1967	André Rousselet	FGDS	
1968	Pierre Baudis	RI	
1973	Pierre Baudis	RI	
1978	Gérard Bapt	PS	Deputy for Haute-Garonne's 2nd constituency 1988-93, 1997-2017
1981	Alain Savary	PS	
1986	Proportional representation - no election by constituency		
1988	Dominique Baudis	UDF	
1993	Dominique Baudis	UDF	
1997	Dominique Baudis	UDF	Appointed president of CSA.
2001	Philippe Douste-Blazy	UDF	Substitute for Dominique Baudis.
2002	Philippe Douste-Blazy	UMP	Appointed Minister of Social Affairs and Health.
2004	Bernadette Païx	UMP	Substitute for Philippe Douste-Blazy.
2007	Catherine Lemorton	PS	
2012	Catherine Lemorton	PS	
2017	Pierre Cabaré	LREM	
2022	Hadrien Clouet	LFI	
2024	Hadrien Clouet	LFI	

== Election results ==
=== 2024 ===
Candidate	Party	Alliance	First round			Second round		
Candidate	Party	Alliance	Votes	%	+/–	Votes	%	+/–
Hadrien Clouet	LFI	NFP	26,985	45.52	+5.73	29,059	49.97	-4.15
Elodie Hobet	REN	Ensemble	16,063	27.10	-0.95	15,842	27.24	-18.64
Lola Chambelin	RN		12,636	21.32	+11.57	13,253	22.79	new
Evelyne Boujat	REG		1,601	2.70	-0.33			
Jean-Marie Trouillet	REC		1,028	1.73	-2.97			
Alexis De Berranger	DIV		574	0.97	new			
Olivier Le Penven	LO		390	0.66	-0.05			
Votes			59,277	100.00		58,154	100.00	
Valid votes			59,277	97.22	-1.41	58,154	97.37	+2.93
Blank votes			1,173	1.92	+1.01	1,131	1.89	-2.04
Null votes			522	0.86	+0.41	441	0.74	-0.89
Turnout			60,972	71.54	+18.54	59,726	70.07	+18.54
Abstentions			24,258	28.46	-18.54	25,509	29.93	-18.54
Registered voters			85,230			85,235		
Result			LFI HOLD					

=== 2022 ===
Legislative Election 2022: Haute-Garonne's 1st constituency
Party	Candidate	Votes	%	±%
LFI (NUPÉS)	Hadrien Clouet	17,468	39.79	-1.93
LREM (Ensemble)	Pierre Baudis	12,314	28.05	-5.65
RN	Cathy Marsal	4,279	9.75	+1.98
PRG	Pierre Nicolas Bapt	3,128	7.13	N/A
REC	Aude Battistella	2,065	4.70	N/A
LR (UDC)	Oscar Castillo-Mendegris	1,637	3.73	−9.27
REG	Evelyne Boujat	1,330	3.03	N/A
Others	N/A	1,675		
Turnout		44,504	53.00	+2.41
2nd round result
LFI (NUPÉS)	Hadrien Clouet	22,140	54.22	+5.24
LREM (Ensemble)	Pierre Baudis	18,695	45.78	−5.24
Turnout		40,835	48.64	+5.65
LFI gain from LREM				

=== 2017 ===
Candidate	Label	First round		Second round	
Candidate	Label	Votes	%	Votes	%
Pierre Cabaré	REM	13,769	33.70	16,203	51.02
Claire Dujardin	FI	7,493	18.34	15,556	48.98
Catherine Lemorton	PS	6,109	14.95		
François Chollet	LR	5,311	13.00		
Quentin Lamotte	FN	3,174	7.77		
Xavier Bigot	ECO	2,487	6.09		
Pierre Lacaze	PCF	958	2.34		
Cécilia Spoerry	DIV	627	1.53		
Matthieu Guilhem	DIV	408	1.00		
Olivier Le Penven	EXG	234	0.57		
Pierre Serveille	ECO	214	0.52		
Nourdine Kotbi	DVG	71	0.17		
Votes		40,855	100.00	31,759	100.00
Valid votes		40,855	98.38	31,759	89.98
Blank votes		446	1.07	2,277	6.45
Null votes		227	0.55	1,260	3.57
Turnout		41,528	50.59	35,296	42.99
Abstentions		40,560	49.41	46,799	57.01
Registered voters		82,088		82,095	
Source: Ministry of the Interior

=== 2012 ===
2012 legislative election in Haute-Garonne's 1st constituency
Candidate	Party	First round		Second round	
Candidate	Party	Votes	%	Votes	%
Catherine Lemorton	PS	18,759	43.63%	25,418	64.75%
Sacha Briand	UMP	10,037	23.34%	13,837	35.25%
Bernard Schwal	FN	4,281	9.96%		
Pierre Lacaze	FG	3,872	9.01%		
Marie-Pierre Cassagne	EELV	2,790	6.49%		
Jean-Jacques Bolzan	PR	1,369	3.18%		
Michel Amorosa	PP	385	0.90%		
Marie-Colette Chaudoreille	AEI	323	0.75%		
Bettina Pichon	NPA	284	0.66%		
Henri-Pierre Colombo		229	0.53%		
Aude Garnier	DLR	210	0.49%		
Jean-Pierre Sertillange	LO	140	0.33%		
Robert Baud	MEI	138	0.32%		
Pierre Serveille		104	0.24%		
Pierre Pezzin		38	0.09%		
Hélène Porceddu		36	0.08%		
Anthony Rouja		0	0.00%		
Valid votes		42,995	98.93%	39,255	97.34%
Spoilt and null votes		466	1.07%	1,074	2.66%
Votes cast / turnout		43,461	56.86%	40,329	52.77%
Abstentions		32,978	43.14%	36,101	47.23%
Registered voters		76,439	100.00%	76,430	100.00%

=== 2007 ===
Legislative Election 2007: Haute-Garonne's 1st constituency
Party	Candidate	Votes	%	±%
NM	Jean-Luc Moudenc	15,152	37.44	
PS	Catherine Lemorton	12,758	31.53	
MoDem	Jean-Luc Forget	3,869	9.56	
LV	Pierre Labeyrie	2,199	5.43	
Far left	Sylvie Lorthois	2,115	5.23	
FN	Thierry Viallon	1,304	3.22	
Far left	Fréderic Borras	1,275	3.15	
Others	N/A	1,793		
Turnout		40,914	58.10	
2nd round result
PS	Catherine Lemorton	21,824	54.55	
NM	Jean-Luc Moudenc	18,186	45.45	
Turnout		40,808	57.95	
PS gain from UMP				

=== 2002 ===
Legislative Election 2002: Haute-Garonne's 1st constituency
Party	Candidate	Votes	%	±%
UMP	Philippe Douste-Blazy	16,908	41.40	
LV	Pierre Labeyrie	11,532	28.23	
FN	Charles Soeur	3,359	8.22	
Far left	Salah Amokrane	3,328	8.15	
PCF	Claudie Fontes	1,341	3.28	
LCR	Frederic Borras	1,137	2.78	
Others	N/A	3,239		
Turnout		41,489	64.80	
2nd round result
UMP	Philippe Douste-Blazy	18,410	50.84	
LV	Pierre Labeyrie	17,802	49.16	
Turnout		37,283	58.23	
UMP gain from UDF				

== Sources ==
- Official results of French elections from 1998: "Résultats électoraux officiels en France" (in French). Archived from the original on 20 December 2011.
