= Catherine Lemorton =

French politician

députée Catherine Lemorton
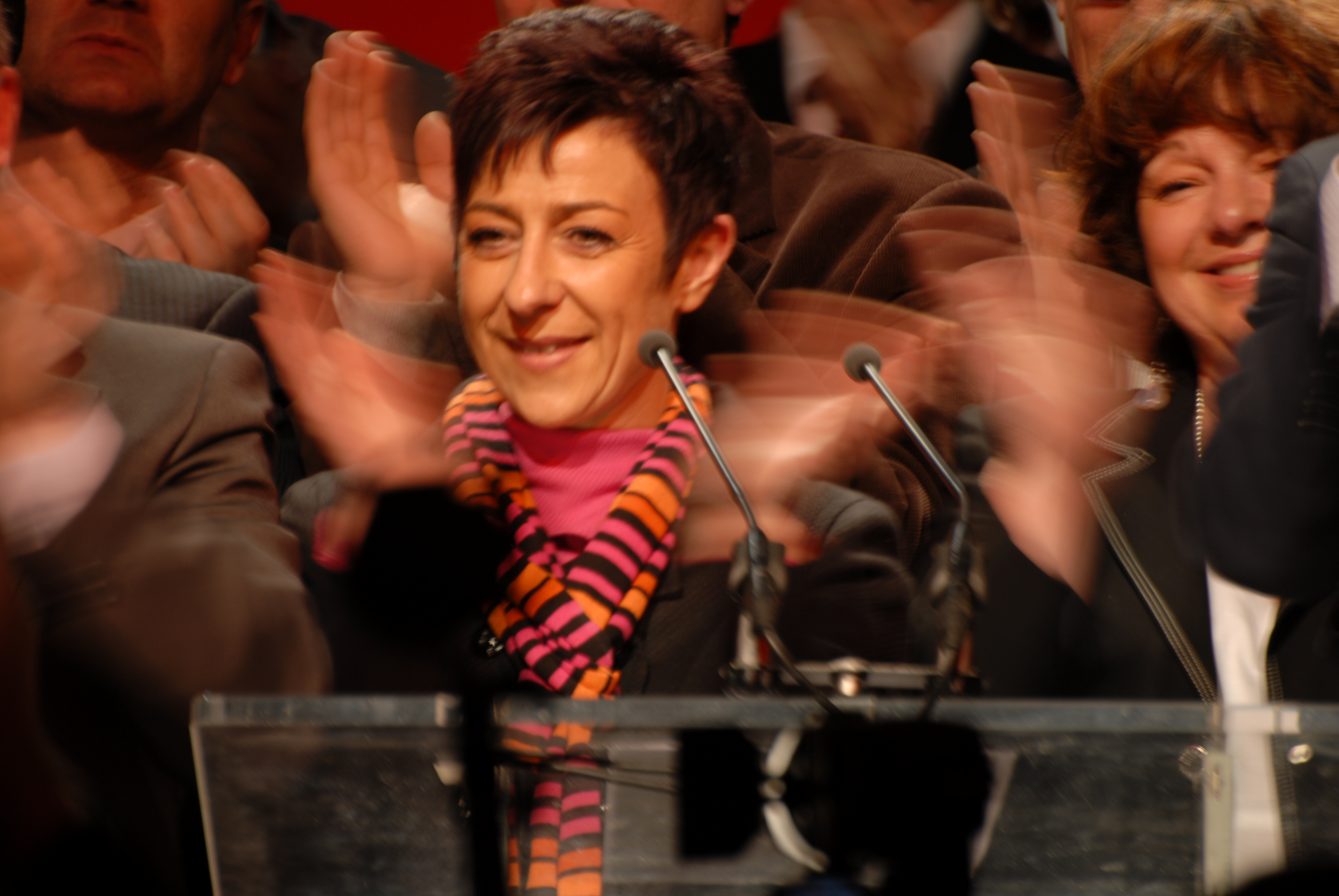
- Catherine Lemorton at a rallye in Toulouse

Assembly Member for Haute-Garonne's 1st constituency, National Assembly of France
- In office 17 June 2007 – 2017
- Preceded by: Bernadette Païx
- Succeeded by: Pierre Cabaré

Personal details
- Born: 20 June 1961 (age 65) Troyes, Aube
- Party: Socialist Party (France)

Catherine Lemorton is a French pharmacist and politician. She was a member of the National Assembly of France, representing Haute-Garonne's 1st constituency, based in Toulouse, as a member of the Socialist party from 2007 to 2017. She won the 2007 election, defeating Jean-Luc Moudenc who was mayor of Toulouse at the time.

== Parliamentary action ==
Catherine Lemorton is known for her report (la prescription, la consommation et la fiscalité des médicaments) on pharmaceutical drugs, regarded as taking part in a fight against the lobbies of the pharmaceutical industry and the conflicts of interest in medicament's policies.
