= Haute-Garonne's 3rd constituency =

Constituency of the National Assembly of France

3rd constituency of Haute-Garonne
- inline Constituency of the National Assembly of France

- Location of constituency in Department

- Location of Haute-Garonne in France
- Deputy: Corinne Vignon; RE
- Department: Haute-Garonne

The 3rd constituency of Haute-Garonne is a French legislative constituency in the Haute-Garonne département.

== Deputies ==
Election	Member	Party	Notes
1988	Claude Ducert	PS	
1993	Serge Didier	UDF	
1997	Pierre Cohen	PS	
2002	Pierre Cohen	PS	
2007	Pierre Cohen	PS	
2012	Jean-Luc Moudenc	UMP	Resigned when elected mayor of Toulouse
2014 by-election	Laurence Arribagé	UMP	
2017	Corinne Vignon	LREM	
2022	Corinne Vignon	RE	
2024	Corinne Vignon	RE	

== Election results ==
=== 2024 ===
Candidate	Party	Alliance	First round			Second round		
Candidate	Party	Alliance	Votes	%	+/–	Votes	%	+/–
Agathe Roby	LFI	NFP	21,064	34.58	+2.98	22,986	38.31	-5.98
Corinne Vignon	REN	Ensemble	20,227	33.20	+3.93	23,650	39.42	-16.29
Stéphanie Alarcon	RN		13,022	21.38	+12.61	13,366	22.28	new
Clément Delmas	LR	UDC	3,307	5.43	-10.67			
Baptiste Robert	DIV		828	1.36	new			
Marie-Pierre Bouchet	REG		731	1.20	new			
Philippe Soleri	REC		683	1.12	-3.78			
Domitille Allorant	ECO		613	1.01	new			
Malena Adrada	LO		254	0.42	-0.16			
Philippe Maury	RES!		162	0.27	new			
Noël Némouthé	REG		29	0.05	new			
Votes			60,920	100.00		60,002	100.00	
Valid votes			60,920	98.16	-0.55	60,002	97.76	+3.78
Blank votes			815	1.31	+0.44	1,016	1.66	-2.57
Null votes			328	0.53	+0.11	358	0.58	-1.21
Turnout			62,063	75.76	+17.40	61,376	74.92	+18.66
Abstentions			19,856	24.24	-17.40	20,542	25.08	-18.66
Registered voters			81,919			81,918		
Result			RE HOLD					

=== 2022 ===
Legislative Election 2022: Haute-Garonne's 3rd constituency
Party	Candidate	Votes	%	±%
LFI (NUPÉS)	Agathe Roby	14,695	31.60	+4.00
LREM (Ensemble)	Corinne Vignon	13,614	29.27	-10.34
LR (UDC)	Laurence Arribagé	7,488	16.10	−6.17
RN	Stéphanie Alarcon	4,080	8.77	+2.17
REC	Camille Dulon	2,281	4.90	N/A
PRG	Patrice Mur	1,841	3.96	N/A
DVE	Benoît Calmels	1,588	3.41	N/A
Others	N/A	918		
Turnout		47,112	58.36	+2.22
2nd round result
LREM (Ensemble)	Corinne Vignon	23,780	55.71	+2.74
LFI (NUPÉS)	Agathe Roby	18,905	44.29	N/A
Turnout		42,685	56.26	+10.34
LREM hold				

=== 2017 ===
Candidate	Label	First round		Second round	
Candidate	Label	Votes	%	Votes	%
Corinne Vignon	REM	17,150	39.61	16,254	52.97
Laurence Arribagé	LR	9,642	22.27	14,429	47.03
Gilles Naudy	FI	5,377	12.42		
Isabelle Hardy	PS	3,716	8.58		
Sonia Decamps	FN	2,859	6.60		
Yannick Bourlès	ECO	1,907	4.40		
Martine Croquette	PCF	952	2.20		
Véronique Corchia	DIV	364	0.84		
Michel Kaluszynski	DVG	332	0.77		
Sébastien Fabre	DIV	316	0.73		
Romain Gaboriaud	DIV	199	0.46		
Michel Laserge	EXG	153	0.35		
Benoît Calmels	ECO	131	0.30		
Marie Bruniquel	DIV	109	0.25		
Marie-Ange Thébaud	ECO	94	0.22		
Votes		43,301	100.00	30,683	100.00
Valid votes		43,301	98.73	30,683	85.56
Blank votes		396	0.90	3,975	11.08
Null votes		161	0.37	1,204	3.36
Turnout		43,858	56.14	35,862	45.92
Abstentions		34,261	43.86	42,242	54.08
Registered voters		78,119		78,104	
Source: Ministry of the Interior

=== 2012 ===
2012 legislative election in Haute-Garonne's 3rd constituency
Candidate	Party	First round		Second round	
Candidate	Party	Votes	%	Votes	%
Jean-Luc Moudenc	UMP	15,901	35.14%	21,650	50.41%
François Simon	EELV–PS	10,064	22.24%	21,300	49.59%
Alain Fillola		9,664	21.36%		
Sandrine Cabioch	FN	3,534	7.81%		
Martine Croquette	FG	2,905	6.42%		
Laurence Massat Guiraud-Chaumeil	PR	1,462	3.23%		
Nicolas Canzian	AEI	537	1.19%		
Marie-Claire Danen	PCD	466	1.03%		
Carole Fabre	PP	330	0.73%		
Thomas Couderette	????	190	0.42%		
Sandra Torremocha	LO	111	0.25%		
Clément Satger	SP	57	0.13%		
Monique Crevelle		24	0.05%		
Valid votes		45,245	99.13%	42,950	97.29%
Spoilt and null votes		399	0.87%	1,197	2.71%
Votes cast / turnout		45,644	62.41%	44,147	60.37%
Abstentions		27,487	37.59%	28,975	39.63%
Registered voters		73,131	100.00%	73,122	100.00%

=== 2007 ===
Legislative Election 2007: Haute-Garonne's 3rd constituency
Party	Candidate	Votes	%	±%
PS	Pierre Cohen	20,550	37.43	
UMP	Marie-Claire Danen	15,861	28.89	
MoDem	Charles Urgell	5,080	9.25	
NM	Jean-Marie Belin	3,619	6.59	
LV	Henri Arevalo	2,823	5.14	
Far left	Myriam Martin	1,817	3.31	
FN	Serge Laroze	1,793	3.27	
PCF	Nathalie Faisans	1,439	2.62	
Others	N/A	1,923		
Turnout		55,642	64.94	
2nd round result
PS	Pierre Cohen	31,045	57.26	
UMP	Marie-Claire Danen	23,171	42.74	
Turnout		55,642	64.94	
PS hold				

=== 2002 ===
Legislative Election 2002: Haute-Garonne's 3rd constituency
Party	Candidate	Votes	%	±%
UMP	Jean-Luc Moudenc	21,111	37.76	
PS	Pierre Cohen	20,281	36.28	
FN	Serge Laroze	4,641	8.30	
LV	Henri Arevalo	2,609	4.67	
PCF	Christine Rosemberg	1,465	2.62	
LCR	Myriam Martin	1,328	2.38	
Others	N/A	4,474		
Turnout		56,881	71.97	
2nd round result
PS	Pierre Cohen	26,552	51.05	
UMP	Jean-Luc Moudenc	25,455	48.95	
Turnout		53,611	67.74	
PS hold				

=== 1997 ===
Legislative Election 1997: Haute-Garonne's 3rd constituency
Party	Candidate	Votes	%	±%
PS	Pierre Cohen	17,230	34.55	
UDF	Serge Didier	15,030	30.14	
FN	Serge Laroze	5,410	10.85	
PCF	Jean Zanesco	3,768	7.56	
LV	Henri Aravelo	2,180	4.37	
LO	Jacqueline Santi	1,506	3.02	
DVD	Marie-Pierre Chaumette	1,376	2.76	
DVE	Dominique Gilbon	1,029	2.06	
Others	N/A	2,342		
Turnout		52,060	70.49	
2nd round result
PS	Pierre Cohen	28,826	55.35	
UDF	Serge Didier	23,257	44.65	
Turnout		54,840	74.26	
PS gain from UDF				
