= Hélène Mignon =

French politician (1934–2026)

Member of the National Assemnbly for Haute-Garonne's 6th constituency
- In office 12 June 1988 – 1 April 1993
- Preceded by: none (proportional representation in 8th Legislature)
- Succeeded by: Françoise de Veyrinas
- In office 1 June 1997 – 25 June 2007
- Preceded by: Alain Barrès
- Succeeded by: Monique Iborra

Mayor of Muret
- In office 1989–1995
- Preceded by: Jacques Douzans
- Succeeded by: Alain Barrès

Personal details
- Born: 26 June 1934 Toulouse, France
- Died: May 2026 (aged 91)
- Party: Socialist Party
- Profession: Physician

Hélène Mignon (26 June 1934 – May 2026) was a French politician, who represented Haute-Garonne's 6th constituency from 1988 to 1993 and again from 1997 to 2007, as a member of the Socialist Party. She was made a Chevalier (Knight) of the Legion of Honour in 2009.

Hélène Mignon died in May 2026, at the age of 91.
