= Haute-Garonne's 6th constituency =

Constituency of the National Assembly of France

6th constituency of Haute-Garonne
- inline Constituency of the National Assembly of France

- Location of constituency in Department

- Location of Haute-Garonne in France
- Deputy: Arnaud Simion; PS
- Department: Haute-Garonne

The 6th constituency of Haute-Garonne is a French legislative constituency in the Haute-Garonne département.

== Deputies ==
Election	Member	Party	Notes
1988	Hélène Mignon	PS	
1993	Françoise de Veyrinas	UDF	
1995	Alain Barrès	UDF	Substitute for Françoise de Veyrinas
1997	Hélène Mignon	PS	
2002	Hélène Mignon	PS	
2007	Monique Iborra	PS	
2012	Monique Iborra	PS	
2017	Monique Iborra	LREM	
2022	Monique Iborra	RE	
2024	Arnaud Simion	PS	

== Election results ==
=== 2024 ===
Candidate	Party	Alliance	First round			Second round		
Candidate	Party	Alliance	Votes	%	+/–	Votes	%	+/–
Arnaud Simion	PS	NFP	29,031	34.03	+4.64	47,670	60.40	+10.40
Nadine Demange-Fierlej	RN		26,379	30.92	+14.12	31,256	39.60	new
Monique Iborra	REN	Ensemble	25,256	29.60	-0.67	withdrew		
Sandra Laporte	ECO		2,773	3.25	-1.11			
Annaël Gérard	REC		1,104	1.29	-2.13			
Michèle Marie Rose Albertine Puel	LO		774	0.91	+0.22			
Votes			85,317	100.00		78,926	100.00	
Valid votes			85,317	97.34	-0.58	78,926	91.07	-1.15
Blank votes			1,621	1.85	+0.39	5,902	6.81	+1.62
Null votes			714	0.81	+0.19	1,834	2.12	-0.47
Turnout			87,652	74.68	+20.84	86,662	73.82	+22.09
Abstentions			29,722	25.32	-20.84	30,733	26.18	-22.09
Registered voters			117,374			117,395		
Result			PS GAIN FROM RE					

=== 2022 ===
Legislative Election 2022: Haute-Garonne's 6th constituency
Party	Candidate	Votes	%	±%
LREM (Ensemble)	Monique Iborra	18,437	30.27	-7.89
PS (NUPÉS)	Fabien Jouve	17,904	29.39	-2.53
RN	Lydia Aiello	10,231	16.80	+6.86
DVG	Christelle Helman	2,697	4.43	N/A
LR	Christophe Alves	2,658	4.36	−5.91
REC	Dominique Piussan	2,081	3.42	N/A
Others	N/A	4,247		
Turnout		62,207	53.84	±0.00
2nd round result
LREM (Ensemble)	Monique Iborra	27,570	50.00	-5.87
PS (NUPÉS)	Fabien Jouve	27,566	50.00	+5.87
Turnout		55,136	51.73	+5.27
LREM hold				

=== 2017 ===
Candidate	Label	First round		Second round	
Candidate	Label	Votes	%	Votes	%
Monique Iborra	REM	23,271	39.54	25,934	55.87
Patrick Jimena	FI	9,316	15.83	20,483	44.13
Camille Pouponneau	PS	7,221	12.27		
Michèle Pellizzon	FN	6,301	10.70		
Damien Laborde	LR	6,165	10.47		
Stéphane Renaux	ECO	2,243	3.81		
Daniel Fourmy	PCF	796	1.35		
Laurent Casbas	DLF	772	1.31		
Julien Holmgren	DIV	674	1.15		
Lise Rieux	DIV	481	0.82		
Wolfgang Mahle	DIV	422	0.72		
Michèle Puel	EXG	316	0.54		
Dominique Liot	DIV	315	0.54		
Guy Jovelin	EXD	290	0.49		
Denis Louviot	DVG	277	0.47		
Ahmed Ferhane	ECO	1	0.00		
Votes		58,861	100.00	46,417	100.00
Valid votes		58,861	98.15	46,417	89.72
Blank votes		745	1.24	3,449	6.67
Null votes		363	0.61	1,868	3.61
Turnout		59,969	53.84	51,734	46.46
Abstentions		51,410	46.16	59,621	53.54
Registered voters		111,379		111,355	
Source: Ministry of the Interior

=== 2012 ===
2012 legislative election in Haute-Garonne's 6th constituency
Candidate	Party	First round		Second round	
Candidate	Party	Votes	%	Votes	%
Monique Iborra	PS	27,853	44.95%	36,421	65.50%
Jocelyne Vidal	UMP	12,828	20.70%	19,182	34.50%
Michèle Pellizzon	FN	8,452	13.64%		
Alain Refalo	EELV	4,376	7.06%		
Rémi Vincent	FG	3,797	6.13%		
Marthe Marti	MoDem	1,995	3.22%		
Jérémy Collot	PP	684	1.10%		
Grigori Michel	NC	520	0.84%		
Fabrice Guin	AEI	484	0.78%		
Michèle Puel	LO	341	0.55%		
Florian Gely	NPA	285	0.46%		
Sylvain Roques	MPF	223	0.36%		
Guy Syry	SP	124	0.20%		
Valid votes		61,962	98.45%	55,603	95.65%
Spoilt and null votes		976	1.55%	2,531	4.35%
Votes cast / turnout		62,938	60.93%	58,134	56.28%
Abstentions		40,358	39.07%	45,152	43.72%
Registered voters		103,296	100.00%	103,286	100.00%

=== 2007 ===
Legislative Election 2007: Haute-Garonne's 6th constituency
Party	Candidate	Votes	%	±%
UMP	Françoise de Veyrinas	29,020	36.55	
PS	Monique Iborra	26,422	33.28	
MoDem	Elisabeth Husson	8,042	10.13	
FN	Artemisa Maries	3,006	3.79	
PCF	Mohamed El Bachir	2,160	2.72	
Far left	Marthe Miquel	2,079	2.62	
Far left	Christine Rousse Yahiaoui	1,719	2.17	
Others	N/A	6,940		
Turnout		80,825	62.16	
2nd round result
PS	Monique Iborra	43,785	55.10	
UMP	Françoise de Veyrinas	35,686	44.90	
Turnout		81,898	62.99	
PS hold				

=== 2002 ===
Legislative Election 2002: Haute-Garonne's 6th constituency
Party	Candidate	Votes	%	±%
PS	Hélène Mignon	28,443	37.20	
UMP	Françoise de Veyrinas	26,441	34.58	
FN	Pierre Catel	9,140	11.95	
LV	Dominique Liot	3,068	4.01	
PCF	Bernard Marquie	2,317	3.03	
Others	N/A	7,055		
Turnout		78,108	69.11	
2nd round result
PS	Hélène Mignon	36,978	53.57	
UMP	Françoise de Veyrinas	32,053	46.43	
Turnout		72,067	63.77	
PS hold				

=== 1997 ===
Legislative Election 1997: Haute-Garonne's 6th constituency
Party	Candidate	Votes	%	±%
PS	Hélène Mignon	23,062	34.96	
UDF	Françoise de Veyrinas	17,745	26.90	
FN	Jean-Pierre Atoch	10,020	15.19	
PCF	Bernard Marquié	5,793	8.78	
LO	Martine Guiraud	2,240	3.40	
LV	Dominique Liot	2,129	3.23	
GE	Gérard Arnaudé	1,605	2.43	
Others	N/A	3,371		
Turnout		68,910	71.37	
2nd round result
PS	Hélène Mignon	39,767	58.47	
UDF	Françoise de Veyrinas	28,251	41.53	
Turnout		72,481	75.07	
PS gain from UDF				
