= Bernadette Païx =

French politician

- Parliamentary group: UMP

Deputy for Haute-Garonne's 1st constituency in the National Assembly of France
- In office 1 May 2004 – 19 June 2007
- Preceded by: Philippe Douste-Blazy
- Succeeded by: Catherine Lemorton

Councillor, Regional Council of Midi-Pyrénées

Personal details
- Born: March 19, 1950 (age 76) Bourbaki (Algeria)
- Spouse: Jean-Claude Paix

Bernadette Païx, born 19 March 1950 in Bourbaki (Algeria), is a French politician.

She was the substitute candidate for Philippe Douste-Blazy in the 2002 national assembly election for Haute-Garonne's 1st constituency and became the deputy on 1 May 2004 after he was appointed Minister of Health.

She was a member of the national assembly study group on Tibet. She did not contest the 2007 election.
