= Corinne Vignon =

French politician

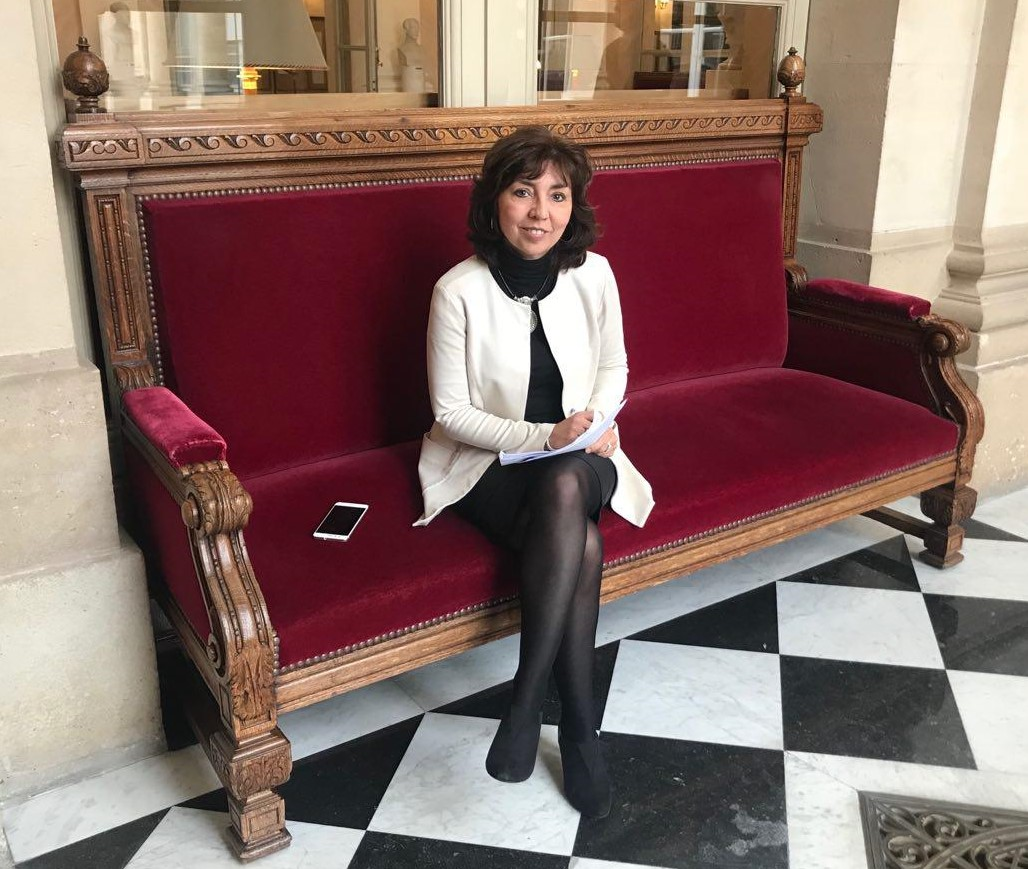

Member of the National Assembly for Haute-Garonne's 3rd constituency
- Incumbent
- Assumed office 21 June 2017
- Preceded by: Laurence Arribagé

Personal details
- Born: 10 June 1963 (age 62) Agen, France
- Party: Renaissance

Corinne Vignon (born 10 June 1963) is a French politician of Renaissance (RE) who has been serving as a member of the French National Assembly since the 2017 elections, representing the 3rd constituency of Haute-Garonne.

In parliament, Vignon serves on the Committee on Social Affairs. She also chairs of a cross-party working group on pension reform. Since 2020, she has been serving as her parliamentary group's co-rapporteur on the government's pension reform plans, alongside Guillaume Gouffier-Cha, Jacques Maire and Carole Grandjean.

In addition to her committee assignments, Vignon is a member of the French-Mexican Parliamentary Friendship Group.

== See also ==
- 2017 French legislative election
