= Philippe Douste-Blazy =

French politician (born 1953)

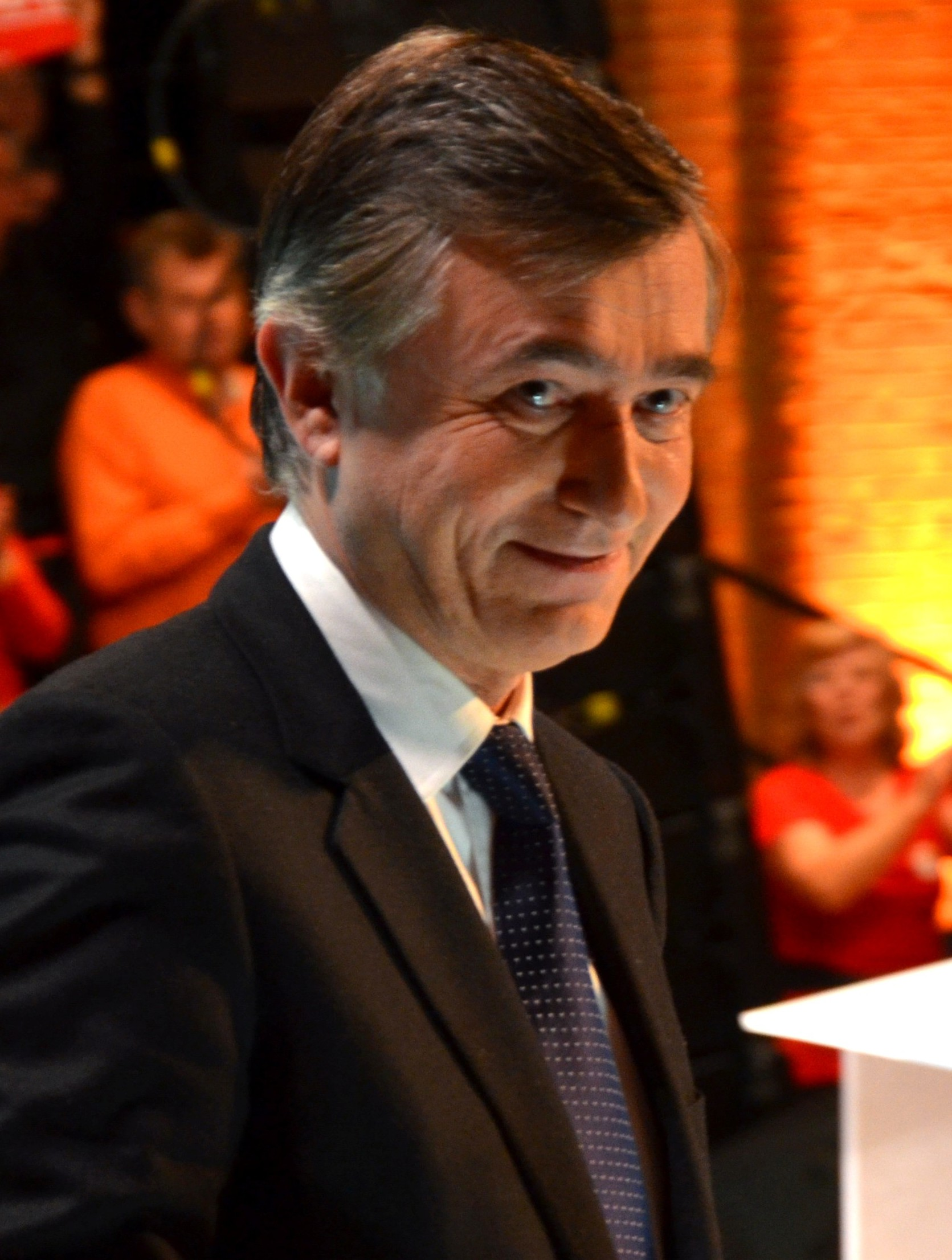

Minister of Foreign Affairs
- In office 2 June 2005 – 15 May 2007
- Prime Minister: Dominique de Villepin
- Preceded by: Michel Barnier
- Succeeded by: Bernard Kouchner

Minister of Health
- In office 31 March 2004 – 2 June 2005
- Prime Minister: Jean-Pierre Raffarin
- Preceded by: Jean-François Mattéi
- Succeeded by: Xavier Bertrand

Minister of Culture
- In office 18 May 1995 – 2 June 1997
- Prime Minister: Alain Juppé
- Preceded by: Jacques Toubon
- Succeeded by: Catherine Trautmann

Member of the National Assembly for Haute-Garonne's 1st constituency
- In office 2 April 2001 – 30 July 2004
- Preceded by: Dominique Baudis
- Succeeded by: Bernadette Païx

Mayor of Toulouse
- In office 23 March 2001 – 29 April 2004
- Preceded by: Dominique Baudis
- Succeeded by: Jean-Luc Moudenc

Personal details
- Born: 1 January 1953 (age 73) Lourdes, France
- Party: Centre of Social Democrats (Before 1995); Democratic Force (1995–1997); Union for French Democracy (1997–2002); Union for a Popular Movement (2002–2015); The Republicans (2015–present)
- Education: Paul Sabatier University

Philippe Douste-Blazy (French pronunciation: [filip dust blazi]; born 1 January 1953) is a French United Nations official and former centre-right politician. Over the course of his career, he served as Under-Secretary-General of the United Nations, Special Adviser on Innovative Financing for Development in the UN and chairman of UNITAID.

He previously served as French Minister for Health (1993–1995 and 2004–2005), Minister of Culture (1995–1997) and as Foreign Minister in the cabinet of Dominique de Villepin (2005–2007). He was mayor of Lourdes 1989–2000 and mayor of Toulouse 2001–2004.

Originally a member of the Centre of Social Democrats (CDS), the Christian Democrat component of the Union for French Democracy (UDF) party, he later joined the Union for a Popular Movement.

A cardiologist by profession, he became professor at Toulouse Sciences University in 1988.

== Early years ==
Born in Lourdes in the Hautes-Pyrénées, Douste-Blazy studied medicine in Toulouse, where he had his first job in 1976. He then worked as a cardiologist in Lourdes and Toulouse, namely in Purpan's hospital from 1986. He then joined the French Society of Cardiology. He became Professor of Medicine at Toulouse Sciences University in 1988. Since 2016, he has also been a visiting professor at the Harvard T.H. Chan School of Public Health.

== Political career ==
=== Early beginnings ===
A member of the Centre of Social Democrats (CDS), the Christian Democrat component of the Union for French Democracy (UDF), Douste-Blazy entered politics in March 1989, being elected mayor of Lourdes. He was also elected national director of the association of research against elevations of cholesterol.

=== Member of the European Parliament, 1989–1993 ===
In the 1989 European elections, Douste-Blazy was elected Member of the European Parliament in June of the same year. He was then a member of the European People's Party.

During his time in parliament, Douste-Blazy served on the Committee on the Environment, Public Health and Consumer Protection. In addition to his committee assignments, he was a member of the parliament's delegation to the Joint Assembly of the Agreement between the African, Caribbean and Pacific States (ACP countries) and the European Economic Community.

=== Minister of Health, 1993–1995 ===
Elected deputy for Hautes-Pyrénées département in March 1993, Douste-Blazy was appointed to the cabinet of Edouard Balladur as Minister-Delegate (a junior minister) at the Ministry for Health.

In May 1994, in his capacity as minister, Douste-Blazy visited Rwanda and refugee camps in neighboring Tanzania to witness the consequences of the genocidal mass slaughter of Tutsi by members of Rwanda's Hutu majority government. During his time in office, France approved a bill which prohibited postmenopausal pregnancy, which Douste-Blazy said was "...immoral as well as dangerous to the health of mother and child."

Douste-Blazy stayed at the ministry until the 1995 presidential election. In March 1994, he was elected at Hautes-Pyrénées's General Council. He became general secretary of the CDS in December and Government's spokesman one month later.

=== Minister of Culture, 1995–1997 ===
In May 1995, after the election of Jacques Chirac as President of France, a candidacy he was backing, Douste-Blazy was nominated Minister of Culture. In June, he was also re-elected Mayor of Lourdes then, five months later, elected general secretary of Democratic Force, the party which replaced the CDS .

In June 1997, the overwhelming defeat of the Presidential Majority during legislative election made him lose his position as Minister of Culture, but he remained deputy of Hautes-Pyrénées and became president of the UDF parliamentary group at the French National Assembly. During the election campaign he was badly hurt when a mentally unstable man stabbed him in the back as he was campaigning in Lourdes. It turned out that the Minister's assailant was an Albanian refugee who had already tried to attack Mr. Douste-Blazy in 1992.

At the head of the centrist parliamentary group, he was often opposed to the UDF party leader François Bayrou. Indeed, while the latter advocated the emancipation of the UDF towards its Gaullist allies, Douste-Blazy proposed the union of the right-wing parties behind President Chirac.

=== Mayor of Toulouse, 2001–2004 ===
Seeking one of the country's most important municipal seats, Douste-Blazy narrowly won the election for Mayor of Toulouse in 2001, which saw the left making its best showing in decades. Once in office, he had to deal with a reinvigorated political opposition, as well as with the dramatic explosion of the AZF plant in late 2001.

Douste-Blazy supported Jacques Chirac in the two rounds of the 2002 presidential election, in spite of the candidacy of François Bayrou. Consequently, he participated to the unification of some right-wing groups in the Union for a Popular Movement (UMP) and appeared as a possible prime minister. However, once re-elected, President Chirac choose Jean-Pierre Raffarin and Philippe Douste-Blazy refused to resign from its mayoralty to be minister. The same year, he changed of constituency and was elected deputy for Haute-Garonne département.

=== Minister of Health, 2004–2005 ===
After the electoral crash of the UMP in the 2004 regional election, Douste-Blazy left its function in Toulouse and returned at the Ministry of Health. His predecessor Jean-François Mattéi was discredited due to his response to the 2003 European heat wave. He was the instigator of a new reform of medical insurances.

=== Minister of Foreign Affairs, 2005–2007 ===
In a government reshuffle following the rejection of the European constitution in 29 May 2005's referendum, Douste-Blazy replaced Michel Barnier and became Minister of Foreign Affairs in the government of Prime Minister Dominique de Villepin.

In his capacity as minister, Douste-Blazy summoned Iran's ambassador to France in October 2005, demanding an explanation for President Mahmoud Ahmadinejad 's public call for Israel to be "wiped off the map." He announced France's support for the Israeli separation barrier on 25 October 2006. In November 2006, he summoned Israel's ambassador to Paris, Daniel Shek to express "serious concern" about violations of a ceasefire that ended the 33-day war between Israel and Hezbollah guerrillas.

During his time in office, France played a central role in international attempts to end the bloodshed in the 2006 Lebanon War. In October 2006, the French National Assembly, despite Douste-Blazy's opposition, passed a bill which if approved by the Senate and would make Armenian genocide denial a crime.

Douste-Blazy left the position with the departure of Jacques Chirac from the Presidency in May 2007. He did not run for a new parliamentary term in the 2007 elections.

On 6 November 2007, Douste-Blazy was among the guests invited to the state dinner hosted by President George W. Bush in honor of President Nicolas Sarkozy at the White House.

== United Nations ==
While serving as foreign minister of France, Douste-Blazy became chairman of the executive board of UNITAID, the International Drug Purchase Facility hosted by the World Health Organization which France co-founded in 2006.

On 19 February 2008, Douste-Blazy was appointed by United Nations Secretary-General Ban Ki-moon as Special Adviser on Innovative Financing for Development, with the rank of UN Under-Secretary-General. From 2008 until 2009, he was a member of the High Level Taskforce on Innovative International Financing for Health Systems, co-chaired by Gordon Brown and Robert Zoellick. He is also the chairman of the board of the Millennium Foundation for Innovate Finance for Health.

His main responsibilities as the Special Adviser included promoting UNITAID and other sources of financing for the achievement of the Millennium Development Goals (MDGs), advising the United Nations Secretary-General on financing solutions to the implementation of the Monterrey consensus, coordinating with the High-Level Group on the MDGs, and liaising with various UN and non-UN related institutions, such as the main Bretton Woods institutions, Organization for Economic Cooperation and Development-Development Assistance Committee (OECD-DAC), the United Nations Development Group and the Millennium Communication Campaign.

Douste-Blazy was also in charge of organizing the first World Conference of Non-Governmental Donors, with a special focus on the financing for development provided by citizens, local and regional authorities, foundations, non-governmental organizations, economic and social representatives, faith groups and the private sector. It is hoped that these sources of funding could compensate the insufficient official development assistance in achieving the Millennium Development Goals.

Ahead of the 2012 presidential elections, Douste-Blazy announced in January 2012 that he no longer supported Nicolas Sarkozy and instead was lending his support to centrist candidate François Bayrou.

== Political functions ==
Governmental functions

Minister of Health and government's spokesman : 1993–1995.

Minister of Culture and government's spokesman : 1995–1997.

Minister of Solidarity, Health and Family : 2004–2005.

Minister of Foreign Affairs : 2005–2007.

Electoral mandates

European Parliament

Member of European Parliament : 1989–1993 (Became minister in 1993 and elected in parliamentary elections in March 1993).

National Assembly of France

President of the group of Union for French Democracy : 1998–2002.

Member of the National Assembly of France for Hautes-Pyrénées : Elected in March 1993 but he became minister / 1997–2001 (Resignation). Elected in 1993, reelected in 1997.

Member of the National Assembly of France for Haute-Garonne : 2001–2004 (Became minister in 2004). Elected in 2001, reelected in 2002.

General Council

General councillor of Hautes-Pyrénées : 1994–2001.

Municipal Council

Mayor of Toulouse : 2001–2004.

Deputy-mayor of Toulouse : 2004–2008.

Municipal councillor of Toulouse : 2001–2008.

Mayor of Lourdes : 1989–2000 (Resignation). Reelected in 1995.

Municipal councillor of Lourdes : 1989–2001. Reelected in 1995.

Urban community Council

President of the Urban community of Greater Toulouse : 2001–2008.

Member of the Urban community of Greater Toulouse : 2001–2008.

Political functions

General secretary of the Union for a Popular Movement : 2002–2004.

== Other activities ==
- GBCHealth, Member of the Board of Directors
- Innovative Finance Foundation (IFF), Member of the Advisory Board
- International Consortium on Anti-Virals (ICAV), Member of the Board of Directors

== Honours and recognition ==
- 1997 – Medal of the Oriental Republic of Uruguay
- 2004 – Honorary Knight Commander of The Most Excellent Order of the British Empire
- 2011 – Clinton Global Citizen Award of the Clinton Foundation

Political offices
Preceded by Jacques Toubon	Minister of Culture; 1995–1997	Succeeded by Catherine Trautmann
Preceded by Jean-François Mattéi	Minister of Health; 2004–2005	Succeeded by Xavier Bertrand
Preceded by Michel Barnier	Minister of Foreign Affairs; 2005–2007	Succeeded by Bernard Kouchner
