= List of mayors of Toulouse =

Mayor of Toulouse City Council
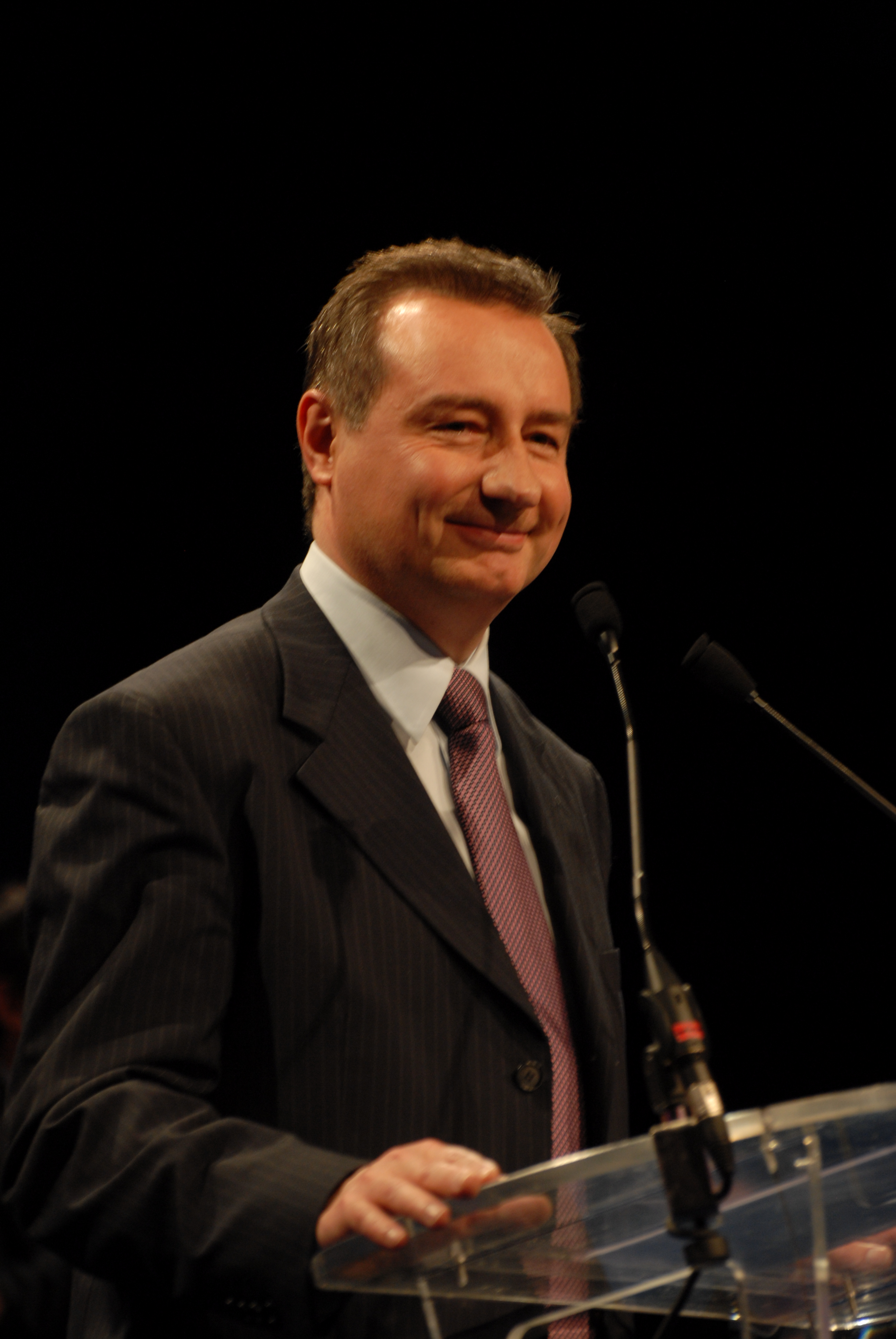
- Incumbent; Jean-Luc Moudenc since 4 April 2014
- Residence: Capitole de Toulouse
- Seat: Capitole de Toulouse, Toulouse, France
- Term length: 6 years
- Formation: 1790
- First holder: Joseph de Rigaud
- Final holder: Pierre Cohen
- Website: http://www.toulouse.fr/municipalite/conseil-municipal/maire

This page is a list of mayors of Toulouse since 1790.

The municipal law of 14 December 1789 created a General Council of the municipality of Toulouse whose eighteen members were elected for two years by the citizens. The first mayor was Joseph de Rigaud, 70 years old at that time, and a professor at the Faculty of Law. He took office on 28 February 1790. Previously, it was the elected Capitouls who ran the city until their city council was suppressed.

== 18th century ==
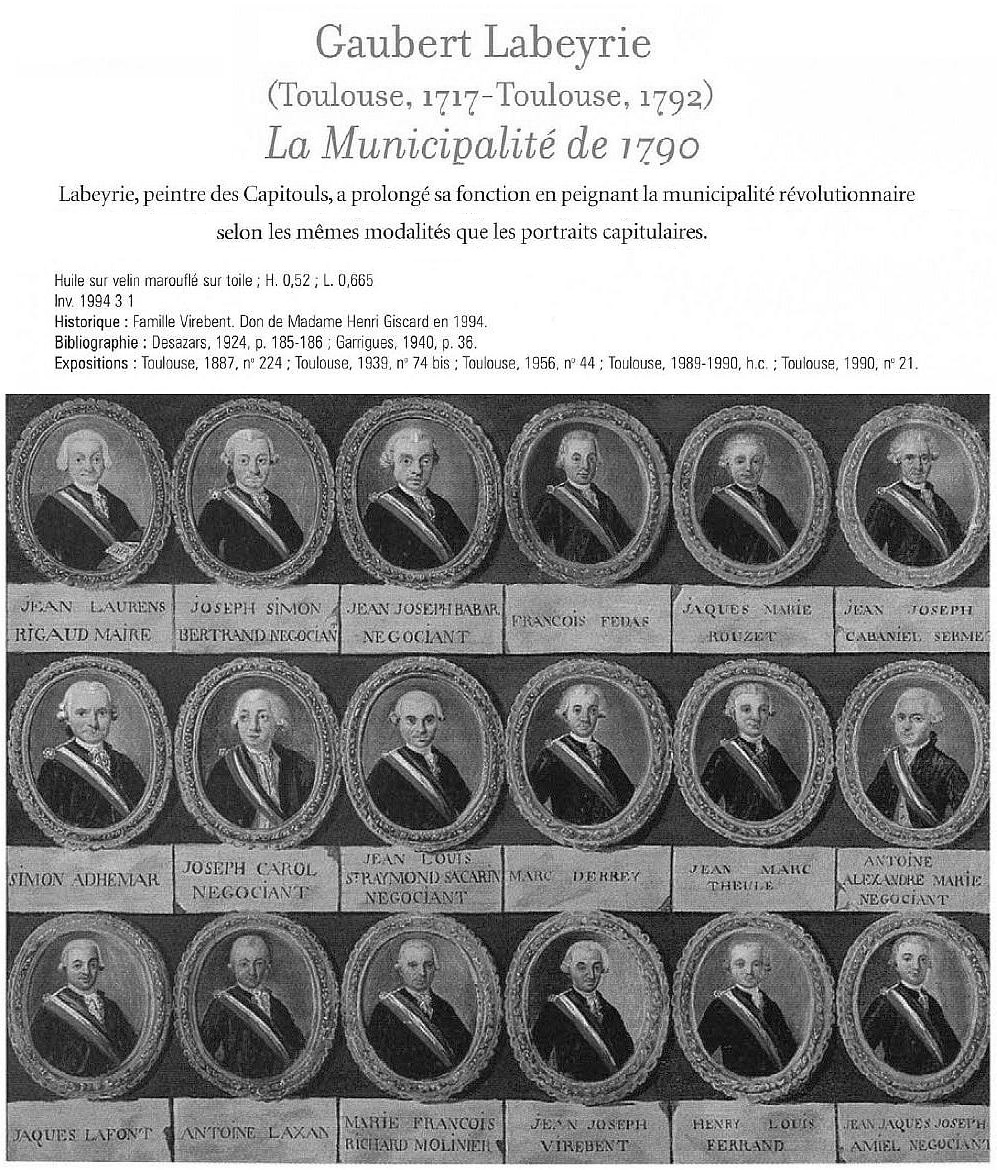
Municipality of Toulouse in 1790. (Joseph de Rigaud, 1st mayor at top left)

Name	Start of term	End of term	Ref
Joseph de Rigaud	28 February 1790	1 August 1792	
Marc Derrey de Belbèze	23 October 1792	1793	
Henri-Louis Ferrand	6 July 1793	13 October 1793	
Jean-Jacques Groussac	14 October 1793	15 November 1794	
Jean Cames	5 December 1794	1794	
Pierre Roussillou	4 August 1795	1795	
Souchon	9 November 1795	30 March 1797	
Hyacinthe Pellet-Desbarreaux	31 March 1797	20 April 1798	
Jacques Vaisse	20 April 1798	20 April 1799	
Paul Vaisse	11 May 1799	8 May 1800	

== 19th century ==
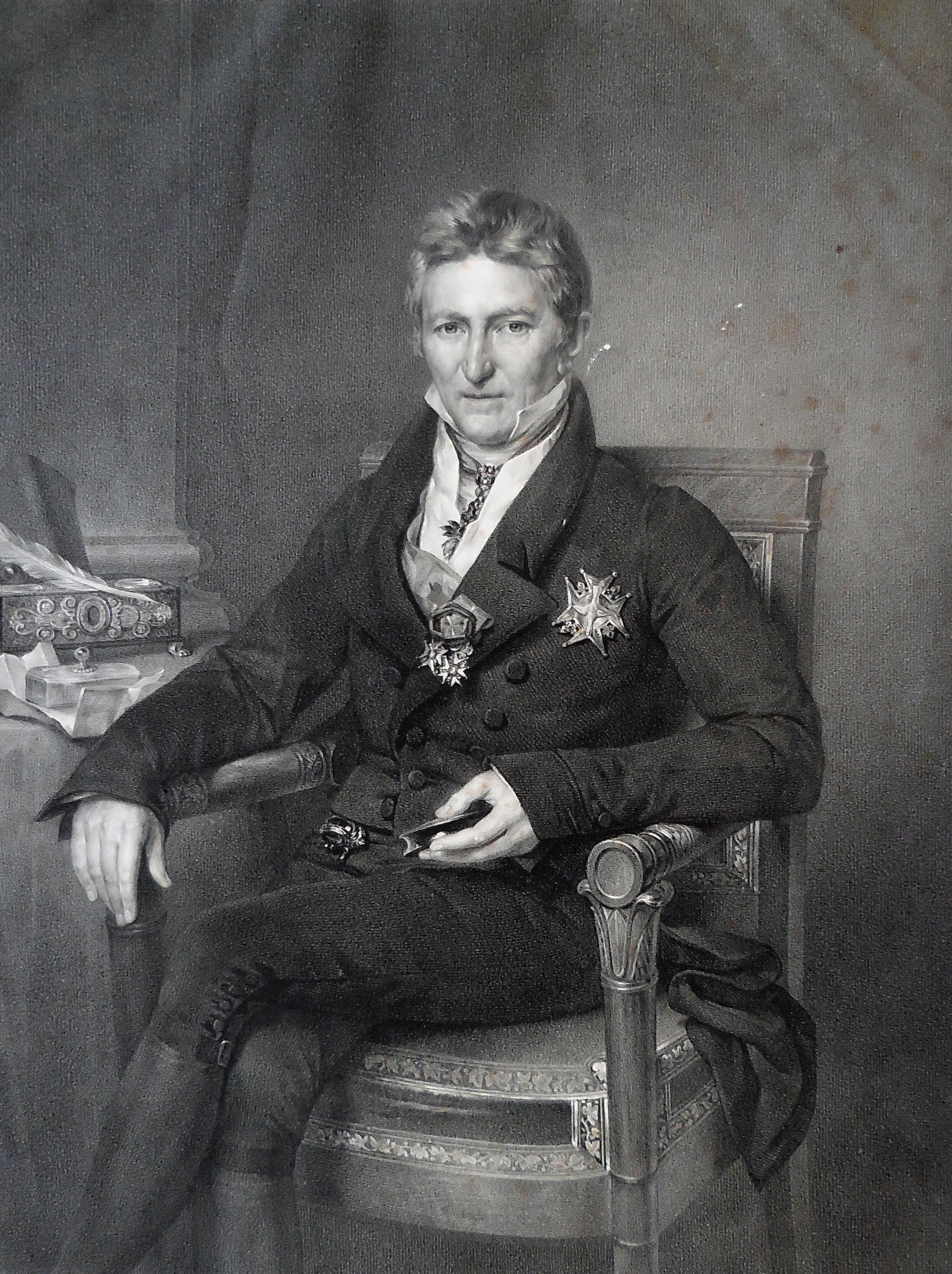
Count Joseph de Villèle, mayor de Toulouse from 1815 to 1818.

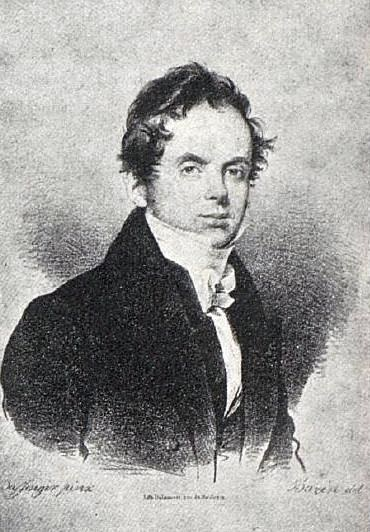
Guillaume-Isidore Baron de Montbel, mayor of Toulouse from 1826 to 1829.

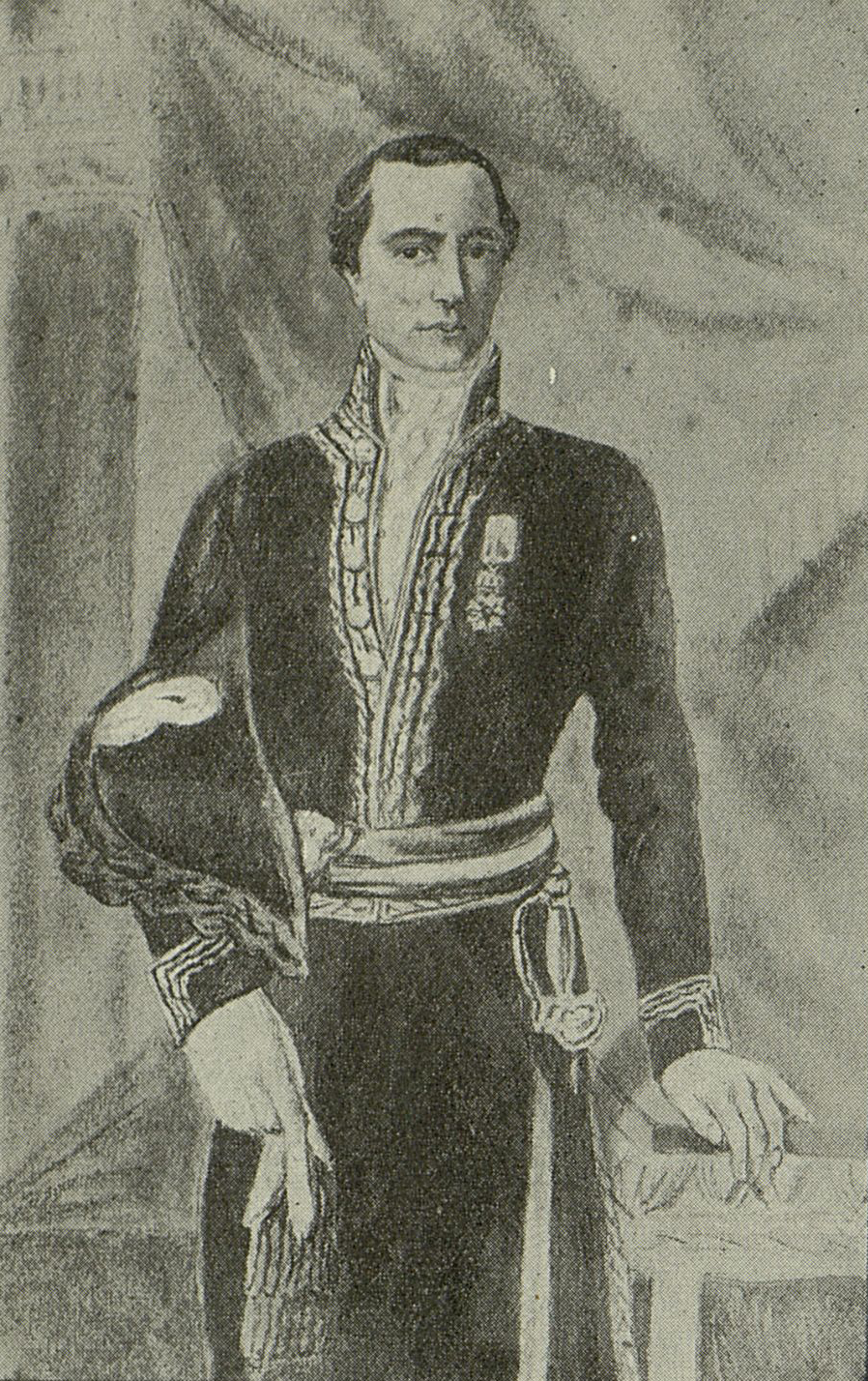
Jean Cabanis, mayor of Toulouse between 1845 and 1846.

Name	Start of term	End of term	Ref
Philippe-Isidore Picot de Lapeyrouse	25 April 1800	21 July 1806	
Raymond Lanneluc	11 September 1800	23 December 1800	
le baron Raymond de Bellegarde	1806	1811	
Joseph de Malaret	1811	1814	
Raymond Lanneluc	1813	1813	
Raymond Lanneluc	12 April 1814	13 April 1814	
Louis d'Escouloubre	1814	1814	
Raymond Lanneluc	April 1814	June 1814	
Joseph de Malaret	1814	1815	
Marie-Nicolas-Alexis Ferradou	5 June 1815	22 July 1815	
Raymond Lanneluc	24 July 1815	25 July 1815	
Joseph de Villèle	1815	1818	
Jacques Demouis	1815	22 April 1816	
Paul Thoron	1816	10 February 1817	
Bruno Dubourg	1817	1818	
Guillaume de Bellegarde	1818	1823	
Joseph d'Hargenvilliers	1823	1826	
Guillaume-Isidore Baron de Montbel	1826	1829	
Jean Gounon	1828	1829	
Athanase Rességuier	1829	1830	
Joseph Viguerie	3 August 1830	10 July 1833	
Joseph Arnoux	10 July 1833	3 August 1833	
Théodore Rolland	3 August 1833	2 October 1835	
Jacques Milhes	2 October 1835	10 May 1836	
Joseph Arnoux	18 March 1836	31 January 1839	
Armand Perpessac	31 January 1839	5 July 1841	
Benoît Arzac	12 July 1841	24 July 1841	
Le Baron Louis Lejeune	30 July 1841	6 December 1841	
Pierre Bories	6 December 1841	24 May 1843	
Noël Fornier	4 November 1842	24 May 1843	
Noël Fornier	24 May 1843	13 August 1843	
François Sans	3 September 1843	30 December 1843	
Jean Cabanis	3 January 1845	15 January 1847	
Jacques Milhes	15 January 1847	4 September 1847	
Auguste Lignières	5 September 1847	25 February 1848	
Nicolas Joly	25 February 1848	25 February 1848	
Adolphe-Félix Gatien-Arnoult	1 March 1848	1 March 1848	
Rey	12 April 1848	12 April 1848	
Benoît Arzac	7 June 1848	7 June 1848	
Pierre Roquelaine	16 June 1848	16 June 1848	
Pierre Roquelaine	24 August 1848	21 January 1948	
Théodore Rolland	24 January 1849	2 April 1949	
Alexandre Fourtanier	2 April 1949	9 April 1949	
François Sans	9 June 1849	24 June 1852	
Jean-Louis Cailhassou	24 June 1852	1 September 1855	
Antoine Policarpe	1 September 1855	29 July 1858	
Le Marquis Jean de Patras de Campaigno	29 July 1858	26 August 1865	
Jean Amilhau	26 August 1865	29 June 1867	
Édouard Filhol	29 June 1867	5 September 1870	
Adolphe-Félix Gatien-Arnoult	5 September 1870	6 October 1870	
Gustave Cousin	6 October 1870	20 January 1871	
Léonce Castelbou	20 January 1871	29 March 1871	
Proust et Frugier	26 March 1871	26 March 1871	
Edmond Valette	29 March 1871	16 April 1871	
Jean Fabre	16 April 1871	9 May 1871	
Henri Ebelot	9 May 1871	18 April 1874	
Le Vicomte François Toussaint	10 February 1874	10 May 1876	
Henri Ebelot	10 May 1876	22 September 1876	
Le Vicomte François Toussaint	22 September 1877	22 December 1877	
Henri Ebelot	22 December 1877	20 January 1881	
Léonce Castelbou	20 January 1881	24 August 1881	
Aimé Barthélemy	25 August 1881	30 December 1881	
Isidore Féral	4 January 1882	28 February 1882	
Théophile Huc	28 February 1882	20 April 1884	
Bertrand Lavigne	21 April 1884	11 May 1884	
Joseph Sirven	18 May 1884	19 May 1888	
Camille Ournac	20 May 1888	12 October 1892	
Honoré Serres	13 October 1892	22 September 1894	
Aristide Labéda	22 September 1894	24 January 1895	
Honoré Serres	24 January 1895	8 September 1896	
Jules Coumoul	12 September 1896	16 November 1896	
Honoré Serres	17 November 1896	29 September 1905	

== Since 1901 ==
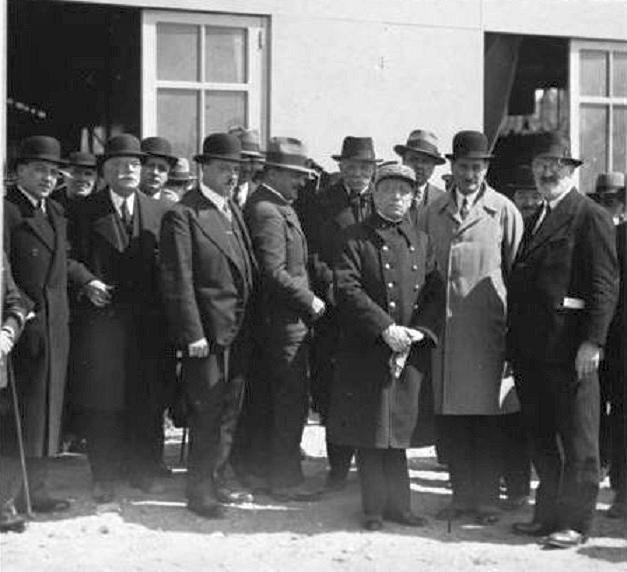
Etienne Billières (first on left) et Paul Feuga (second from the right), at the 1934 agricultural competition in Toulouse.

Portrait	Name	Start of term	End of term
	Dr. François Tranier	September 1905	January 1906
	Caussé	16 January 1906	February 1906
	Albert Bedouce	22 February 1906	October 1906
	Jean Rieux	5 October 1906	May 1908
	Raymond Leygue	18 May 1908	May 1912
	Jean Rieux	18 May 1912	December 1919
	Paul Feuga	10 December 1919	May 1925
	Etienne Billières	15 May 1925	February 1935
	Jules Julien	February 1935	May 1935
	Antoine Ellen-Prévot	11 May 1935	August 1940
	André Haon	August 1940	9 June 1944
	Albert Ginesty	9 June 1944	20 August 1944

No.	Portrait	Name	Start of term	End of term	Political affiliation	Notes
1		Raymond Badiou (born 14 August 1905 in Bellerive-sur-Allier, died 27 June 1996 in Paris)	August 1944	September 1958	SFIO	The liberation of Toulouse took place on 19 and 20 August 1944. A local liberation committee was immediately set up and played the role of a temporary municipality; it is headed by Raymond Badiou, who was elected mayor in 1945, then re-elected in 1947 and 1953. He led a cautious municipal policy, urbanizing Toulouse in a compact way to avoid the multiplication of networks, which led him to launch the first social housing programs in the immediate vicinity of the city.
Intérim de Georges Carrère from September until October 1958
2		Louis Bazerque (born 9 May 1912 in Toulouse, died 10 December 1992 in Toulouse)	October 1958	March 1971	SFIO	In ten years the town redevelops all its roads networks (including transport) and there is built 40,000 homes, a large part in a collaboration between the town hall and developers. After the cities of Aste and Empalot and facing the project Colomiers led by his colleague General Council Eugene Montel, Louis Bazerque launched the controversial project of Grand Mirail under the architectural responsibility of Georges Candilis, one of the main disciples of Le Corbusier. Symbol of access of the middle classes to comfort housing (hot water and electricity), this district extended the urbanization to the southwest.
3		Pierre Baudis (born 11 May 1916 in Decazeville, died 5 January 1997 in Toulouse)	March 1971	March 1983	UDF	
4		Dominique Baudis (born 14 April 1946 in Paris, died 10 April 2014 in Paris)	March 1983	23 January 2001	UDF	
Intérim de Guy Hersant from 23 January until 23 March 2001
5		Philippe Douste-Blazy (born 1 January 1953 à Lourdes)	23 March 2001	29 July 2004	UDF then UMP	
Intérim de Françoise de Veyrinas from 30 July until 5 August 2004
6		Jean-Luc Moudenc (born 19 July 1960 in Toulouse)	6 August 2004	16 March 2008	UMP	In the social field, it is practically doubling the Large City Project for Districts in Trouble, with priority being given to school renovation and the construction of crèches and neighborhood facilities. Rue Alsace-Lorraine is pedestrianised and a larger area is made in the city centre for bicycles. It establishes the provision of self-service bicycles in all the districts of Toulouse: VélôToulouse Culturally Moudenc inaugurated the renovation of the museum of natural history, the City of enlarged space, the House of Occitania. In 2007, he initiated the relocation of the Parc des Expositions and transformed the Ile du Ramier into an "island for recreation" and developed the banks of the Garonne for pedestrians and cyclists.
7		Pierre Cohen (born 20 March 1950 in Bizerte, Tunisia)	17 March 2008	3 April 2014	PS	
8		Jean-Luc Moudenc (born 19 July 1960 in Toulouse)	3 April 2014	incumbent	UMP then LR	

== See also ==
- Municipal council (France)
- Municipal elections in France
