= Pierre Baudis =

French politician

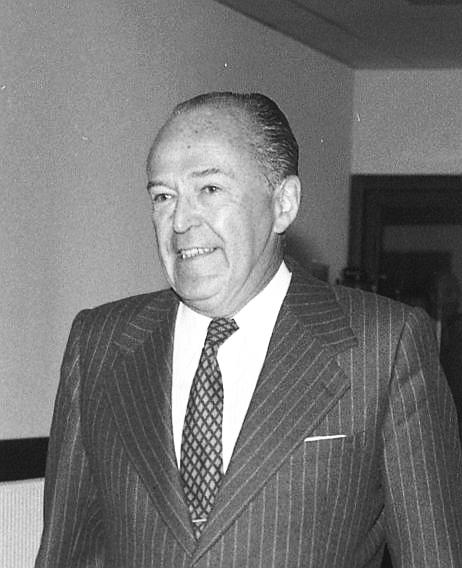
Pierre Baudis in March 1974.

Pierre Baudis (born 11 May 1916 in Decazeville, Aveyron); died 5 January 1997 in Toulouse, Haute-Garonne) was a French politician and mayor of Toulouse from 1971 to 1983.

== Biography ==
Pierre Baudis was the father of Dominique Baudis (himself mayor of Toulouse from 1983 to 2001, president of the CSA from 2001 to 2007, and Defender of Rights from 2011 to 2014). He is also the father of Chantal Baudis.

Elected deputy for Haute-Garonne in 1958 and re-elected in 1962, he sat in the Democratic Center group (Independents and MRP). He supported the candidacy of Jean Lecanuet during the presidential election of 1965.

In March 1967, he was beaten in the legislative elections by André Rousselet, a close collaborator of François Mitterrand. He will find his seat in June 1968 and will be related to the group of independent Republicans (the “Giscardiens”). Deputy mayor of Toulouse Louis Bazerque since 1959, he is responsible for the city's important social sector. In March 1971, he ran against the same Louis Bazerque and was elected in the second round with 58% of the votes. He was general councilor since 1961 and remained so until his death. Re-elected deputy in March 1973, he must face a strong offensive by the Socialists led by Alain Savary in March 1977. He wins in two of the three sectors of the city.

In March 1978, he was beaten in the legislative elections by the young socialist Gérard Bapt. He was a Member of the European Parliament for the term from 1979 to 1984.

In March 1983, he ceded the head of the list to his son Dominique, who was easily elected in his place.

He is buried in the Salonique cemetery in Toulouse.

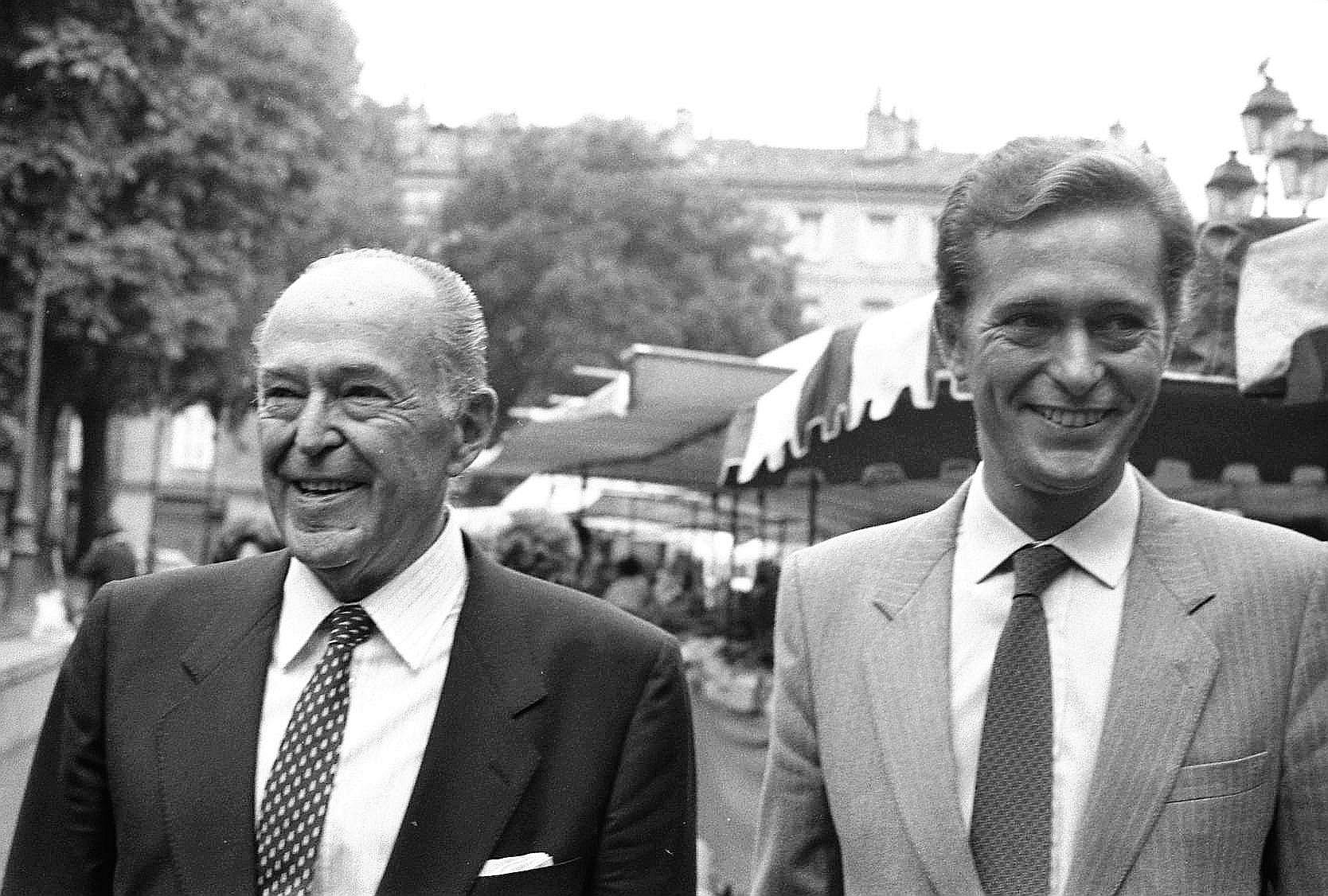
Pierre Baudis and his son Dominique in 1982.

== Mandates ==
- Deputy for Haute-Garonne: from 1958 to 1967, from 1968 to 1978
- Municipal councilor and deputy mayor (1959–1971)
- General Councilor of Haute-Garonne (1961–1997)
- Mayor of Toulouse: from 1971 to 1983
- Regional councilor of Midi-Pyrénées (1974–1984)
- Member of the European Parliament: from 1979 to 1984

== Tributes ==
In Toulouse, a street and a congress center bear his name.

== See also ==
- List of mayors of Toulouse
