= Laurence Arribagé =

French politician (born 1970)

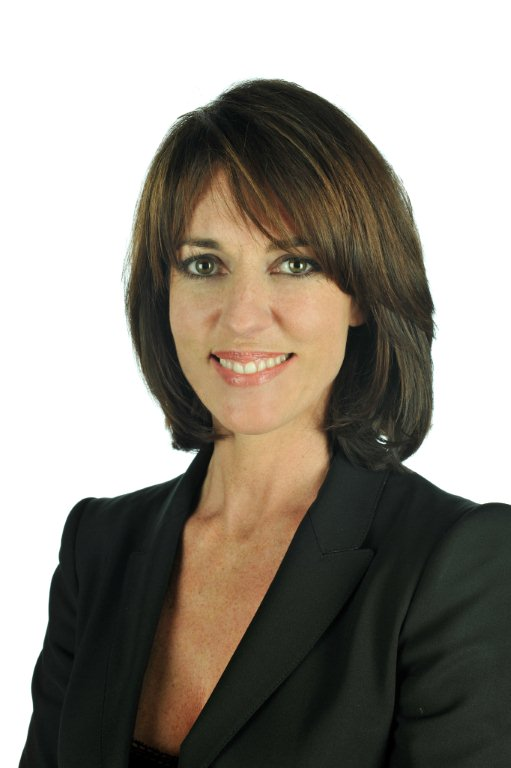

Deputy Mayor of Toulouse
- In office 4 April 2014 – 29 March 2024
- Mayor: Jean-Luc Moudenc
- Preceded by: Daniel Benyahia
- Succeeded by: Jean-Michel Lattes

Member of the National Assembly for Haute-Garonne's 3rd constituency
- In office 2 June 2014 – 20 June 2017
- Preceded by: Jean-Luc Moudenc
- Succeeded by: Corinne Vignon

Regional Councilor of Midi-Pyrénées
- In office 26 March 2010 – 12 June 2014

Personal details
- Born: 25 June 1970 (age 56) Albi, France
- Party: Horizons (2022–present)
- Other political affiliations: UMP (2002–2015); The Republicans (2015–2022)
- Spouse: Dominique Arribagé
- Education: Institut d'études politiques de Toulouse
- Alma mater: Toulouse 1 University Capitole
- Occupation: Politician; Communication advisor
- Website: laurencearribage.fr

Laurence Arribagé (25 May 1970) is a French politician and communications advisor. She is a member of the Union for a Popular Movement party. She served as member of Parliament from 2014 to 2017. She was deputy mayor of Toulouse from 2014 - 2024. She was also elected regional councilor of Midi-Pyrénées from 2010 to 2014. She was departmental secretary of the UMP federation then Les Républicains de la Haute-Garonne from 2011 to 2016.

== Biography ==
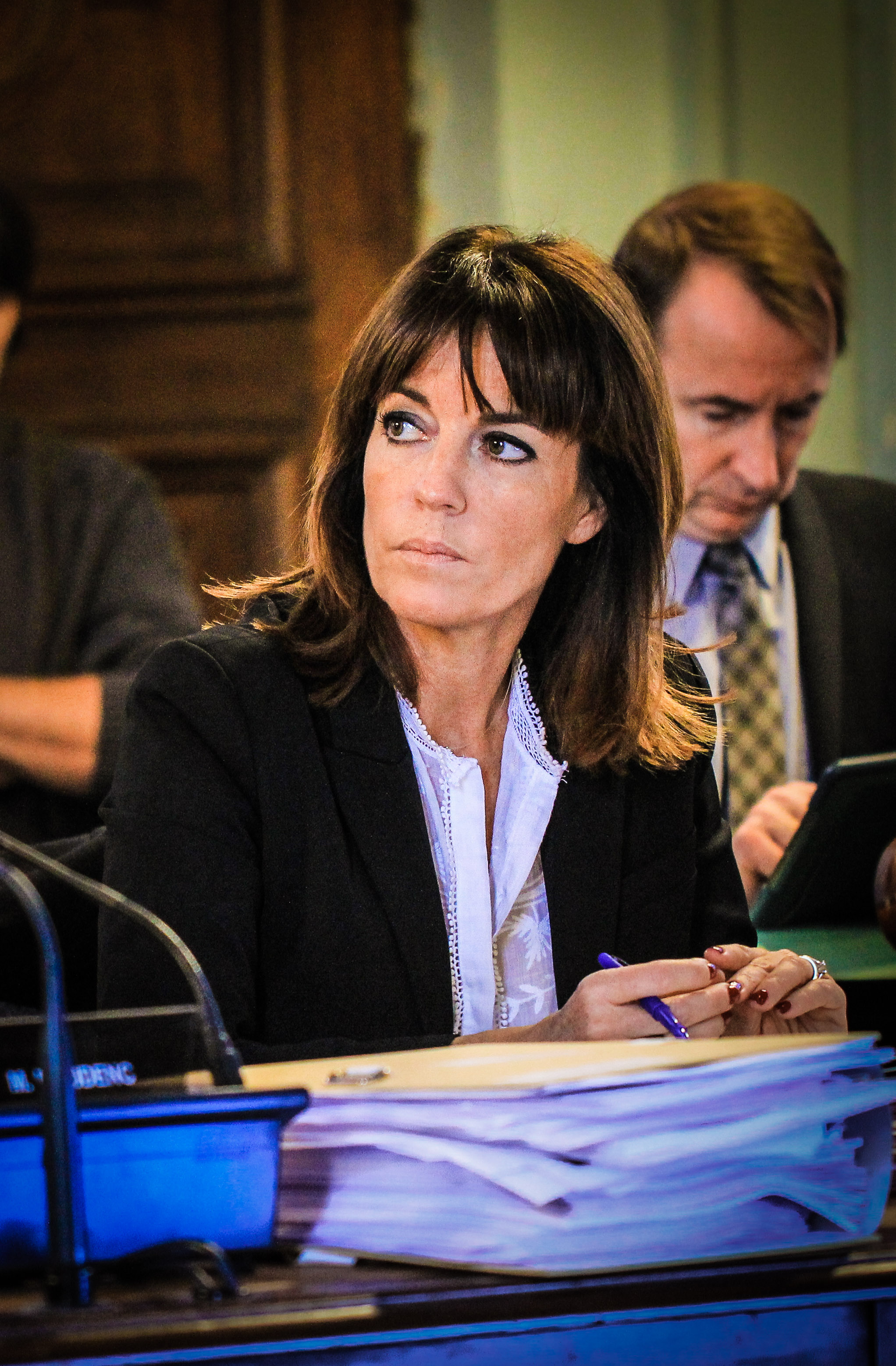
Arribagé in 2015

Laurence Arribagé was born in Albi, France in 1970. She is married to former footballer Dominique Arribagé and has children. She studied at Toulouse 1 University Capitole. For the 2017 legislative elections, she was standing in the third constituency of Haute-Garonne. She is a member of the national assembly's committee on cultural affairs and education. She was elected MP on 1 June 2014, Jean-Luc Moudenc becoming her deputy.

Political offices
Preceded by -	Deputy Mayor of Toulouse; 4 April 2014	Succeeded by -
Preceded by Jean-Luc Moudenc	Member of parliament 2 June 2014 – 20 June 2017	Succeeded by Corinne Vignon
Preceded by -	Regional Councilor of Midi-Pyrénées; 26 March 2010 – 12 June 2014	Succeeded by -
