= Camille Ournac =

French politician from Toulouse

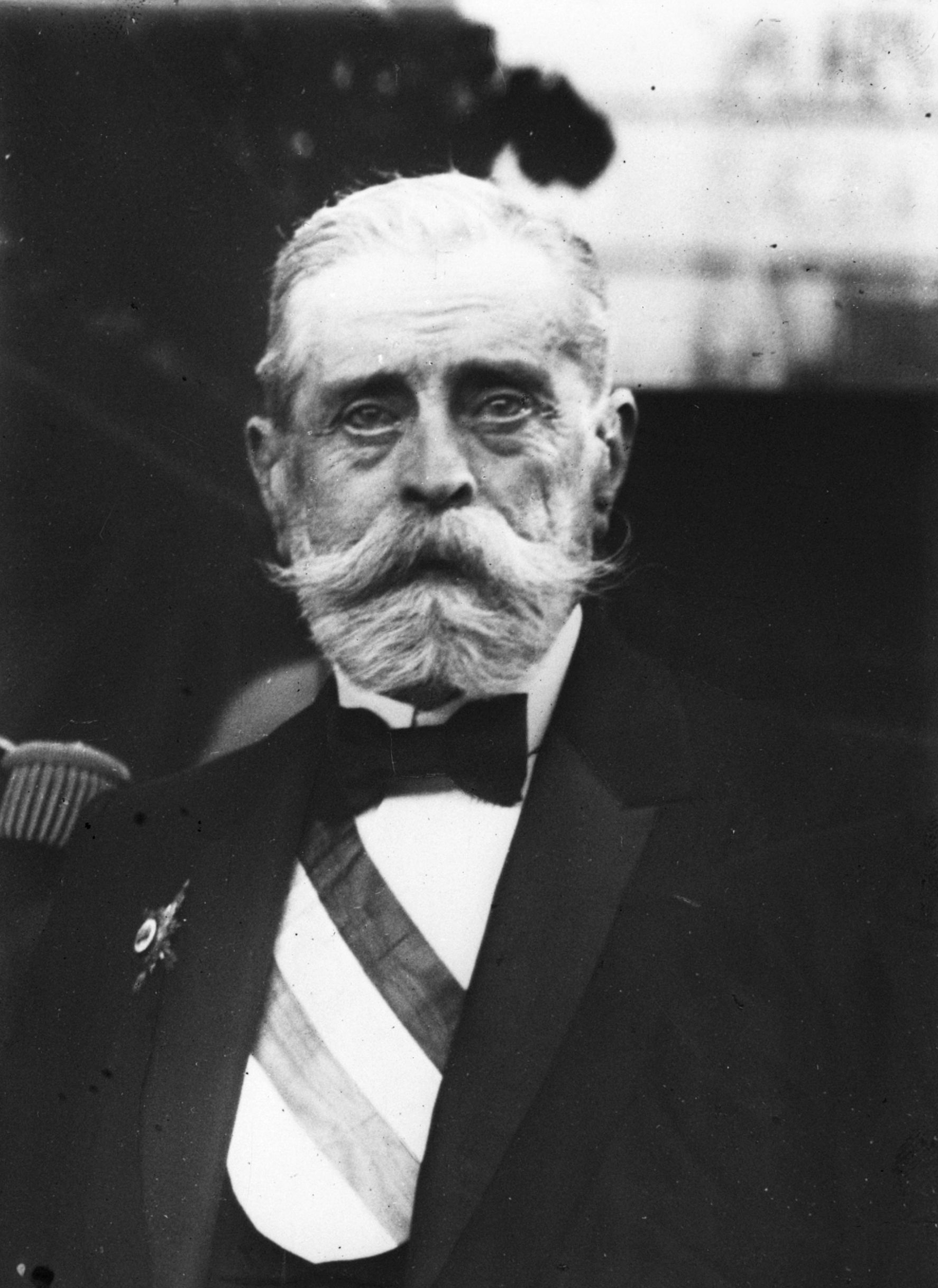
- Camille Ournac in 1914
- Born: Jean Joseph Hippolyte Camille; 31 August 1845; Toulouse, France
- Died: 24 January 1925 (aged 79); Toulouse, France
- Occupation: Politician
- Years active: 1888–1920

Mayor of Toulouse
- In office 1888–1902

Senator in French Third Republic
- In office 1897–1920

Camille Ournac (31 August 1845 – 24 February 1925) was a wine merchant, miller and French politician. In his political life, he was a member of the Departmental council, and socialist mayor of Toulouse where he initiated several reforms and improvements to the city. He later became senator for Haute-Garonne in the Third French Republic.

== Life ==
Born in Toulouse on 31 August 1845, Camille Ournac, became a wholesale wine merchant, a miller and then Conseil général of French Departments, Ournac was the first of a succession of radical socialist mayors of Toulouse who founded the labor exchange and set up the first horse-drawn streetcars in the city. His tenure was from 20 May 1888 until 12 October 1892.

Like his brother Henry, Ournac was a cartoonist, signing his works "Ka-Mill". He was made a knight of the Légion d'honneur in 1889. Ournac's son, Jean, died in Royan age thirty-six on 15 December 1911 while his father, Camille, was 79 years of age when he died on 24 January 1925 in Toulouse.

== Mayor of Toulouse ==
Elected on the list of radical and socialist republican union sponsored by La Dépêche du Midi, against the republican list where Josef Sirven appeared. He was elected on 15 May 1892, but on 6 October Ournac resigned with his deputies, Honoré Serres and Jean Jaurès. He was re-elected on the 9th and resigned a second time.

Excerpt from Ournac's Musée Saint-Raymond inaugural speech (translated from French):
The creation of this museum is essentially democratic in the highest sense of the word; And it is usefully, in my opinion, to work for the people, to teach him history by the eyes; It is to form his taste, to inculcate in him the love of the beautiful in all its forms, all things which make man better. (Note: La création de ce musée est une œuvre essentiellement démocratique dans le sens le plus élevé du mot; et c'est utilement, à mon avis, travailler pour le peuple, que de lui enseigner l'histoire par les yeux; c'est former son goût, que de lui inculquer l'amour du beau sous toutes ses formes, toutes choses qui rendent l'homme meilleur.)

Camille Ournac, mayor of Toulouse

By a municipal decree of 14 April 1891, under the direction of mayor Ournac Musée Saint-Raymond became a "museum of ancient and exotic decorative arts" in Toulouse and was inaugurated by him on 24 April 1892.

In 1892, Ournac decided to create the Salle des Illustres, a large gallery of works by Toulouse artists in the Capitole de Toulouse, now used as a reception hall. The state, which was responsible for half of the renovation costs, and the city, contested the list of artists who would participate in the work. The city's choice to use only artists of the school of Toulouse prevailed when this was decided on 20 January 1892. Artists whose work decorates the hall are Jean-Paul Laurens, Jean-Joseph Benjamin-Constant, Jean-André Rixens, Paul Gervais, Édouard Debat-Ponsan, Henri Rachou Paul Pujol and Henri-Jean Guillaume Martin.

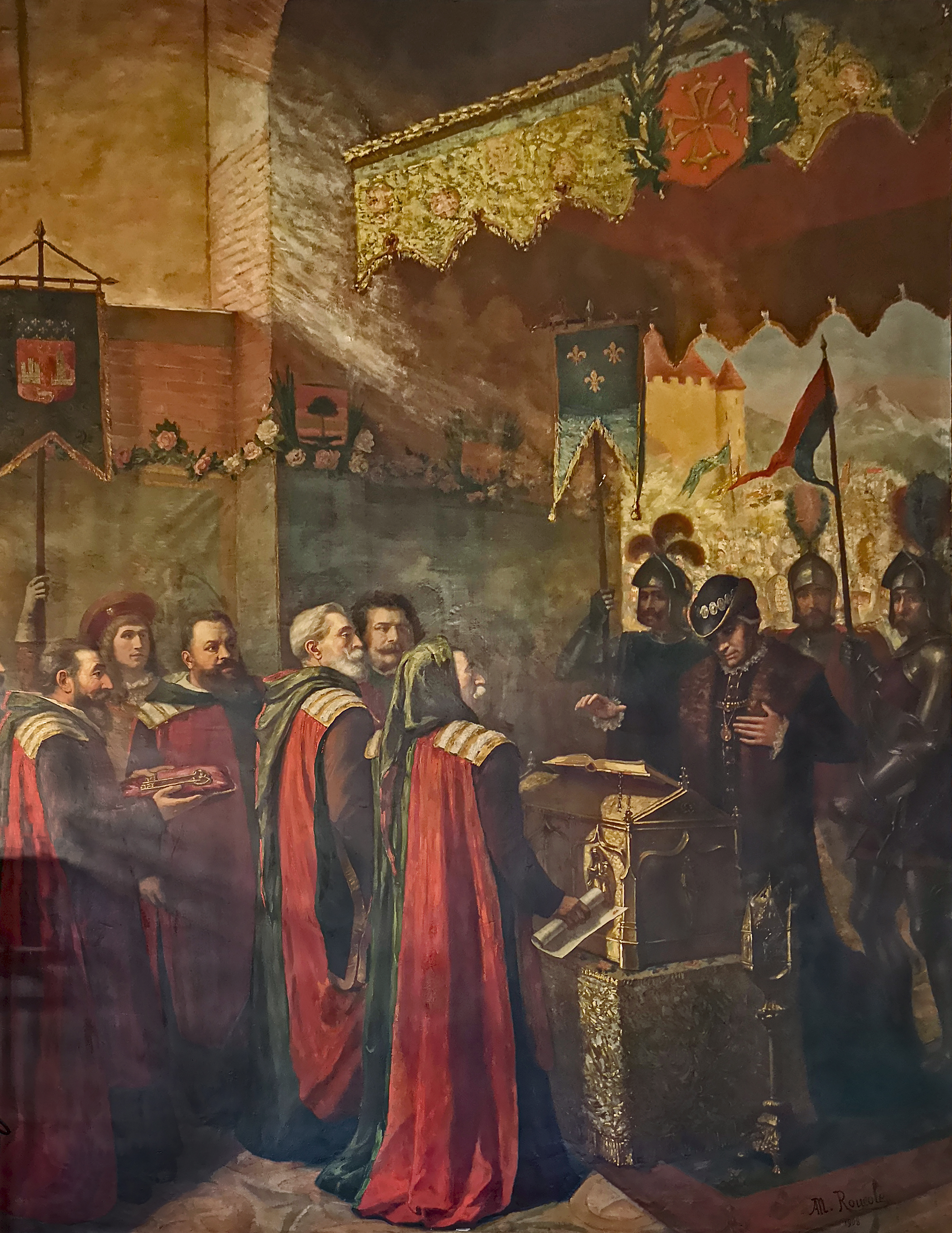
André Roucolle's Entrée de Louis XI à Toulouse uses several late 19th century politicians including Camille Ournac

The painting Entrée de Louis XI à Toulouse by André Roucolle, a local artist, illustrating Louis XI's visit to Toulouse in 1463 is the dominant work hanging in the council chamber. Roucolle uses the images of Ournac, along with Paul Feuga and Ournac's mayoral successor Honoré Serres, as attending figures, because of their involvement in deciding to create the Salle des Illustres using local artist's works.

Also in July 1892, Ournac inaugurated the new Bourse du Travail in Place Saint-Sernin.

== Senator ==
He was first elected as senator for Haute-Garonne in the Third Republic on 3 January 1897, and re-elected in the 1906 election, but in 1920 lost his seat. Ournac joined the French Democratic Left party and intervened on budgetary issues related to agriculture and was also a member of committees on finance, railways, initiative, local interest, and the economic organization of the nation in time of war. On 15 October 1915, Ournac introduced a motion protesting the German execution of Edith Cavell. It passed unanimously in the Senate.
