= Arnaud Simion =

French politician

Member of the French National Assembly for Haute-Garonne's 6th constituency
- Incumbent
- Assumed office 8 July 2024
- Preceded by: Monique Iborra

Personal details
- Born: 19 May 1968 (age 57) Castelsarrasin
- Party: Socialist

Arnaud Simion (born 19 May 1968) is a French politician from Socialist Party (PS). In the 2024 French legislative election, he was elected member of the National Assembly for Haute-Garonne's 6th constituency.

== Biography ==
Simion was a Socialist elected representative of the town of Colomiers in Haute-Garonne where he was first deputy mayor and departmental councilor of Haute-Garonne, elected representative of the Canton of Toulouse-7 since 2015, and since 2021 the fourth vice-president of the departmental council of Haute-Garonne in charge of local social action, solidarity houses and integration under the presidency of Sébastien Vincini, and fifth with the same portfolios from 2021 to 2022 under Georges Méric.

He became a deputy for the Haute-Garonne's 6th constituency under the colours of the Socialist Party (PS), and with the investiture of the New Popular Front during the legislative elections of 2024. He obtained 60.40% of the votes against Nadine Demange-Fierlej, the candidate of the National Rally, and thus succeeded Monique Iborra, who was deputy from 2007 to 2024 (LREM/RE).
