= Hadrien Clouet =

French politician (born 1991)

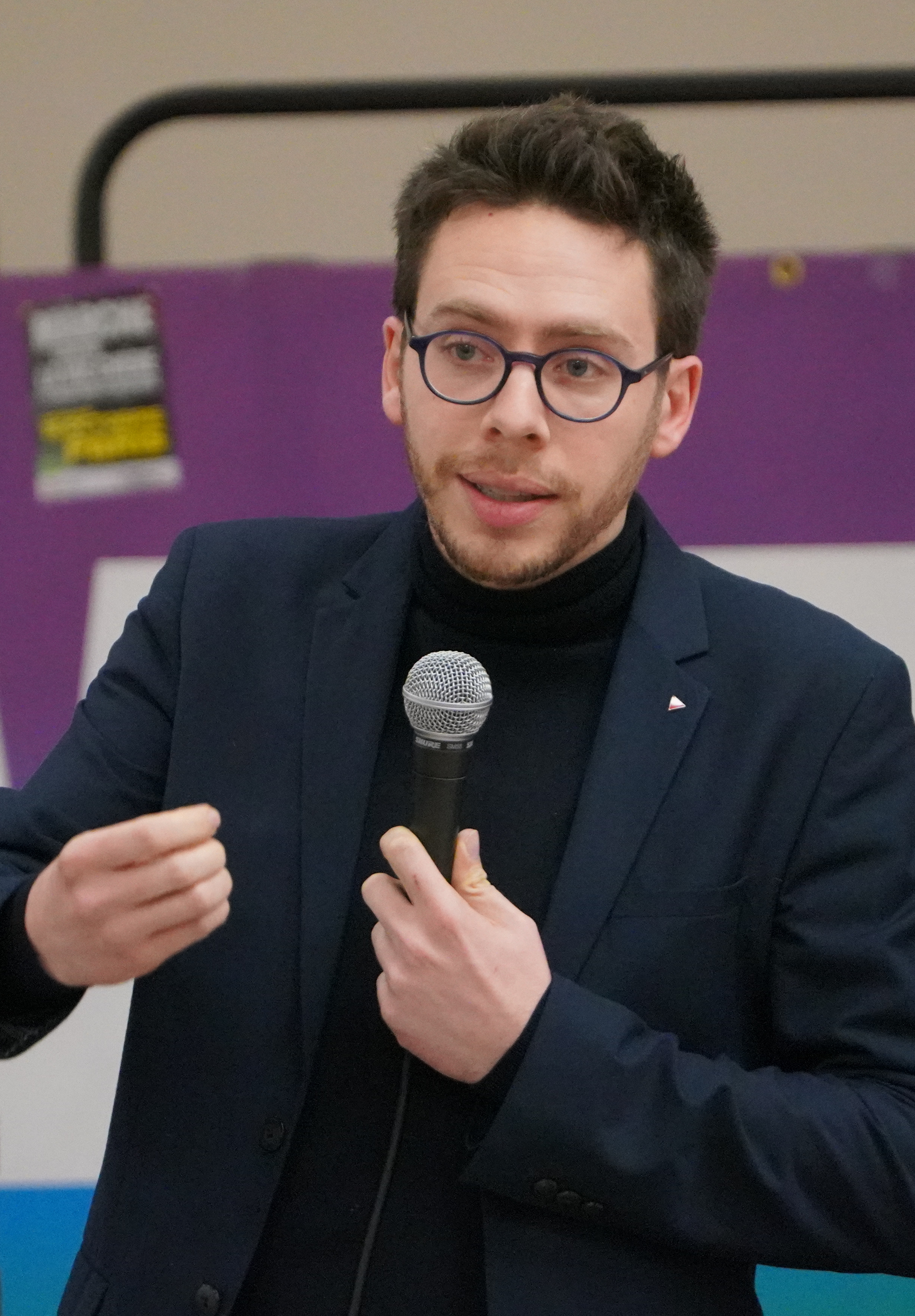
- Hadrien Clouet in 2023

Member of the National Assembly for Haute-Garonne's 1st constituency
- Incumbent
- Assumed office 22 June 2022
- Preceded by: Pierre Cabaré

Personal details
- Born: 13 July 1991 (age 35) Aix-en-Provence, France
- Party: La France Insoumise (since 2016)
- Other political affiliations: Left Party (2008-2016); Socialist Party (until 2008)
- Education: Sciences Po
- Profession: Sociologist

Hadrien Clouet (French pronunciation: [adʁijɛ̃ kluɛ]; born 13 July 1991) is a French politician of La France Insoumise (LFI) who has been representing Haute-Garonne's 1st constituency in the National Assembly since 2022.

== See also ==
- List of deputies of the 16th National Assembly of France
- List of deputies of the 17th National Assembly of France
