= Monique Iborra =

French politician

Deputy for Haute-Garonne's 6th constituency in the National Assembly of France
- In office 20 June 2007 – 9 June 2024
- Preceded by: Hélène Mignon
- Succeeded by: Arnaud Simion
- Parliamentary group: PS (2007-2017); Renaissance/LREM (2017 on)

Personal details
- Born: 8 March 1945 (age 81) Maison-Carrée, Algeria

Monique Iborra (born 8 March 1945 in Maison-Carrée, Algeria) is a member of the National Assembly of France. She represented the Haute-Garonne department. In 2017 she switched from the Socialist Party (PS) to Renaissance (RE).

== Political career ==
In parliament, Iborra serves as member of the Committee on Social Affairs. In 2019, she unsuccessfully ran for the post of the committee's chair.

In 2019, French farmers protesting against the Comprehensive Economic and Trade Agreement (CETA) between Canada and the European Union dumped manure overnight outside Iborra's office; the National Federation of Agricultural Holders' Unions (FDSEA) later claimed responsibility for the vandalism.

In 2022, Iborra was re-elected by just 4 votes in the second round of the legislative elections.

== Other activities ==
- Haut Conseil de la famille, de l'enfance et de l'âge (HCFEA), Member
