= Dominique Arribagé =

French footballer and manager (born 1971)

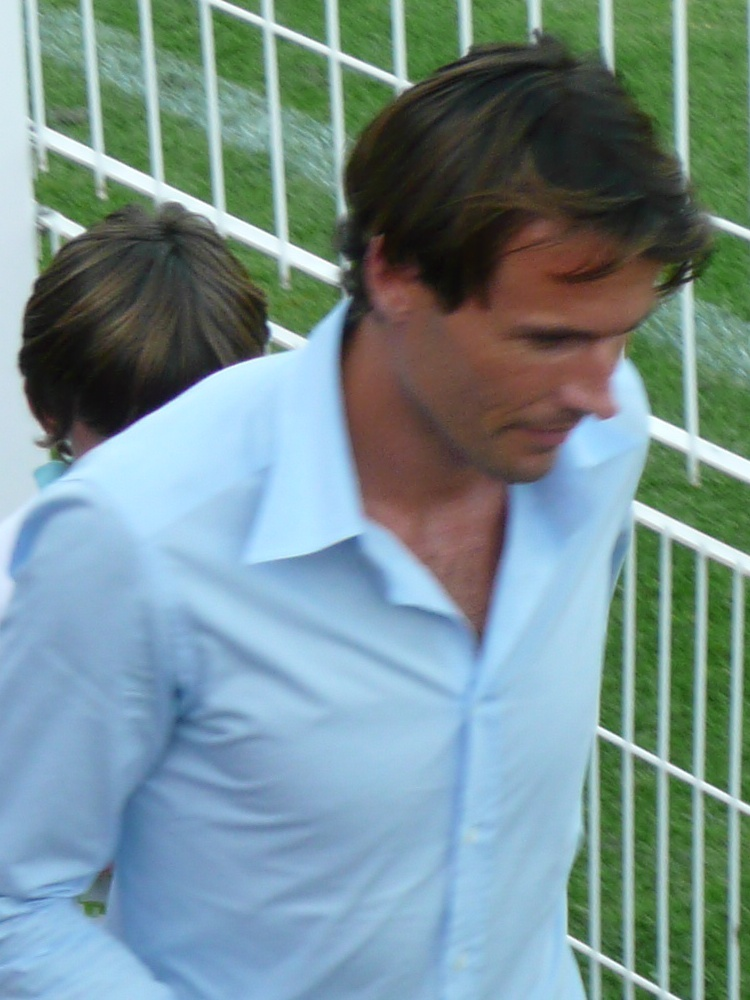
- Arribagé in 2008

Personal information
- Date of birth: 11 May 1971 (age 55)
- Place of birth: Suresnes, France
- Height: 1.87 m (6 ft 2 in)
- Position: Defender

Senior career*
Years	Team	Apps	(Gls)
1991–1992	Muret		
1992–1998	Toulouse	181	(8)
1998–2004	Rennes	166	(14)
2004–2008	Toulouse	110	(4)
Total		457	(26)

Managerial career
- 2015–2016: Toulouse
- * Club domestic league appearances and goals

Dominique Arribagé (born 11 May 1971) is a French football manager and former player who most recently was the manager of Toulouse in Ligue 1.

== Career ==
Arribagé played for Toulouse for ten seasons, appearing in 334 official matches making his the club's all-time leader.

== Personal life ==
Arribagé is married to politician Laurence Arribagé.
