= Dominique Baudis =

French ombudsman and politician

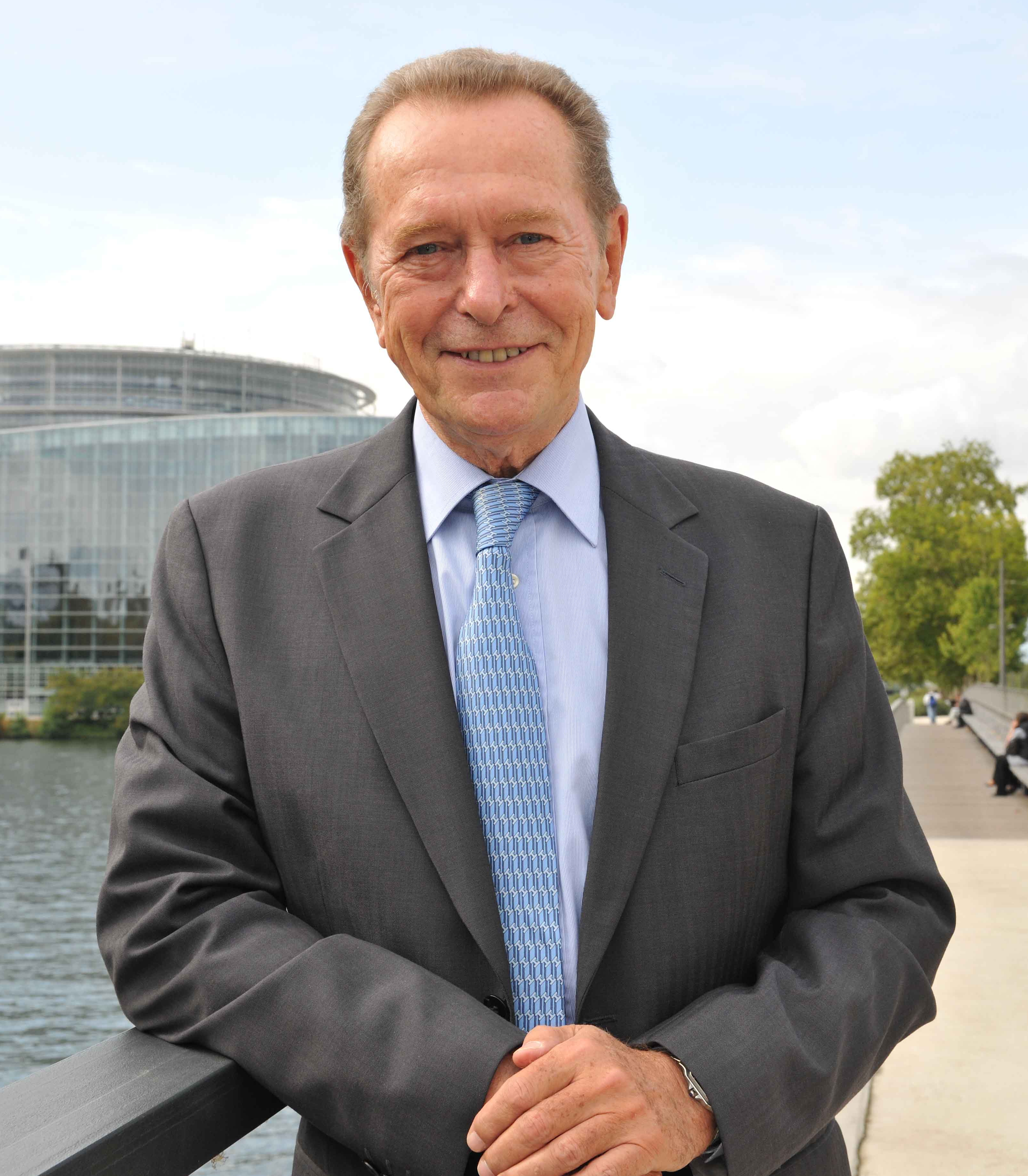
- Dominique Baudis in 2009

Defender of Rights
- In office 22 June 2011 – 10 April 2014
- President: Nicolas Sarkozy; François Hollande
- Preceded by: Jean-Paul Delevoye
- Succeeded by: Jacques Toubon

Mayor of Toulouse
- In office 11 March 1983 – 24 January 2001
- Preceded by: Pierre Baudis
- Succeeded by: Philippe Douste-Blazy

Member of the National Assembly for Haute-Garonne's 1st constituency
- In office 1 June 1997 – 24 January 2001
- Preceded by: Jean-Claude Paix
- Succeeded by: Philippe Douste-Blazy

Personal details
- Born: 14 April 1947 Paris, France
- Died: 10 April 2014 (aged 66) Paris, France
- Party: UMP
- Education: Lycée Carnot
- Alma mater: Sciences Po

Dominique Baudis (French: [bodi]; 14 April 1947 – 10 April 2014) was the French Defender of Rights (ombudsman). Formerly a journalist, politician and mayor of Toulouse, he had been a member of Liberal Democracy and later of the leading centre-right Union for a Popular Movement.

== Biography ==
=== Early life ===
Dominique Baudis was born in Paris. He was educated at Sciences Po where he graduated in 1968. His father, Pierre Baudis, served as the mayor of Toulouse.

=== Career ===
A journalist, he was a foreign correspondent for TF1 in the Middle East from 1976 to 1977. He was news anchor on TF1 from 1977 to 1980 and from 1980 to 1982 on FR3.

A member of the CDS (a member of the centre-right UDF, he was elected to replace his father, Pierre Baudis as mayor of Toulouse in the 1983 French municipal elections. In 1984, he was elected to the European Parliament, in 1986 he became President of the Regional Council of the Midi-Pyrénées, also in 1986 he was elected to the French National Assembly representing Haute-Garonne's 1st constituency. He won re-election in 1988, 1993 and 1997.

He led the UDF-RPR list in the 1994 European election.

In 2001, Jacques Chirac appointed him president of the Conseil supérieur de l'audiovisuel (CSA), a post which he held until 2007, when Chirac appointed him president of the Arab World Institute.

In 2009, the UMP nominated him to lead the UMP list in the South-West for the 2009 European election. His list won 26.89% and he was elected to the European Parliament for a third time. For the first time, the Presidential Majority (meaning all the parties gathered around Nicolas Sarkozy) scored four seats in the European Parliament, two more than the Socialist Party, French South-West's leading force. In some urban areas, such as Toulouse, Bordeaux, Bayonne and Montpellier, he scored more than 30%.

In July 2009, he was elected vice-president of the Commission of Foreign Affairs of the European Parliament and in November 2009 he was named rapporteur on the Association Agreement with Syria.

Baudis was nominated by the prime minister to the new office of Defender of Rights, essentially an ombudsman role, and was appointed by the Council of State with effect from July 2011.
