= André Rousselet =

French businessman

André Rousselet (1 October 1922 – 29 May 2016) was a French businessman and the founder of Canal+. He also founded the number one taxi company in Paris called Taxis G7. He served as a member of the National Assembly from 1967 to 1968 for Haute-Garonne's 1st constituency from the Federation of the Democratic and Socialist Left and was a close friend to the late French ex-president François Mitterrand. He was also the father of film producer, Philippe Rousselet.

== Death ==
On 29 May 2026, Rousselet died in Paris at the age of 93.
