= Pierre Cohen =

French politician

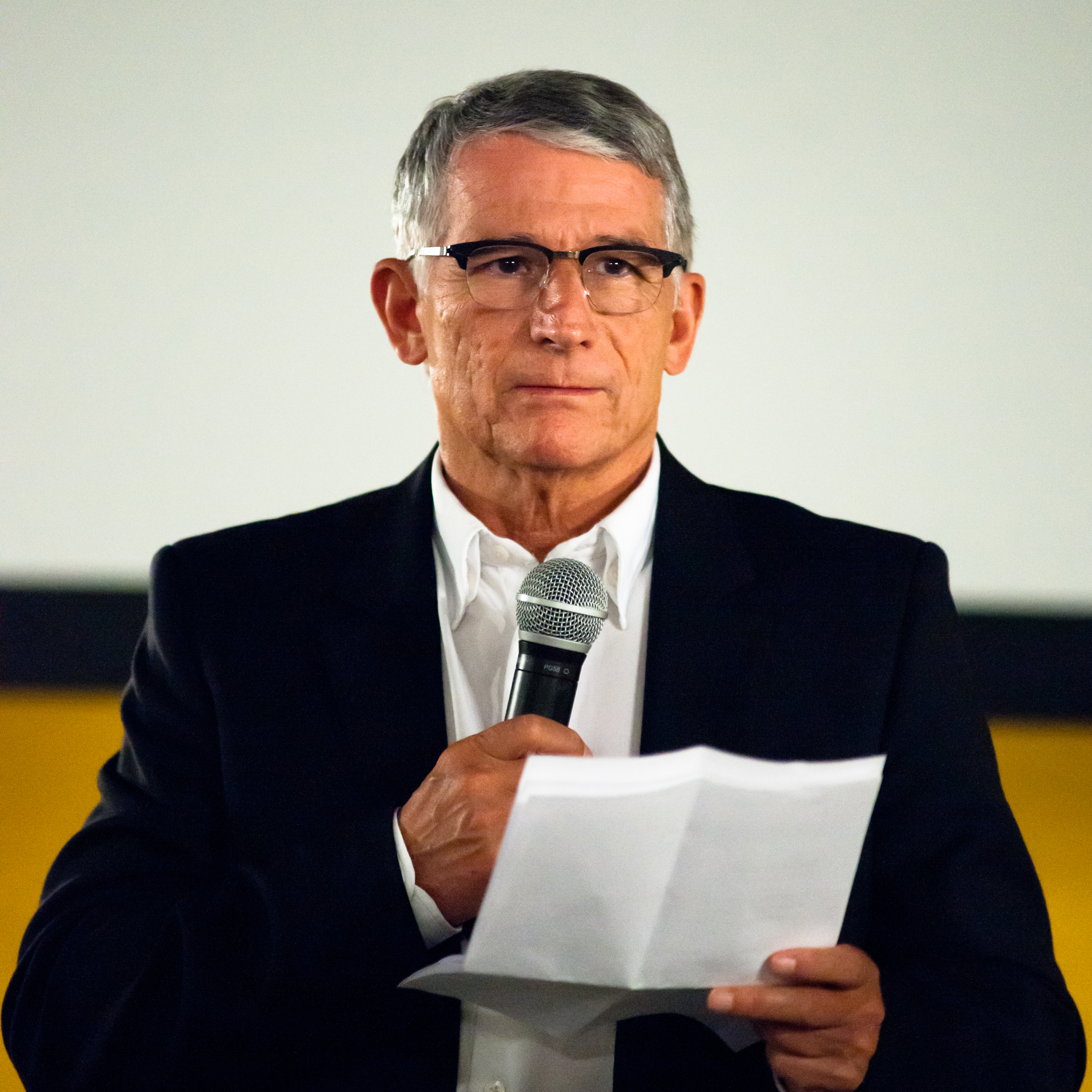
- Pierre Cohen in 2010

Mayor of Toulouse
- In office 21 March 2008 – 4 April 2014
- Preceded by: Jean-Luc Moudenc
- Succeeded by: Jean-Luc Moudenc

Member of the National Assembly for Haute-Garonne's 3rd constituency
- In office 12 June 1997 – 19 June 2012
- Preceded by: Serge Didier
- Succeeded by: Jean-Luc Moudenc

Personal details
- Born: 20 March 1950 (age 76) Bizerte, Tunisia
- Party: Socialist Party; Génération.s
- Education: Paul Sabatier University

Pierre Cohen (born 20 March 1950) is a member of the National Assembly of France. He represents the Haute-Garonne department, and is a member of the Socialist, Radical, Citizen and Miscellaneous Left group.

== Early life ==
Cohen was born in Bizerte, a town in North Tunisia to a Tunisian Jewish father and French Catholic mother.

== Political career ==
In the 2008 French municipal elections, Cohen became mayor of Toulouse when he narrowly defeated UMP incumbent Jean-Luc Moudenc. However, at the next elections in 2014, Moudenc defeated Cohen in a rematch to re-take the job.

Ahead of the Socialist Party's 2017 primaries, Cohen endorsed Benoît Hamon as the party's candidate for the presidential election later that year.

== See also ==
Media related to Pierre Cohen at Wikimedia Commons
