= Jean-François Mattéi =

French philosopher

- Mattéi in 1971
- Born: 9 March 1941; Oran, French Algeria
- Died: 24 March 2014 (aged 73)

Philosophical work
- Era: Contemporary philosophy
- Region: Western philosophy

Jean-François Mattéi (French: [ma.te.i]; 9 March 1941 – 24 March 2014) was a French philosopher and professor of Greek philosophy and political philosophy at the University of Nice.
