= Pierre Cabaré =

French politician (born 1957)

Pierre Cabaré (French pronunciation: [pjɛʁ kabaʁe]; born 12 December 1957) is a French dental technician and politician of La République En Marche! (LREM) who was elected as a member of the French National Assembly in the 2017 French legislative election, representing Haute-Garonne's 1st constituency.

In parliament, Cabaré served on the Committee on Foreign Affairs. In addition to his committee assignments, he is part of the French-Kazakh Parliamentary Friendship Group, the French-Mongolian Parliamentary Friendship Group and the French-Slovenian Parliamentary Friendship Group. In 2020, Cabaré joined En commun (EC), a group within LREM led by Barbara Pompili.

He stood down at the 2022 French legislative election, and was succeeded by Hadrien Clouet from La France Insoumise.

== See also ==
- 2017 French legislative election
