= Jean-Luc Moudenc =

French politician

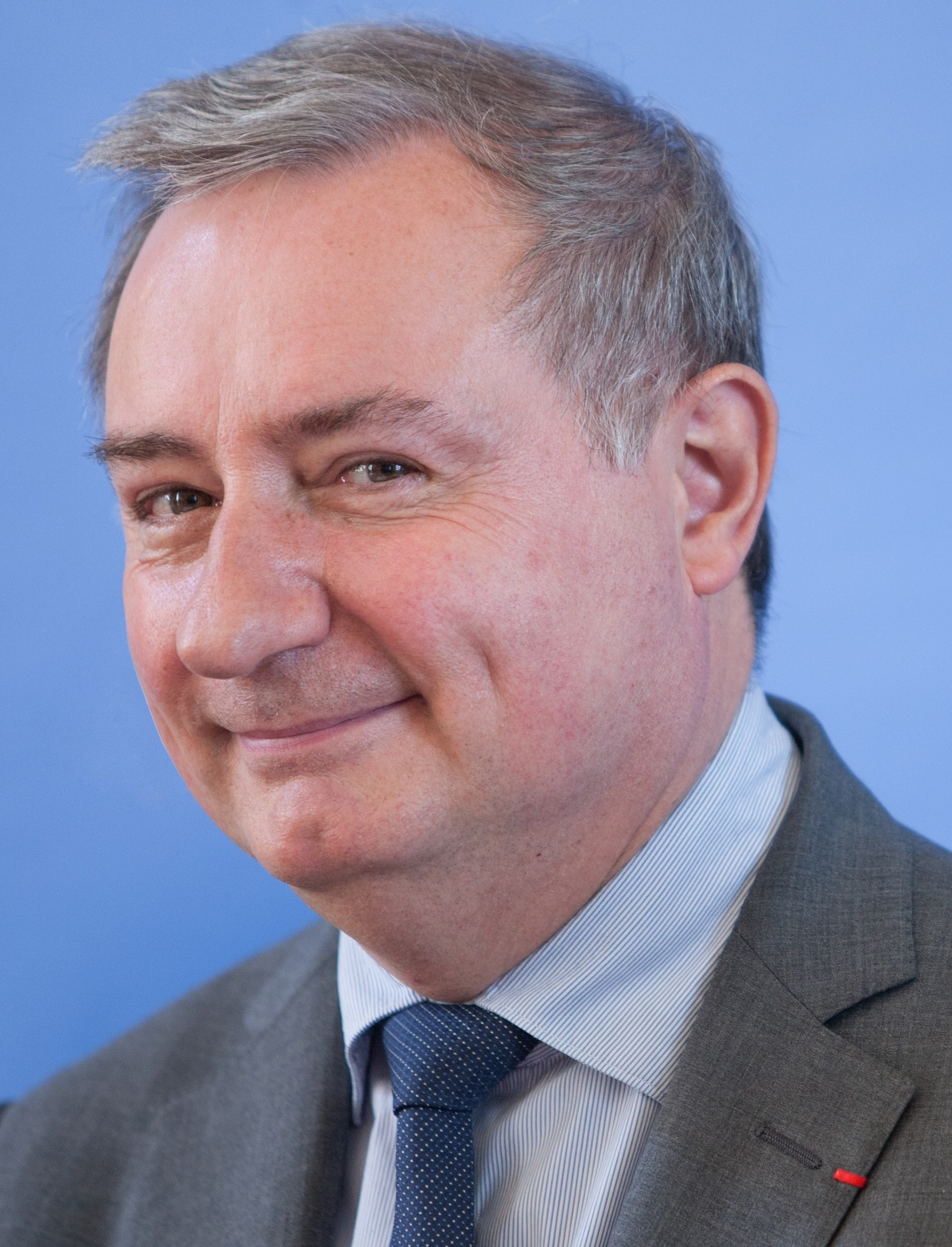
- Moudenc in 2016

Mayor of Toulouse
- Incumbent
- Assumed office 4 April 2014
- Preceded by: Pierre Cohen
- In office 6 May 2004 – 21 March 2008
- Preceded by: Philippe Douste-Blazy
- Succeeded by: Pierre Cohen

Member of the National Assembly for Haute-Garonne's 3rd constituency
- In office 20 June 2012 – 10 April 2014
- Preceded by: Pierre Cohen
- Succeeded by: Laurence Arribagé

Personal details
- Born: 19 July 1960 (age 66) Toulouse, France
- Party: Independent (since 2022)
- Other political affiliations: UDF (1977–2002); UMP (2002–2015); LR (2015–2022)
- Spouse: Blandine Moudenc
- Children: 2
- Education: Toulouse 1 University Capitole

Jean-Luc Moudenc (French: [ʒɑ̃ lyk mudɛ̃k]; Occitan: Joan Luc Modenc [dʒuˈan ˈlyk muˈðeŋk]; born 19 July 1960) is a French politician serving as Mayor of Toulouse since 2014, previously holding the office from 2004 to 2008. A member of The Republicans, he was defeated for reelection in 2008 by Pierre Cohen, candidate of the Socialist Party. He defeated Cohen in a rematch in 2014.

== Biography ==
=== Career ===
Born in Toulouse, Moudenc graduated from Toulouse 1 University Capitole in 1984. He worked as a journalist before entering local politics. He became a municipal councillor in 1987, before entering the Regional Council of Midi-Pyrénées in 1992, where he stayed until 2004. He also was General Councillor of Haute-Garonne from 1994 to 2008 for the canton of Toulouse-9.

After the elevation of Mayor Philippe Douste-Blazy to the position Minister of Health, an interim officeholder was appointed in the person of Françoise de Veyrinas. Moudenc succeeded her as Mayor of Toulouse. He was defeated in the 2008 municipal election but retook the position in the 2014 municipal election; he has also been President of Toulouse Métropole since 24 April 2014. From 2012 to 2014, he served as the member of the National Assembly for the third constituency of Haute-Garonne. In that capacity, he succeeded Pierre Cohen, who did not file a candidacy. Moudenc is standing for reelection in the 2020 municipal election with the support of Les Républicains and La République En Marche! (REM).

In March 2026, Jean-Luc Moudenc stated, "Mélenchonism is not just one political family of the Left among others. It represents a break with the Republic. LFI is a deadly and dangerous poison. And I believe there was a reflex to protect democracy against this political movement—a reflex that stemmed from extremely diverse political persuasions".

=== Personal life ===
Moudenc is married and has two children.

== See also ==
- List of mayors of Toulouse
- 2012 French legislative election

Political offices
Preceded by Philippe Douste-Blazy	Mayor of Toulouse; 2004–2008	Succeeded by Pierre Cohen
Preceded by Pierre Cohen	Mayor of Toulouse; 2014–present	Incumbent
