= Venus of Martres =

Sculpture fragment of Venus

Head of Venus Ra 52
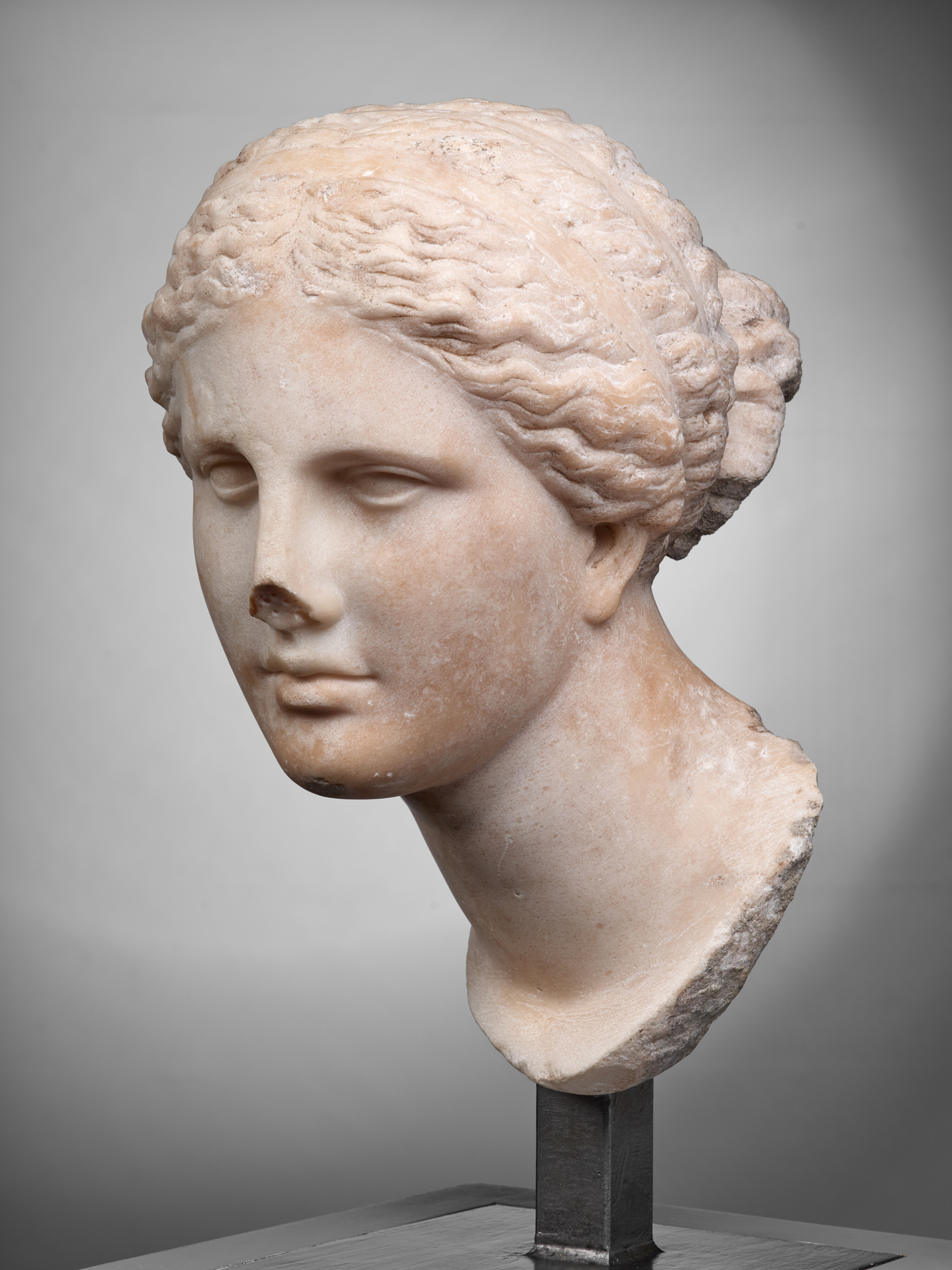
- Year: c. 1st century (Julian)
- Dimensions: 40 cm (16 in) × 24 cm (9.4 in) × 31 cm (12 in)
- Identifiers: Joconde work ID: 05630003797

The Venus of Martres is a sculpture fragment from an antique replica of the Aphrodite of Knidos. The replica was made around the first century of the common era. It is on display at Musée Saint-Raymond in Toulouse, France.

== History ==
The Venus of Martres was discovered in 1826 at Chiragan villa in Martres-Tolosane. It is currently on display on the first floor of Musée Saint-Raymond as exhibit Ra 52 (formerly Inv. 30328).

== Description ==
The Venus of Martres consists of a marble head in good general condition, although the tip of the nose is damaged. The shape of the neck indicates it might have been part of a bust or of a full-size statue. The hair is held in place by a ribbon that circles the head twice and shapes it into a bun. The face is slightly asymmetrical.

Vénus de Martres (de face), Musée Saint-Raymond

In his 1828 catalogue Alexandre Dumège identifies the fragment as representing Venus:

Imitation of the greatest perfection that nature produced, and ideal beauty itself, could not depict in more admirable forms this goddess whom Lucretius named delight of men and gods

In 1865, Ernest Roschach instead identifies it to a depiction of Diana:

It might as well be seen as Diana. It even seems that the proud beauty of the face and the energic development of the neck muscles would rather justify this attribution and hint at the chaste goddess, accustomed to running in the woods and take deep inbreaths of the fotrifying air of the mountains.

== Exhibitions ==
- Musées en balade, Musée archéologique d'Eauze, November–December 1997

== Bibliography ==
- Conservation du musée Saint-Raymond. Dossier d'œuvre Ra 52 (in French). Toulouse.
- L'essentiel des collections. Musée Saint-Raymond, musée des antiques de Toulouse (in French). Toulouse: Mairie de Toulouse. 2011. pp. 32–33. ISBN 978-2-909454-31-3.
- Rachou, Henri (1912). Catalogue des collections de sculpture et d'épigraphie du Musée de Toulouse (in French). Toulouse. p. n°52.
- Espérandieu, Émile (1908). Recueil général des bas-reliefs de la Gaule romaine (in French). Paris. p. volume II, n°902.
- Roschach, Ernest (1865). Musée de Toulouse. Catalogue des antiquités et objets d'art (in French). Toulouse. p. n°52.
- Dumège, Alexandre (1835). Description du musée des Antiques de Toulouse (in French). Toulouse. p. 79 n°140.
- Dumège, Alexandre (1828). Notice des monuments antiques et des objets de sculpture moderne conservés dans le Musée de Toulouse (in French). Toulouse. pp. 30–31 n°60.
