= Raymond of Toulouse =

Raymond of Toulouse may refer to:

Raymond I, Count of Toulouse (died 865), Count of Limoges, Rouergue, Quercy, Toulouse and Albi
Raymond II, Count of Toulouse (died 924), Count of Toulouse, Nîmes, and Albi
Raymond III, Count of Toulouse (died 978), Count of Toulouse, Nîmes, and Albi
Raymond IV, Count of Toulouse, a.k.a. Raymond of St Gilles (c. 1041 or 1042 – 1105), Count of Toulouse, Duke of Narbonne, Margrave of Provence and a leader of the First Crusade
Raymond of Toulouse (saint) (died 1118), Saint, native of Toulouse
Raymond V of Toulouse (1134–1194), count of Toulouse
Raymond VI, Count of Toulouse (1156–1222), count of Toulouse and marquis of Provence
Raymond VII, Count of Toulouse (1197–1249), Count of Toulouse, Duke of Narbonne and Marquis of Provence
