= Musée Saint-Raymond =

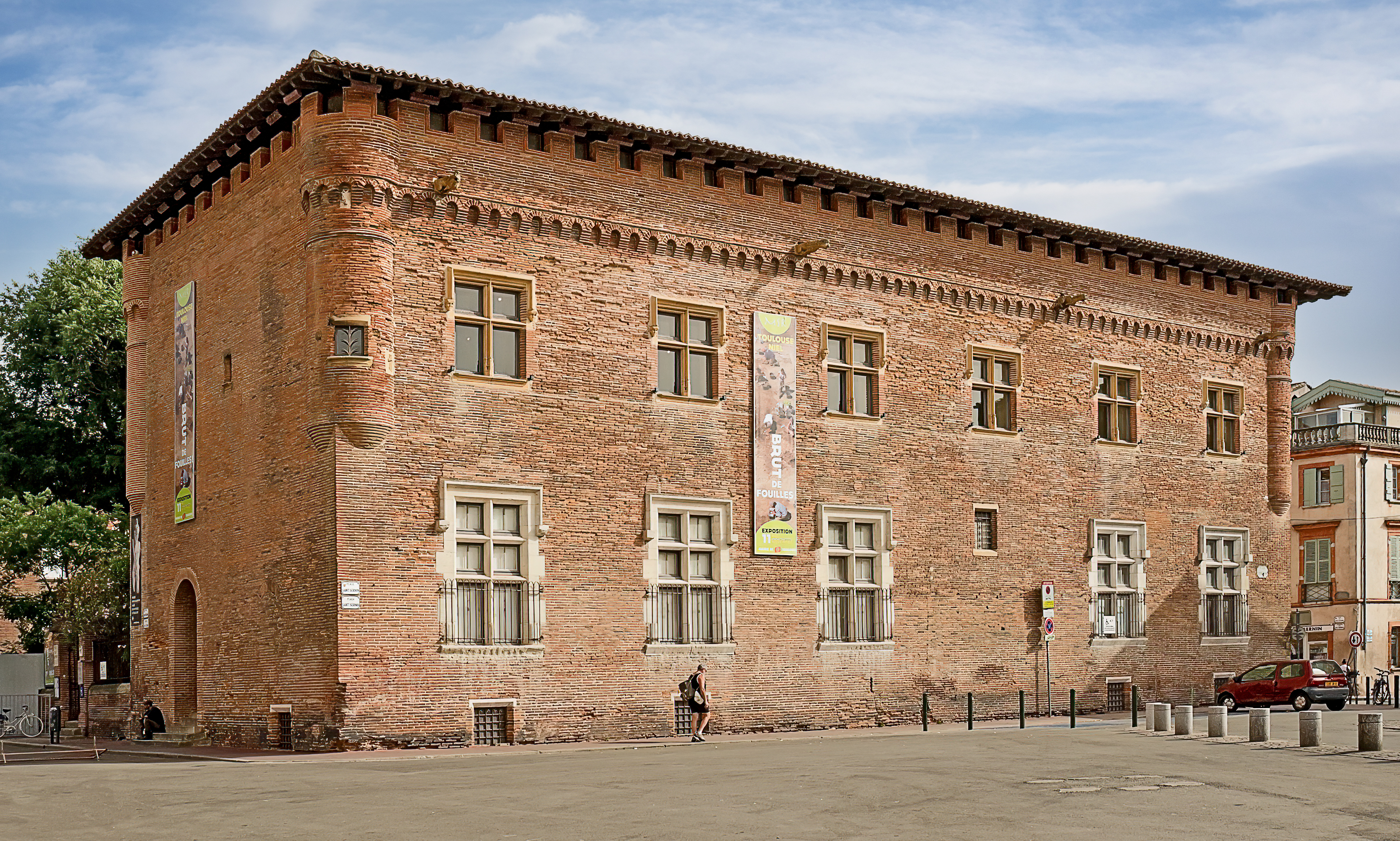
- Saint-Raymond Museum

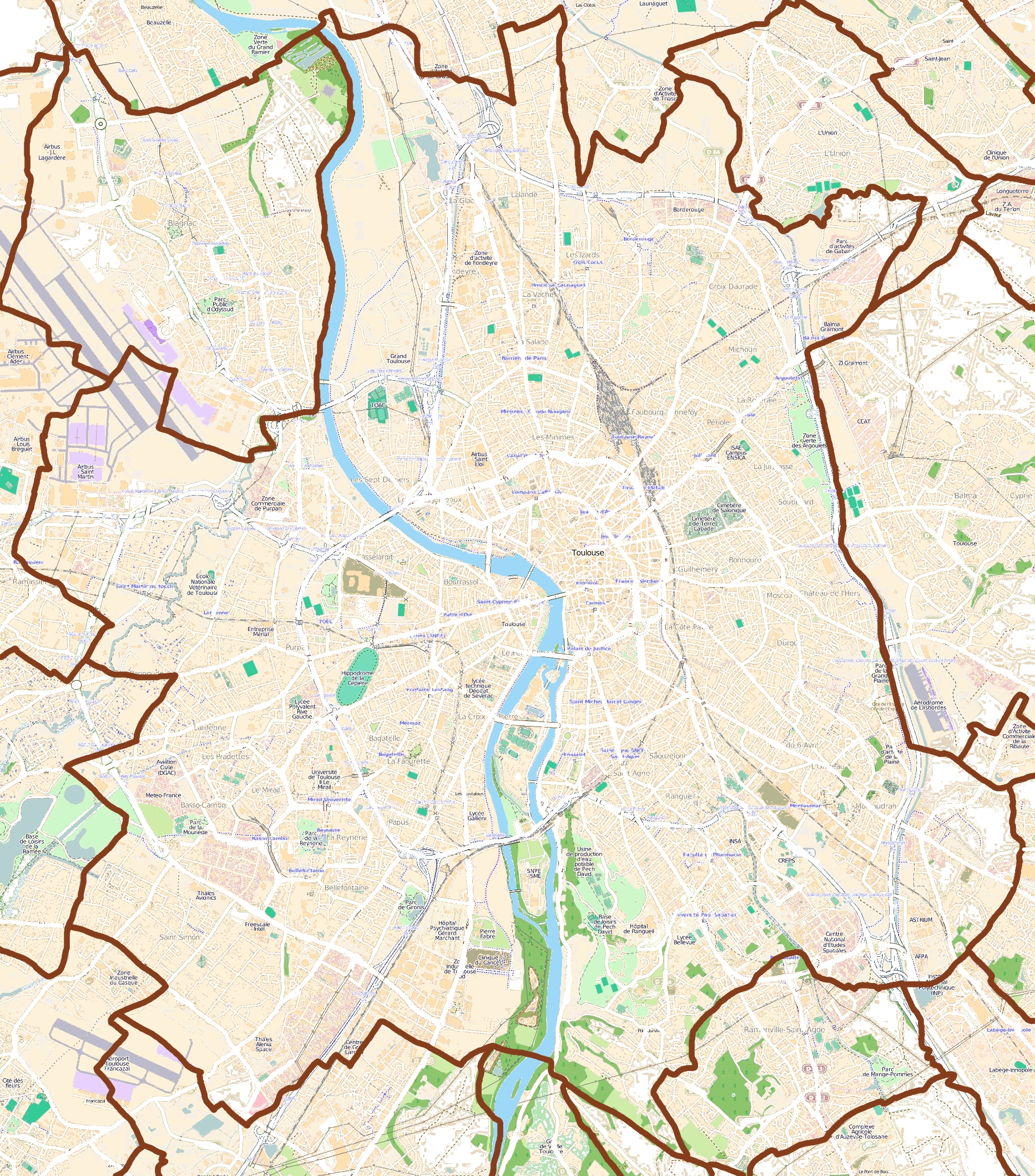
- Location within Toulouse
- Coordinates: 43°36′28″N 1°26′28″E
- Type: Art museum, archeological museum, historic site
- Curator: Laure Barthet
- Website: saintraymond.toulouse.fr

Musée Saint-Raymond (in English, Saint-Raymond museum; Occitan: Musèu Sant-Raimond) is the archeological museum of Toulouse, France, opened in 1892. The site originally was a necropolis, and in later constructions was a hospital for the poor and pilgrims, prison, student residence, stables, barracks and presbytery, eventually becoming a museum in 1891. It is housed in the former Saint-Raymond university college dating from the sixteenth century that borders Basilica of Saint-Sernin.

The building has been renovated and reconstructed several times. It preserves and exhibits archaeological collections from protohistory to the early Middle Ages, mainly from the Celtic, Roman and early Christian periods, much from the Toulouse region.

== History of the building ==
Originally a Christian necropolis dating from the 4th century was located here and stretched on either side of the Roman road close to the Basilica of Saint-Sernin.

Between 1075 and 1080, on the site of the present building was a hospital for the poor and for pilgrims travelling the Way of St. James on the French Way from Arles via Toulouse, founded by Raymond Gayrard and financed by the Count of Toulouse. By the 13th century, at the time the University of Toulouse was created the house had been acquired by the inquisitor Bernard de Caux, who used it as a prison for heretics. In 1249, the inquisitor offered the house to the abbot of Saint-Sernin in gratitude for his services to the defence of the faith, specifying that the College of Saint-Raymond should be reserved for poor students, as recorded in a 1250 act. The college continued in that purpose until the French Revolution.

After a great fire, at the end of the 13th century, Martin de Saint-André, bishop of Carcassonne, rebuilt on the same site. The current building, dating to 1523, was the work of the mason Louis Privat, who would later build the Hôtel de Bernuy for a rich woad merchant, Jean de Bernuy. It was financed in part by Martin de Saint-André (fr), prior of the college and his father, Pierre de Saint-André (fr).

The city of Toulouse bought the building in 1836 to use for a variety of functions, such as stables and barracks. In 1852–1853, during the redevelopment of the Place Saint-Sernin, it was the only building to escape demolition, due to the intervention of Alexandre Du Mège, Prosper Mérimée and Eugène Viollet-le-Duc.

Between 1868 and 1871, it was restored by Eugene Viollet-le-Duc, who removed the remains of the demolished chapel and built a fourth corner turret, added two interior walls and numerous crenellated chimneys that accented the medieval appearance of the structure. Viollet-le-Duc also built a neo-gothic house in the old courtyard of the college, that became a garden. The building then served as a presbytery to the Saint-Sernin Basilica until 1890.

It is one of the rare surviving examples of Toulouse university architecture from the late Middle Ages.

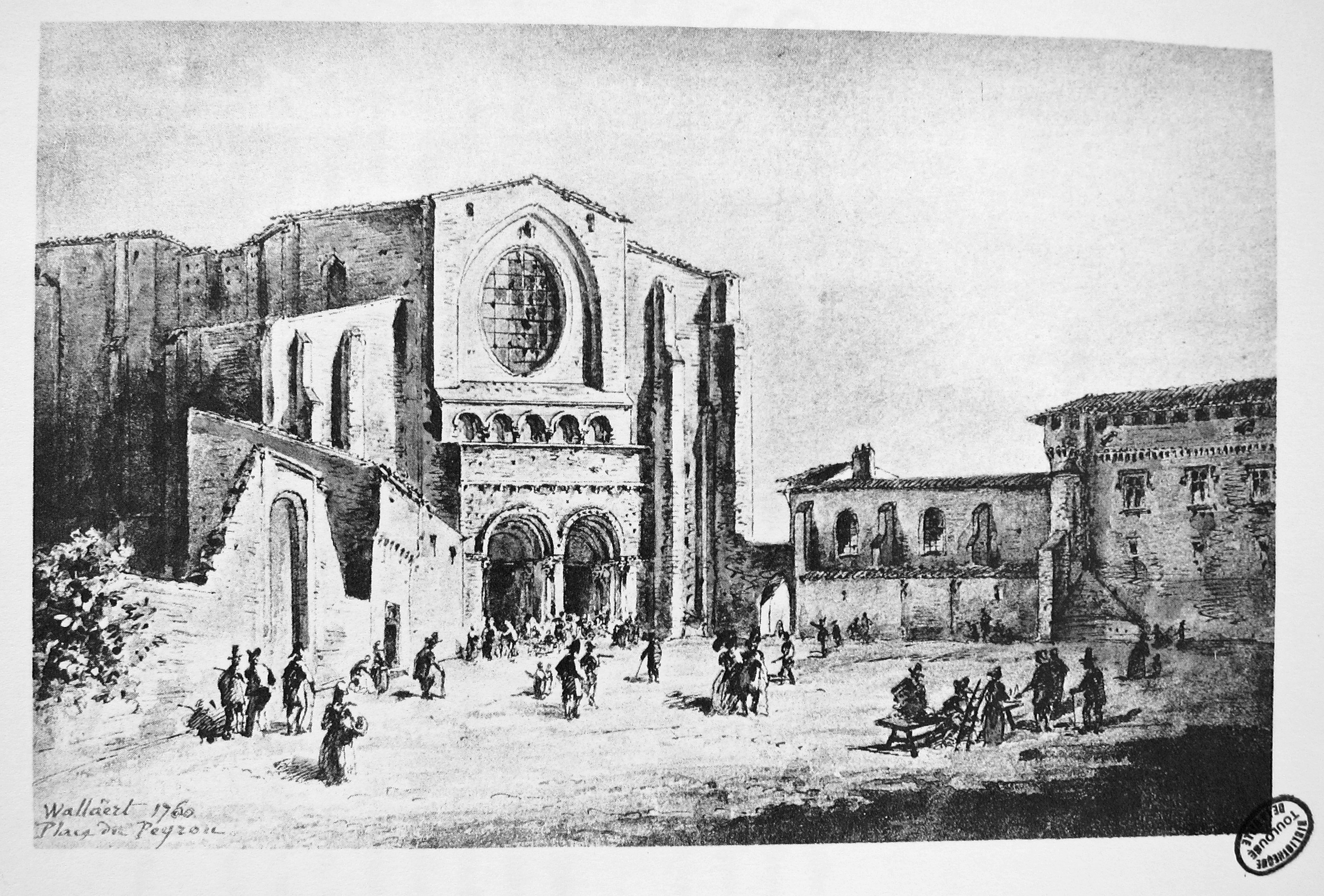
Basilique Saint-Sernin and Saint-Raymond College connected by the Peyrou arch in 1760. Drawing by Pierre Joseph Wallaert.

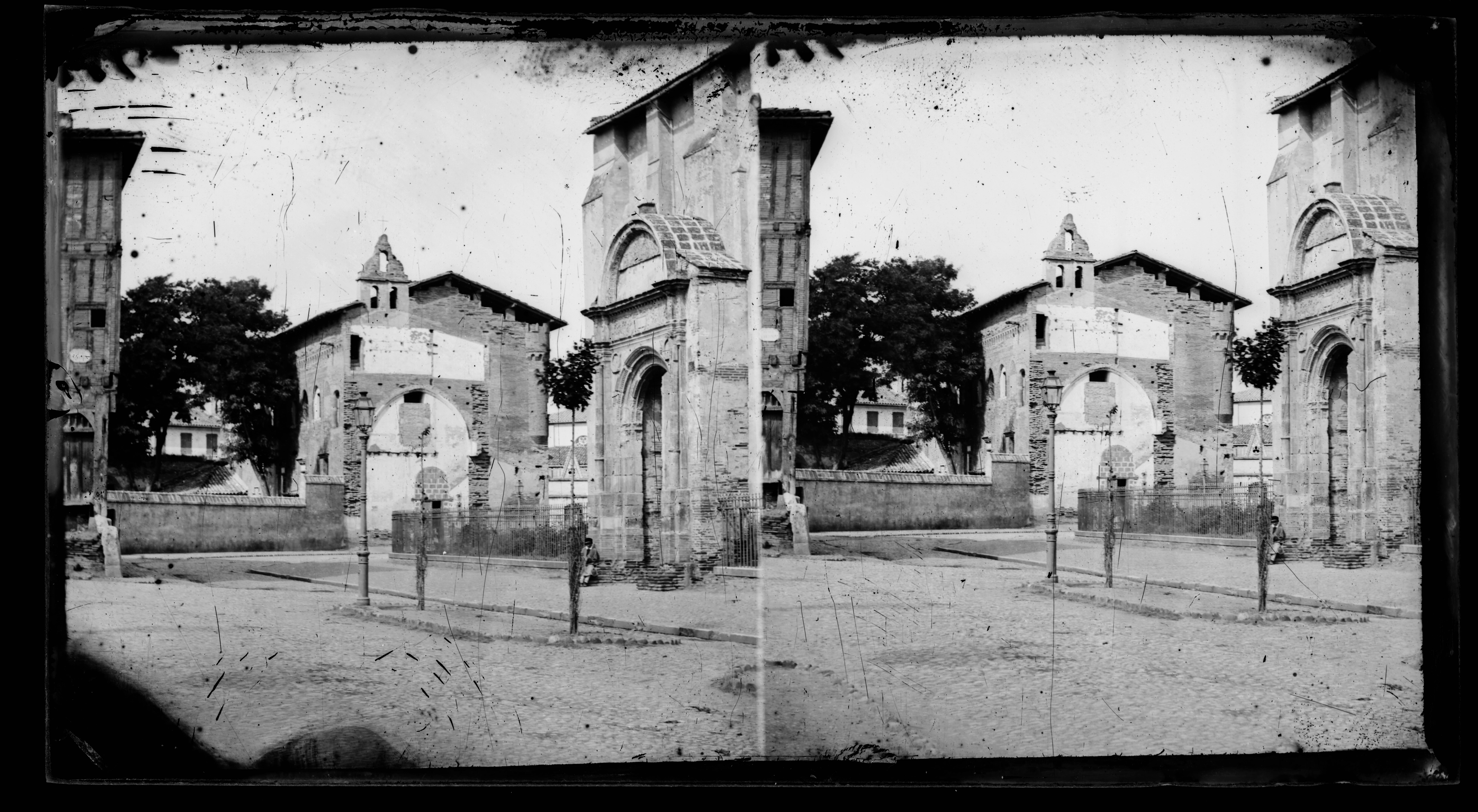
Stereoscopic view of the college by Eugène Trutat c. 1860 showing traces of the old chapel before the restoration by Viollet-Le-Duc

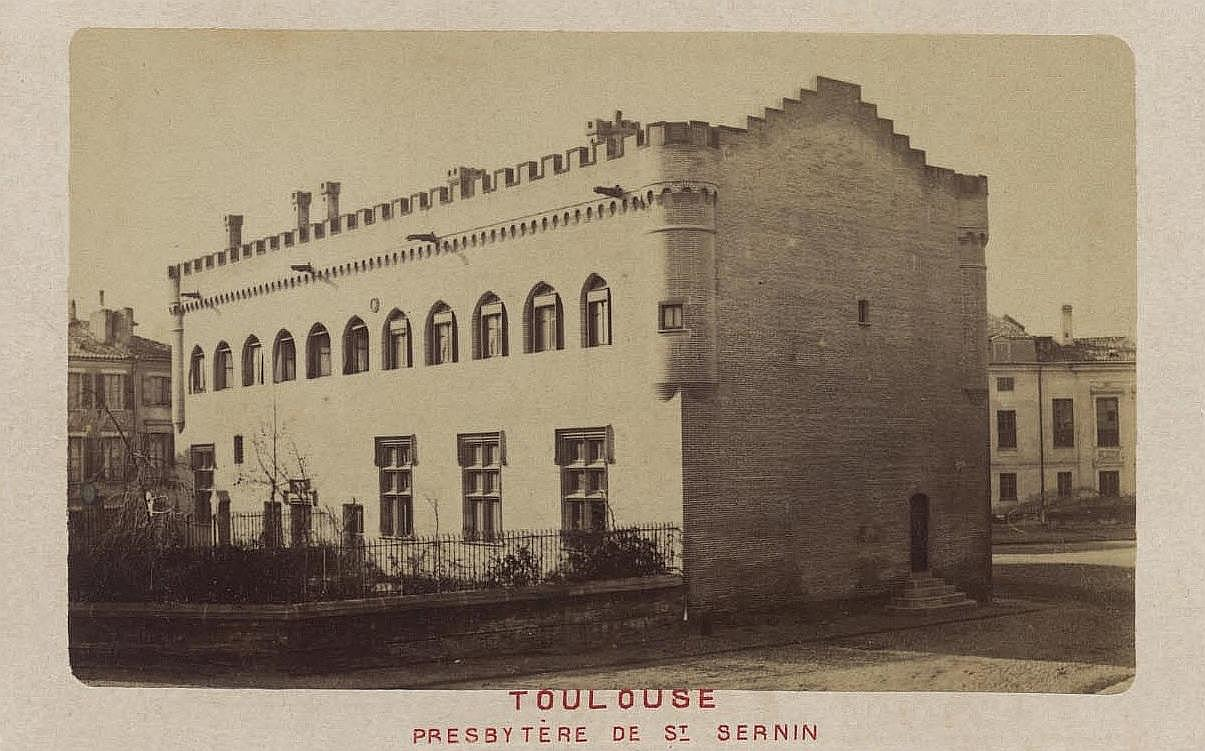
1880sː the presbytery of the Saint-Sernin Basilica became Saint-Raymond Museum in 1892

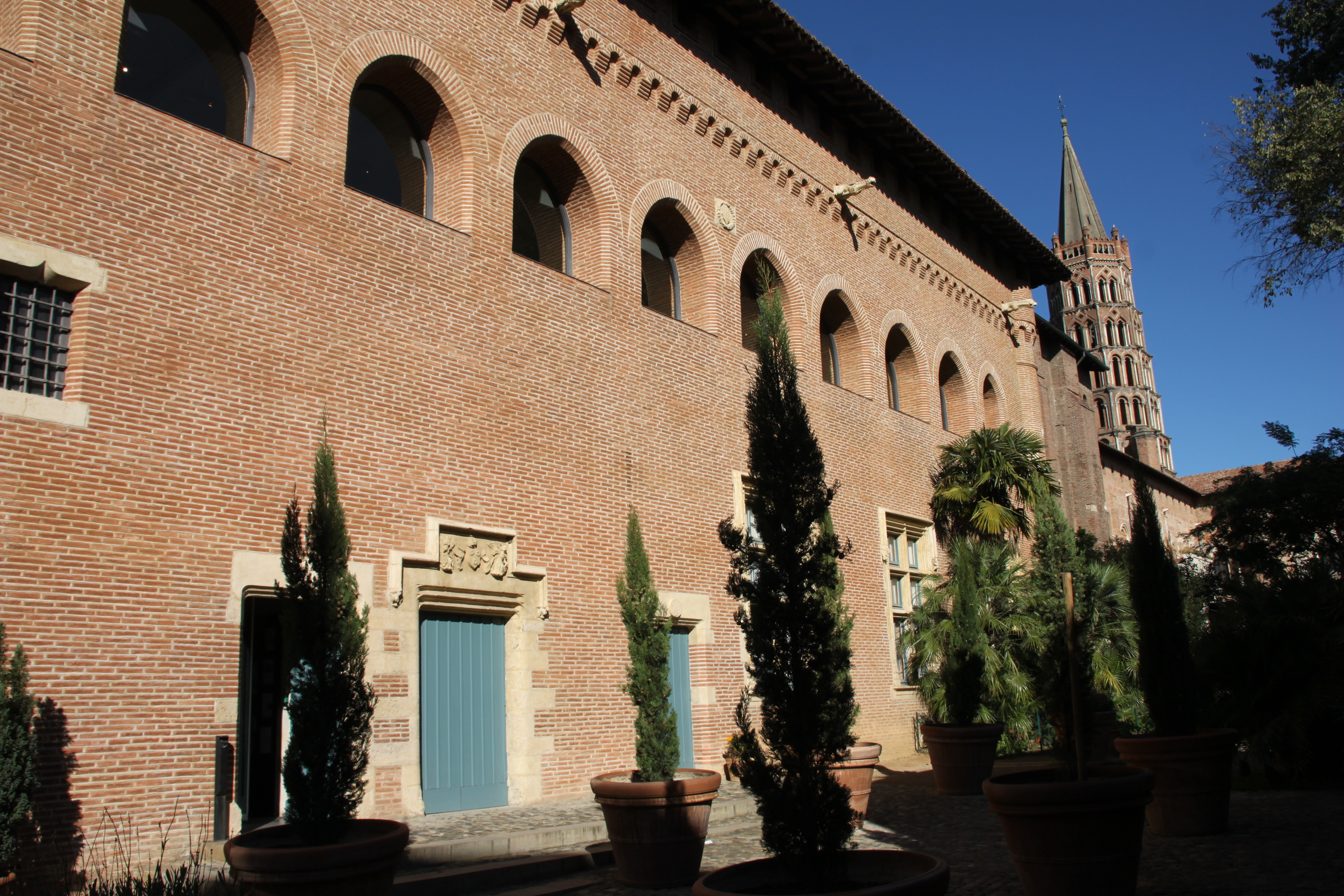
The renovated building stands next to the basilica of Saint-Sernin.

== History of the museum ==
By a municipal decree of 14 April 1891, the building became a "museum of ancient and exotic decorative arts" and was inaugurated on 24 April 1892 by Toulouse mayor Camille Ournac in the presence of Jean Jaurès, city councilor.

Excerpts from 24 April 1892 inaugural speeches (translated from original French):
The creation of this museum is essentially democratic in the highest sense of the word; And it is usefully, in my opinion, to work for the people, to teach him history by the eyes; It is to form his taste, to inculcate in him the love of the beautiful in all its forms, all things which make man better. (Note: La création de ce musée est une œuvre essentiellement démocratique dans le sens le plus élevé du mot ; et c'est utilement, à mon avis, travailler pour le peuple, que de lui enseigner l'histoire par les yeux; c'est former son goût, que de lui inculquer l'amour du beau sous toutes ses formes, toutes choses qui rendent l'homme meilleur.)

Camille Ournac, mayor of Toulouse

No doubt the results are still very much below what we would have liked. At least, we have brought to the common task a great deal of devotion and passion. And now it is up to you, gentlemen, to complete it; It is to the public, the supreme judge and without appeal, to decide the future and to grow the work by making it its own and taking as much pleasure as we had to prepare it. (Note: Sans doute, les résultats sont encore très au-dessous de ce que nous aurions voulu. Du moins, avons-nous apporté à la tâche commune beaucoup de dévouement et de passion. Et maintenant, c'est à vous messieurs, de la compléter; c'est au public, juge suprême et sans appel, à décider de l'avenir et à grandir l’œuvre en la faisant sienne et en y prenant autant de plaisir que nous avons eu à la préparer.)

Ernest Roschach, curator of the museum

It was dedicated for "small antiquities", small items (ethnographic objects, art objects, furniture, coins and medals and archaeological objects) from all periods. It thus served to unburden the Musée des Augustins, that was still under renovation, of objects it was impossible to display there. The building was adapted to its new functions by the architect Arthur Romestin, when stairs, partitions and cupboards were altered to create larger exhibition spaces. Several additional windows were created to provide better light.

The museum was thoroughly reorganized by a new curator, Émile Cartailhac, who took over in 1912. In 1935, Henri Ramet (fr) named it the Cluny museum in Toulouse. The Society of Friends of the Saint-Raymond Museum and ancient art was founded in 1939. The museum was again rebuilt in 1946–1950 by Robert Mesuret, listed as a Monument historique on 11 August 1975, and its upper parts were restored in 1981–1982 to return them to their condition before the intervention of Viollet-le-Duc. In 1949, under the direction of Robert Mesuret, it became the archeological museum of Toulouse, receiving the collections of Antiquity and the Early Middle Ages of the city of Toulouse.

Due to its age, between 1978, and 1982, a new rehabilitation project of the entire museum was launched under the direction of Yves Boiret, then chief architect of French Historic Monuments. The work began in 1981–1982, with the refurbishment of the roof, that regained the appearance it had before the restoration by Viollet-Le-Duc and allowed the development of a second level below the roof. In the following years, among a lot of controversy, Boiret rehabilitates the nearby basilica of Saint Sernin. In 1980, the City of Toulouse acquired a neighboring building at 11 rue des Trois-Renards to relocate its offices, technical services and library, to provide and additional 2,500 m^{2} of exhibition space for the public.

Between 1992, and 1994, a building was constructed in the Bourrassol district of Toulouse to house the reserve collections. A new redevelopment study was carried out under the direction of Bernard Voinchet, the chief architect of Historic Monuments in 1992, and in 1994, a complete reorganization was arranged by Dominique Baudis, Mayor of Toulouse.

Between 1994, and 1996, archaeological excavations were undertaken to uncover the necropolis of Saint-Sernin, near the tomb of the martyred saint Saturnin, and his burials dating to the 4th century. A lime kiln dating from the 5th or 6th century was also discovered, and with about a hundred sepulchres and several inscriptions viewable today. After more than four years renovation the museum reopened to the public on Saturday, 8 May 1999, having been restored to its original 1523 appearance, while a part of the ancient early Christian necropolis, dating from the fourth and fifth centuries, has been excavated.

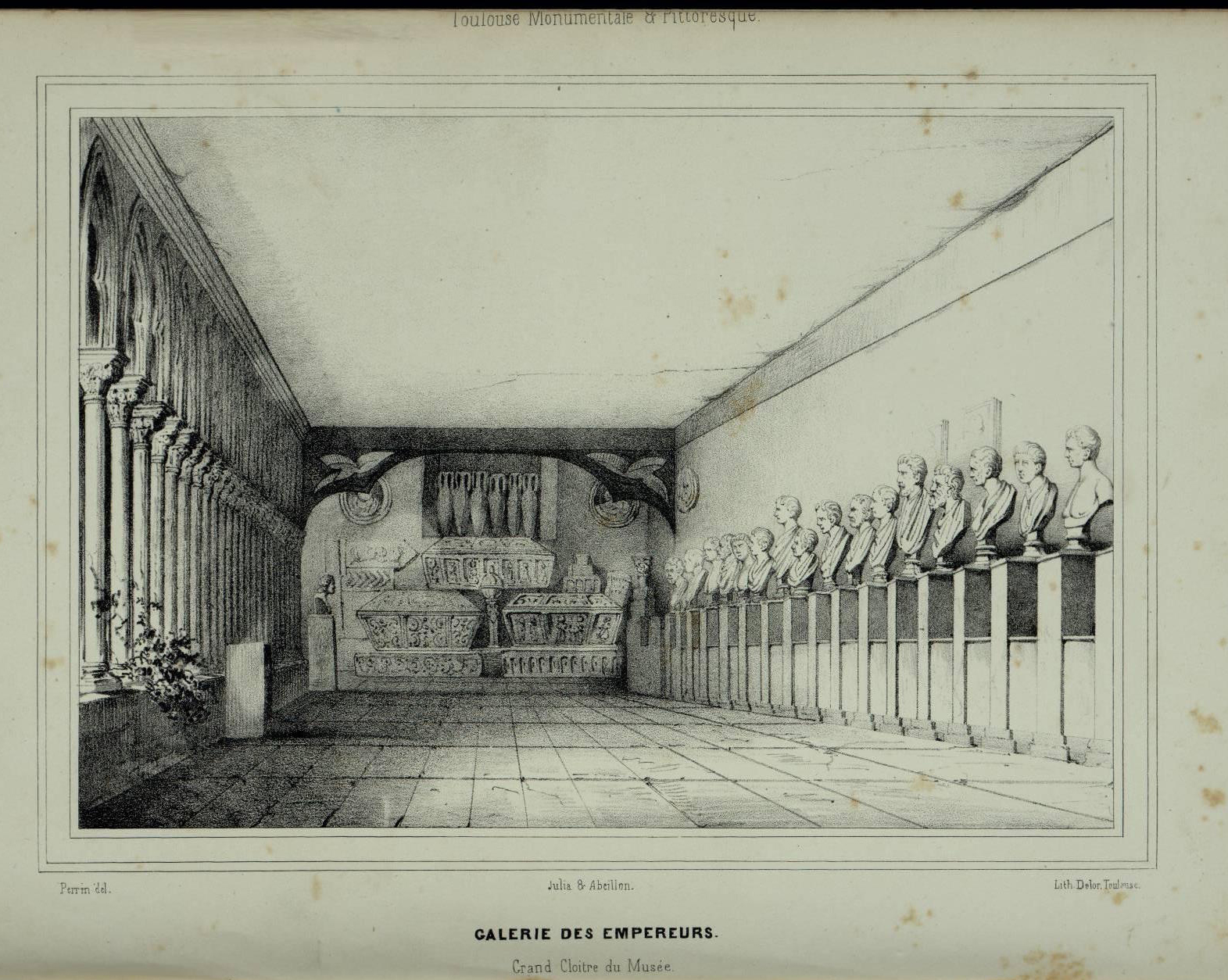
Gallery of the Emperors in the cloister of the Musée des Augustins c. 1842

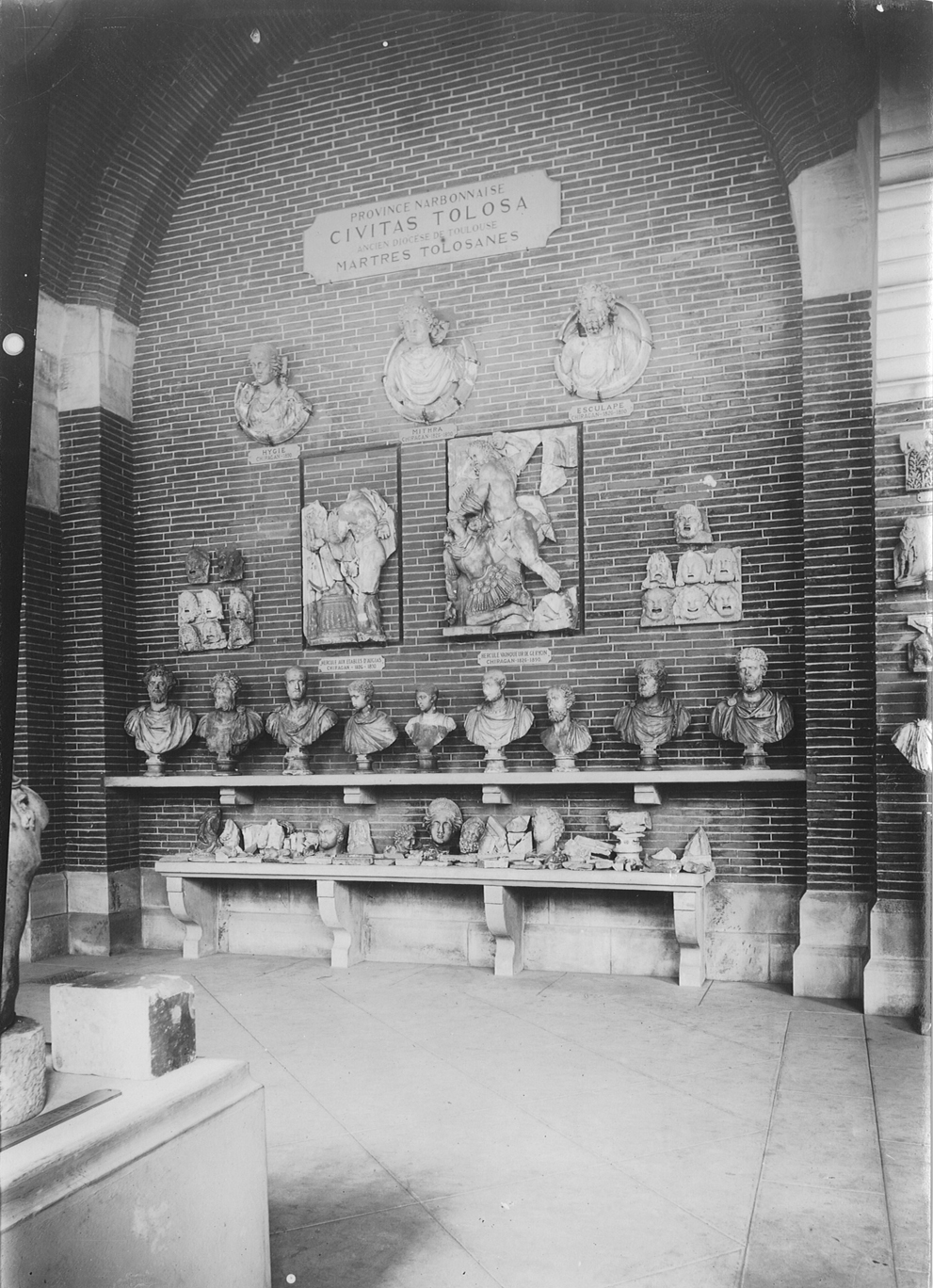
Antiquities of Martres-Tolosane at the Musée des Augustins 1890

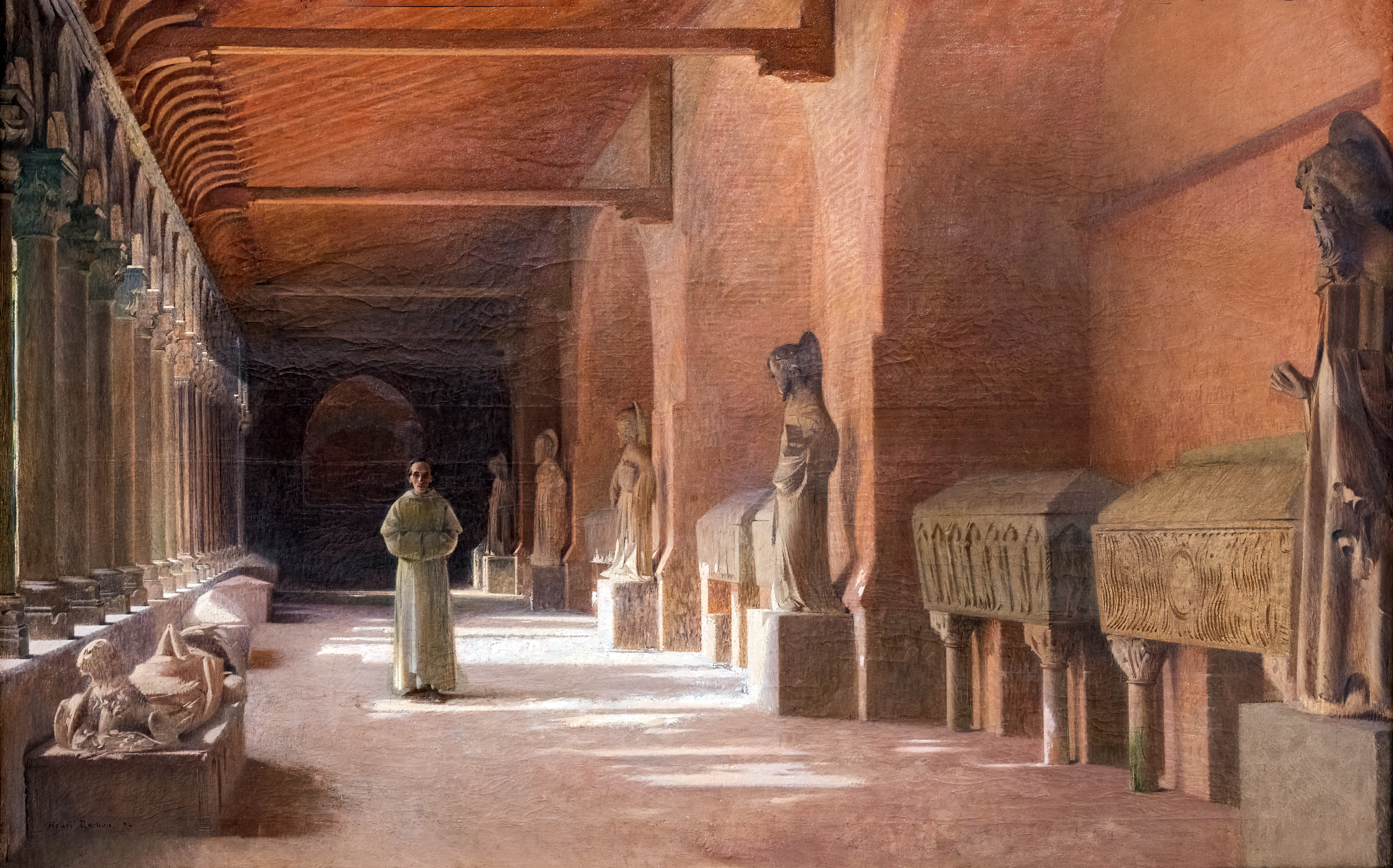
Henri Rachou's painting Meditation showing the cloister of the Musée des Augustins where the early Christian sarcophagi were displayed before their transfer to the Musée Saint-Raymond

== Museum curators ==
- Ernest Roschach (1892–98)
- Casimir Destrem (1898–1905)
- Henri Rachou (1905–12)
- Emile Cartailhac (1912–21)
- Jules Fourcade (1922–34)
- Eugène-Humbert Guitard (1935–48)
- Robert Mesuret (1949–72)
- Jacqueline Labrousse (1972–85)
- Daniel Cazes (1985–2009)
- Evelyne Ugaglia (2010–18)
- Laure Barthet (2018–present)

== Transfer and distribution of Toulouse collections ==
- 1892: monumental works remained at the Museum of the Augustins and small objects were transferred from the Musée Saint-Raymond
- 1931: the ethnographic collection was transferred to the Natural History Museum of Toulouse
- 1950: the ancient lapidary collections were transferred from the Musée des Augustins to the Musée Saint-Raymond
- 1961: transfer to the Paul-Dupuy Museum of collections after the Merovingian period

== Collections ==
=== Formation ===
The original collection originated from the collections of the Académie des sciences, inscriptions et belles-lettres de Toulouse (fr), and the Royal Academy of Painting, Sculpture and Architecture, seized during the French Revolution giving birth to the Provisional Museum of the Republic installed in the Augustinian convent of Toulouse in 1793. The sculptures, discovered in the ancient Roman villa of Chiragan during the excavations conducted between 1826, and 1830 by Alexandre Du Mège, who became curator in 1832, were incorporated in the Museum of Antiquities arranged in the galleries of the cloister of the museum. The public can discover a remarkable ensemble along the Gallery of the Emperors and the Gallery of La Venus that can only be compared to the Louvre.

In passing through this establishment, a lively and ardent youth may feel the need for a solid education, and the desire not to be a stranger to the knowledge of the diverse civilizations which in turn have reigned in the old world.
(translated from the original French (Note: En parcourant cet établissement, une jeunesse vive et ardente sentira peut-être le besoin d'une instruction solide et le désir de n'être point étrangère à la connaissance des diverses civilisations qui tour à tour ont régné dans l'ancien monde.)) - Alexandre Du Mège

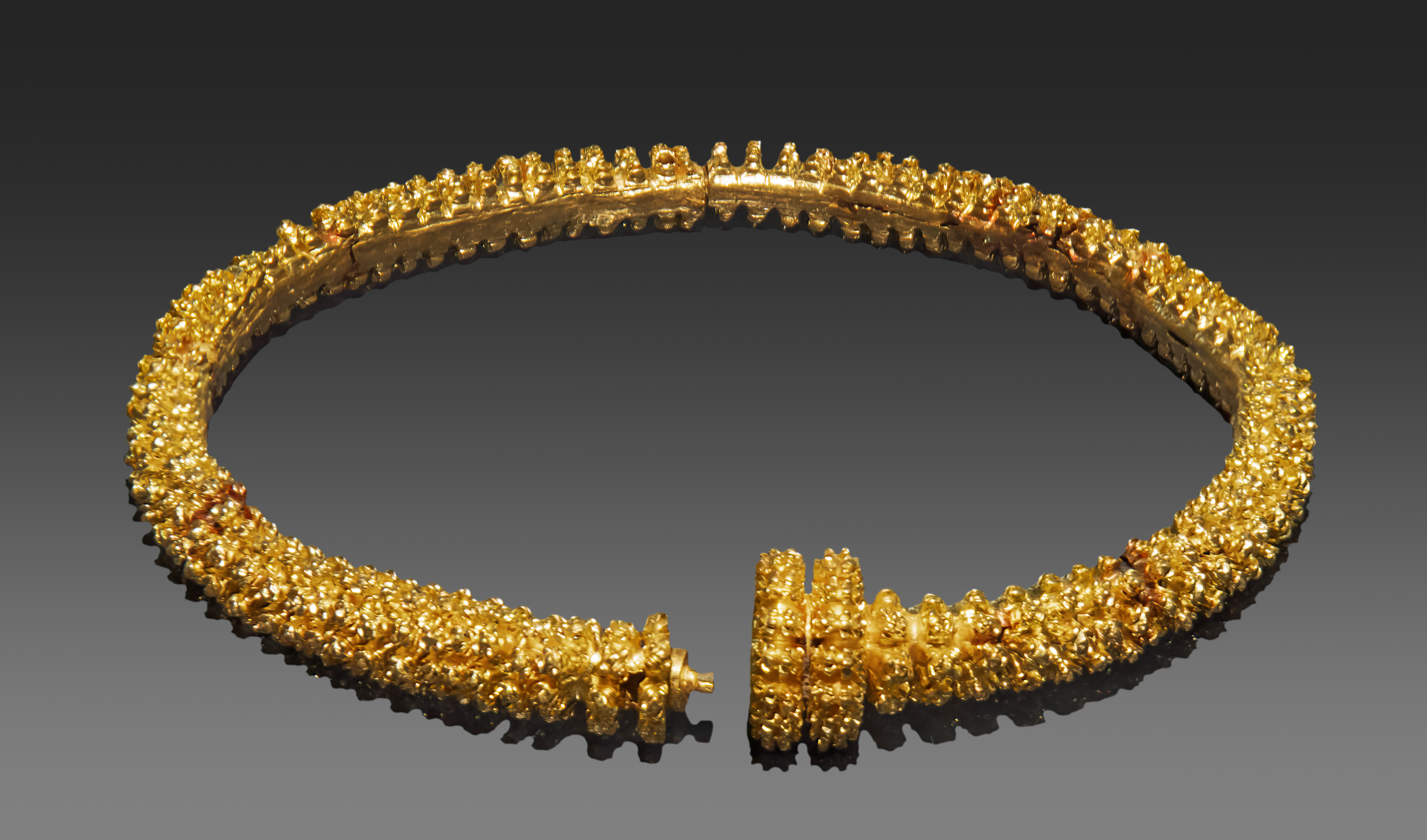
Torques of Fenouillet

Founded in 1831, the Archaeological Society of the Midi of France (fr) contributed to the enrichment of collections allowing the acquisition of major pieces for the collection, such as the torques of Fenouillet and portraits of Béziers, in addition to receiving other offerings or donations. In 1893, the museum gave up an important collection to the city for an annuity.

Collectors have benefited from the enrichment of the museum with the donations of Antoine Bibent of objects from Pompeii, in 1831, the Count of Clarac donated Greek and Etruscan vases in 1843, Edward Barry gave small bronzes, and in 1862, the state deposited part of the Campana collection. Many other acquisitions were made in the late 19th, and early 20th centuries.

The curator, Jules Fourcade acquired many pieces of ironwork from Toulouse and under the direction of Robert Mesuret, from 1961, after several movements of the collections, the museum mainly specialises in archeology and has become the Museum of Antiques of Toulouse.

Excavations carried out by the Regional Service of Archeology (SRA) contributed greatly to the increase of the collections during the years 1980–1990.

=== From prehistory to eleventh century ===
For the protohistory, the museum has bracelets, fibulae and axes from the Bronze Age, and bracelets and leg rings in gold from Fenouillet and Lasgraisses for the Iron Age and more precisely from the time of the Volques Tectosages (fr). The rest of the Iron Age collections come from the Cluzel, Estarac and Vieille-Toulouse sites.

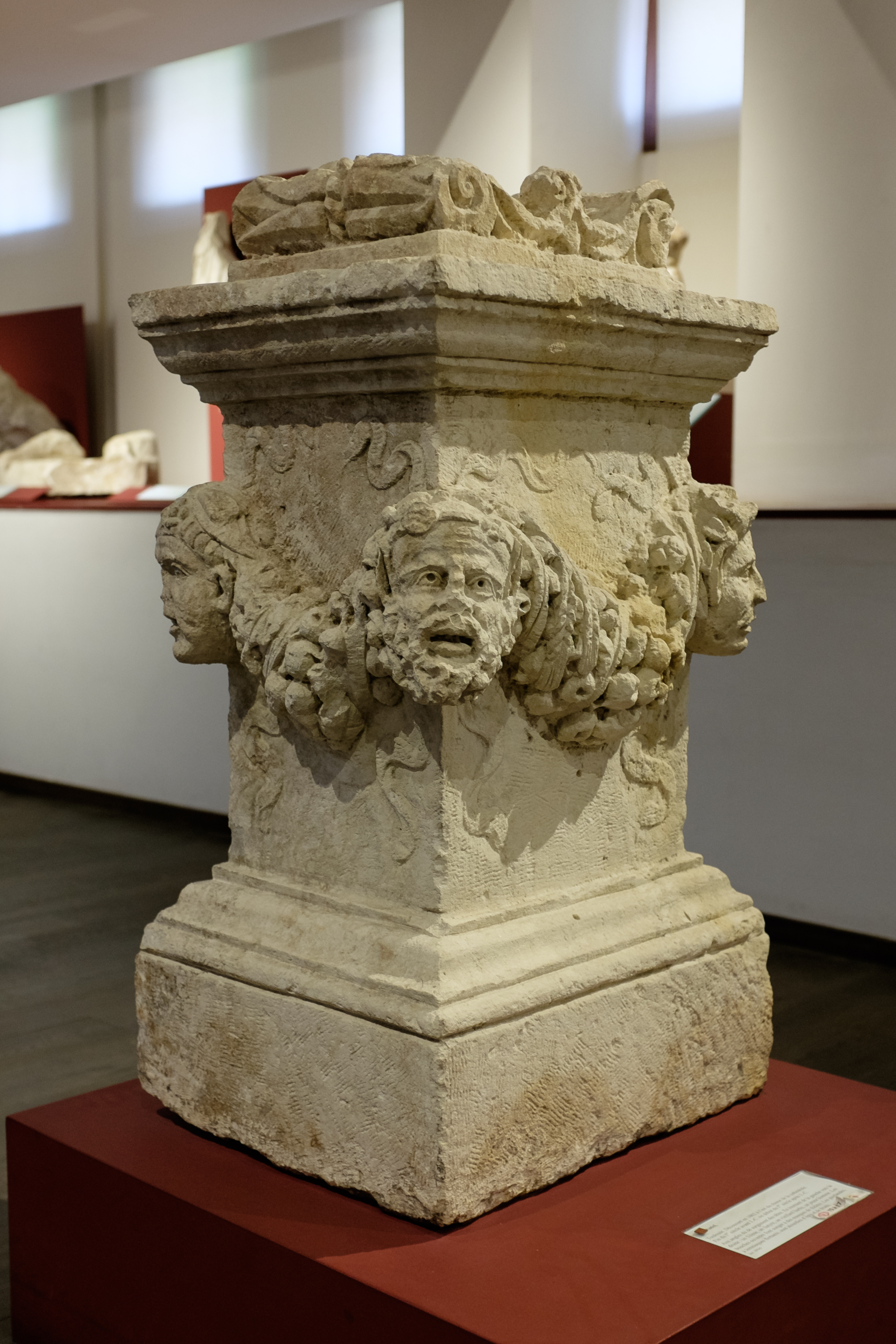
1st century limestone votive altar

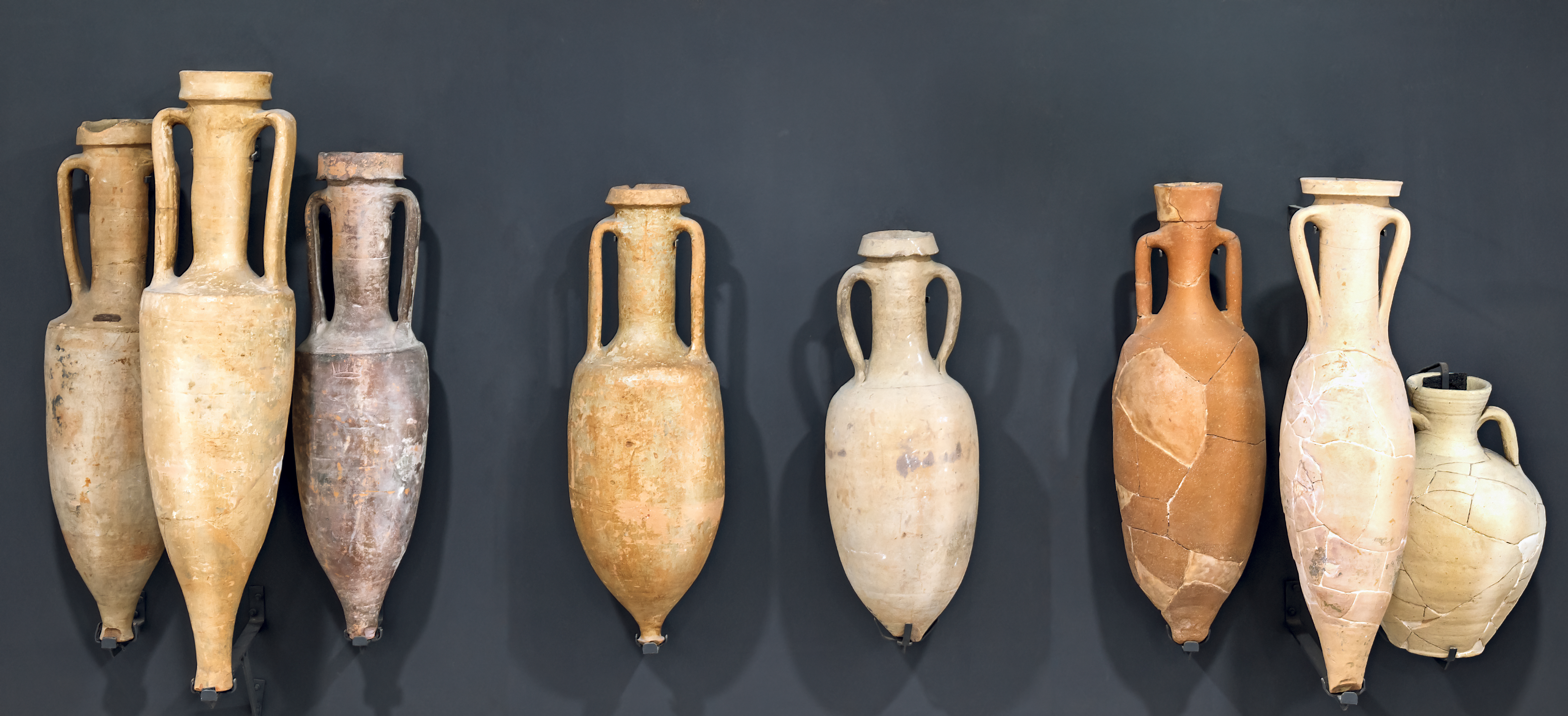
Amphores of Vieille-Toulouse; types 1A and 1B found in a funerary well in Vieille-Toulouse dating from the end of the 2nd century BC.

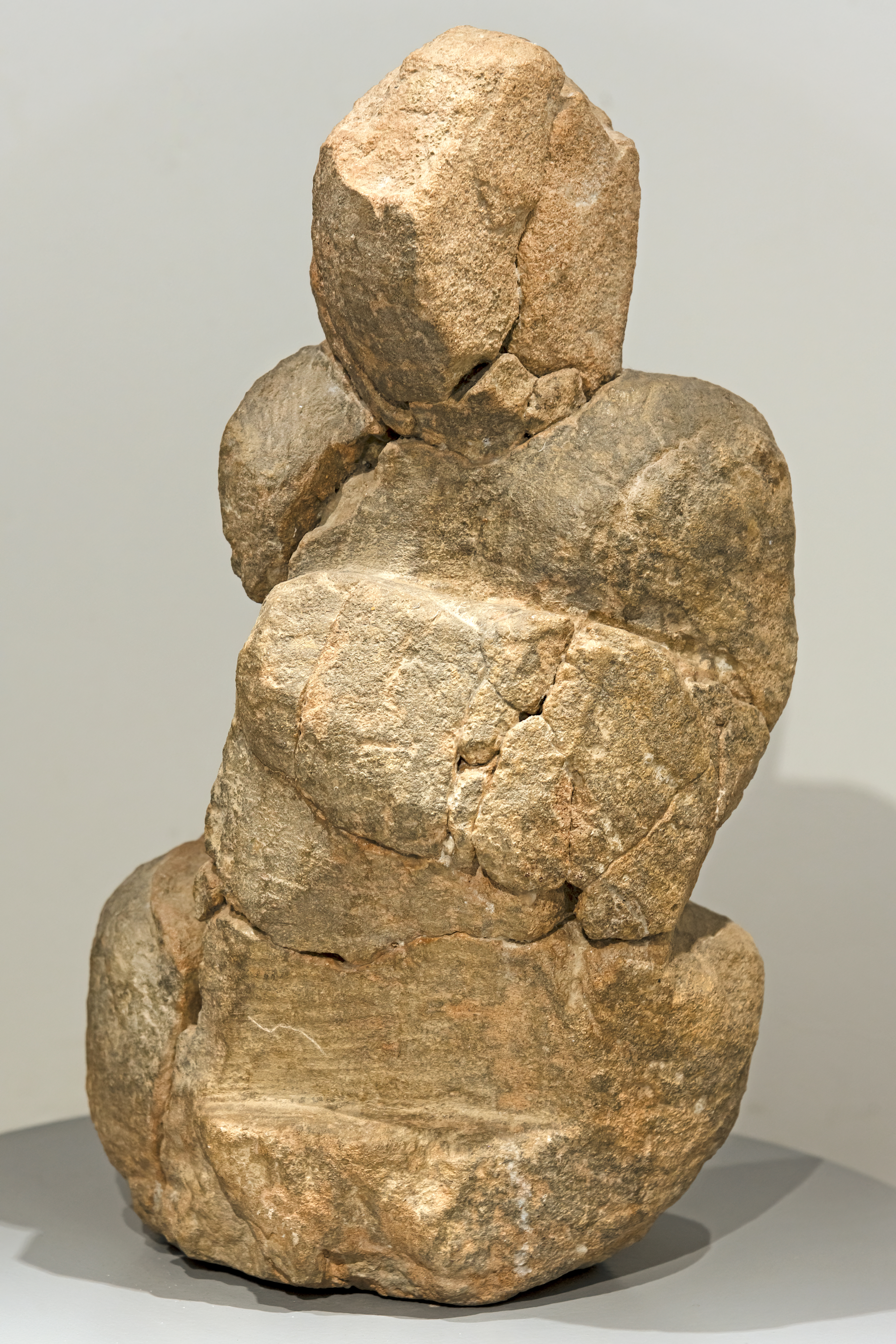
Anthropomorphic statue, 44 - 25 av. J.-C., site of Vieille-Toulouse.

Several civilizations of the Mediterranean are represented: Cypriot and Etruscan pieces, Greek and Italian vases from the eighth to the first century BC and Hellenistic terracotta figurines.

The museum has a very important Roman collection, with ornate oil lamps, sigillated vases from Montans and La Graufesenque, keys and figures of bonzes, mosaics from the end of the Roman Empire from Sigognac, Granéjouls, Saint-Rustice and Saint-Pierre-des-Cuisines, many epigraphs with a set of votive altars.

The rich collection of Roman busts were discovered partly in the ruins of the Roman villa at Chiragan in Martres-Tolosane, and partly in Béziers in 1844, which makes the museum's collection the second largest after the Louvre. The busts includes many emperors and their families but also, as yet unidentified, magistrates, soldiers, men, women and children. The discoveries of the villa Chiragan also cover reliefs of the Labours of Hercules, statues and busts of the Greco-Roman deities.

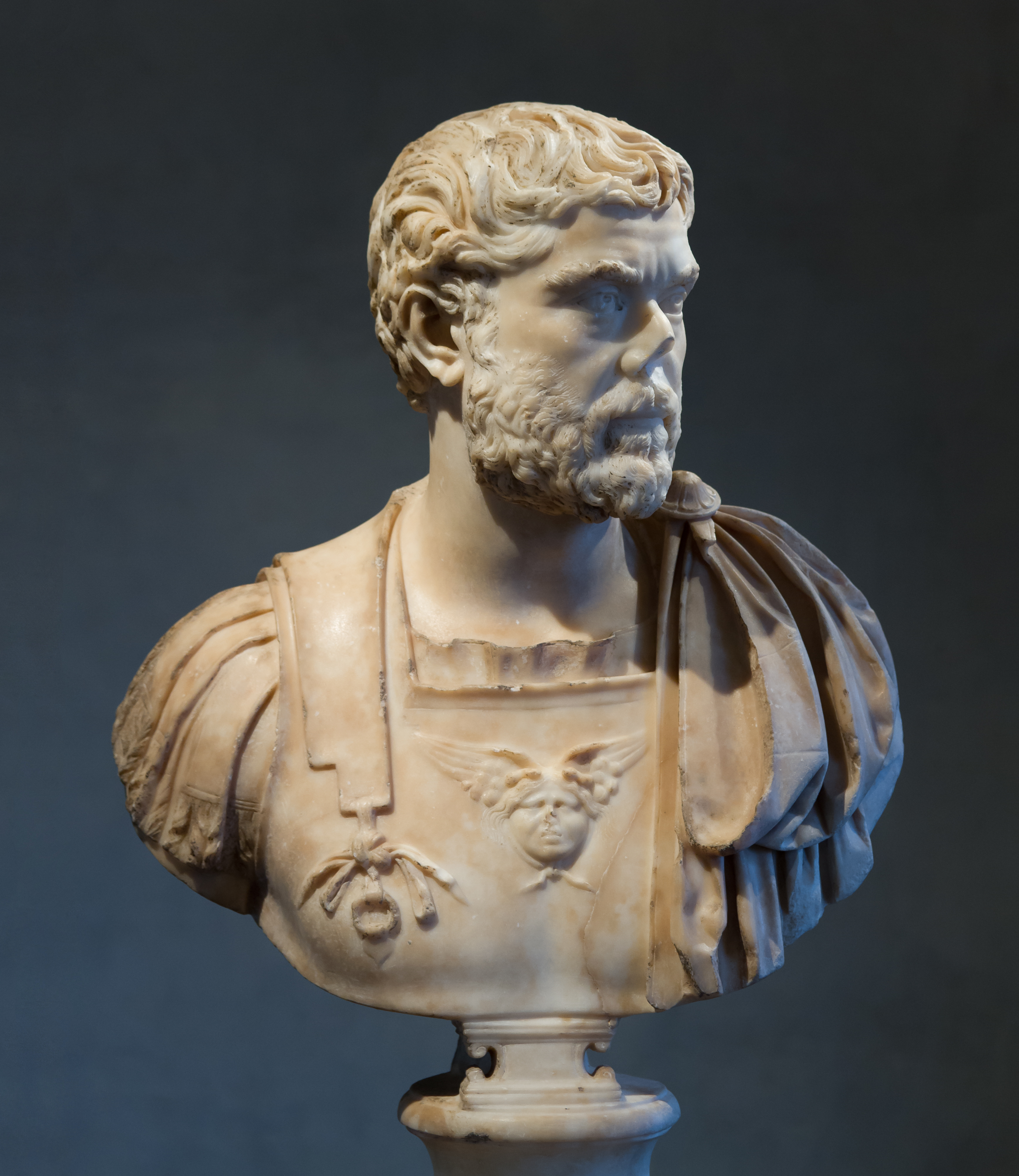
Roman bust of an armoured man about 130 AD.

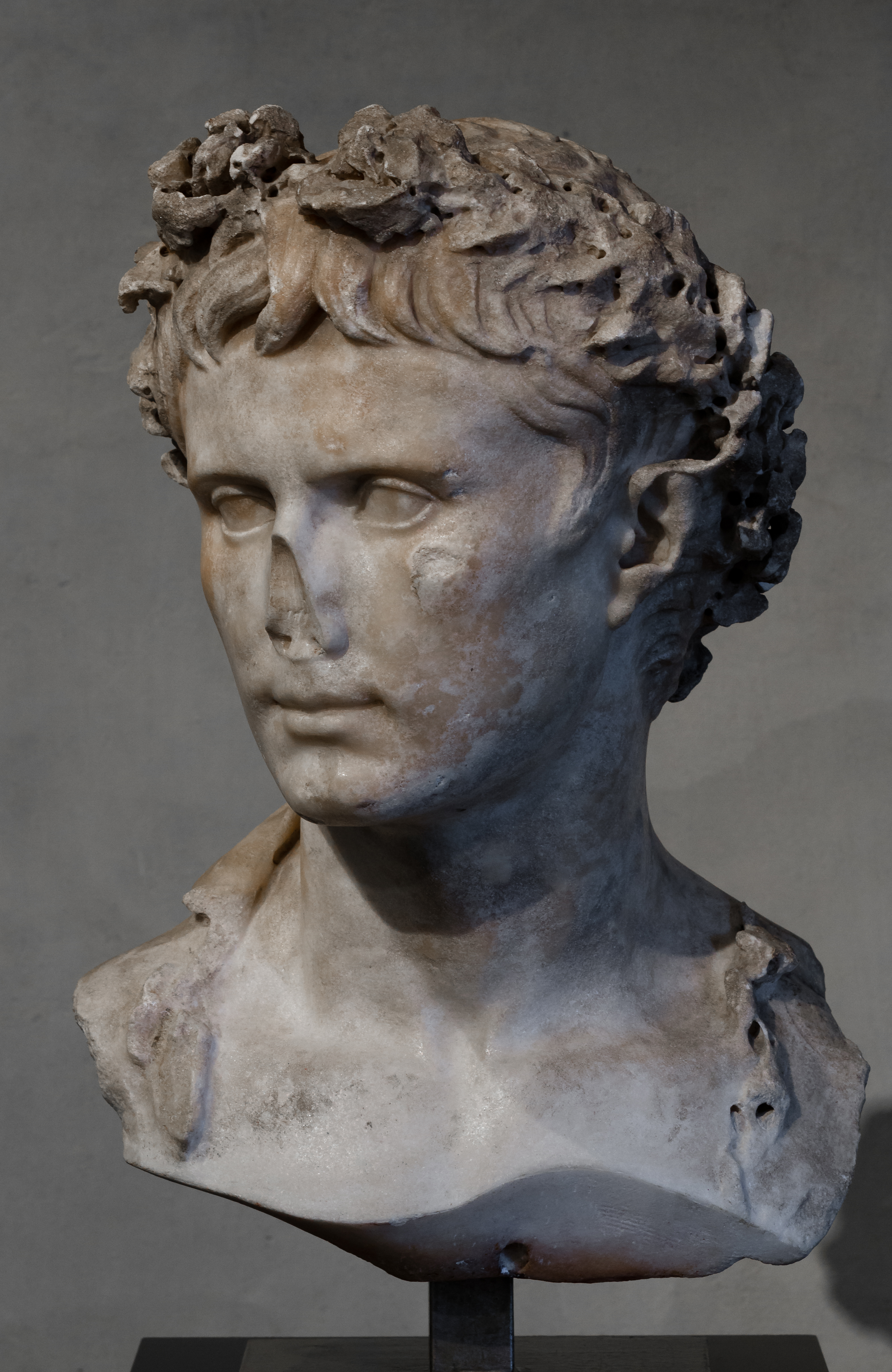
Head of Augustus of Prima Porta

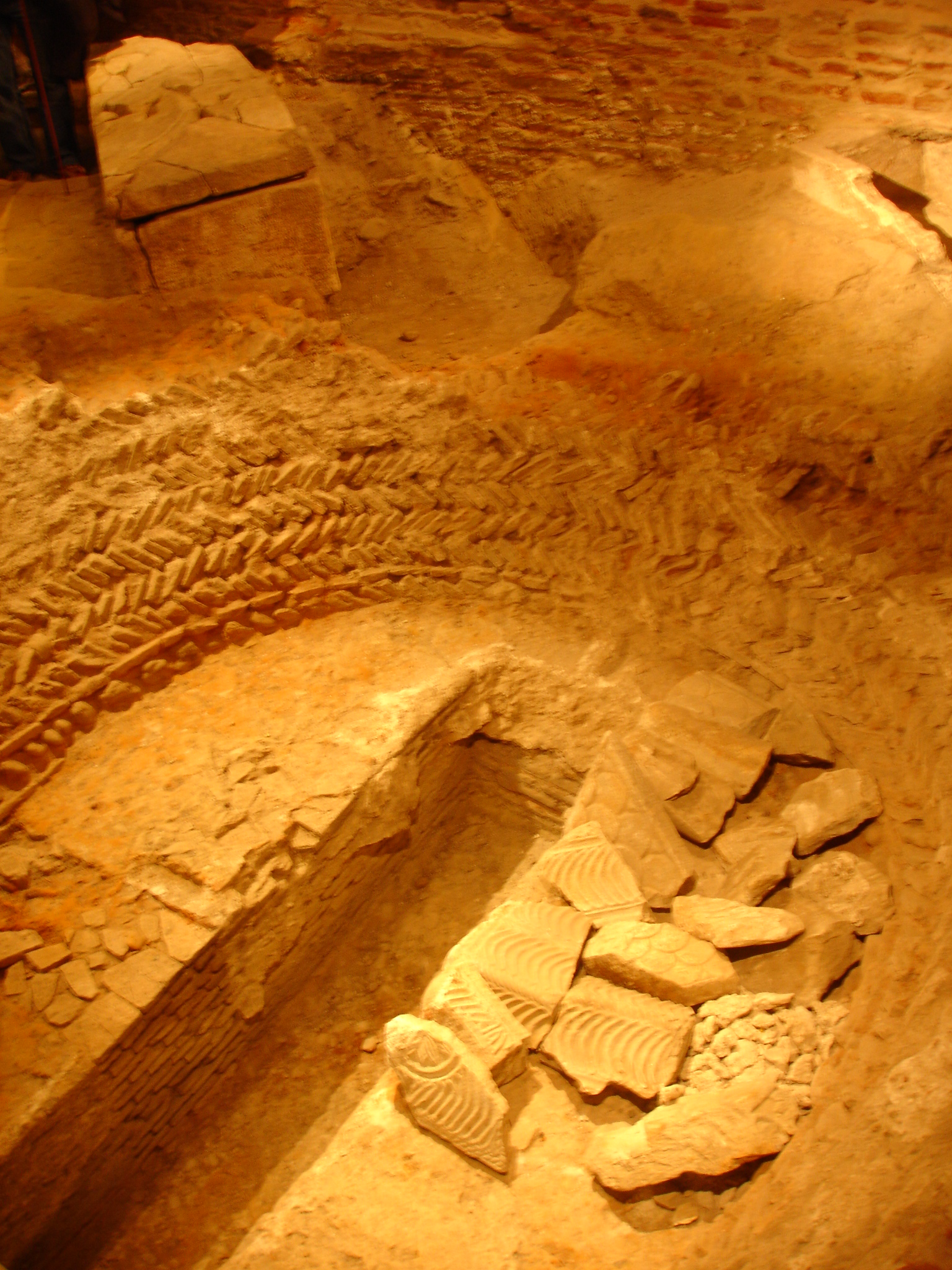
Lime-kiln

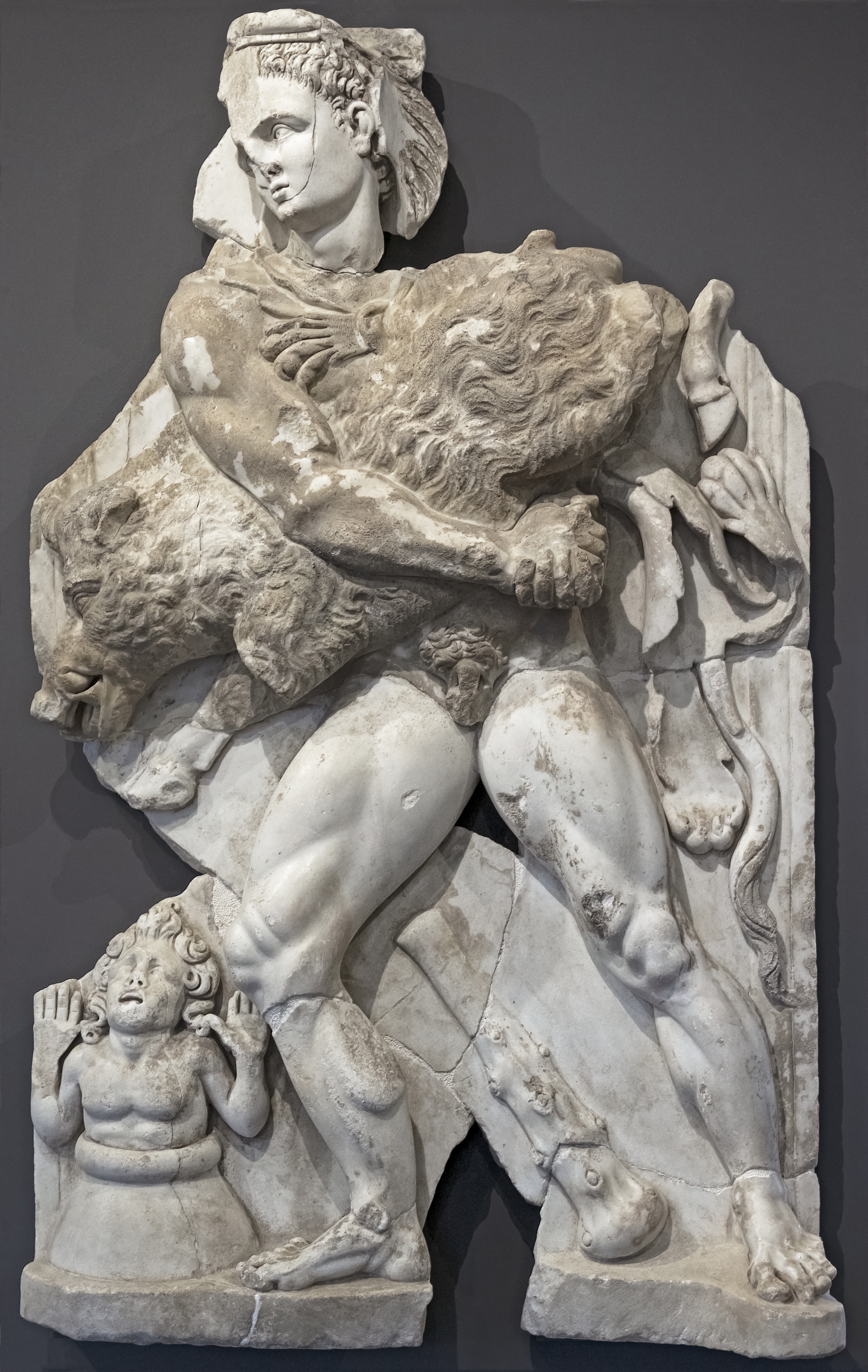
Hercules and the Erymanthian Boar

Unknown theodosian (375-425 AD), sometimes called Placidia

The museum holds an important collection of coins of Greek, Gallic, Iberian, Roman, Byzantine and Merovingian origins. The early Christian and early medieval collections include sculptures, inscriptions, lamps, liturgical vases, ceramics, jewelry, fibulae and belt buckles from Visigothic Spain, Lauragais and Ariège department.

Roman Aureus coins

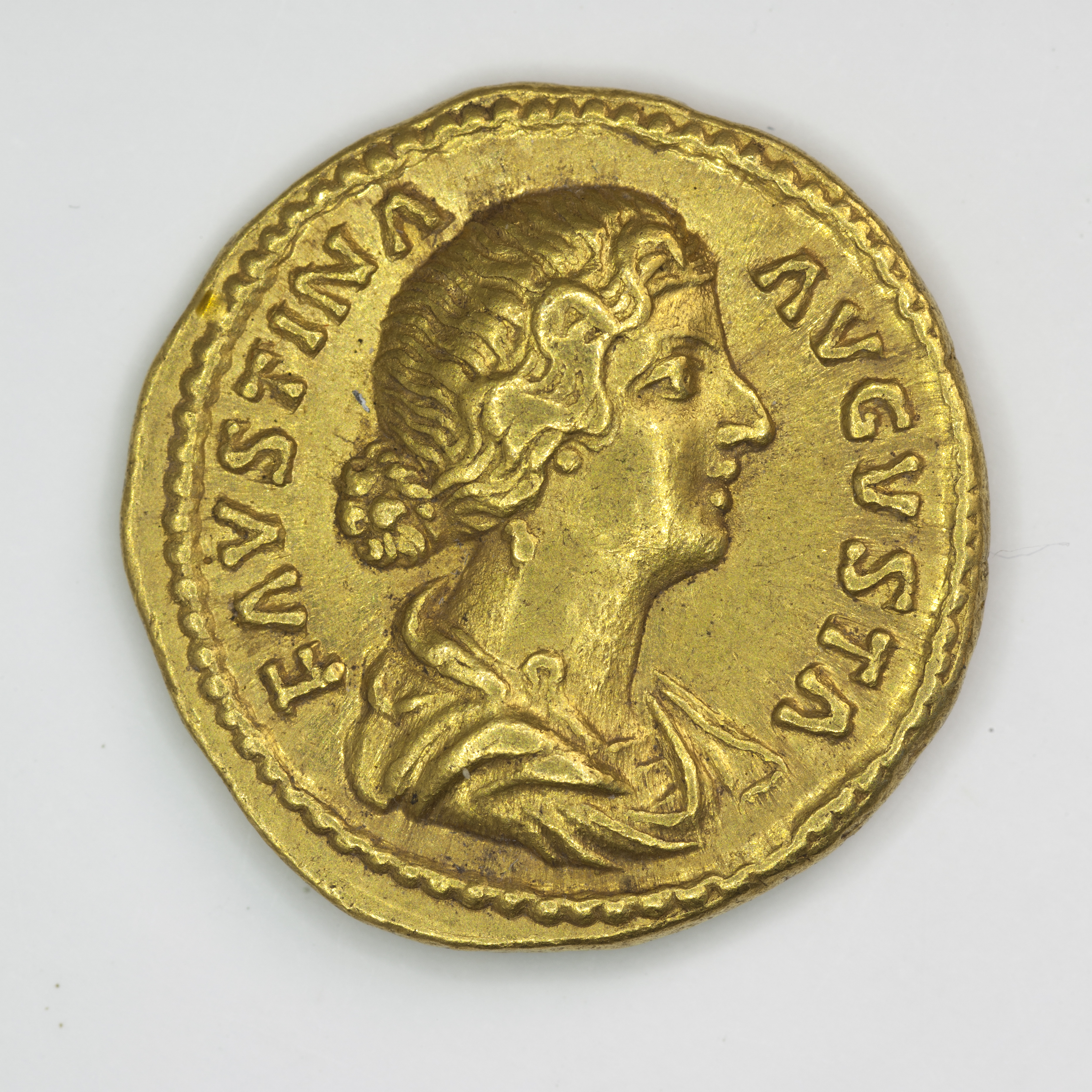

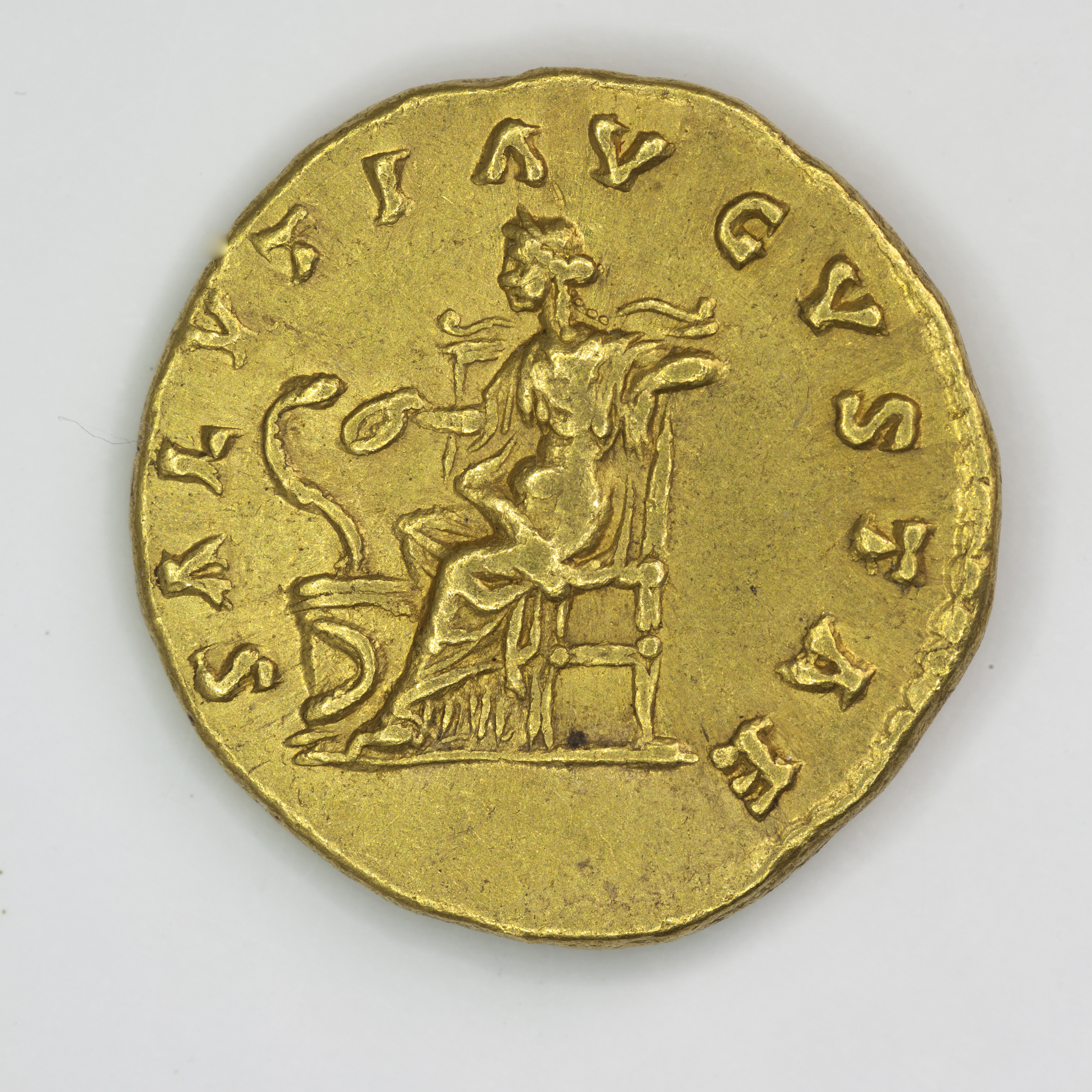

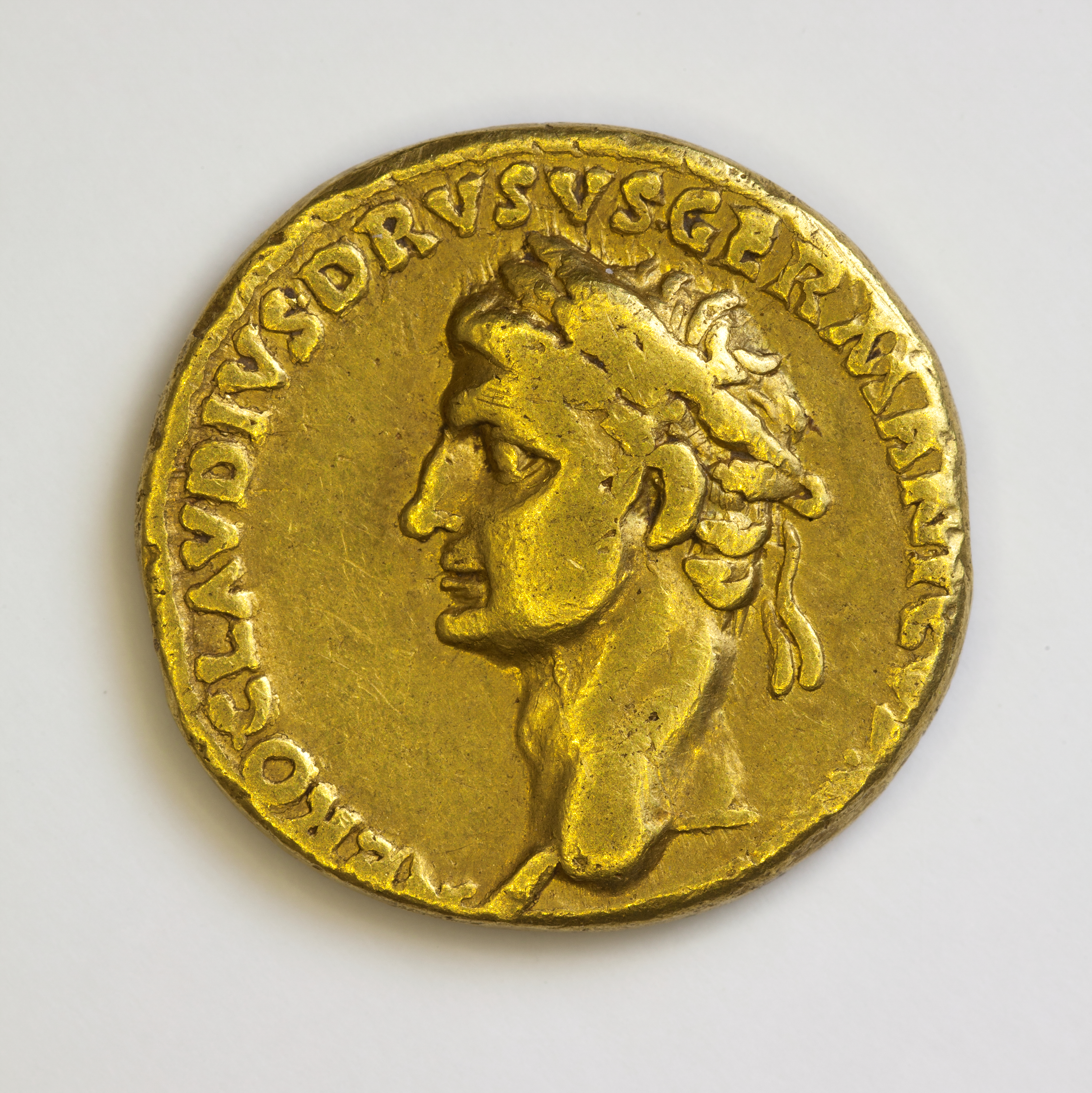

== Museography ==
=== Original museography ===
Ground floor

- Toulouse room with objects on the history of Toulouse and its monuments
- Exotic room with collections of Roquemaurel

First floor

- Egyptian, Greek and Etruscan antiquities room (Clarac collection, Campana deposit, Dugua collection)
- Gallic and Roman Room (Barry Collection)
- Room of the Middle Ages and Renaissance objects

On 30 December 1923, a new ground floor room was inaugurated for temporary exhibitions.

=== 1950s ===
From the 1950s, reserves are accessible to researchers.

Ground floor

- Antique lapidary collections room (Chiragan) and an epigraphy gallery
- Greek ceramic room

First floor

- Room of the Middle Ages and Renaissance objects

From 1961, the first floor rooms were emptied of their collections and hosted temporary exhibitions.

=== Since 1999 ===
After the renovation work of the 1990s, the museum has almost exclusively been dedicated to Roman and early Christian Toulouse, and with its exhibition spaces, the opening to the public of the basement and the second floor adding to the existing two levels, the collections are now spread over four floors.

The second and last floor is dedicated to the Tolosa in the pre-Roman and Roman province of Narbonne. The first floor displays the collection of Roman sculptures found in the Roman villa of Chiragan.

The ground floor accommodates temporary exhibitions in the former tinel, a hall of honor where the student community gathered. In the basement are the early Christian necropolis, developed at the time the first basilica housing the body of Saint-Saturnin was built, sarcophagi and funerary inscriptions and a lime kiln.

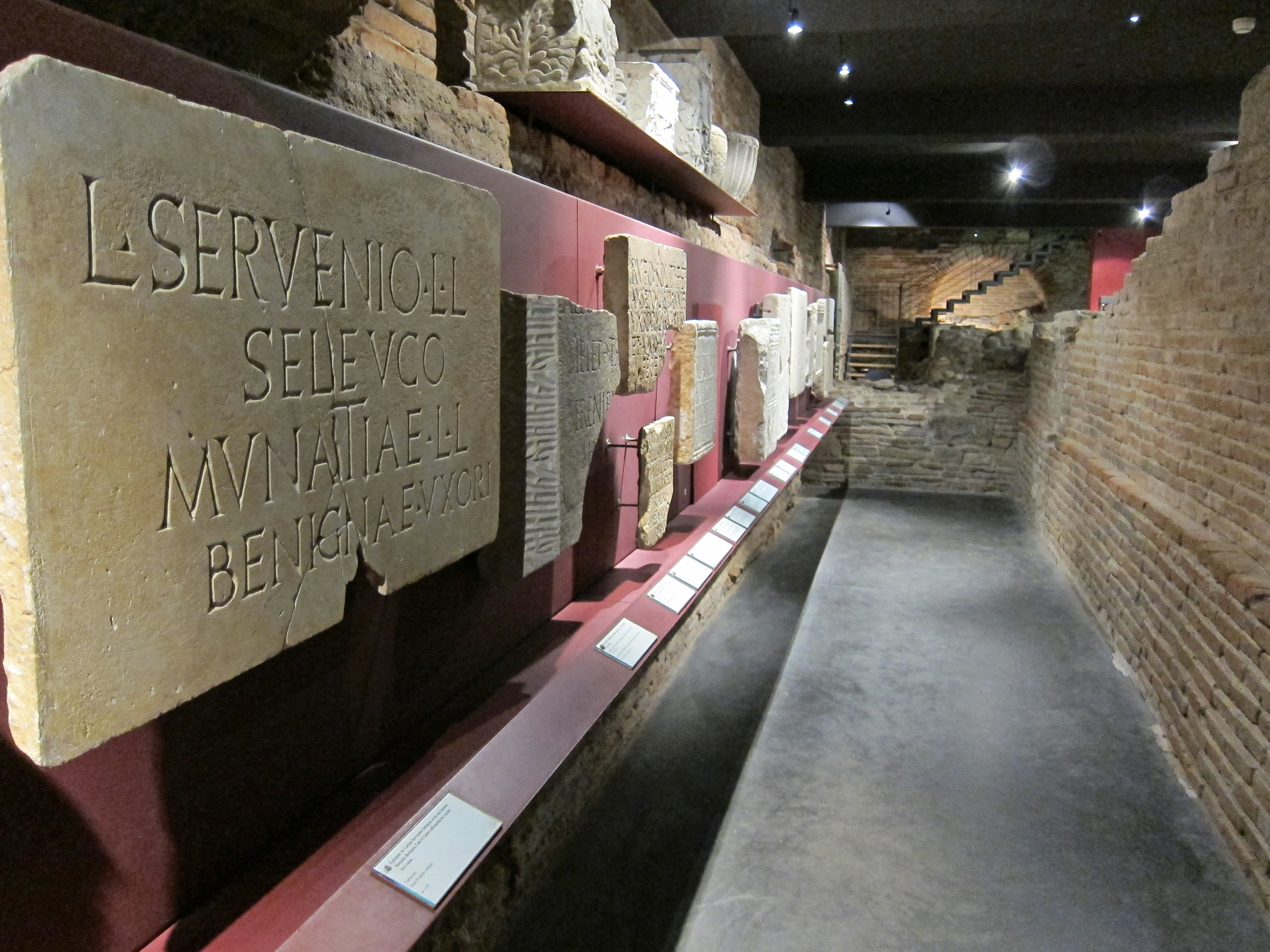
Latin funerary epitaphs on the basement gallery wall

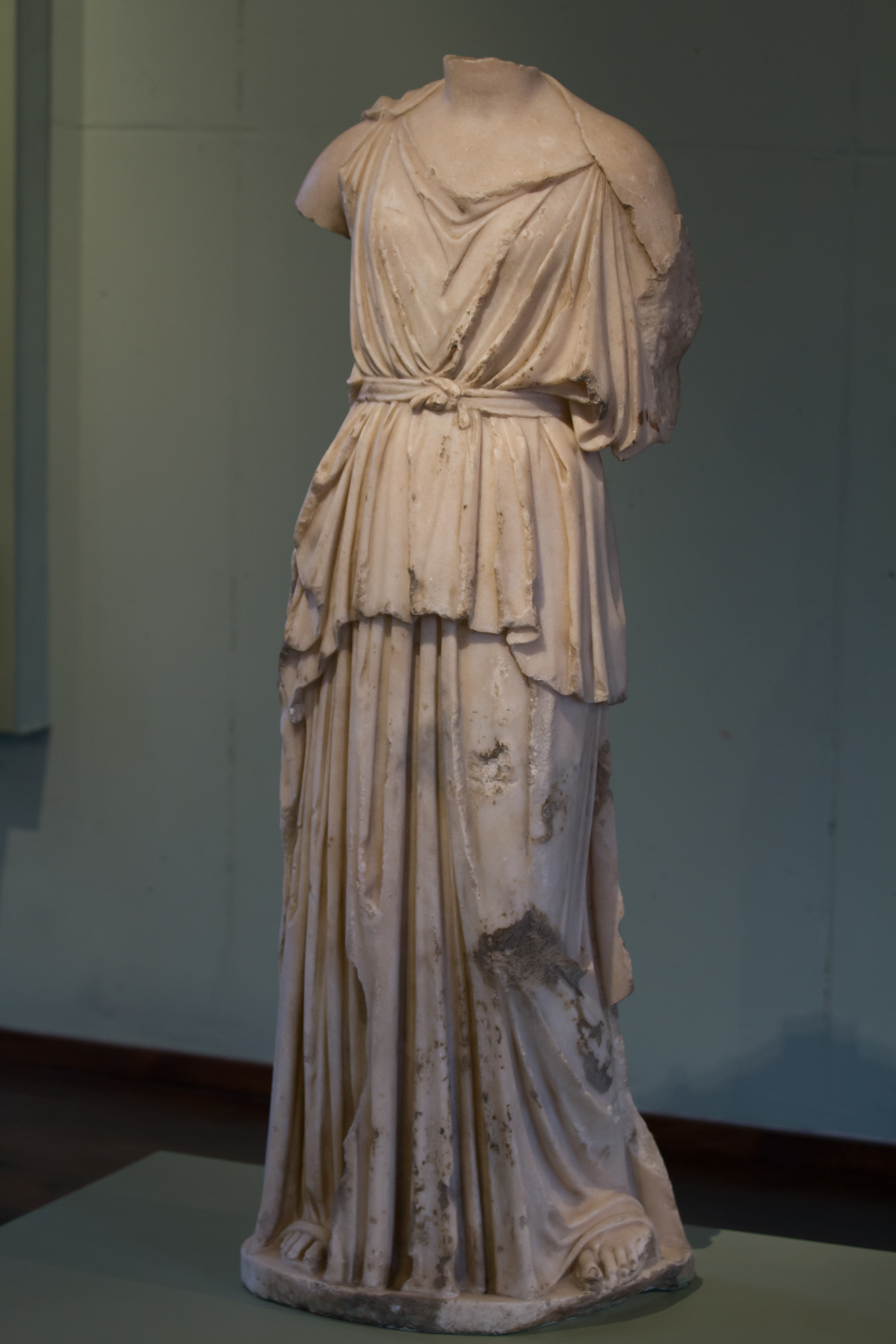
Greek Minerva sculpture

Athena-Minerva

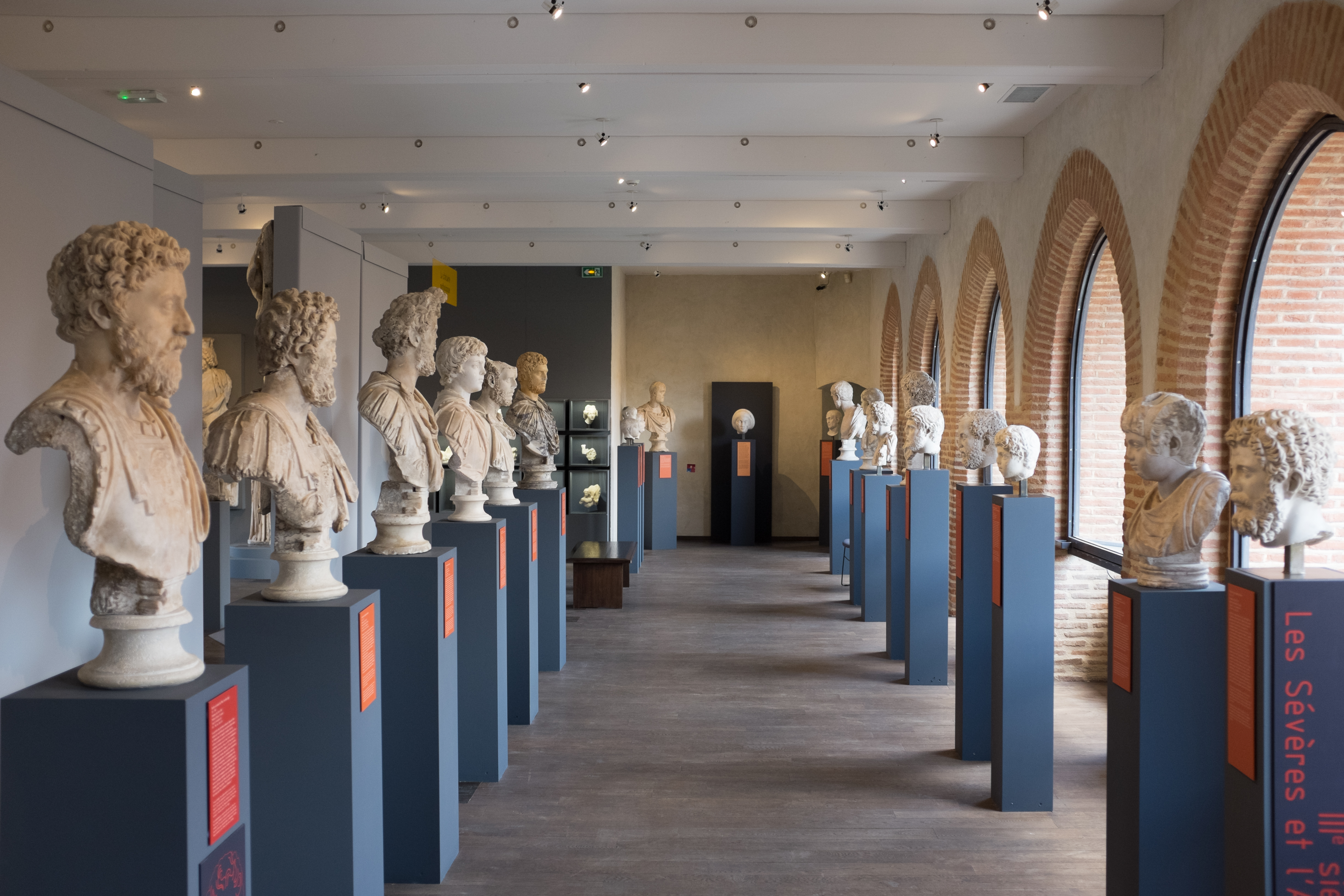
Roman busts from the Roman villa of Chiragan.

== Attendance ==
Graph showing museum attendance between 2001 and 2018.

== Other missions ==
Besides displaying its collections, the Musée Saint-Raymond manages the following archaeological and historical sites:

- Roman Amphitheater at Toulouse-Purpan and the thermae in the Ancely (fr) quarter
- Saint-Pierre des Cuisines Church
- Basilica of Saint-Sernin
