= Cluzel =

Cluzel is a French surname. It derives from the Occitan clusèl, meaning 'small enclosure', 'small enclosed space'. Notable people with the surname include:

- Jean Cluzel (1923–2020), French politician
- Jean-Paul Cluzel (born 1947), French politician
- Jules Cluzel (born 1988), French motorcycle racer
- Sophie Cluzel (born 1961), French politician
