= Raymond of Toulouse (saint) =

French Roman Catholic saint

Saint Raymond of Toulouse
- Born: Toulouse, France
- Died: 3 July 1118; Toulouse, France
- Venerated in: Roman Catholic Church
- Major shrine: Basilica of St. Sernin, Toulouse
- Feast: 8 July

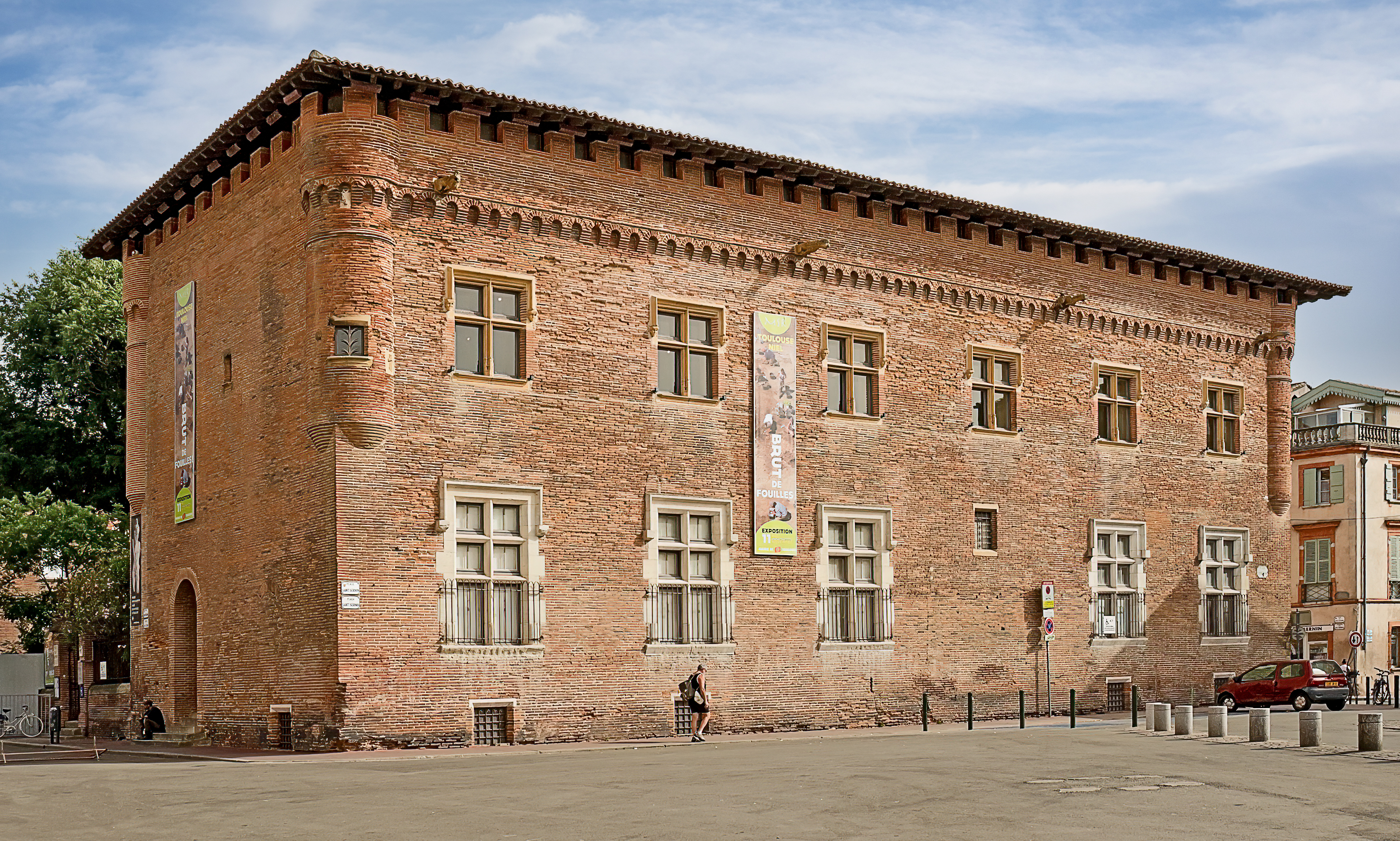
Old hospital of St. Raymond, now museum, new building of the fifteenth century.

Raymond of Toulouse, also known as Raymond Gayrard, was a chanter and canon renowned for generosity. A native of Toulouse, who entered religious life after the death of his wife. He became a canon of St. Sernin, Toulouse, helping to rebuild the church which became a popular place for pilgrims.

After his death on 3 July 1118, many miracles were reported at his tomb and he was beatified in 1652 by Pope Innocent X.

== See also ==
- Musée Saint-Raymond
