= Alexandre Du Mège =

French scholar

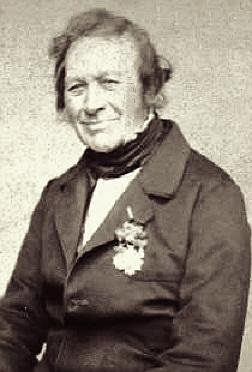
- Born: 5 December 1780; The Hague, Netherlands
- Died: 6 June 1862 (age 81); Toulouse, France
- Occupations: scholar, archaeologist, historian

Louis Charles André Alexandre Du Mège or Dumège, (The Hague (Netherlands) 5 December 1780 – Toulouse 6 June 1862), was a French scholar, archaeologist and historian.

== Life and work ==
Du Mège was born in The Hague on 5 December 1780. His father was an actor who moved to Toulouse in 1786 and from whom he inherited a collection of antiquities and a taste for numismatics and archaeology. His studies were rather limited, but he loved science, so he compensated by self study in the libraries he could frequent. He studied literature and history and after some years had enough knowledge of Latin, Greek and Hebrew for his future career as an archaeologist. As a young man he traveled the Pyrenées searching for sculptures, altars, and other antiquities of Volques Tectosages.

In 1814, the mayor of Toulouse entrusted him with the defense of the city based on instructions from Marshal Jean-de-Dieu Soult, but the army's corps of engineers did not approve his plan, a rejection for which he long held a grudge.

Du Mège was recognised for saving many antiquities of the department of Haute-Garonne and was given the responsibility of organising the sculpture collection of the Musée des Augustins in the 1830s. His archaeological hobby became a vocation. He brought a number of medieval works into the museum, specifically from the cloister of Notre-Dame de la Daurade and the portal of the chapter house of Saint-Étienne. Du Mège, the Alexandre Lenoir of Toulouse, dreamed of creating in the Augustinian monastery the southern equivalent of the Museum of French Monuments: he reconstituted false tombs or real portals, and wrote contradictory descriptions of the collection's works in successive editions of the collection catalogs he published. Du Mège's disregard for archeological facts and record keeping superseded his collecting and preservation enthusiasm. In 1831 he co-founded the Société archéologique du Midi de la France (Archaeological Society of the South of France). Then aged 50, he retrieved the antiquities and the medieval sculptures for the Musée des Augustins. A correspondent of the Académie des Inscriptions et Belles-Lettres, he created the archeological collections of the city of Toulouse.

Between 1840 and 1846 Alexandre Du Mège pursued the work of the Benedictines Devic and Vaissète by supplying a new complete edition of Histoire générale de Languedoc (General History of Languedoc) to publisher Jean-Baptiste Paya, generally considered unreliable and faulty. From 1836 to his death, he was the maintainer of the Consistori del Gay Saber.

In 1852, he imagined a Neo-Gothic decoration for the crypts of the Basilica of Saint-Sernin. It was destroyed during the resumption of restoration work in the 1960s.

In spite of the faults that can be attributed to him, especially his lack of scientific rigor, he remains one of the main founders of the archeology of southern France, a character halfway between science and myth, uniting erudition and imagination, fiction and reality.

== The Nérac affair ==
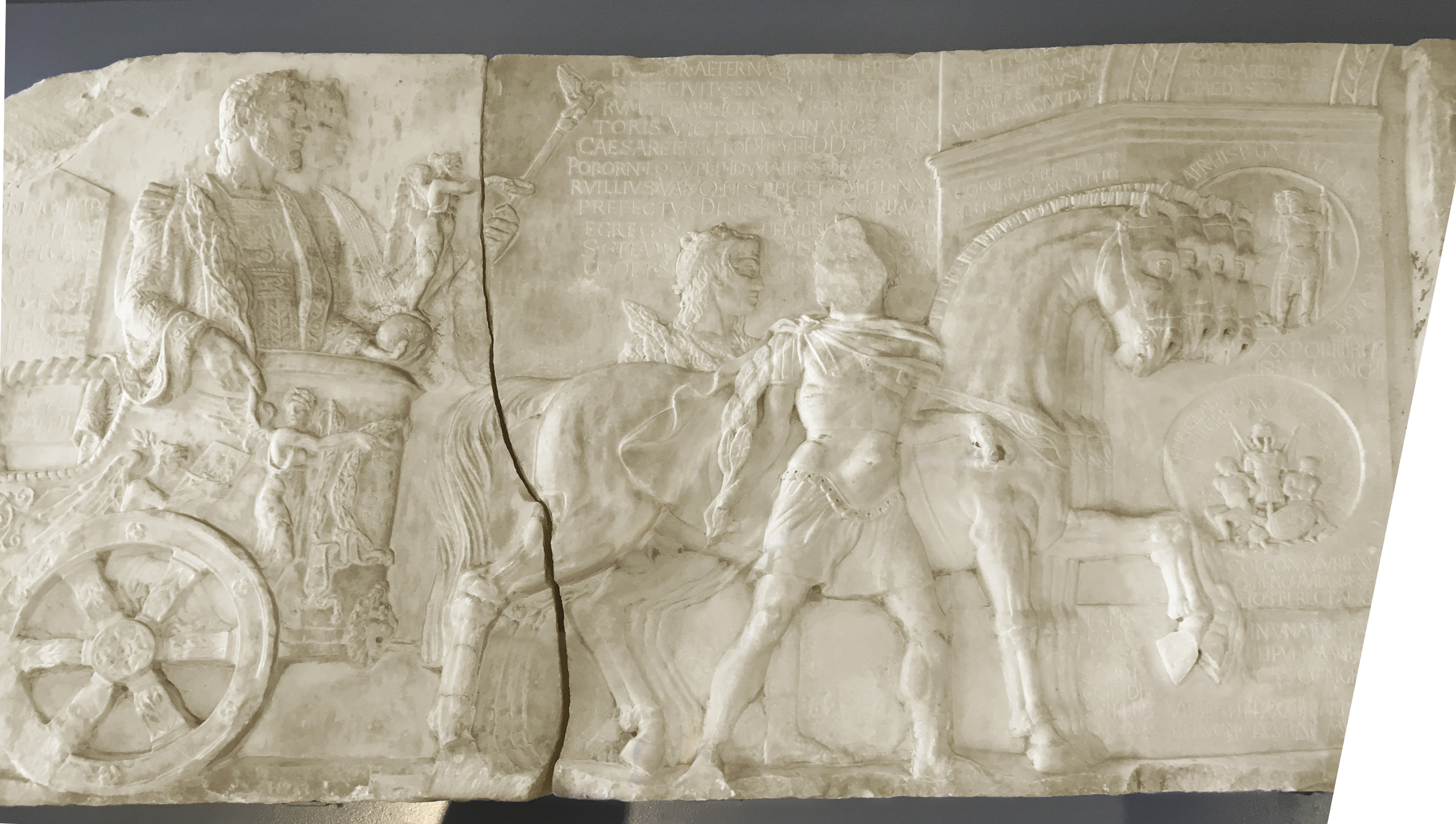
The infamous bas-relief of the Tetricus emperors.

The affair of the forged bas-relief of the Tetricus emperors found in excavations at Nérac considerably damaged Du Mège's reputation. A marble bas-relief of the two emperors was discovered in 1832 in Nérac, department of Lot-et-Garonne in a Gallo-Roman villa in the area known as La Garenne, which was excavated under the direction of sculptor and forger Maximilien Théodore Chrétin. Chrétin produced bas-reliefs and inscriptions attributed to Tetricus with the complicity of Du Mège.The authenticity of these pieces was quickly called into question and as early as 17 November 1834, the Académie des Inscriptions et Belles-Lettres proclaimed the inscriptions to be fake. Several of the inscriptions alluded to the existence of a certain "Néra", supposedly the wife of Tetricus I. In a note in the Acts of the SAM (Note: Apparently a reference to the publication of the Société Archéologique du Midi.) (p. 209 of vol. 1), Du Mège claims to have discovered this Néra before Chrétin, thus proving his involvement with the forger. This deception almost destroyed the Société Archéologique du Midi which persisted in hiding the involvement of its secretary until recently, many of its dignitaries persisting in asserting in 1841, 1865, 1889 and even until 1940 that the famous quadriga preserved in the Musée Saint-Raymond is an authentic Roman piece, except for some inscriptions added by Chrétin. In a recent work, Hubert Delpont ripped these interpretations to shreds and demonstrated conclusively the involvement of Du Mège.

== Works ==
- Monuments religieux des Volces Tectosages, des Garumni et des Convenae, ou Fragmens de l'Archaeologie pyrénéenne, Recherches sur les Antiquités du département de la Haute-Garonne, par M. Alexandre-Louis-Charles-Andre Du Mège, Toulouse, Bénichet cadet, 1814.
- Archeologie pyrénéenne, antiquités religieuses historiques, militaires, artistiques… d'une portion de la Narbonnaise et de l'Aquitaine nommée plus tard Novempopulanie, Toulouse, Delboy, 1858.
- Biographie toulousaine ou dictionnaire historique des personnages qui par des vertus, des talens, des écrits, de grandes actions, des fondations utiles, des opinions singulières, des erreurs, etc, se sont rendus célèbres dans la ville de Toulouse, ou qui ont contribué à son illustration, Paris, Michaud, 1823.
- Description du Musée des antiques de Toulouse by M. Alexandre Du Mège, Toulouse, Impr. Jean-Matthieu Douladoure, 1835.
- Statistique générale des départemens pyrénéens, ou des provinces de Guienne et de Languedoc by M. Alexandre Du Mège, Paris, Treuttel et Wurtz, 1828–1829.
- Histoire des institutions religieuses, politiques, judiciaires et littéraires de la ville de Toulouse, Toulouse, L. Chapelle, 1844–1846
- Précis historique de la bataille de Toulouse livrée le 10 avril 1814, entre l'armée française commandée par le maréchal Soult, duc de Dalmatie et l'armee alliée, sous les ordres de lord Wellington, par le chevalier Alex. Du Mège, Toulouse, Delboy, 1852.

== See also ==
- Musée Saint-Raymond
