= Jean-Paul Cluzel =

French politician and government official

- Born: 29 January 1947 (age 79); Paris, France
- Education: Sciences Po, ÉNA, University of Chicago,
- Occupation: Civil servant
- Spouse: Nicolas Droin (m. 2013)

Jean-Paul Cluzel (born 29 January 1947) is a French government official and politician. Among other positions, he has served as Inspector General of Finance, director of the Paris Opera, and CEO of Radio France Internationale and Radio France. He is currently the president of the entity in charge of the administration of the Grand Palais and the president of the "Réunion des musées nationaux", an entity which administers 34 national museums under the authority of the French Ministry of Culture. He is also openly gay, advocates for LGBT rights, and supports AIDS-related campaigns.

== Early life ==
Cluzel was born on January 29, 1947, and lived in Le Kremlin-Bicêtre, a suburb of Paris, France, until he was 14. His parents worked in a hardware store. He studied in the École nationale d'administration from 1970 until 1972, the Institut d'Études Politiques de Paris, Panthéon-Assas University, and the University of Chicago, where he received a Master of Arts.
