= Canton of Nomeny =

Former canton in Meurthe-et-Moselle, France

Coordinates: 48°52′40″N 6°11′29″E

- Former canton
- Location of the canton in the arrondissement of Nancy
- Country: France
- Region: Grand Est
- Department: Meurthe-et-Moselle
- No. of communes: {{{nbcomm}}}
- Disbanded: 2015

Government
  - Representatives: Antony Caps
- Area: 188.79 km^{2} (72.89 sq mi)
- Population (2011): 10,523
  - Density: 55.739/km^{2} (144.36/sq mi)

The canton of Nomeny (French: Canton de Nomeny) is a former French canton located in the department of Meurthe-et-Moselle in the Lorraine region (now part of Grand Est). This canton was organized around Nomeny in the arrondissement of Nancy. It is now part of the canton of Entre Seille et Meurthe.

The last general councillor from this canton was Antony Caps (EELV), elected in 2011.

== Composition ==
The canton of Nomeny grouped together 25 municipalities and had 10,560 inhabitants (2012 census without double counts).

1. Abaucourt
2. Armaucourt
3. Arraye-et-Han
4. Belleau
5. Bey-sur-Seille
6. Bratte
7. Chenicourt
8. Clémery
9. Éply
10. Faulx
11. Jeandelaincourt
12. Lanfroicourt
13. Létricourt
14. Leyr
15. Mailly-sur-Seille
16. Malleloy
17. Moivrons
18. Montenoy
19. Nomeny
20. Phlin
21. Raucourt
22. Rouves
23. Sivry
24. Thézey-Saint-Martin
25. Villers-lès-Moivrons
