= Autreville =

Autreville may refer to the following places in France:

- Autreville, Aisne, a commune in the department of Aisne
- Autreville, Vosges, a commune in the department of Vosges
- Autréville-Saint-Lambert, a commune in the department of Meuse
- Autreville-sur-la-Renne, a commune in the department of Haute-Marne
- Autreville-sur-Moselle, a commune in the department of Meurthe-et-Moselle
