= Morville-sur-Seille =

- Commune
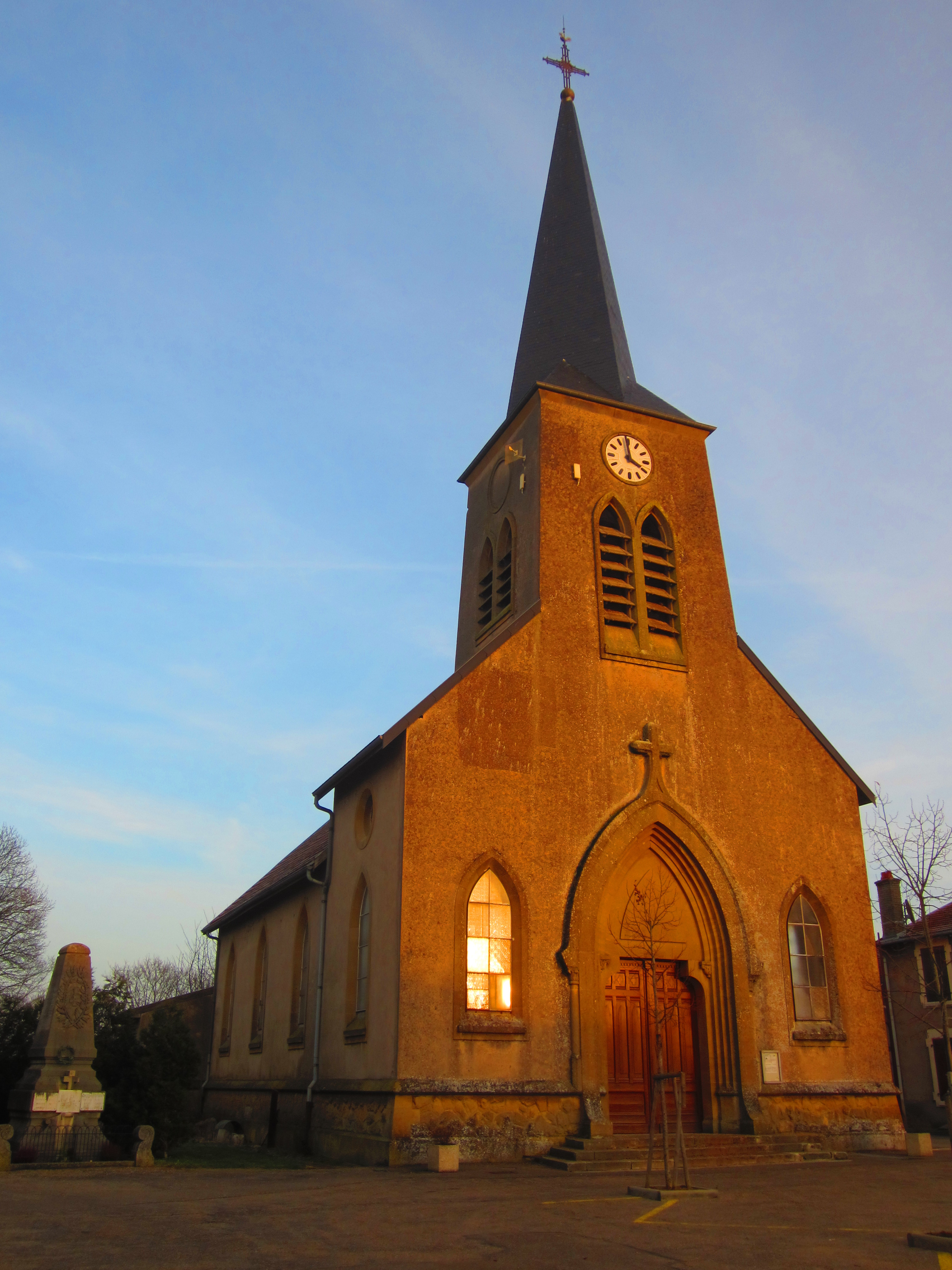
- The church in Morville-sur-Seille

- Coat of arms
- Location of Morville-sur-Seille
- Location within France Location within Grand Est
- Coordinates: 48°55′03″N 6°09′25″E
- Country: France
- Region: Grand Est
- Department: Meurthe-et-Moselle
- Arrondissement: Nancy
- Canton: Entre Seille et Meurthe
- Intercommunality: CC Bassin de Pont-à-Mousson

Government
  - Mayor (2020–2026): Guy Vuébat
- Area^{1}: 5.34 km^{2} (2.06 sq mi)
- Elevation: 198 m (650 ft)
- Highest elevation: 236 m (774 ft)
- Lowest elevation: 177 m (581 ft)
- Population (2023): 169
  - Density: 31.6/km^{2} (82.0/sq mi)
- Time zone: UTC+01:00 (CET)
  - Summer (DST): UTC+02:00 (CEST)
- INSEE/Postal code: 54387 /54700
- ^{1} French Land Register data, which excludes lakes, ponds, glaciers > 1 km^{2} (0.386 sq mi or 247 acres) and river estuaries.

Morville-sur-Seille (French pronunciation: [mɔʁvil syʁ sɛj], literally Morville on Seille) is a commune in the Meurthe-et-Moselle department in north-eastern France.

== See also ==
- Communes of the Meurthe-et-Moselle department
