= Sainte-Geneviève, Meurthe-et-Moselle =

Sainte-Geneviève
- Commune
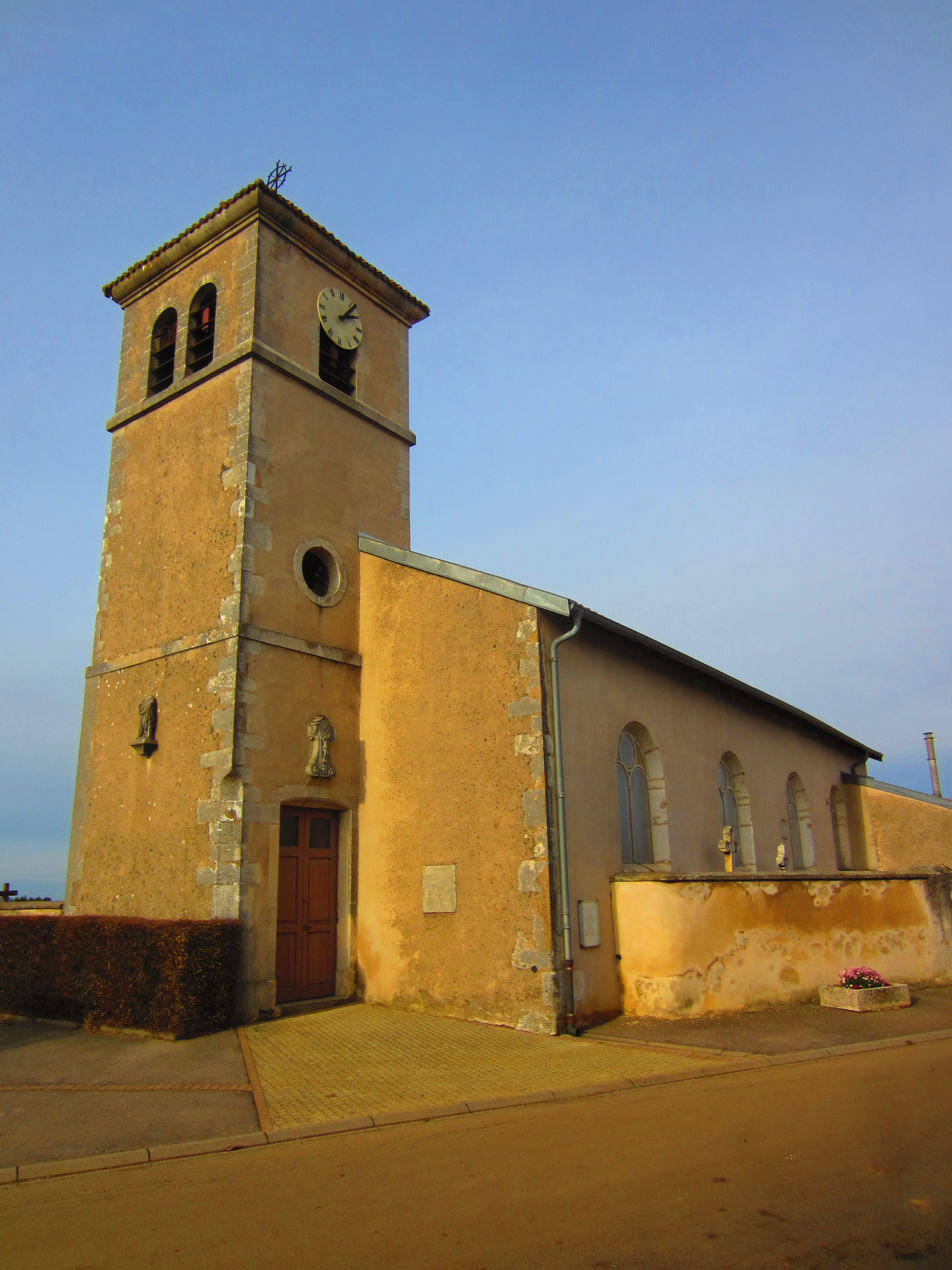
- The church in Sainte-Geneviève

- Coat of arms
- Location of Sainte-Geneviève
- Location within France Location within Grand Est
- Coordinates: 48°52′16″N 6°06′59″E
- Country: France
- Region: Grand Est
- Department: Meurthe-et-Moselle
- Arrondissement: Nancy
- Canton: Entre Seille et Meurthe
- Intercommunality: Bassin de Pont-à-Mousson

Government
  - Mayor (2020–2026): Loïc Fortel
- Area^{1}: 7.14 km^{2} (2.76 sq mi)
- Elevation: 336 m (1,102 ft)
- Highest elevation: 376 m (1,234 ft)
- Lowest elevation: 197 m (646 ft)
- Population (2023): 184
  - Density: 25.8/km^{2} (66.7/sq mi)
- Time zone: UTC+01:00 (CET)
  - Summer (DST): UTC+02:00 (CEST)
- INSEE/Postal code: 54474 /54700
- ^{1} French Land Register data, which excludes lakes, ponds, glaciers > 1 km^{2} (0.386 sq mi or 247 acres) and river estuaries.

Sainte-Geneviève (French pronunciation: [sɛ̃t ʒənvjɛv]) is a commune in the Meurthe-et-Moselle department in north-eastern France.

== See also ==
- Communes of the Meurthe-et-Moselle department
