= Millery, Meurthe-et-Moselle =

Millery
- Commune
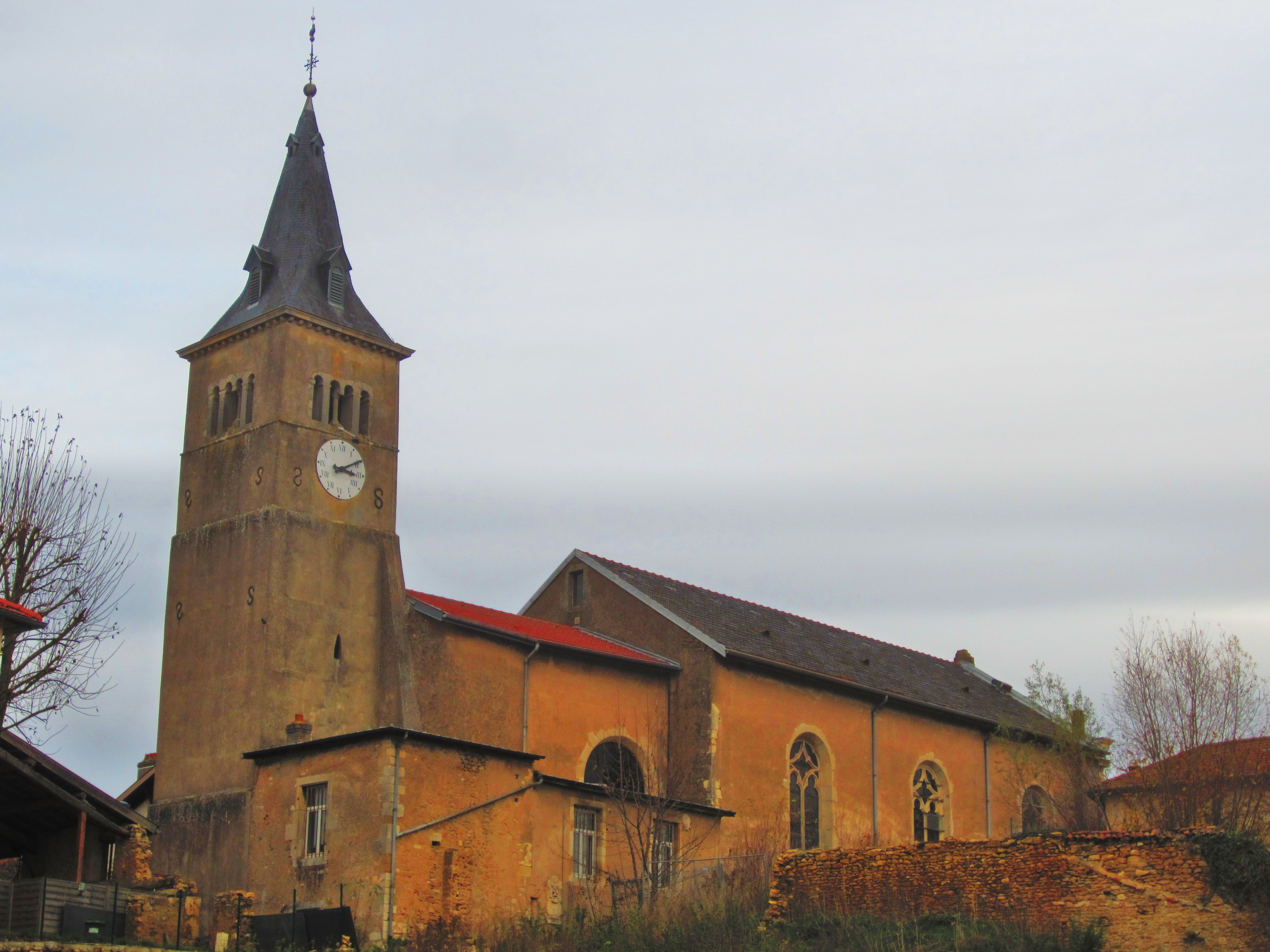
- The church in Millery

- Coat of arms
- Location of Millery
- Location within France Location within Grand Est
- Coordinates: 48°49′04″N 6°07′52″E
- Country: France
- Region: Grand Est
- Department: Meurthe-et-Moselle
- Arrondissement: Nancy
- Canton: Entre Seille et Meurthe
- Intercommunality: CC Bassin de Pompey

Government
  - Mayor (2024–2026): Guillaume Poinsot
- Area^{1}: 7.48 km^{2} (2.89 sq mi)
- Elevation: 182 m (597 ft)
- Highest elevation: 392 m (1,286 ft)
- Lowest elevation: 183 m (600 ft)
- Population (2023): 599
  - Density: 80.1/km^{2} (207/sq mi)
- Time zone: UTC+01:00 (CET)
  - Summer (DST): UTC+02:00 (CEST)
- INSEE/Postal code: 54369 /54670
- ^{1} French Land Register data, which excludes lakes, ponds, glaciers > 1 km^{2} (0.386 sq mi or 247 acres) and river estuaries.

Millery is a commune in the Meurthe-et-Moselle department in north-eastern France.

== History ==
During World War II, on Saturday, 29 July 1944, an RAF Avro Lancaster Type B III bomber (s/n ND756 AA°M), while on a mission to the German city of Stuttgart, was shot down by Luftwaffe night fighters and crashed at 1:25 a.m. on the Falaise hill near Millery. Out of the seven crew members, four died — including three from New Zealand and one British — and were buried in the village cemetery, where their graves can still be seen.

== See also ==
- Communes of the Meurthe-et-Moselle department
