= Port-sur-Seille =

- Commune
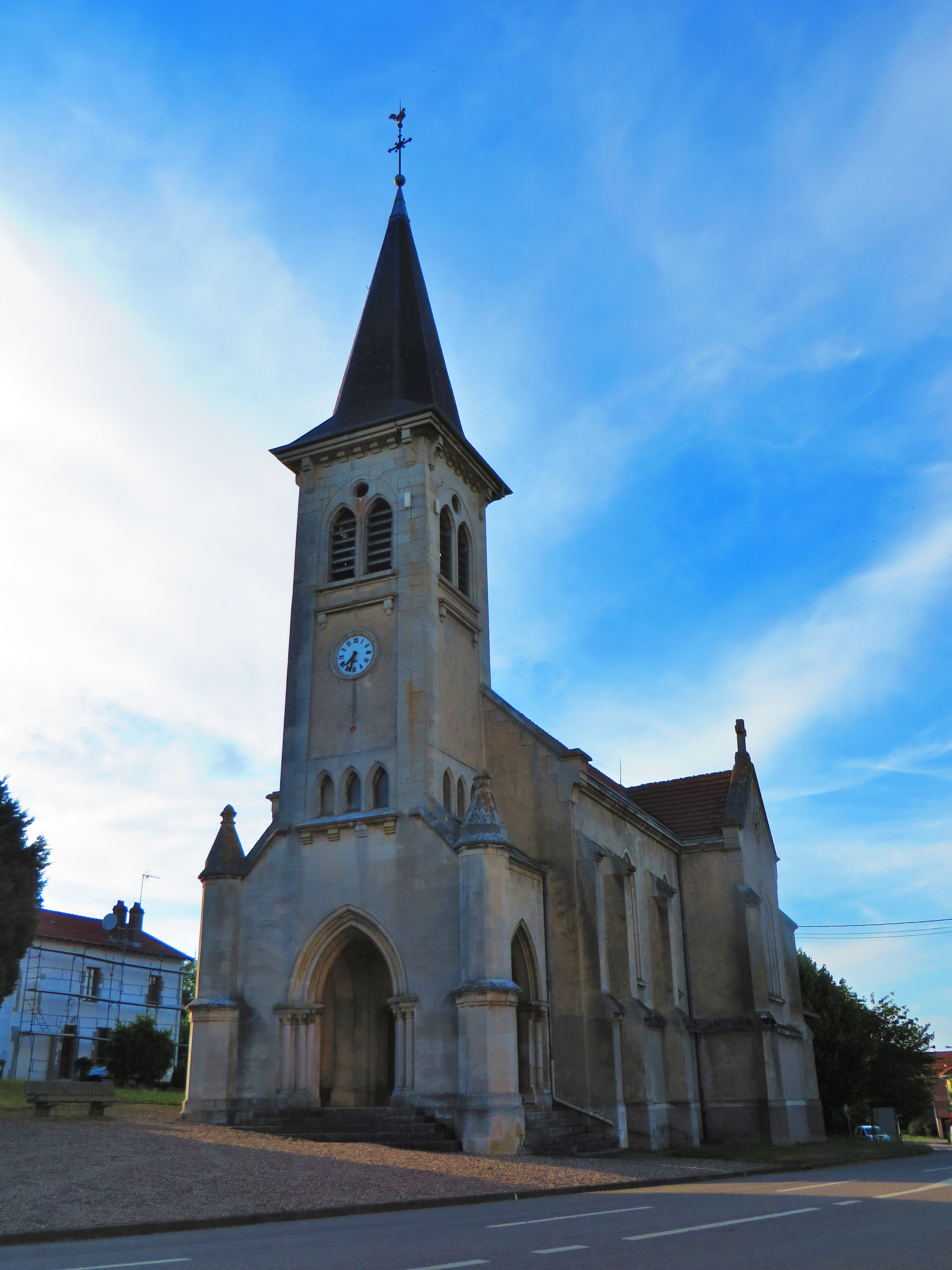
- The church in Port-sur-Seille

- Coat of arms
- Location of Port-sur-Seille
- Location within France Location within Grand Est
- Coordinates: 48°54′09″N 6°09′51″E
- Country: France
- Region: Grand Est
- Department: Meurthe-et-Moselle
- Arrondissement: Nancy
- Canton: Entre Seille et Meurthe
- Intercommunality: CC Bassin de Pont-à-Mousson

Government
  - Mayor (2020–2026): Richard Geoffroy
- Area^{1}: 6.37 km^{2} (2.46 sq mi)
- Elevation: 183 m (600 ft)
- Highest elevation: 228 m (748 ft)
- Lowest elevation: 177 m (581 ft)
- Population (2023): 232
  - Density: 36.4/km^{2} (94.3/sq mi)
- Time zone: UTC+01:00 (CET)
  - Summer (DST): UTC+02:00 (CEST)
- INSEE/Postal code: 54433 /54700
- ^{1} French Land Register data, which excludes lakes, ponds, glaciers > 1 km^{2} (0.386 sq mi or 247 acres) and river estuaries.

Port-sur-Seille (French pronunciation: [pɔʁ syʁ sɛj]) is a commune in the Meurthe-et-Moselle department in north-eastern France.

== See also ==
- Communes of the Meurthe-et-Moselle department
