= Brin-sur-Seille =

- Commune
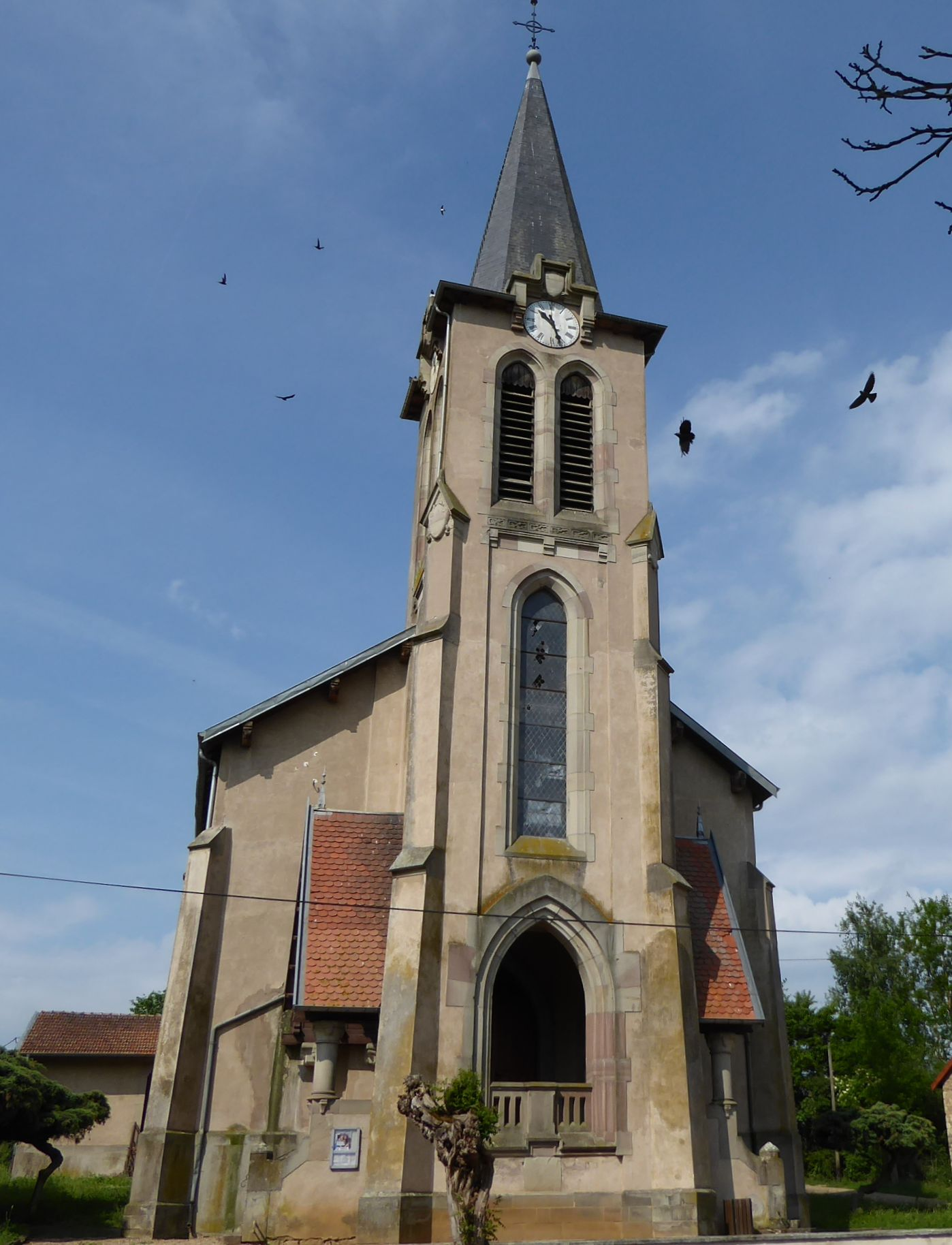
- The church in Brin-sur-Seille

- Coat of arms
- Location of Brin-sur-Seille
- Location within France Location within Grand Est
- Coordinates: 48°46′47″N 6°21′20″E
- Country: France
- Region: Grand Est
- Department: Meurthe-et-Moselle
- Arrondissement: Nancy
- Canton: Entre Seille et Meurthe
- Intercommunality: Seille et Grand Couronné

Government
  - Mayor (2020–2026): Alain Holzer
- Area^{1}: 11.71 km^{2} (4.52 sq mi)
- Elevation: 240 m (790 ft)
- Highest elevation: 263 m (863 ft)
- Lowest elevation: 193 m (633 ft)
- Population (2023): 764
  - Density: 65.2/km^{2} (169/sq mi)
- Time zone: UTC+01:00 (CET)
  - Summer (DST): UTC+02:00 (CEST)
- INSEE/Postal code: 54100 /54280
- ^{1} French Land Register data, which excludes lakes, ponds, glaciers > 1 km^{2} (0.386 sq mi or 247 acres) and river estuaries.

Brin-sur-Seille (French pronunciation: [bʁɛ̃ syʁ sɛj], literally Brin on Seille) is a commune in the Meurthe-et-Moselle department in northeastern France.

== Population ==
Historical population
Year	Pop.	±% p.a.
1968	556	—
1975	549	−0.18%
1982	603	+1.35%
1990	601	−0.04%
1999	582	−0.36%
2007	634	+1.08%
2012	715	+2.43%
2017	783	+1.83%
2023	764	−0.41%
Source: INSEE

== See also ==
- Communes of the Meurthe-et-Moselle department
