= Bezaumont =

- Commune
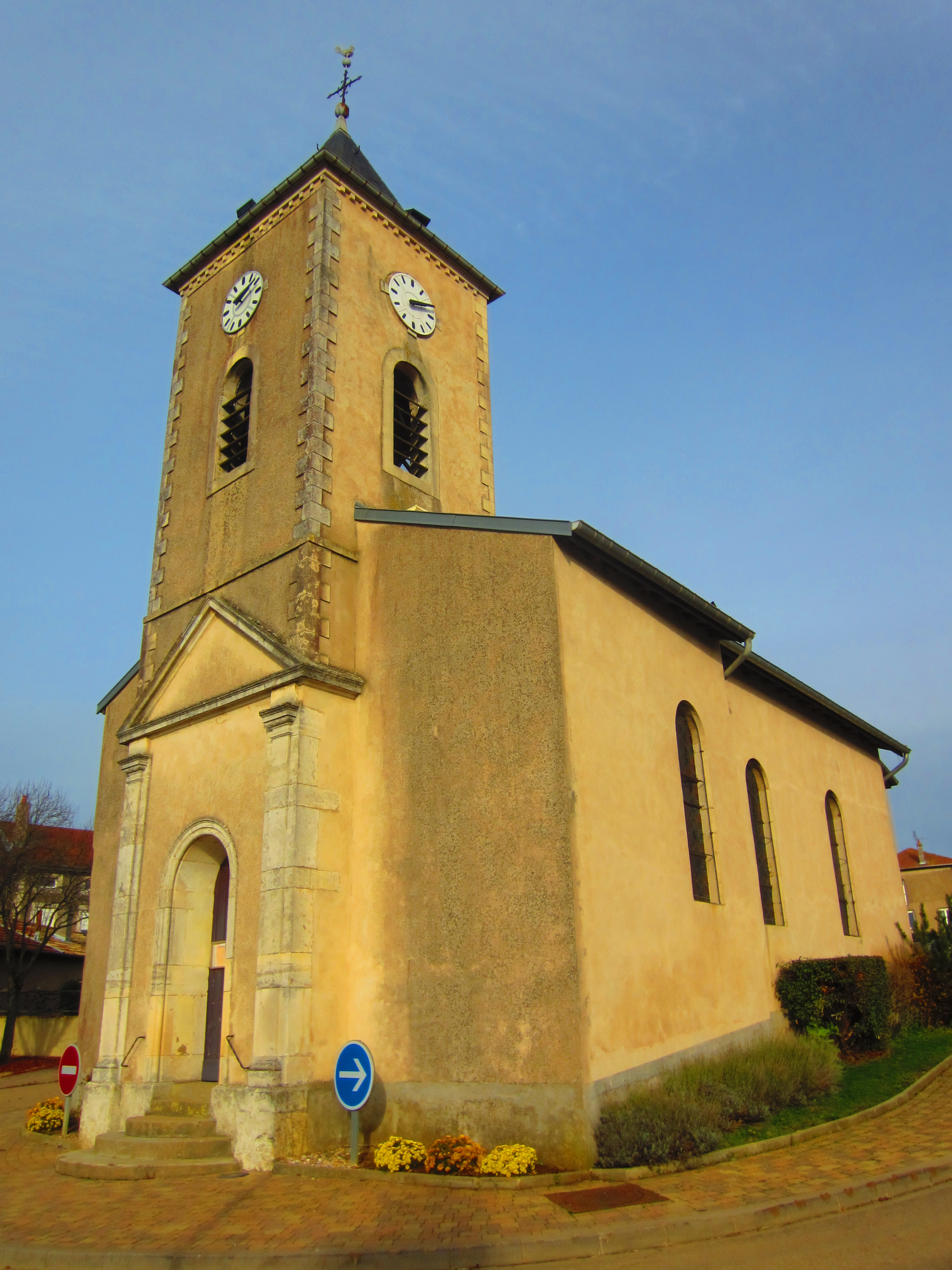
- The church in Bezaumont

- Coat of arms
- Location of Bezaumont
- Location within France Location within Grand Est
- Coordinates: 48°51′13″N 6°06′41″E
- Country: France
- Region: Grand Est
- Department: Meurthe-et-Moselle
- Arrondissement: Nancy
- Canton: Entre Seille et Meurthe
- Intercommunality: Bassin de Pont-à-Mousson

Government
  - Mayor (2020–2026): Didier Lombard
- Area^{1}: 4.26 km^{2} (1.64 sq mi)
- Elevation: 293 m (961 ft)
- Highest elevation: 376 m (1,234 ft)
- Lowest elevation: 179 m (587 ft)
- Population (2023): 258
  - Density: 60.6/km^{2} (157/sq mi)
- Time zone: UTC+01:00 (CET)
  - Summer (DST): UTC+02:00 (CEST)
- INSEE/Postal code: 54072 /54380
- ^{1} French Land Register data, which excludes lakes, ponds, glaciers > 1 km^{2} (0.386 sq mi or 247 acres) and river estuaries.

Bezaumont (French pronunciation: [bəzomɔ̃]) is a commune in the Meurthe-et-Moselle department in northeastern France.

== Population ==
Historical population
Year	Pop.	±% p.a.
1968	192	—
1975	187	−0.38%
1982	232	+3.13%
1990	225	−0.38%
1999	249	+1.13%
2007	257	+0.40%
2012	240	−1.36%
2017	263	+1.85%
2023	258	−0.32%
Source: INSEE

== See also ==
- Communes of the Meurthe-et-Moselle department
