= Moivrons =

- Commune
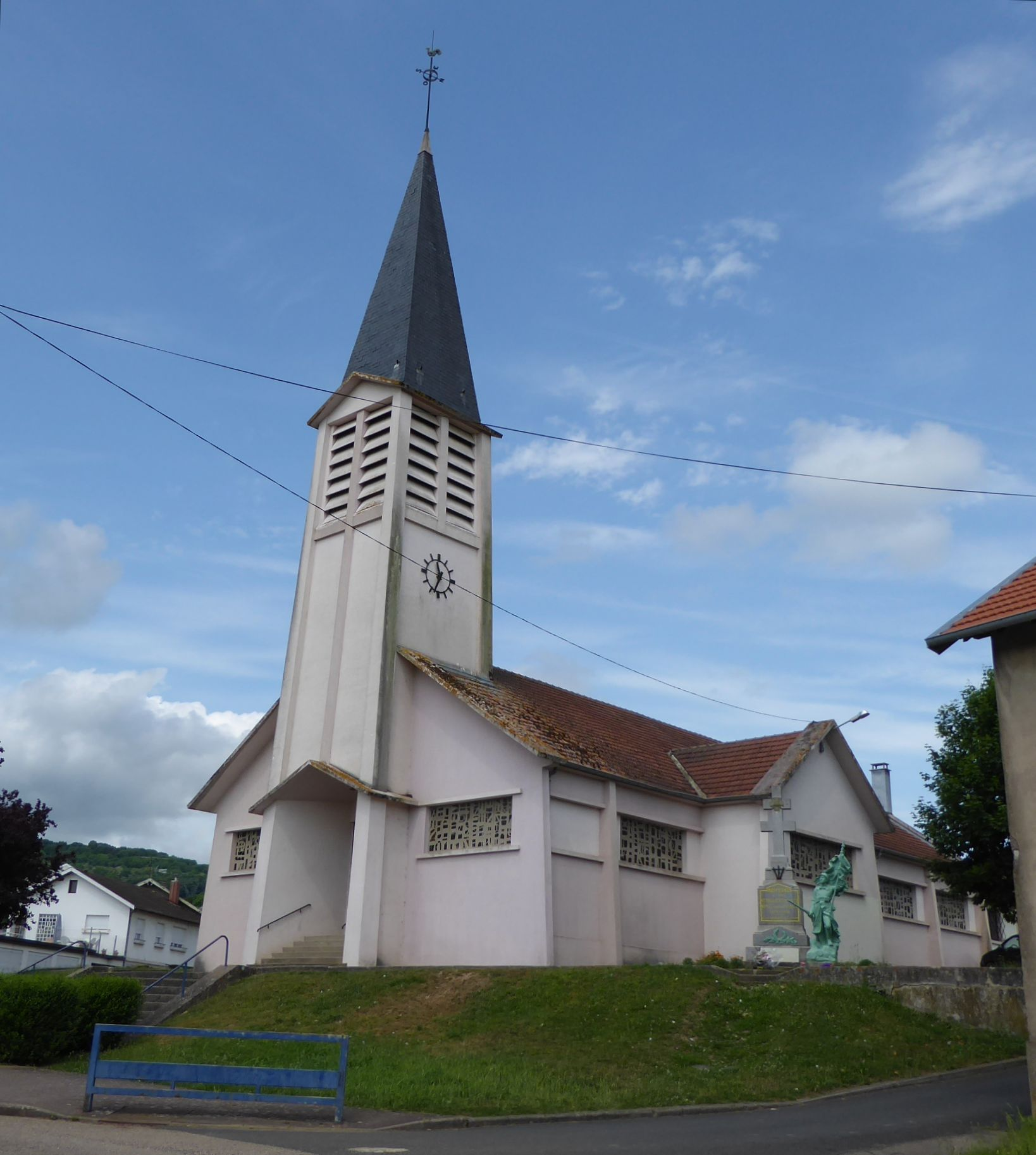
- The church in Moivrons

- Coat of arms
- Location of Moivrons
- Location within France Location within Grand Est
- Coordinates: 48°49′27″N 6°14′59″E
- Country: France
- Region: Grand Est
- Department: Meurthe-et-Moselle
- Arrondissement: Nancy
- Canton: Entre Seille et Meurthe

Government
  - Mayor (2020–2026): Geoffrey Guillaume
- Area^{1}: 6 km^{2} (2.3 sq mi)
- Elevation: 278 m (912 ft)
- Highest elevation: 403 m (1,322 ft)
- Lowest elevation: 212 m (696 ft)
- Population (2023): 528
  - Density: 88/km^{2} (230/sq mi)
- Time zone: UTC+01:00 (CET)
  - Summer (DST): UTC+02:00 (CEST)
- INSEE/Postal code: 54372 /54760
- ^{1} French Land Register data, which excludes lakes, ponds, glaciers > 1 km^{2} (0.386 sq mi or 247 acres) and river estuaries.

Moivrons (French pronunciation: [mwavʁɔ̃]) is a commune in the Meurthe-et-Moselle department in north-eastern France.

== See also ==
- Communes of the Meurthe-et-Moselle department
