= Bey-sur-Seille =

- Commune
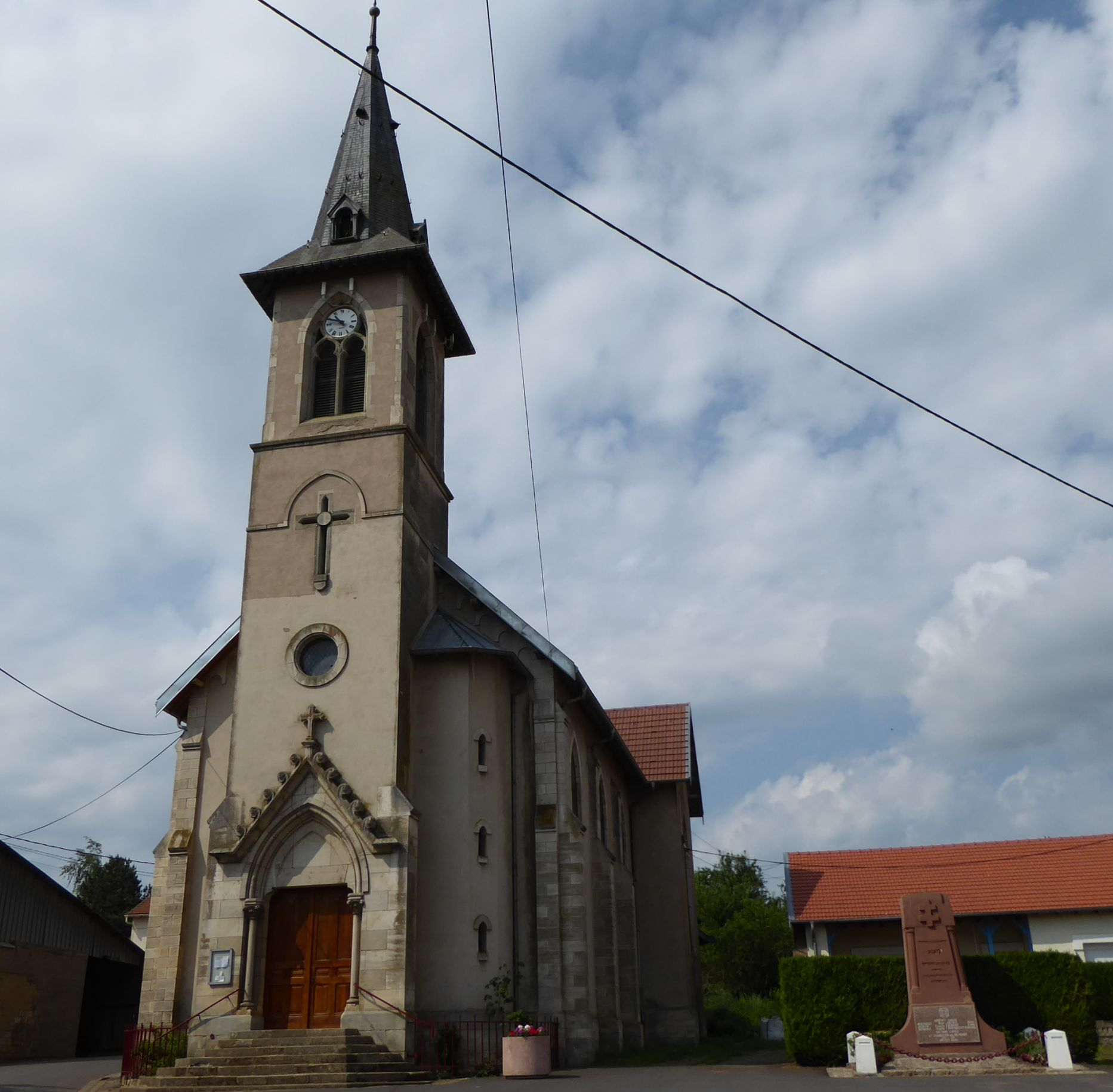
- The church in Bey-sur-Seille

- Coat of arms
- Location of Bey-sur-Seille
- Location within France Location within Grand Est
- Coordinates: 48°48′18″N 6°20′34″E
- Country: France
- Region: Grand Est
- Department: Meurthe-et-Moselle
- Arrondissement: Nancy
- Canton: Entre Seille et Meurthe
- Intercommunality: Seille et Grand Couronné

Government
  - Mayor (2022–2026): Daniel Grandadam
- Area^{1}: 5.53 km^{2} (2.14 sq mi)
- Elevation: 200 m (660 ft)
- Highest elevation: 243 m (797 ft)
- Lowest elevation: 195 m (640 ft)
- Population (2023): 196
  - Density: 35.4/km^{2} (91.8/sq mi)
- Time zone: UTC+01:00 (CET)
  - Summer (DST): UTC+02:00 (CEST)
- INSEE/Postal code: 54070 /54760
- ^{1} French Land Register data, which excludes lakes, ponds, glaciers > 1 km^{2} (0.386 sq mi or 247 acres) and river estuaries.

Bey-sur-Seille (French pronunciation: [bɛ syʁ sɛj], literally Bey on Seille) is a commune in the Meurthe-et-Moselle department in eastern France.

== Population ==
Historical population
Year	Pop.	±% p.a.
1968	94	—
1975	96	+0.30%
1982	107	+1.56%
1990	130	+2.46%
1999	167	+2.82%
2007	156	−0.85%
2012	156	+0.00%
2017	169	+1.61%
2023	196	+2.50%
Source: INSEE

== See also ==
- Communes of the Meurthe-et-Moselle department
