= Autreville-sur-Moselle =

- Commune
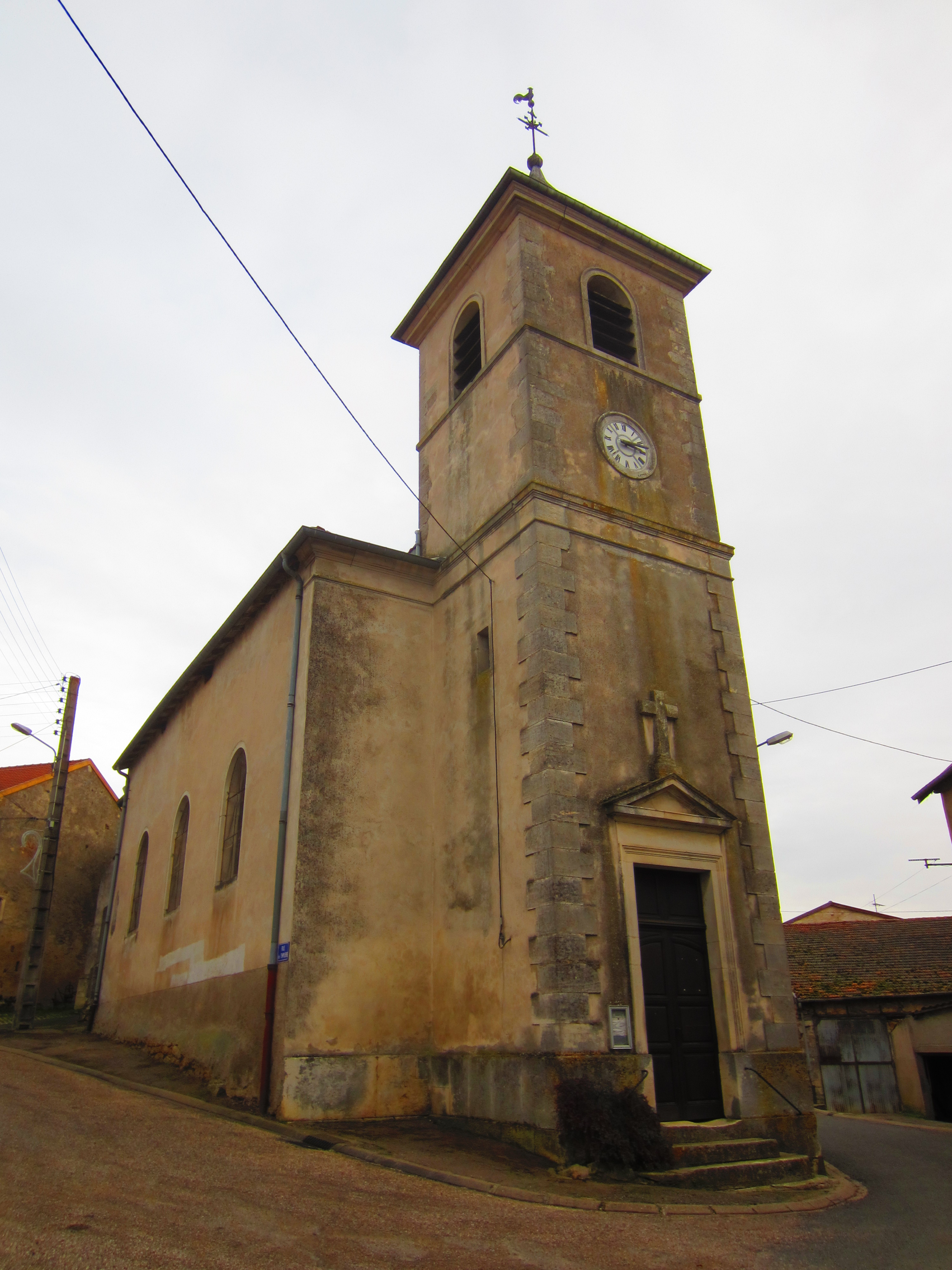
- The church in Autreville-sur-Moselle

- Coat of arms
- Location of Autreville-sur-Moselle
- Location within France Location within Grand Est
- Coordinates: 48°49′25″N 6°06′58″E
- Country: France
- Region: Grand Est
- Department: Meurthe-et-Moselle
- Arrondissement: Nancy
- Canton: Entre Seille et Meurthe
- Intercommunality: CC Bassin Pont-à-Mousson

Government
  - Mayor (2020–2026): Jean-Jacques Bic
- Area^{1}: 4.49 km^{2} (1.73 sq mi)
- Highest elevation: 377 m (1,237 ft)
- Lowest elevation: 180 m (590 ft)
- Population (2023): 264
  - Density: 58.8/km^{2} (152/sq mi)
- Time zone: UTC+01:00 (CET)
  - Summer (DST): UTC+02:00 (CEST)
- INSEE/Postal code: 54031 /54380
- ^{1} French Land Register data, which excludes lakes, ponds, glaciers > 1 km^{2} (0.386 sq mi or 247 acres) and river estuaries.

Autreville-sur-Moselle (French pronunciation: [otʁəvil syʁ mɔzɛl], literally Autreville on Moselle) is a commune in the Meurthe-et-Moselle department in northeastern France.

== History ==
Autreville-sur-Moselle is mentioned in several books about the Lorraine Campaign during World War II. The place was liberated from German occupation in early September 1944 by U.S. General George S. Patton's Third Army, especially its 3rd Battalion.^{,}

== Population ==
Historical population
Year	Pop.	±% p.a.
1968	218	—
1975	230	+0.77%
1982	252	+1.31%
1990	264	+0.58%
1999	249	−0.65%
2007	301	+2.40%
2012	264	−2.59%
2017	277	+0.97%
2023	264	−0.80%
Source: INSEE

== See also ==
- Communes of the Meurthe-et-Moselle department
