= Armaucourt =

- Commune
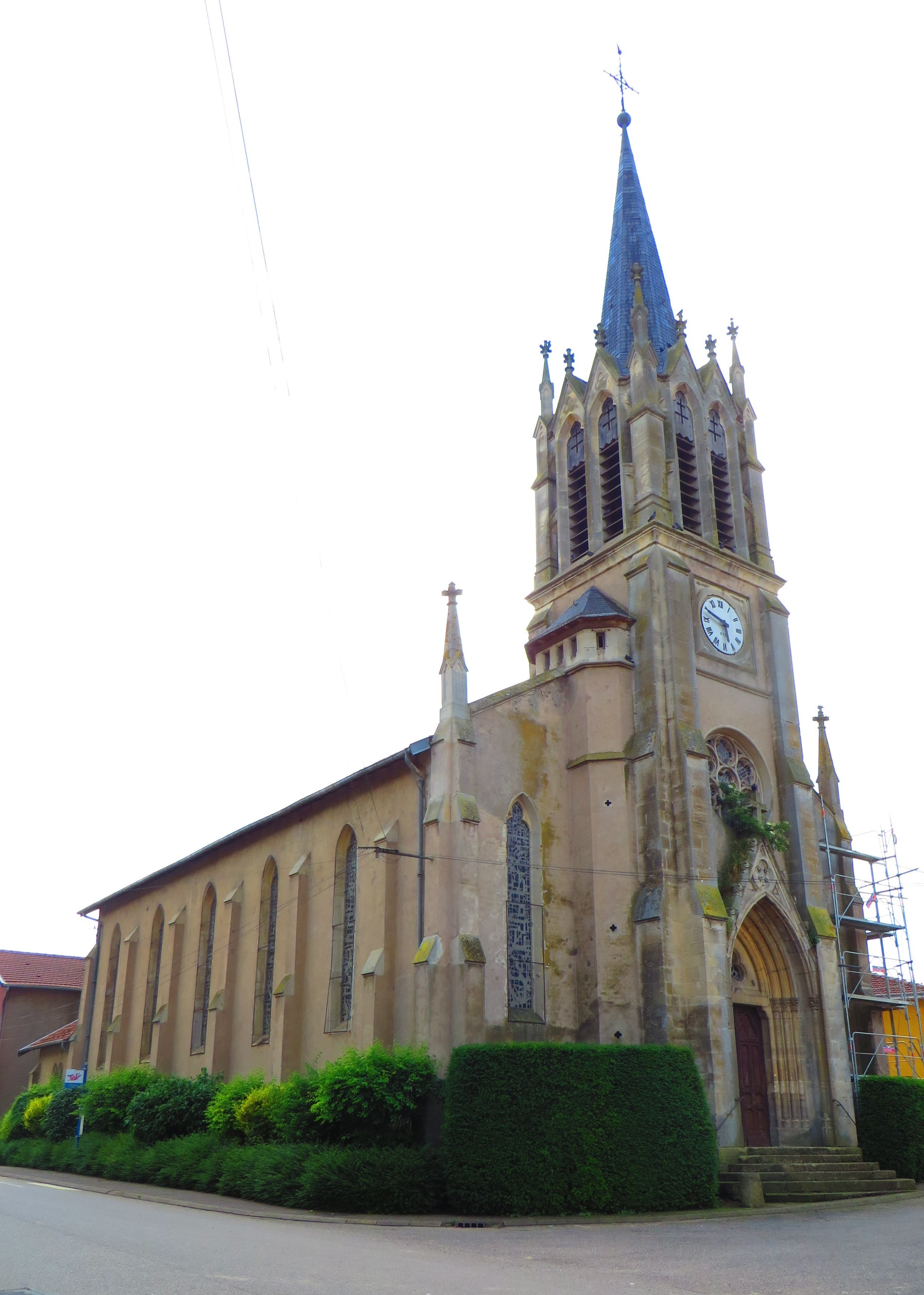
- The church in Armaucourt

- Coat of arms
- Location of Armaucourt
- Location within France Location within Grand Est
- Coordinates: 48°49′02″N 6°18′14″E
- Country: France
- Region: Grand Est
- Department: Meurthe-et-Moselle
- Arrondissement: Nancy
- Canton: Entre Seille et Meurthe
- Intercommunality: Seille et Grand Couronné

Government
  - Mayor (2020–2026): Jean-Claude Crespy
- Area^{1}: 3.72 km^{2} (1.44 sq mi)
- Elevation: 198 m (650 ft)
- Highest elevation: 222 m (728 ft)
- Lowest elevation: 192 m (630 ft)
- Population (2023): 239
  - Density: 64.2/km^{2} (166/sq mi)
- Time zone: UTC+01:00 (CET)
  - Summer (DST): UTC+02:00 (CEST)
- INSEE/Postal code: 54021 /54760
- ^{1} French Land Register data, which excludes lakes, ponds, glaciers > 1 km^{2} (0.386 sq mi or 247 acres) and river estuaries.

Armaucourt (French pronunciation: [aʁmokuʁ]) is a commune in the Meurthe-et-Moselle department in northeastern France.

== Population ==
Historical population
Year	Pop.	±% p.a.
1968	184	—
1975	189	+0.38%
1982	193	+0.30%
1990	227	+2.05%
1999	235	+0.39%
2007	215	−1.11%
2012	216	+0.09%
2017	225	+0.82%
2023	239	+1.01%
Source: INSEE

== See also ==
- Communes of the Meurthe-et-Moselle department
