= Lanfroicourt =

- Commune
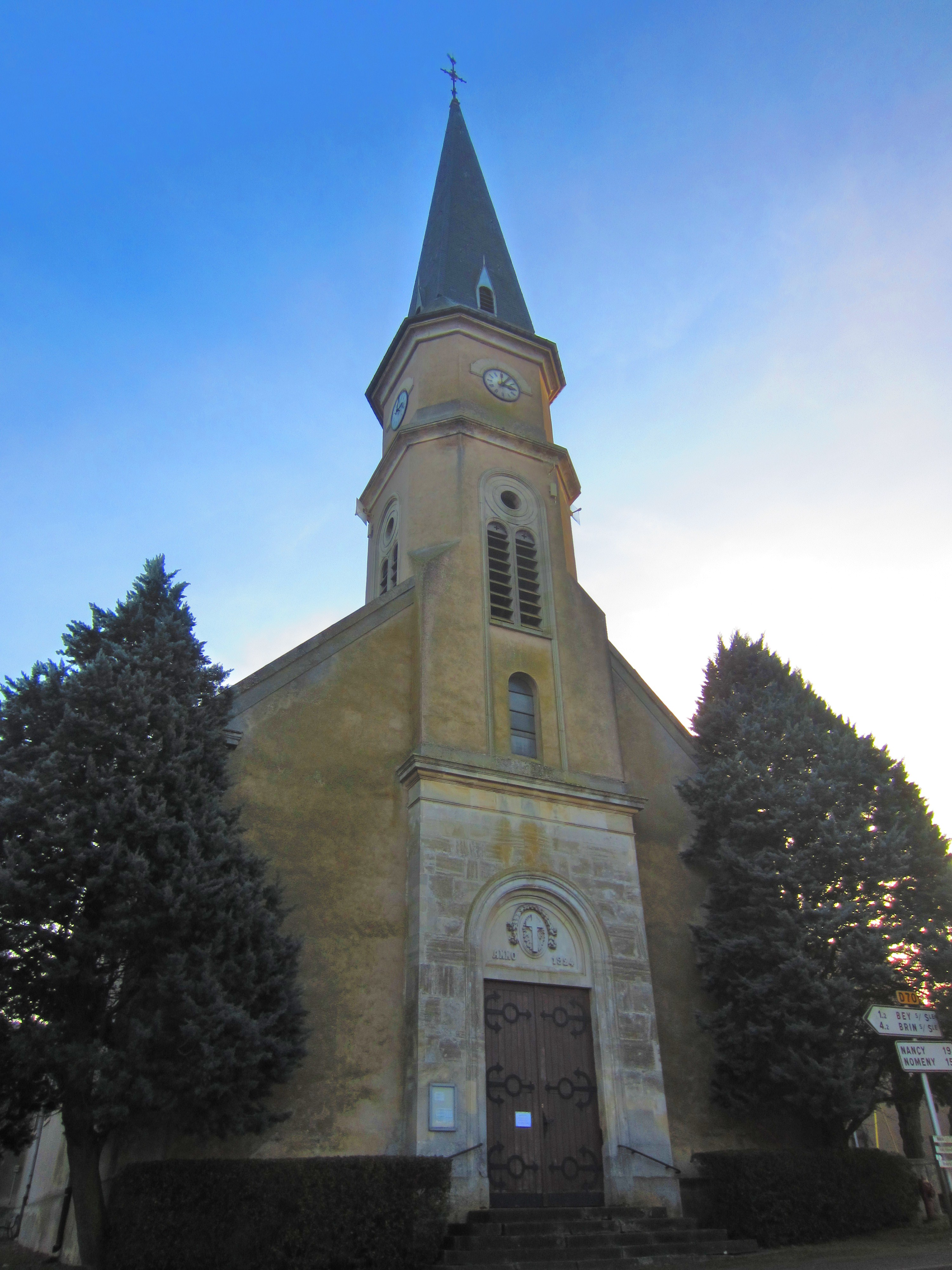
- The church in Lanfroicourt

- Coat of arms
- Location of Lanfroicourt
- Location within France Location within Grand Est
- Coordinates: 48°48′38″N 6°19′52″E
- Country: France
- Region: Grand Est
- Department: Meurthe-et-Moselle
- Arrondissement: Nancy
- Canton: Entre Seille et Meurthe
- Intercommunality: Seille et Grand Couronné

Government
  - Mayor (2020–2026): Bernard Becker
- Area^{1}: 6.19 km^{2} (2.39 sq mi)
- Elevation: 219 m (719 ft)
- Highest elevation: 243 m (797 ft)
- Lowest elevation: 194 m (636 ft)
- Population (2023): 133
  - Density: 21.5/km^{2} (55.6/sq mi)
- Time zone: UTC+01:00 (CET)
  - Summer (DST): UTC+02:00 (CEST)
- INSEE/Postal code: 54301 /54760
- ^{1} French Land Register data, which excludes lakes, ponds, glaciers > 1 km^{2} (0.386 sq mi or 247 acres) and river estuaries.

Lanfroicourt (French pronunciation: [lɑ̃fʁwakuʁ]) is a commune in the Meurthe-et-Moselle department in north-eastern France.

== Transport ==
Lanfroicourt is accessible from Nancy with the TED bus line number R360.

== See also ==
- Communes of the Meurthe-et-Moselle department
