= Sivry, Meurthe-et-Moselle =

Sivry
- Commune
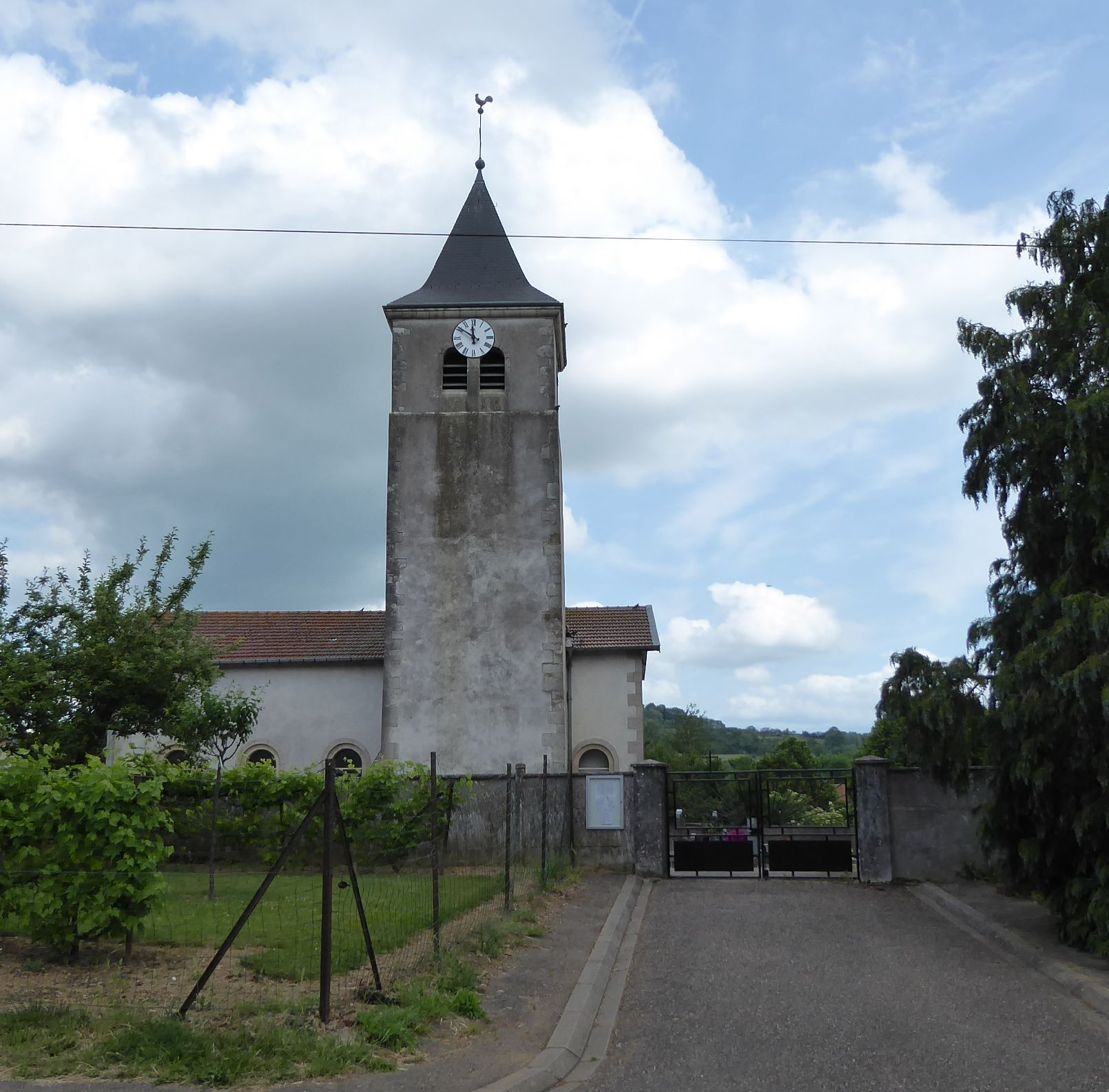
- The church in Sivry

- Coat of arms
- Location of Sivry
- Location within France Location within Grand Est
- Coordinates: 48°49′55″N 6°12′05″E
- Country: France
- Region: Grand Est
- Department: Meurthe-et-Moselle
- Arrondissement: Nancy
- Canton: Entre Seille et Meurthe
- Intercommunality: Seille et Grand Couronné

Government
  - Mayor (2020–2026): Denis Mathieu
- Area^{1}: 5.91 km^{2} (2.28 sq mi)
- Elevation: 250 m (820 ft)
- Highest elevation: 398 m (1,306 ft)
- Lowest elevation: 236 m (774 ft)
- Population (2023): 235
  - Density: 39.8/km^{2} (103/sq mi)
- Time zone: UTC+01:00 (CET)
  - Summer (DST): UTC+02:00 (CEST)
- INSEE/Postal code: 54508 /54610
- ^{1} French Land Register data, which excludes lakes, ponds, glaciers > 1 km^{2} (0.386 sq mi or 247 acres) and river estuaries.

Sivry (French pronunciation: [sivʁi]) is a commune in the Meurthe-et-Moselle department in north-eastern France.

== Population ==
Historical population
Year	Pop.	±% p.a.
1968	126	—
1975	142	+1.72%
1982	146	+0.40%
1990	165	+1.54%
1999	211	+2.77%
2007	264	+2.84%
2012	256	−0.61%
2017	257	+0.08%
2023	235	−1.48%
Source: INSEE

== See also ==
- Communes of the Meurthe-et-Moselle department
