= Malleloy =

- Commune
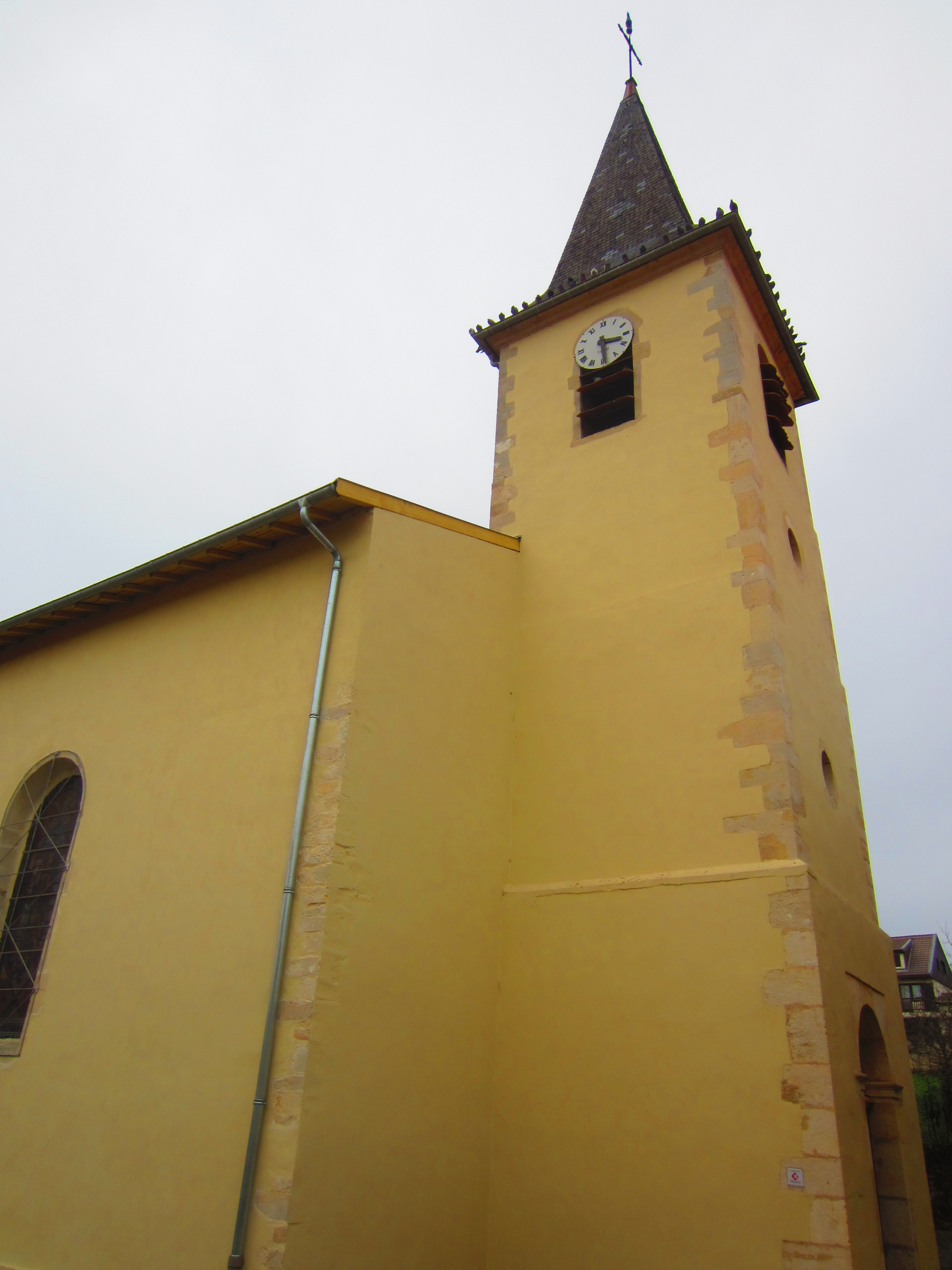
- The church in Malleloy

- Coat of arms
- Location of Malleloy
- Location within France Location within Grand Est
- Coordinates: 48°47′44″N 6°09′46″E
- Country: France
- Region: Grand Est
- Department: Meurthe-et-Moselle
- Arrondissement: Nancy
- Canton: Entre Seille et Meurthe
- Intercommunality: CC Bassin de Pompey

Government
  - Mayor (2020–2026): Denis Godefroy
- Area^{1}: 4.06 km^{2} (1.57 sq mi)
- Elevation: 211 m (692 ft)
- Highest elevation: 393 m (1,289 ft)
- Lowest elevation: 203 m (666 ft)
- Population (2023): 1,007
  - Density: 248/km^{2} (642/sq mi)
- Time zone: UTC+01:00 (CET)
  - Summer (DST): UTC+02:00 (CEST)
- INSEE/Postal code: 54338 /54670
- ^{1} French Land Register data, which excludes lakes, ponds, glaciers > 1 km^{2} (0.386 sq mi or 247 acres) and river estuaries.

Malleloy (French pronunciation: [mal(ə)lwa]) is a commune in the Meurthe-et-Moselle department in north-eastern France.

== See also ==
- Communes of the Meurthe-et-Moselle department
