= Rouves =

- Commune
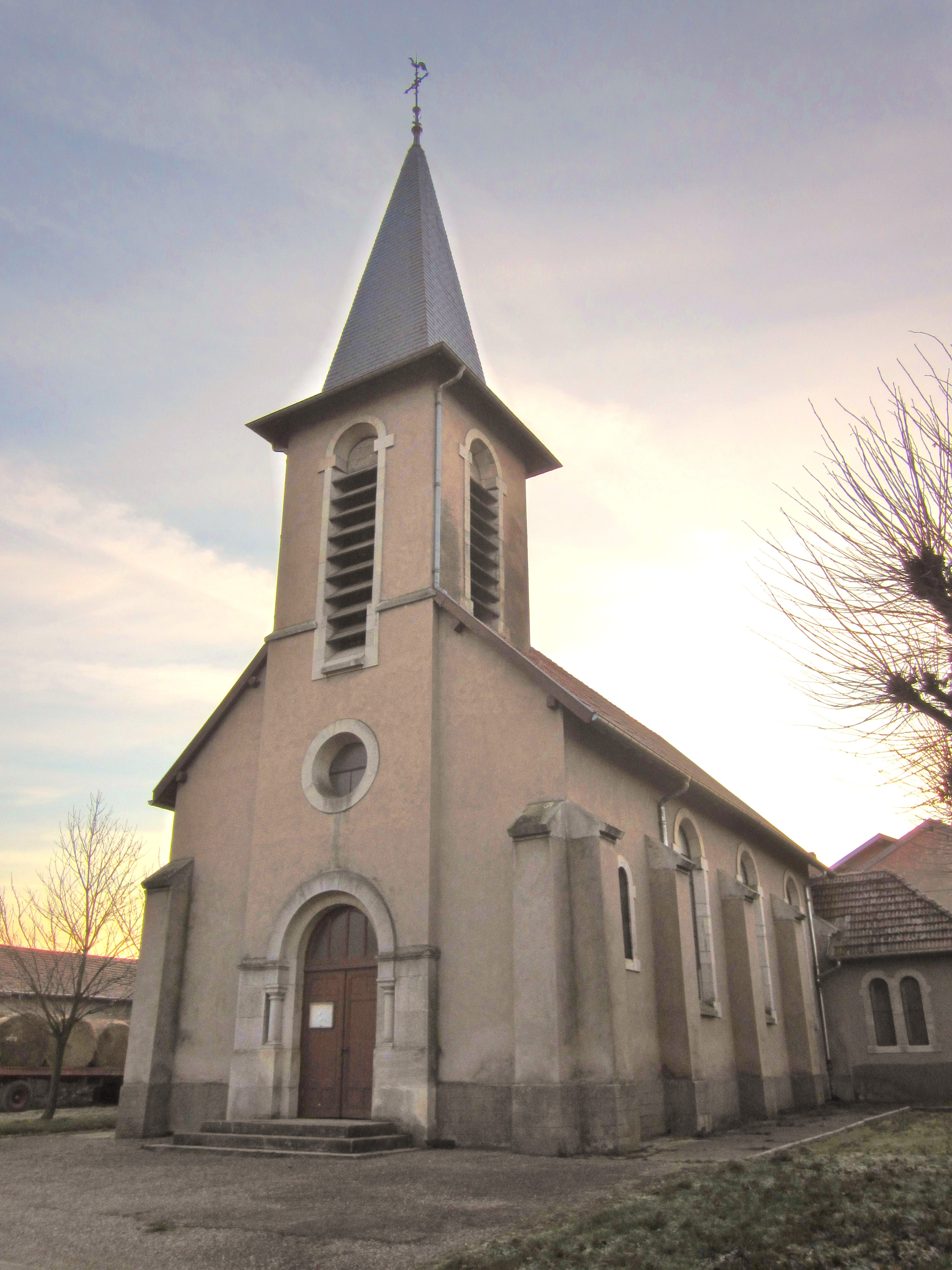
- The church in Rouves

- Coat of arms
- Location of Rouves
- Location within France Location within Grand Est
- Coordinates: 48°53′59″N 6°12′23″E
- Country: France
- Region: Grand Est
- Department: Meurthe-et-Moselle
- Arrondissement: Nancy
- Canton: Entre Seille et Meurthe
- Intercommunality: Seille et Grand Couronné

Government
  - Mayor (2020–2026): Magali Rojas
- Area^{1}: 3.69 km^{2} (1.42 sq mi)
- Elevation: 185 m (607 ft)
- Highest elevation: 216 m (709 ft)
- Lowest elevation: 180 m (590 ft)
- Population (2023): 100
  - Density: 27/km^{2} (70/sq mi)
- Time zone: UTC+01:00 (CET)
  - Summer (DST): UTC+02:00 (CEST)
- INSEE/Postal code: 54464 /54610
- ^{1} French Land Register data, which excludes lakes, ponds, glaciers > 1 km^{2} (0.386 sq mi or 247 acres) and river estuaries.

Rouves (French pronunciation: [ʁuv]) is a commune in the Meurthe-et-Moselle department in north-eastern France.

== See also ==
- Communes of the Meurthe-et-Moselle department
