= Arraye-et-Han =

- Commune
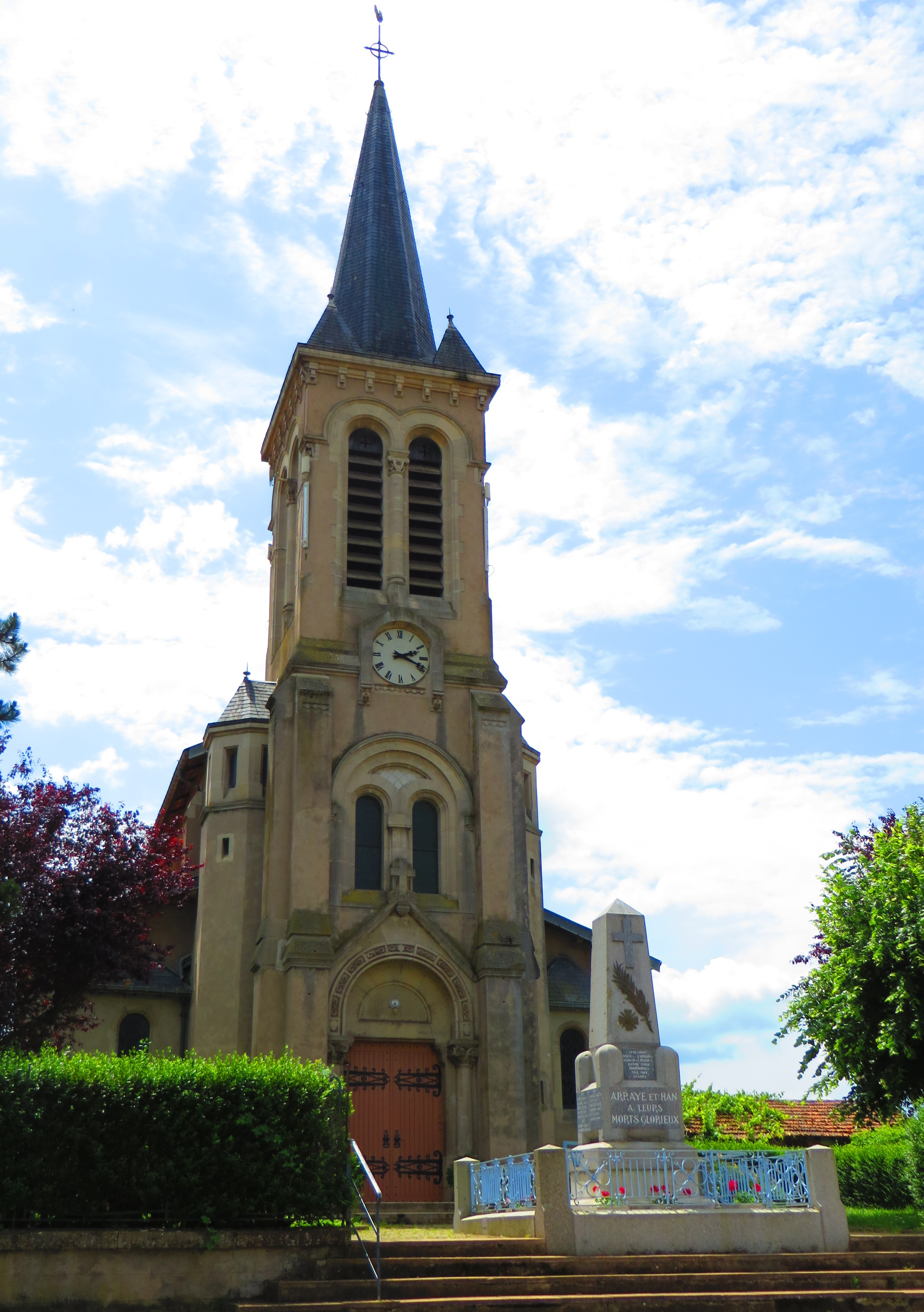
- The church in Arraye

- Coat of arms
- Location of Arraye-et-Han
- Location within France Location within Grand Est
- Coordinates: 48°50′28″N 6°17′31″E
- Country: France
- Region: Grand Est
- Department: Meurthe-et-Moselle
- Arrondissement: Nancy
- Canton: Entre Seille et Meurthe
- Intercommunality: Seille et Grand Couronné

Government
  - Mayor (2020–2026): Denis Ory
- Area^{1}: 10.34 km^{2} (3.99 sq mi)
- Elevation: 191 m (627 ft)
- Highest elevation: 228 m (748 ft)
- Lowest elevation: 189 m (620 ft)
- Population (2023): 370
  - Density: 36/km^{2} (93/sq mi)
- Time zone: UTC+01:00 (CET)
  - Summer (DST): UTC+02:00 (CEST)
- INSEE/Postal code: 54024 /54760
- ^{1} French Land Register data, which excludes lakes, ponds, glaciers > 1 km^{2} (0.386 sq mi or 247 acres) and river estuaries.

Arraye-et-Han is a commune in the Meurthe-et-Moselle department in northeastern France.

It lies 27 km (17 mi) north of Nancy and 40 km (25 mi) south of Metz. The river Seille runs along the western side of the commune.

== Population ==
Historical population
Year	Pop.	±% p.a.
1968	276	—
1975	253	−1.24%
1982	240	−0.75%
1990	319	+3.62%
1999	332	+0.44%
2007	333	+0.04%
2012	336	+0.18%
2017	359	+1.33%
2023	370	+0.50%
Source: INSEE

== See also ==
- Communes of the Meurthe-et-Moselle department
