= Mailly-sur-Seille =

- Commune
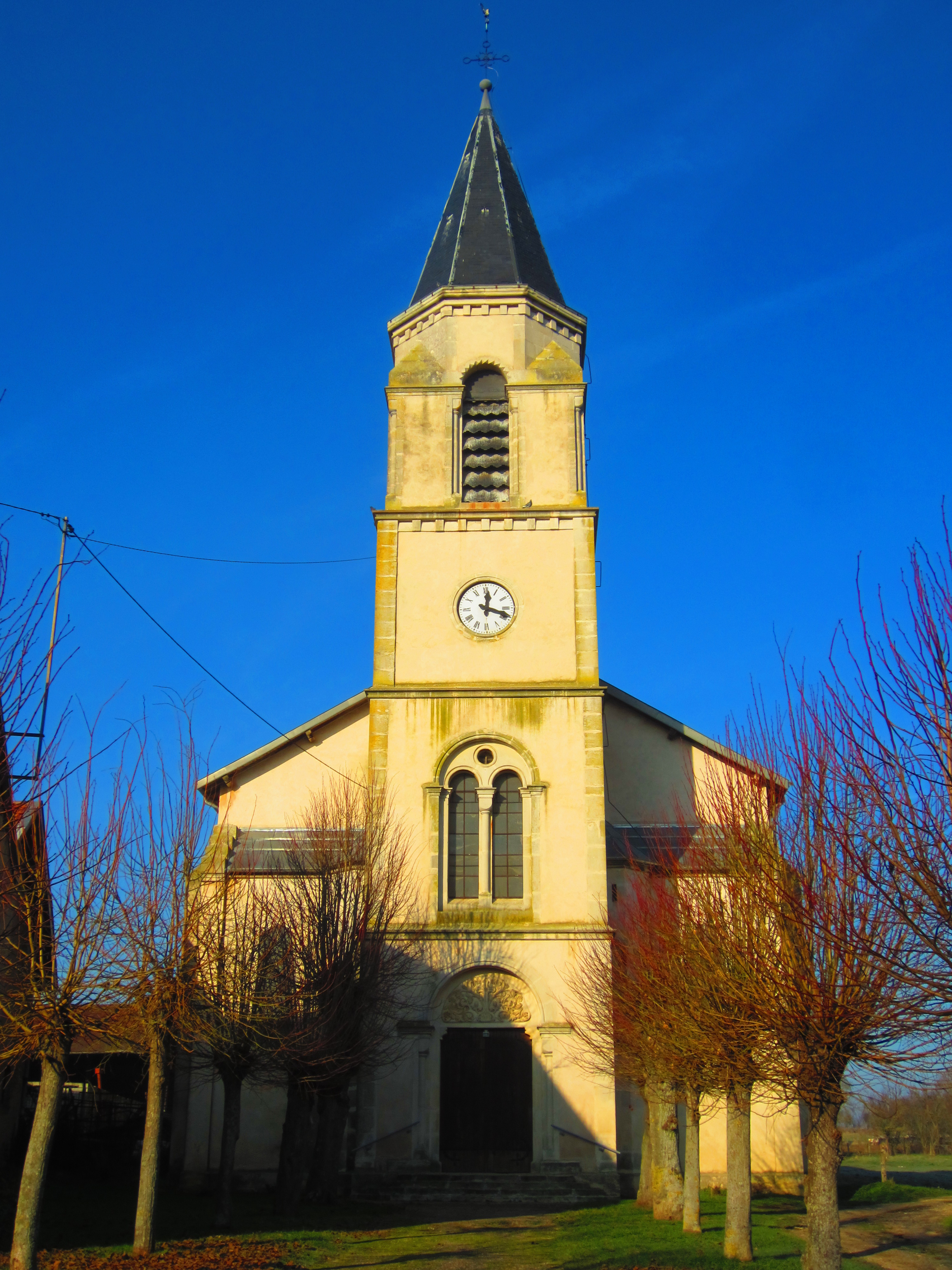
- The church in Mailly-sur-Seille

- Coat of arms
- Location of Mailly-sur-Seille
- Location within France Location within Grand Est
- Coordinates: 48°54′41″N 6°14′45″E
- Country: France
- Region: Grand Est
- Department: Meurthe-et-Moselle
- Arrondissement: Nancy
- Canton: Entre Seille et Meurthe
- Intercommunality: Seille et Grand Couronné

Government
  - Mayor (2020–2026): Philippe Bernard
- Area^{1}: 6.4 km^{2} (2.5 sq mi)
- Elevation: 187 m (614 ft)
- Highest elevation: 283 m (928 ft)
- Lowest elevation: 184 m (604 ft)
- Population (2023): 245
  - Density: 38/km^{2} (99/sq mi)
- Time zone: UTC+01:00 (CET)
  - Summer (DST): UTC+02:00 (CEST)
- INSEE/Postal code: 54333 /54610
- ^{1} French Land Register data, which excludes lakes, ponds, glaciers > 1 km^{2} (0.386 sq mi or 247 acres) and river estuaries.

Mailly-sur-Seille (French pronunciation: [maji syʁ sɛj], literally Mailly on Seille) is a commune in the Meurthe-et-Moselle department in north-eastern France.

== See also ==
- Communes of the Meurthe-et-Moselle department
