= Clémery =

- Commune
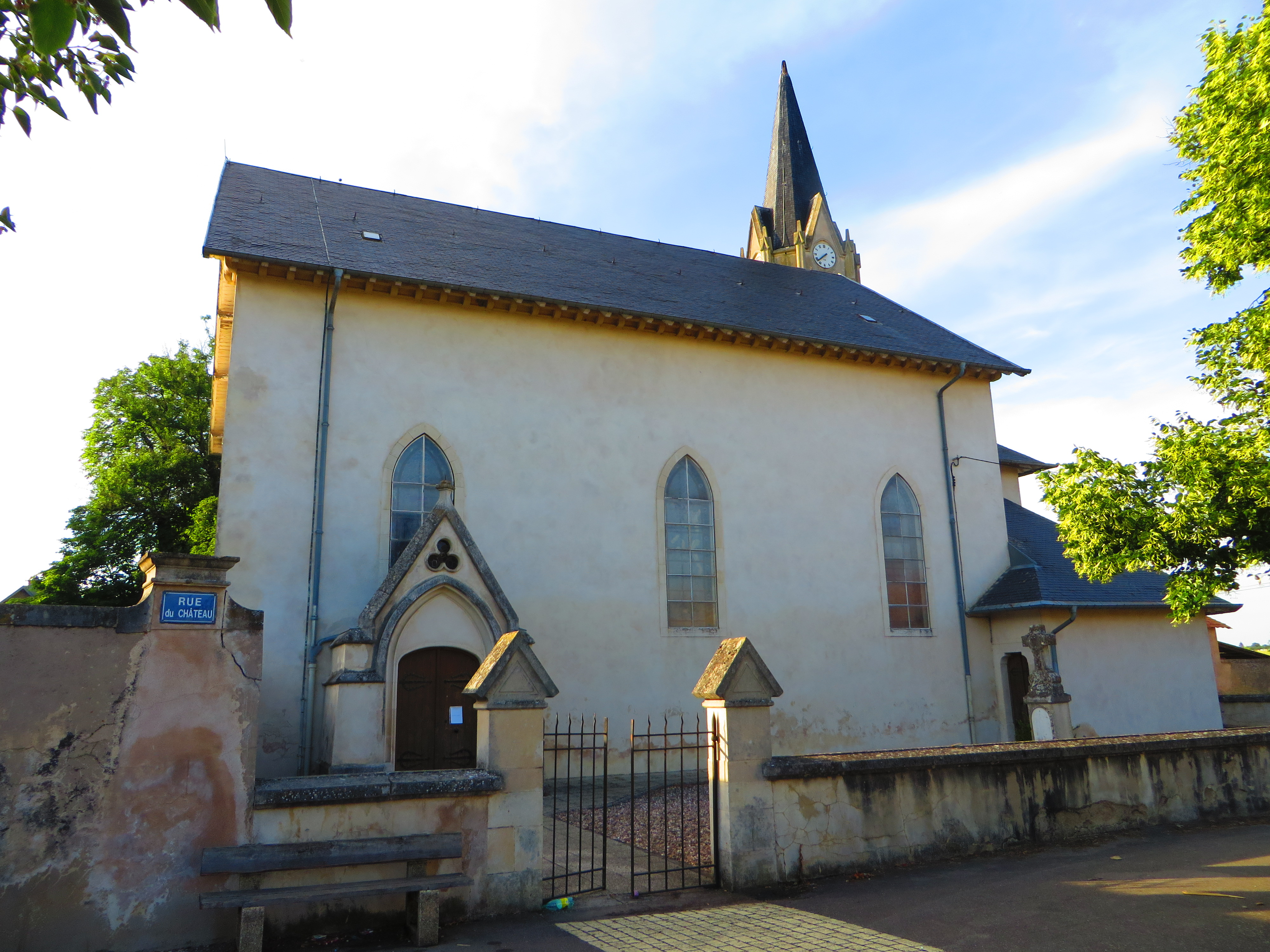
- The church in Clémery

- Coat of arms
- Location of Clémery
- Location within France Location within Grand Est
- Coordinates: 48°53′41″N 6°11′11″E
- Country: France
- Region: Grand Est
- Department: Meurthe-et-Moselle
- Arrondissement: Nancy
- Canton: Entre Seille et Meurthe
- Intercommunality: Seille et Grand Couronné

Government
  - Mayor (2022–2026): Lina Rustom
- Area^{1}: 9.45 km^{2} (3.65 sq mi)
- Elevation: 180 m (590 ft)
- Highest elevation: 226 m (741 ft)
- Lowest elevation: 179 m (587 ft)
- Population (2023): 491
  - Density: 52.0/km^{2} (135/sq mi)
- Time zone: UTC+01:00 (CET)
  - Summer (DST): UTC+02:00 (CEST)
- INSEE/Postal code: 54131 /54610
- ^{1} French Land Register data, which excludes lakes, ponds, glaciers > 1 km^{2} (0.386 sq mi or 247 acres) and river estuaries.

Clémery is a commune in the Meurthe-et-Moselle department in north-eastern France.

== See also ==
- Communes of the Meurthe-et-Moselle department
