= Raucourt =

- Commune
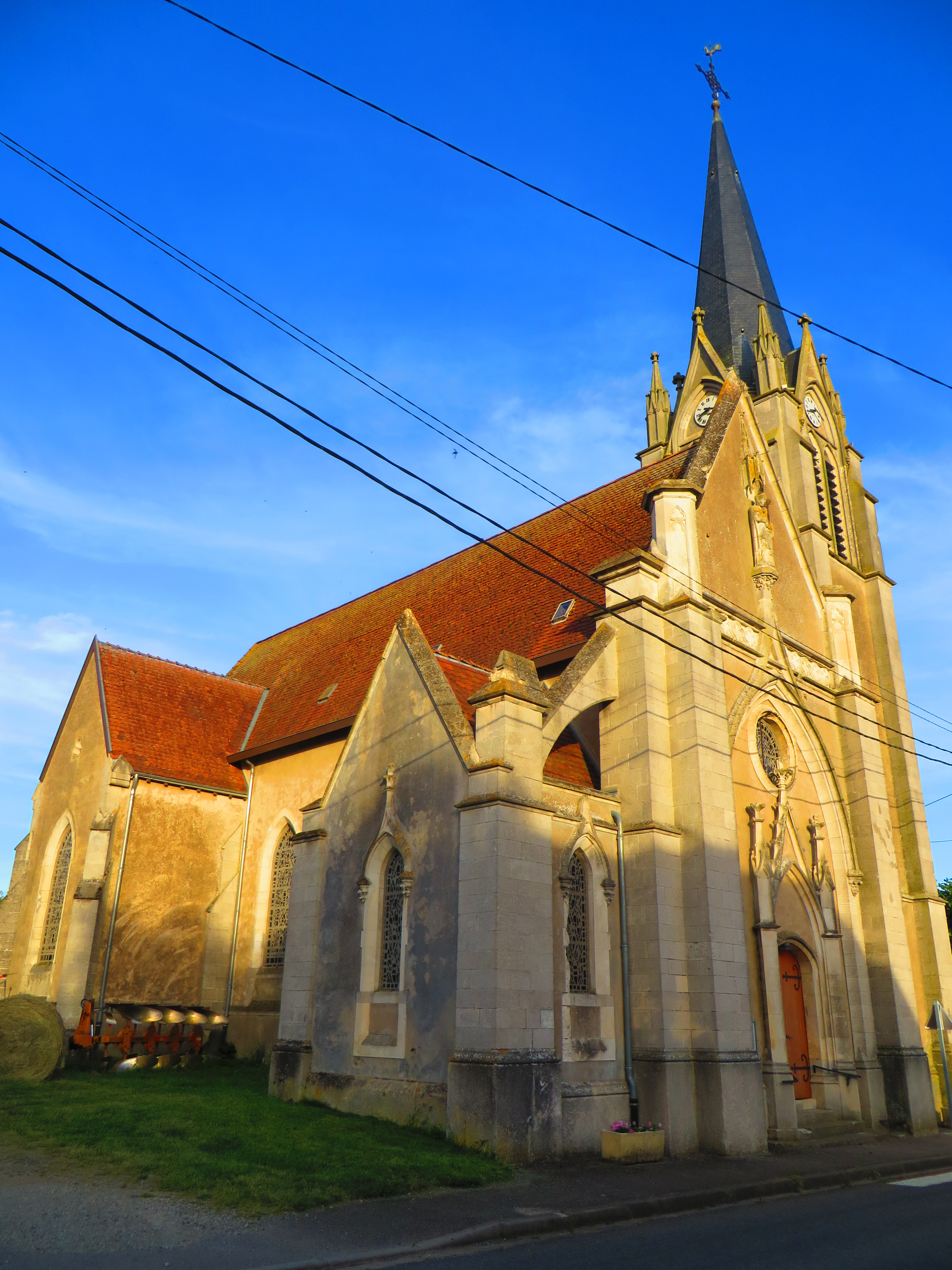
- The church in Raucourt

- Coat of arms
- Location of Raucourt
- Location within France Location within Grand Est
- Coordinates: 48°55′42″N 6°13′08″E
- Country: France
- Region: Grand Est
- Department: Meurthe-et-Moselle
- Arrondissement: Nancy
- Canton: Entre Seille et Meurthe
- Intercommunality: Seille et Grand Couronné

Government
  - Mayor (2020–2026): Claude Bastien
- Area^{1}: 5.06 km^{2} (1.95 sq mi)
- Elevation: 249 m (817 ft)
- Highest elevation: 251 m (823 ft)
- Lowest elevation: 199 m (653 ft)
- Population (2023): 235
  - Density: 46.4/km^{2} (120/sq mi)
- Time zone: UTC+01:00 (CET)
  - Summer (DST): UTC+02:00 (CEST)
- INSEE/Postal code: 54444 /54610
- ^{1} French Land Register data, which excludes lakes, ponds, glaciers > 1 km^{2} (0.386 sq mi or 247 acres) and river estuaries.

Raucourt (French pronunciation: [ʁokuʁ]) is a commune in the Meurthe-et-Moselle department in north-eastern France.

== See also ==
- Communes of the Meurthe-et-Moselle department
