= Leyr =

- Commune
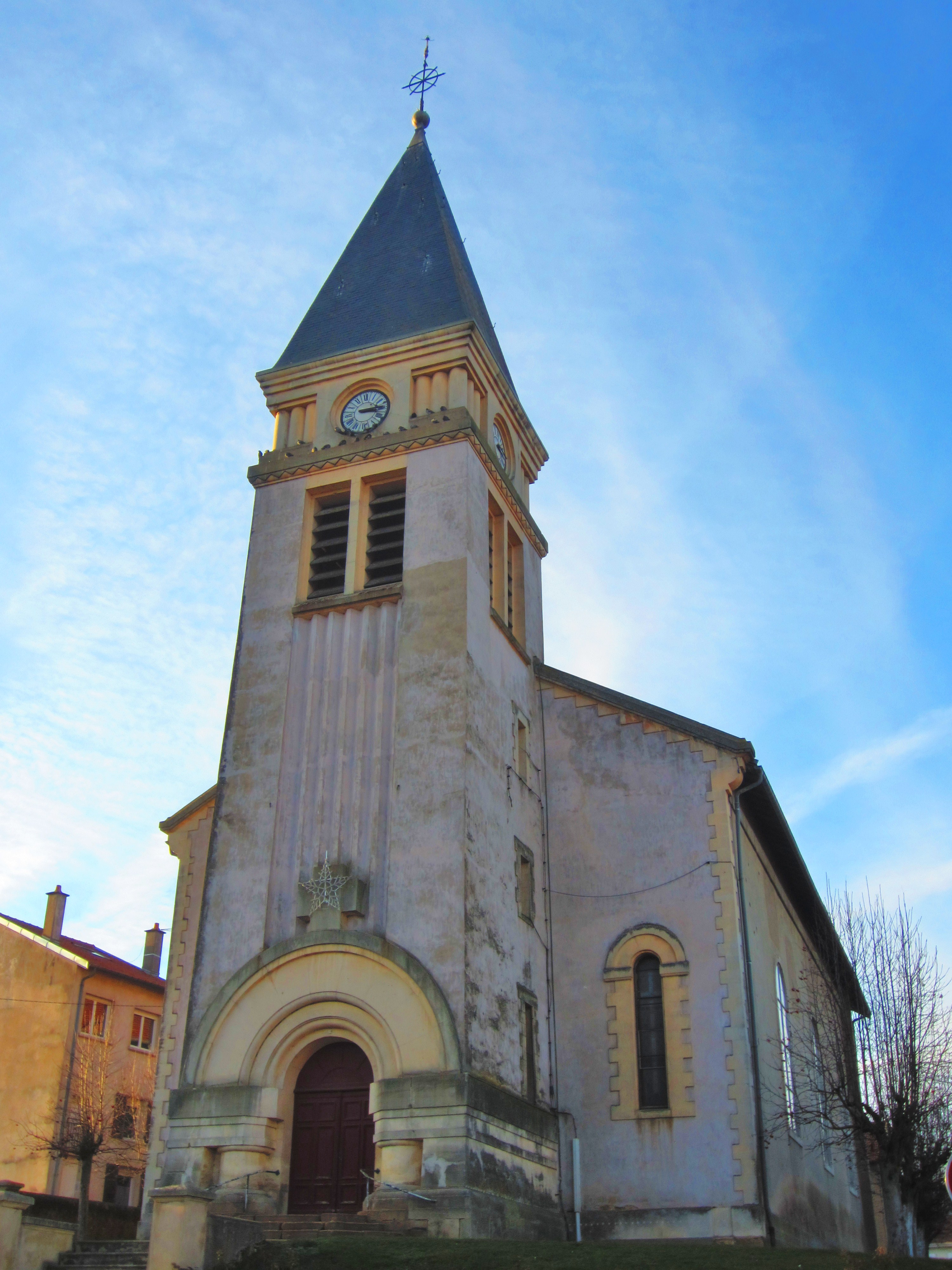
- The church in Leyr

- Coat of arms
- Location of Leyr
- Location within France Location within Grand Est
- Coordinates: 48°48′14″N 6°15′57″E
- Country: France
- Region: Grand Est
- Department: Meurthe-et-Moselle
- Arrondissement: Nancy
- Canton: Entre Seille et Meurthe
- Intercommunality: Seille et Grand Couronné

Government
  - Mayor (2020–2026): Jean-Marc Iemetti
- Area^{1}: 10.74 km^{2} (4.15 sq mi)
- Elevation: 230 m (750 ft)
- Highest elevation: 415 m (1,362 ft)
- Lowest elevation: 199 m (653 ft)
- Population (2023): 906
  - Density: 84.4/km^{2} (218/sq mi)
- Time zone: UTC+01:00 (CET)
  - Summer (DST): UTC+02:00 (CEST)
- INSEE/Postal code: 54315 /54760
- ^{1} French Land Register data, which excludes lakes, ponds, glaciers > 1 km^{2} (0.386 sq mi or 247 acres) and river estuaries.

Leyr (French pronunciation: [lɛʁ]) is a commune in the Meurthe-et-Moselle department in north-eastern France.

== See also ==
- Communes of the Meurthe-et-Moselle department
