= Canton of Entre Seille et Meurthe =

Canton in Grand Est, France

Coordinates: 48.84°N 6.07°E

The canton of Entre Seille et Meurthe is an administrative division of the Meurthe-et-Moselle department, northeastern France. It was created at the French canton reorganisation which came into effect in March 2015. Its seat is in Dieulouard.

It consists of the following communes:

1. Abaucourt
2. Armaucourt
3. Arraye-et-Han
4. Autreville-sur-Moselle
5. Belleau
6. Belleville
7. Bey-sur-Seille
8. Bezaumont
9. Bouxières-aux-Dames
10. Bratte
11. Brin-sur-Seille
12. Chenicourt
13. Clémery
14. Custines
15. Dieulouard
16. Éply
17. Faulx
18. Jeandelaincourt
19. Landremont
20. Lanfroicourt
21. Lay-Saint-Christophe
22. Létricourt
23. Leyr
24. Mailly-sur-Seille
25. Malleloy
26. Millery
27. Moivrons
28. Montenoy
29. Morville-sur-Seille
30. Nomeny
31. Phlin
32. Port-sur-Seille
33. Raucourt
34. Rouves
35. Sainte-Geneviève
36. Sivry
37. Thézey-Saint-Martin
38. Ville-au-Val
39. Villers-lès-Moivrons
