= Bratte =

- Commune
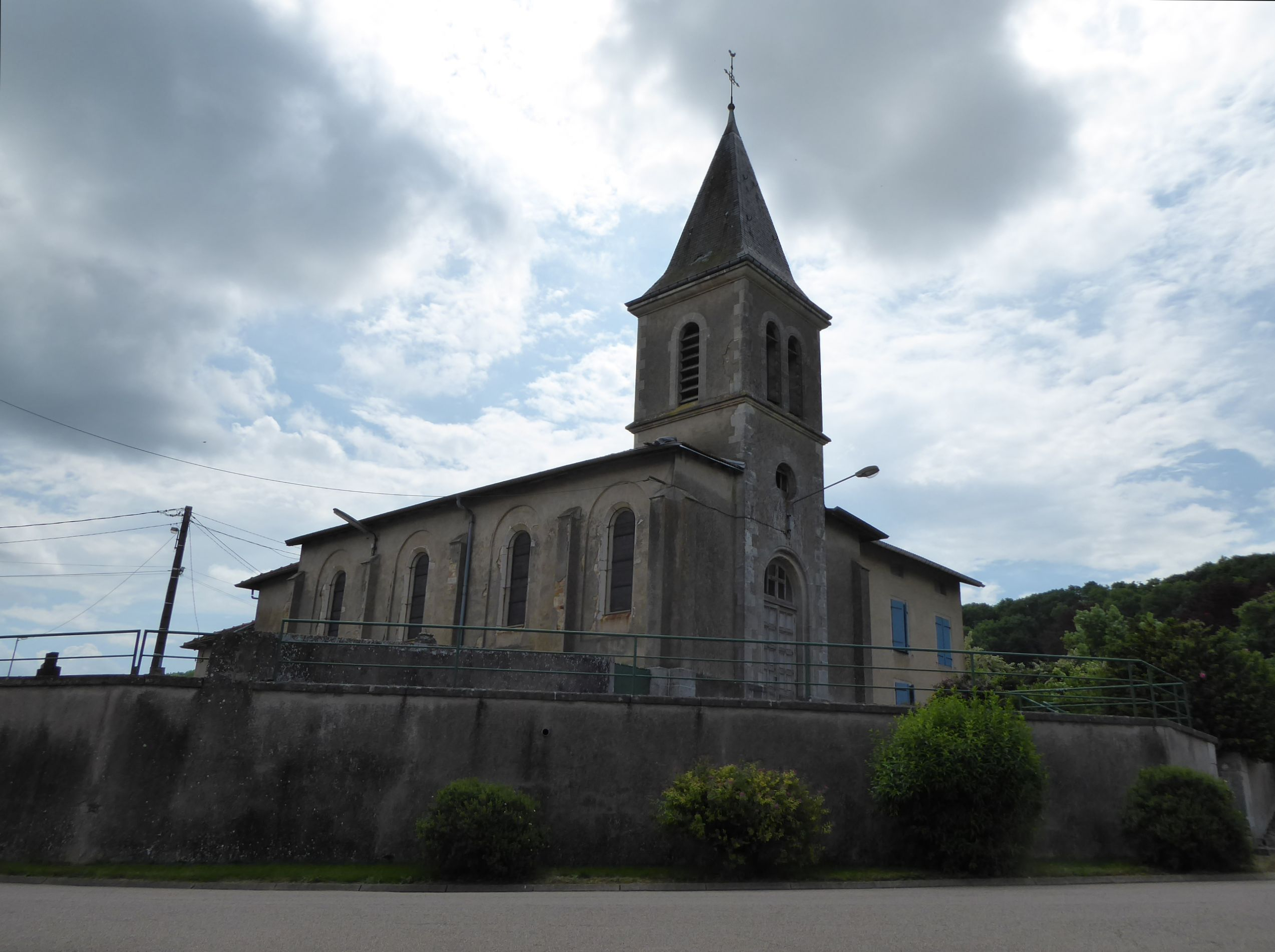
- The church in Bratte

- Coat of arms
- Location of Bratte
- Location within France Location within Grand Est
- Coordinates: 48°48′52″N 6°12′59″E
- Country: France
- Region: Grand Est
- Department: Meurthe-et-Moselle
- Arrondissement: Nancy
- Canton: Entre Seille et Meurthe

Government
  - Mayor (2020–2026): Carole Marande
- Area^{1}: 3.28 km^{2} (1.27 sq mi)
- Elevation: 330 m (1,080 ft)
- Highest elevation: 405 m (1,329 ft)
- Lowest elevation: 260 m (850 ft)
- Population (2023): 46
  - Density: 14/km^{2} (36/sq mi)
- Time zone: UTC+01:00 (CET)
  - Summer (DST): UTC+02:00 (CEST)
- INSEE/Postal code: 54095 /54610
- ^{1} French Land Register data, which excludes lakes, ponds, glaciers > 1 km^{2} (0.386 sq mi or 247 acres) and river estuaries.

Bratte (French pronunciation: [bʁat]) is a commune in the Meurthe-et-Moselle department in northeastern France.

== Population ==
Historical population
Year	Pop.	±% p.a.
1968	17	—
1975	16	−0.86%
1982	30	+9.40%
1990	42	+4.30%
1999	42	+0.00%
2007	32	−3.34%
2012	40	+4.56%
2017	44	+1.92%
2023	46	+0.74%
Source: INSEE

== See also ==
- Communes of the Meurthe-et-Moselle department
