= Chenicourt =

- Commune
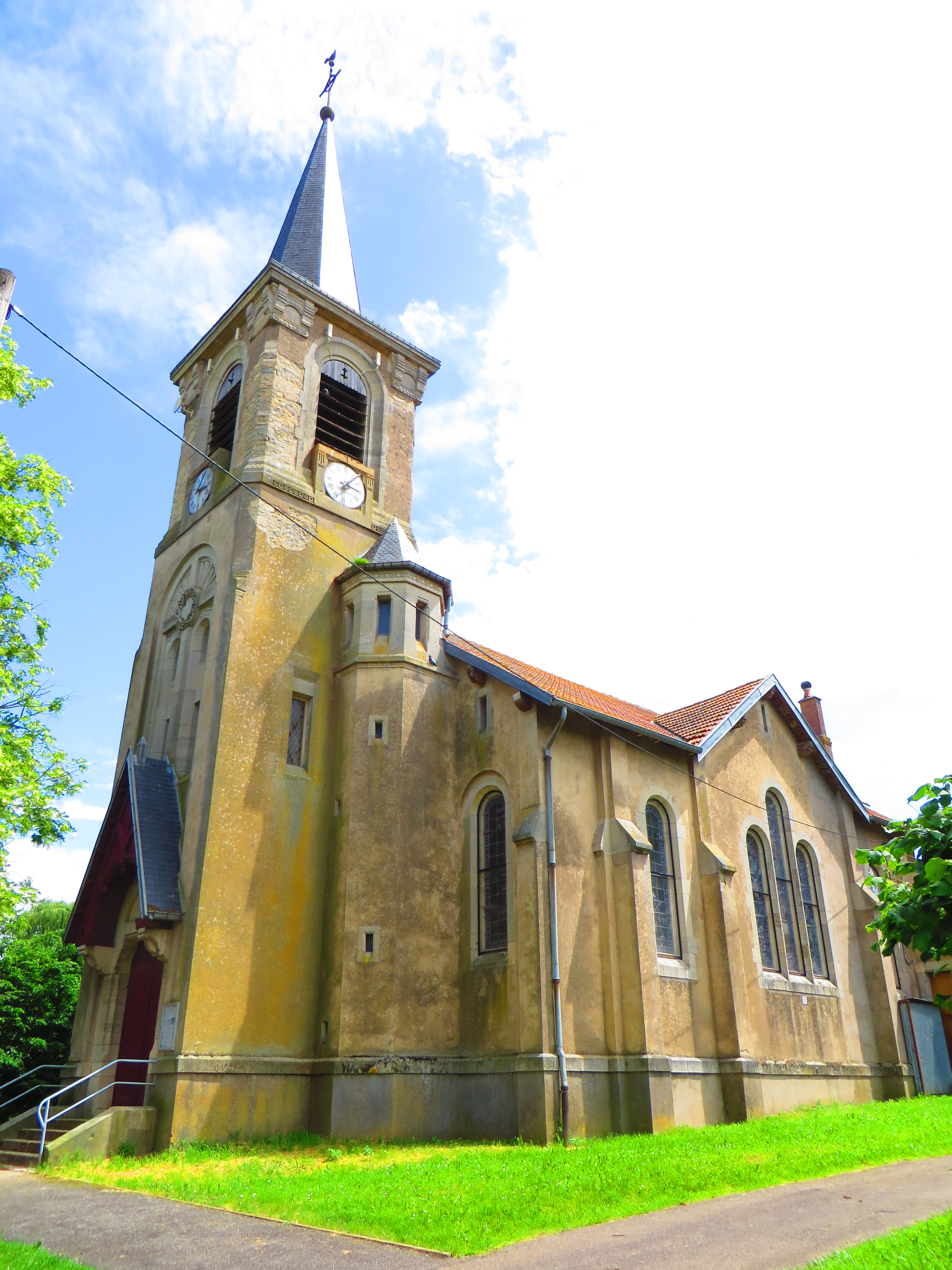
- The church in Chenicourt

- Coat of arms
- Location of Chenicourt
- Location within France Location within Grand Est
- Coordinates: 48°51′28″N 6°17′27″E
- Country: France
- Region: Grand Est
- Department: Meurthe-et-Moselle
- Arrondissement: Nancy
- Canton: Entre Seille et Meurthe
- Intercommunality: Seille et Grand Couronné

Government
  - Mayor (2020–2026): Chantal Chery
- Area^{1}: 3.75 km^{2} (1.45 sq mi)
- Elevation: 191 m (627 ft)
- Highest elevation: 230 m (750 ft)
- Lowest elevation: 187 m (614 ft)
- Population (2023): 209
  - Density: 55.7/km^{2} (144/sq mi)
- Time zone: UTC+01:00 (CET)
  - Summer (DST): UTC+02:00 (CEST)
- INSEE/Postal code: 54126 /54610
- ^{1} French Land Register data, which excludes lakes, ponds, glaciers > 1 km^{2} (0.386 sq mi or 247 acres) and river estuaries.

Chenicourt (French pronunciation: [ʃənikuʁ]) is a commune in the Meurthe-et-Moselle department in north-eastern France.

== Population ==
Historical population
Year	Pop.	±% p.a.
1968	152	—
1975	158	+0.55%
1982	133	−2.43%
1990	180	+3.86%
1999	191	+0.66%
2007	220	+1.78%
2012	229	+0.81%
2017	227	−0.18%
2023	209	−1.37%
Source: INSEE

== See also ==
- Communes of the Meurthe-et-Moselle department
