= Villers-lès-Moivrons =

- Commune
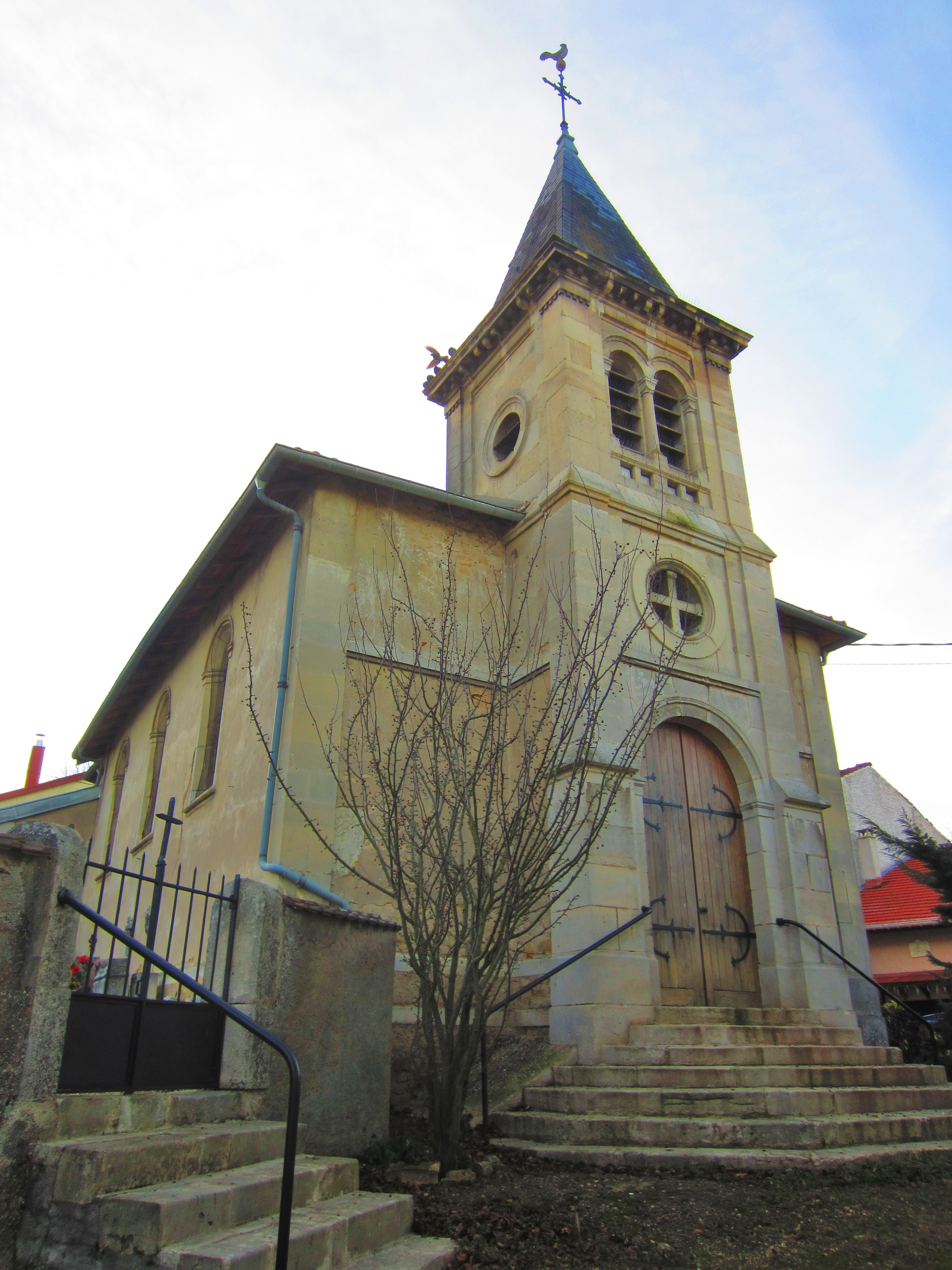
- The church in Villers-lès-Moivrons

- Coat of arms
- Location of Villers-lès-Moivrons
- Location within France Location within Grand Est
- Coordinates: 48°48′54″N 6°15′08″E
- Country: France
- Region: Grand Est
- Department: Meurthe-et-Moselle
- Arrondissement: Nancy
- Canton: Entre Seille et Meurthe

Government
  - Mayor (2023–2026): Didier Louis
- Area^{1}: 2.85 km^{2} (1.10 sq mi)
- Elevation: 250 m (820 ft)
- Highest elevation: 420 m (1,380 ft)
- Lowest elevation: 208 m (682 ft)
- Population (2023): 144
  - Density: 50.5/km^{2} (131/sq mi)
- Time zone: UTC+01:00 (CET)
  - Summer (DST): UTC+02:00 (CEST)
- INSEE/Postal code: 54577 /54760
- ^{1} French Land Register data, which excludes lakes, ponds, glaciers > 1 km^{2} (0.386 sq mi or 247 acres) and river estuaries.

Villers-lès-Moivrons is a commune in the Meurthe-et-Moselle department in north-eastern France.

== See also ==
- Communes of the Meurthe-et-Moselle department
