= Létricourt =

- Commune
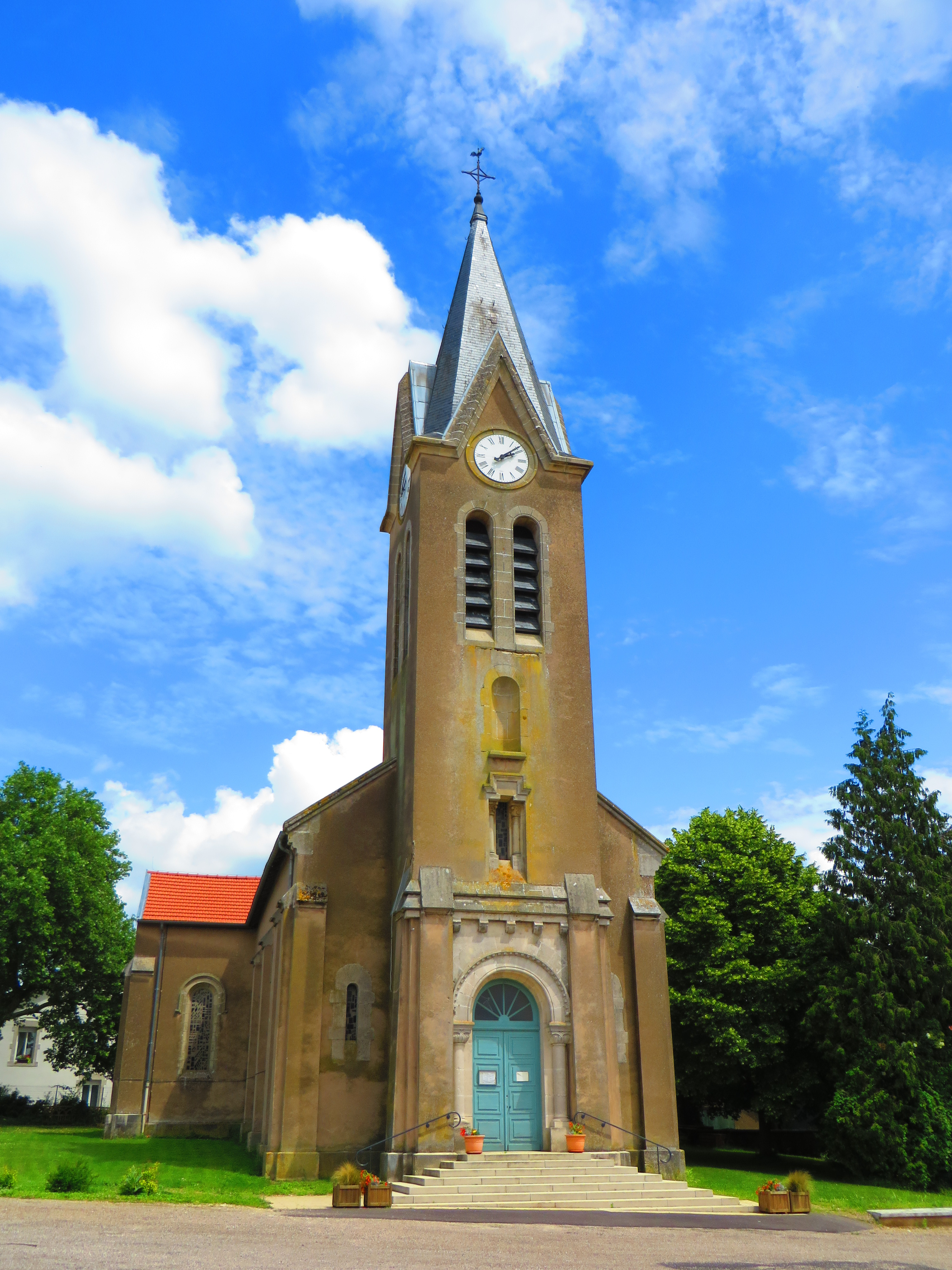
- The church in Létricourt

- Coat of arms
- Location of Létricourt
- Location within France Location within Grand Est
- Coordinates: 48°52′35″N 6°17′45″E
- Country: France
- Region: Grand Est
- Department: Meurthe-et-Moselle
- Arrondissement: Nancy
- Canton: Entre Seille et Meurthe
- Intercommunality: Seille et Grand Couronné

Government
  - Mayor (2020–2026): Vincent Francois
- Area^{1}: 7.38 km^{2} (2.85 sq mi)
- Elevation: 210 m (690 ft)
- Highest elevation: 238 m (781 ft)
- Lowest elevation: 187 m (614 ft)
- Population (2023): 224
  - Density: 30.4/km^{2} (78.6/sq mi)
- Time zone: UTC+01:00 (CET)
  - Summer (DST): UTC+02:00 (CEST)
- INSEE/Postal code: 54313 /54610
- ^{1} French Land Register data, which excludes lakes, ponds, glaciers > 1 km^{2} (0.386 sq mi or 247 acres) and river estuaries.

Létricourt (French pronunciation: [letʁikuʁ]) is a commune in the Meurthe-et-Moselle department in north-eastern France.

== See also ==
- Communes of the Meurthe-et-Moselle department
