= Montenoy =

- Commune
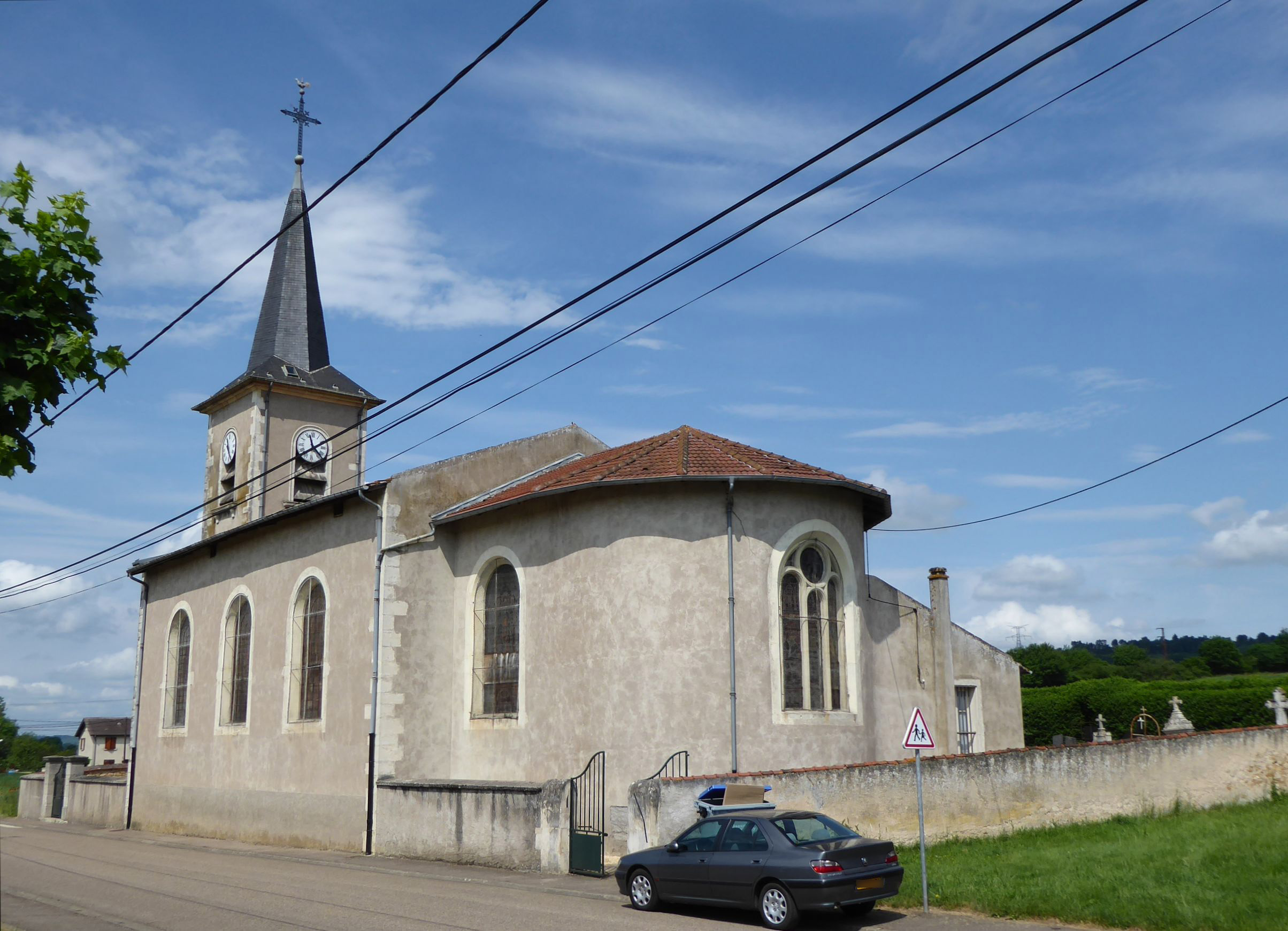
- The church in Montenoy

- Coat of arms
- Location of Montenoy
- Location within France Location within Grand Est
- Coordinates: 48°47′46″N 6°13′53″E
- Country: France
- Region: Grand Est
- Department: Meurthe-et-Moselle
- Arrondissement: Nancy
- Canton: Entre Seille et Meurthe
- Intercommunality: CC Bassin de Pompey

Government
  - Mayor (2020–2026): Sébastien Point
- Area^{1}: 3.98 km^{2} (1.54 sq mi)
- Elevation: 271 m (889 ft)
- Highest elevation: 417 m (1,368 ft)
- Lowest elevation: 252 m (827 ft)
- Population (2023): 397
  - Density: 99.7/km^{2} (258/sq mi)
- Time zone: UTC+01:00 (CET)
  - Summer (DST): UTC+02:00 (CEST)
- INSEE/Postal code: 54376 /54760
- ^{1} French Land Register data, which excludes lakes, ponds, glaciers > 1 km^{2} (0.386 sq mi or 247 acres) and river estuaries.

Montenoy (French pronunciation: [mɔ̃tnwa]) is a commune in the Meurthe-et-Moselle department in north-eastern France.

== See also ==
- Communes of the Meurthe-et-Moselle department
