= Jeandelaincourt =

- Commune
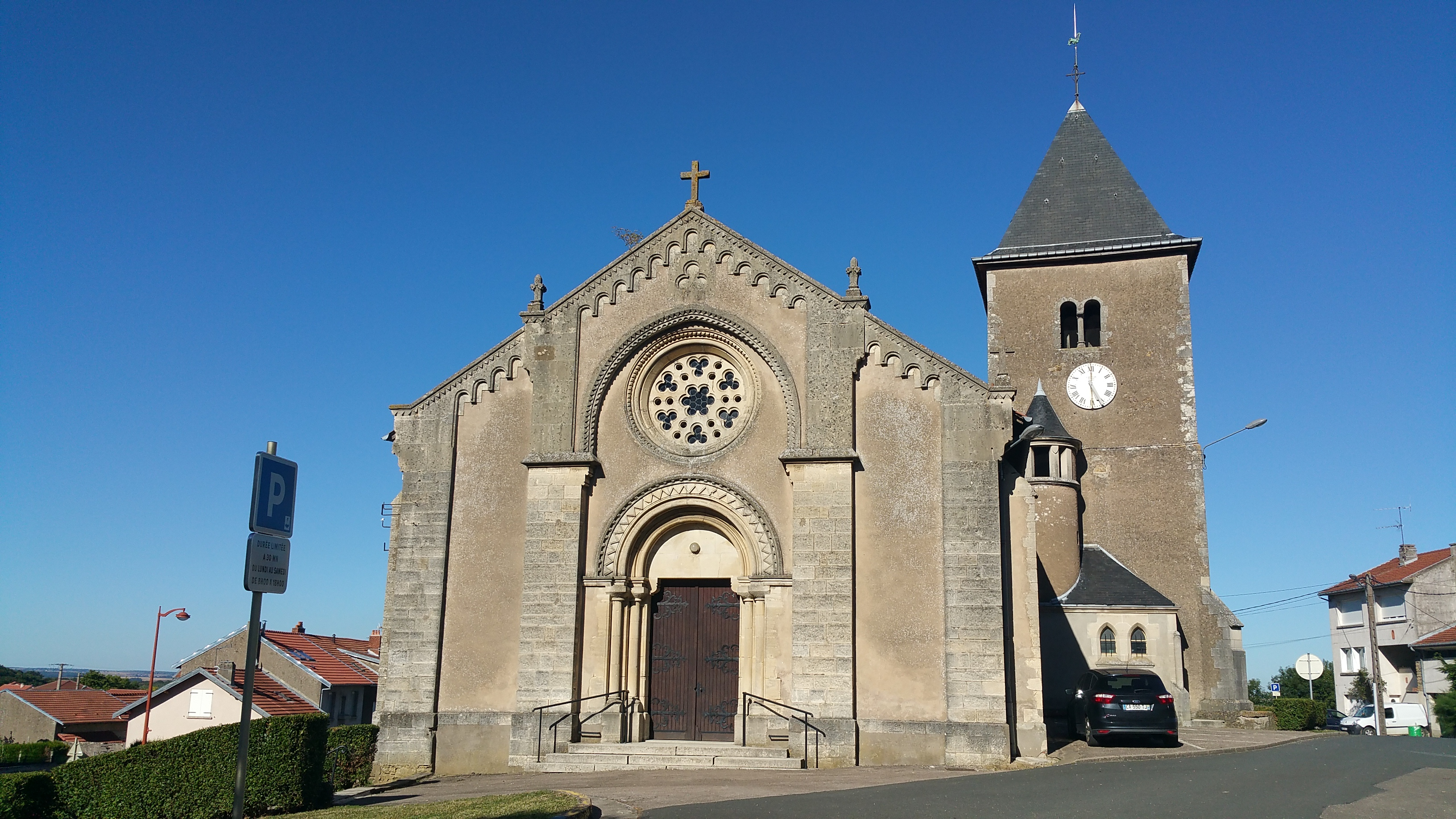
- The church in Jeandelaincourt

- Coat of arms
- Location of Jeandelaincourt
- Location within France Location within Grand Est
- Coordinates: 48°50′38″N 6°14′34″E
- Country: France
- Region: Grand Est
- Department: Meurthe-et-Moselle
- Arrondissement: Nancy
- Canton: Entre Seille et Meurthe
- Intercommunality: Seille et Grand Couronné

Government
  - Mayor (2020–2026): Philippe Joly
- Area^{1}: 4.47 km^{2} (1.73 sq mi)
- Highest elevation: 298 m (978 ft)
- Lowest elevation: 192 m (630 ft)
- Population (2023): 785
  - Density: 176/km^{2} (455/sq mi)
- Time zone: UTC+01:00 (CET)
  - Summer (DST): UTC+02:00 (CEST)
- INSEE/Postal code: 54276 /54114
- ^{1} French Land Register data, which excludes lakes, ponds, glaciers > 1 km^{2} (0.386 sq mi or 247 acres) and river estuaries.

Jeandelaincourt (French pronunciation: [ʒɑ̃dlɛ̃kuʁ]) is a commune in the Meurthe-et-Moselle department in north-eastern France.

== Geography ==
- The village is situated at the foot of Mont Saint Jean (407m), 32 km North-east of Nancy.
- A natural path of discovery and a dashing pond located on the village.

== History ==
- First tracks in 1090 under the name "Godelincourt", the village has a succession of several lords before finally Jeandelaincourt name in reference to the last lord named Jean.
- Before installing the slate factory in 1893 the village was rural.
- Damage during the war 1914-1918
- Heavily damaged by the fighting in September 1944.

== Demography ==
Historical population
| Year | Pop. | ±% p.a. |
|---|---|---|
| 1968 | 874 | — |
| 1975 | 768 | −1.83% |
| 1982 | 717 | −0.98% |
| 1990 | 668 | −0.88% |
| 1999 | 665 | −0.05% |
| 2007 | 737 | +1.29% |
| 2012 | 803 | +1.73% |
| 2017 | 811 | +0.20% |
| 2023 | 785 | −0.54% |
Source: INSEE

== Monuments and sites ==
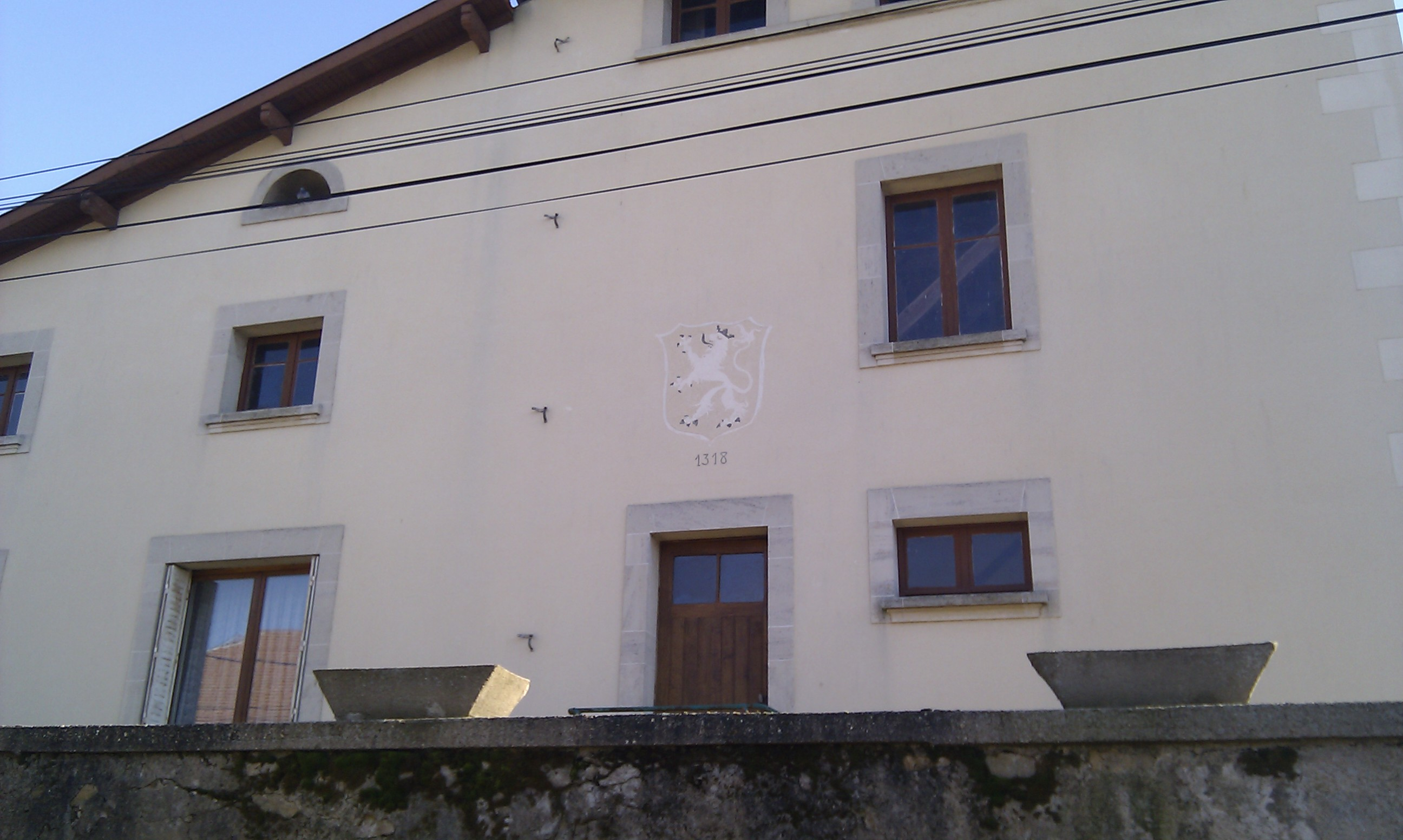
IMAG0294

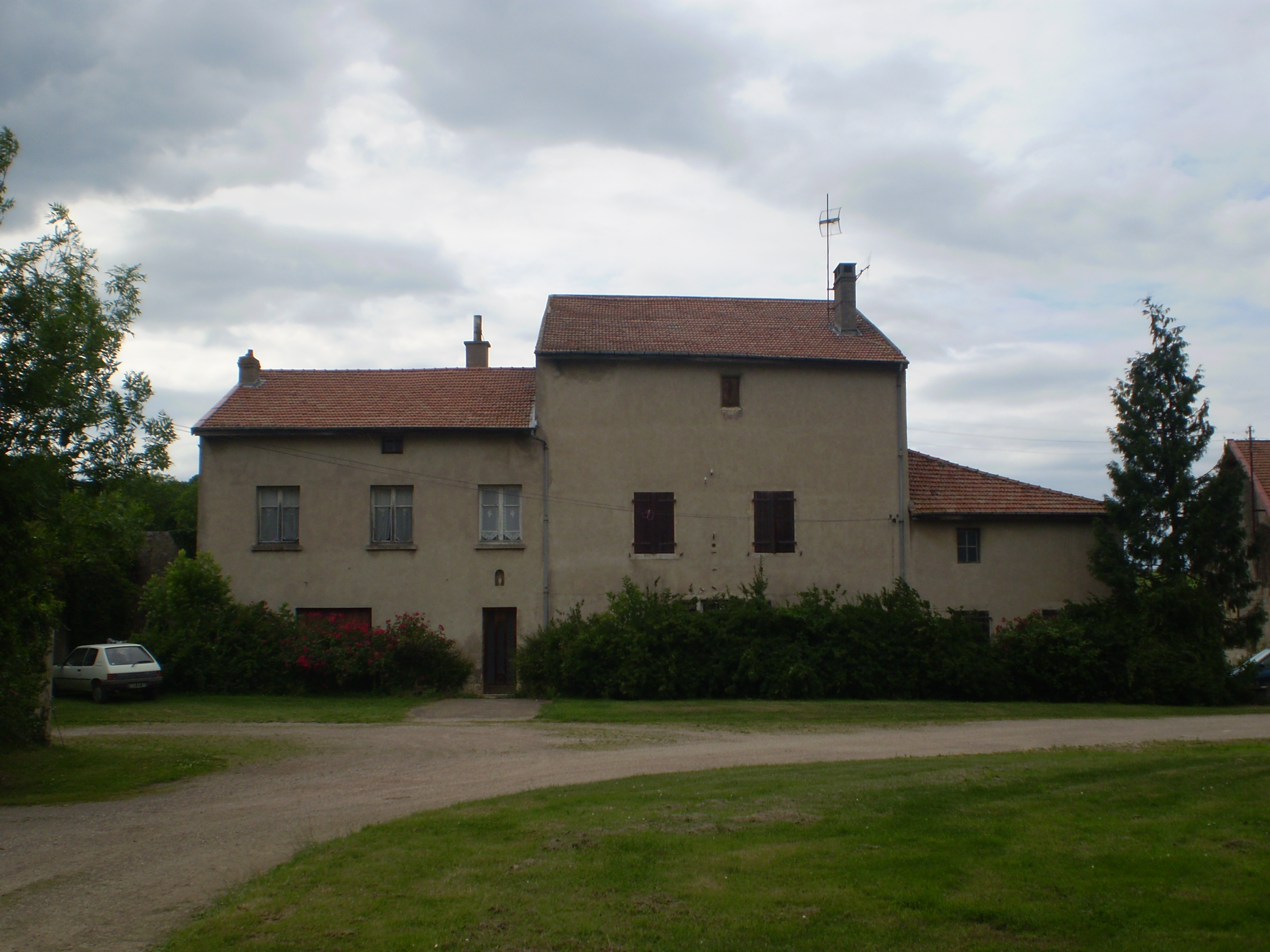
P6230414

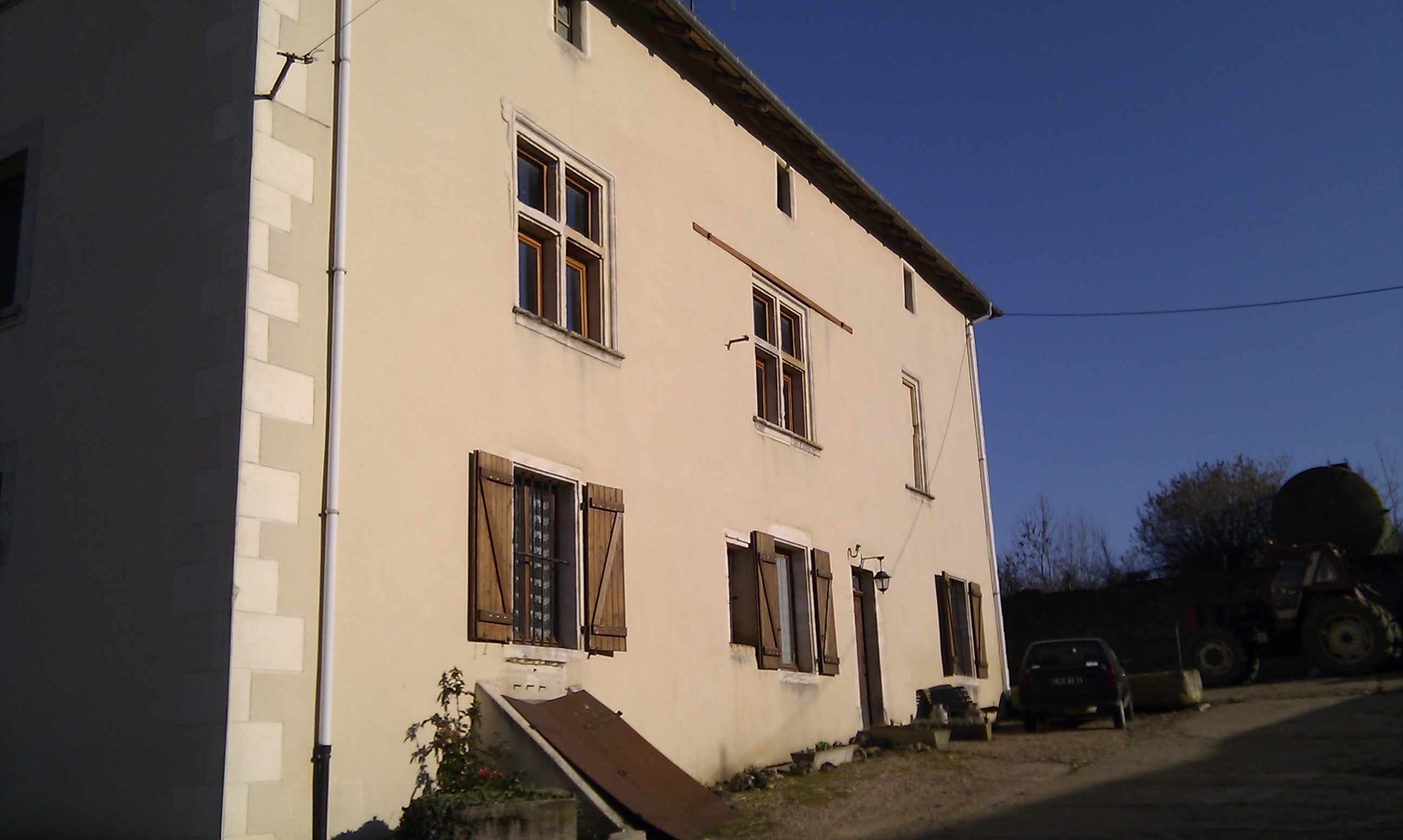
IMAG0295

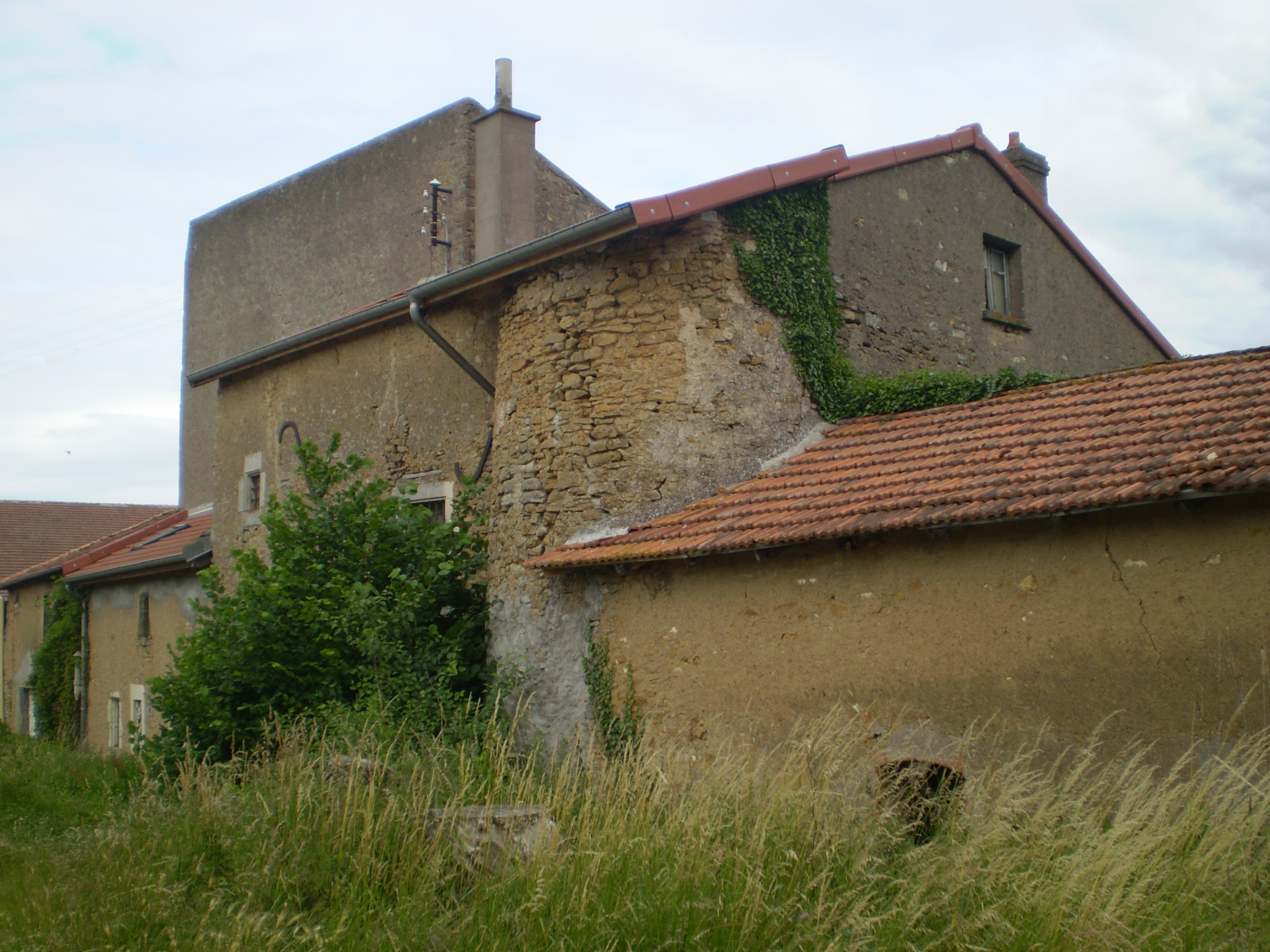
P6230417

- Gallo-Roman discoveries on Mount Saint Jean.
- Castles (or fortified houses) 14th/17th centuries. (see photos)

-Fortified-House "The Horgne" is an imposing building (now farm) which has a simple facade and a round tower on the back. It is located below the High Street at a place called "The Horgne".

-The second fortified-house is located high above the village, not far from the church. It has a facade with lattice windows and walled, above the front door, the date "1318" inscribed on the coat of arms of the lords of Jeandelaincourt. This one was also equipped with a round tower, now destroyed

- Some nice houses 19th Louis Adt Avenue.
- Church 14th century (Romanesque tower).
- Jeandelaincourt is known beyond the borders for his slate factory closed a few years ago.

== See also ==
- Communes of the Meurthe-et-Moselle department
