= Canton of Haroué =

Former canton in Meurthe-et-Moselle, France

Coordinates: 48°28′25″N 6°10′16″E

- Former canton
- Location of the canton in the arrondissement of Nancy
- Country: France
- Region: Grand Est
- Department: Meurthe-et-Moselle
- No. of communes: {{{nbcomm}}}
- Disbanded: 2015

Government
  - Representatives: André Barbier
- Area: 199.75 km^{2} (77.12 sq mi)
- Population (2012): 9,105
  - Density: 45.58/km^{2} (118.1/sq mi)

The canton of Haroué (French: Canton d'Haroué) is a former French canton located in the department of Meurthe-et-Moselle in the Lorraine region (now part of Grand Est). This canton was organized around Haroué in the arrondissement of Nancy. It is now part of the canton of Meine au Saintois.

The last general councillor from this canton was André Barbier (UMP), elected in 1998.

== Composition ==
The canton of Nomeny grouped together 30 municipalities and had 9,105 inhabitants (2012 census without double counts).

1. Affracourt
2. Bainville-aux-Miroirs
3. Benney
4. Bouzanville
5. Bralleville
6. Ceintrey
7. Crantenoy
8. Crévéchamps
9. Diarville
10. Gerbécourt-et-Haplemont
11. Germonville
12. Gripport
13. Haroué
14. Housséville
15. Jevoncourt
16. Laneuveville-devant-Bayon
17. Lebeuville
18. Lemainville
19. Leménil-Mitry
20. Mangonville
21. Neuviller-sur-Moselle
22. Ormes-et-Ville
23. Roville-devant-Bayon
24. Saint-Firmin
25. Saint-Remimont
26. Tantonville
27. Vaudeville
28. Vaudigny
29. Voinémont
30. Xirocourt
