= Saint-Remimont =

Saint-Remimont may refer to the following places in France:

- Saint-Remimont, Meurthe-et-Moselle, a commune in the Meurthe-et-Moselle department
- Saint-Remimont, Vosges, a commune in the Vosges department
