= Parey =

Parey may refer to the following communes in France:

- Parey-Saint-Césaire, in the Meurthe-et-Moselle department
- Parey-sous-Montfort, in the Vosges department

or to Parey, Saxony-Anhalt, part of the municipality Elbe-Parey, Saxony-Anhalt, Germany
