= Forcelles-sous-Gugney =

- Commune
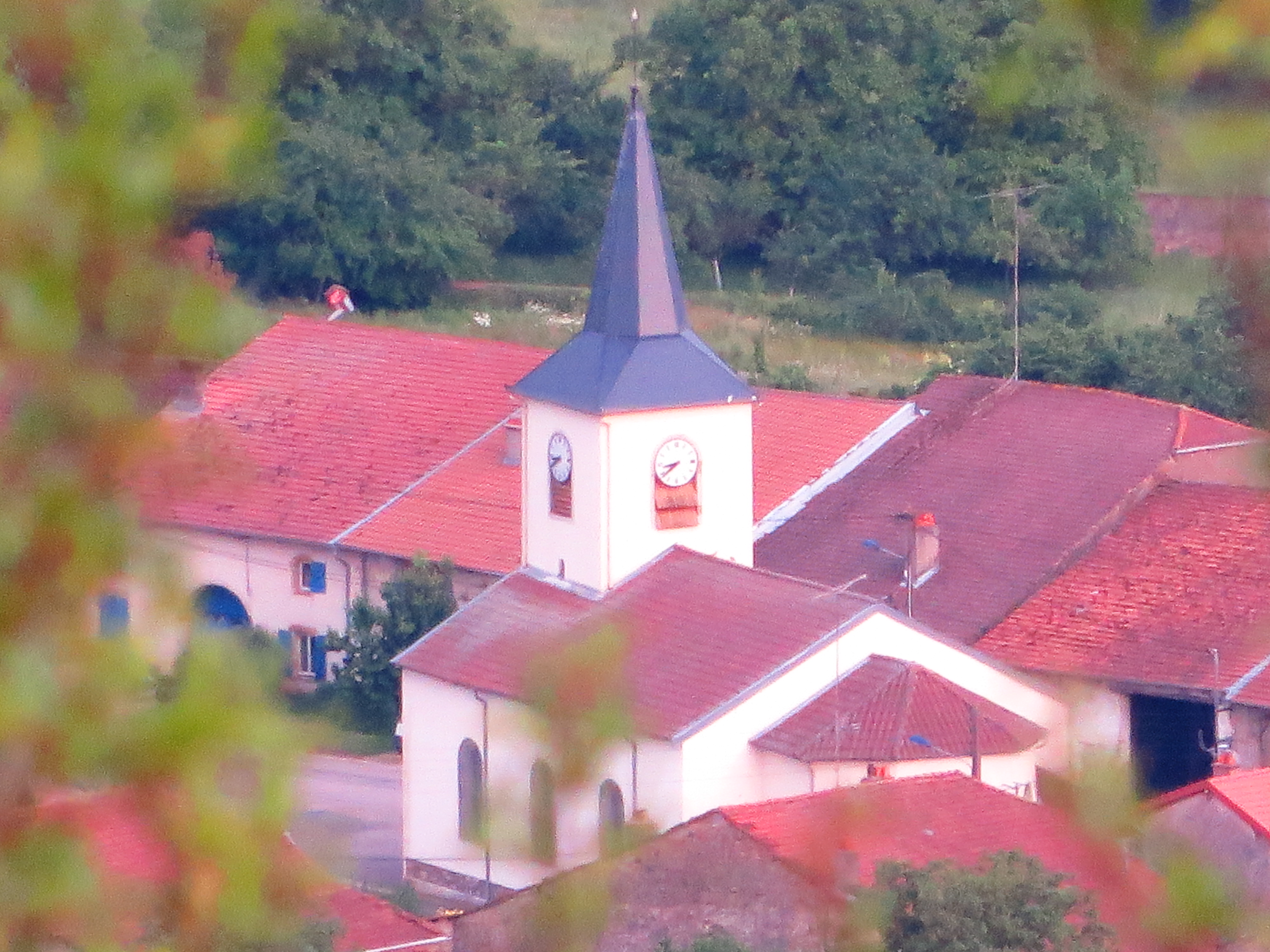
- The church in Forcelles-sous-Gugney

- Coat of arms
- Location of Forcelles-sous-Gugney
- Location within France Location within Grand Est
- Coordinates: 48°23′54″N 6°04′44″E
- Country: France
- Region: Grand Est
- Department: Meurthe-et-Moselle
- Arrondissement: Nancy
- Canton: Meine au Saintois
- Intercommunality: Pays du Saintois

Government
  - Mayor (2020–2026): Mathieu Saint Mihiel
- Area^{1}: 5.37 km^{2} (2.07 sq mi)
- Elevation: 307 m (1,007 ft)
- Highest elevation: 451 m (1,480 ft)
- Lowest elevation: 292 m (958 ft)
- Population (2023): 85
  - Density: 16/km^{2} (41/sq mi)
- Time zone: UTC+01:00 (CET)
  - Summer (DST): UTC+02:00 (CEST)
- INSEE/Postal code: 54204 /54930
- ^{1} French Land Register data, which excludes lakes, ponds, glaciers > 1 km^{2} (0.386 sq mi or 247 acres) and river estuaries.

Forcelles-sous-Gugney (French pronunciation: [fɔʁsɛl su ɡyɲɛ], literally Forcelles under Gugney) is a commune in the Meurthe-et-Moselle department in north-eastern France.

== See also ==
- Communes of the Meurthe-et-Moselle department
