= Vroncourt =

- Commune
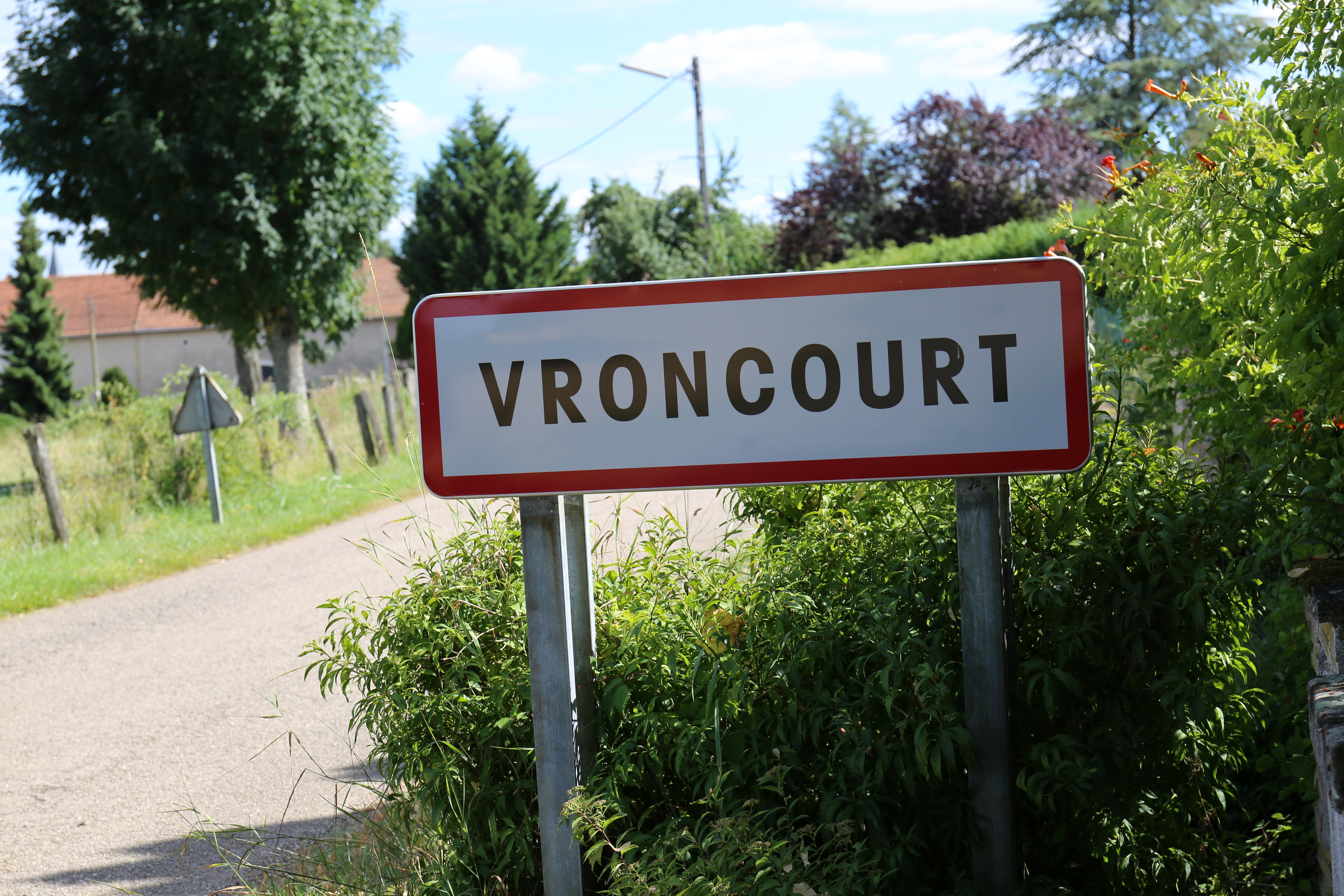
- An entrance sign into Vroncourt

- Coat of arms
- Location of Vroncourt
- Location within France Location within Grand Est
- Coordinates: 48°27′56″N 6°04′52″E
- Country: France
- Region: Grand Est
- Department: Meurthe-et-Moselle
- Arrondissement: Nancy
- Canton: Meine au Saintois
- Intercommunality: Pays du Saintois

Government
  - Mayor (2020–2026): Florian Larue
- Area^{1}: 4.16 km^{2} (1.61 sq mi)
- Elevation: 300 m (980 ft)
- Highest elevation: 337 m (1,106 ft)
- Lowest elevation: 289 m (948 ft)
- Population (2023): 273
  - Density: 65.6/km^{2} (170/sq mi)
- Time zone: UTC+01:00 (CET)
  - Summer (DST): UTC+02:00 (CEST)
- INSEE/Postal code: 54592 /54330
- ^{1} French Land Register data, which excludes lakes, ponds, glaciers > 1 km^{2} (0.386 sq mi or 247 acres) and river estuaries.

Vroncourt (French pronunciation: [vʁɔ̃kuʁ]) is a commune in the Meurthe-et-Moselle department in north-eastern France.

== See also ==
- Communes of the Meurthe-et-Moselle department
