= Ognéville =

- Commune
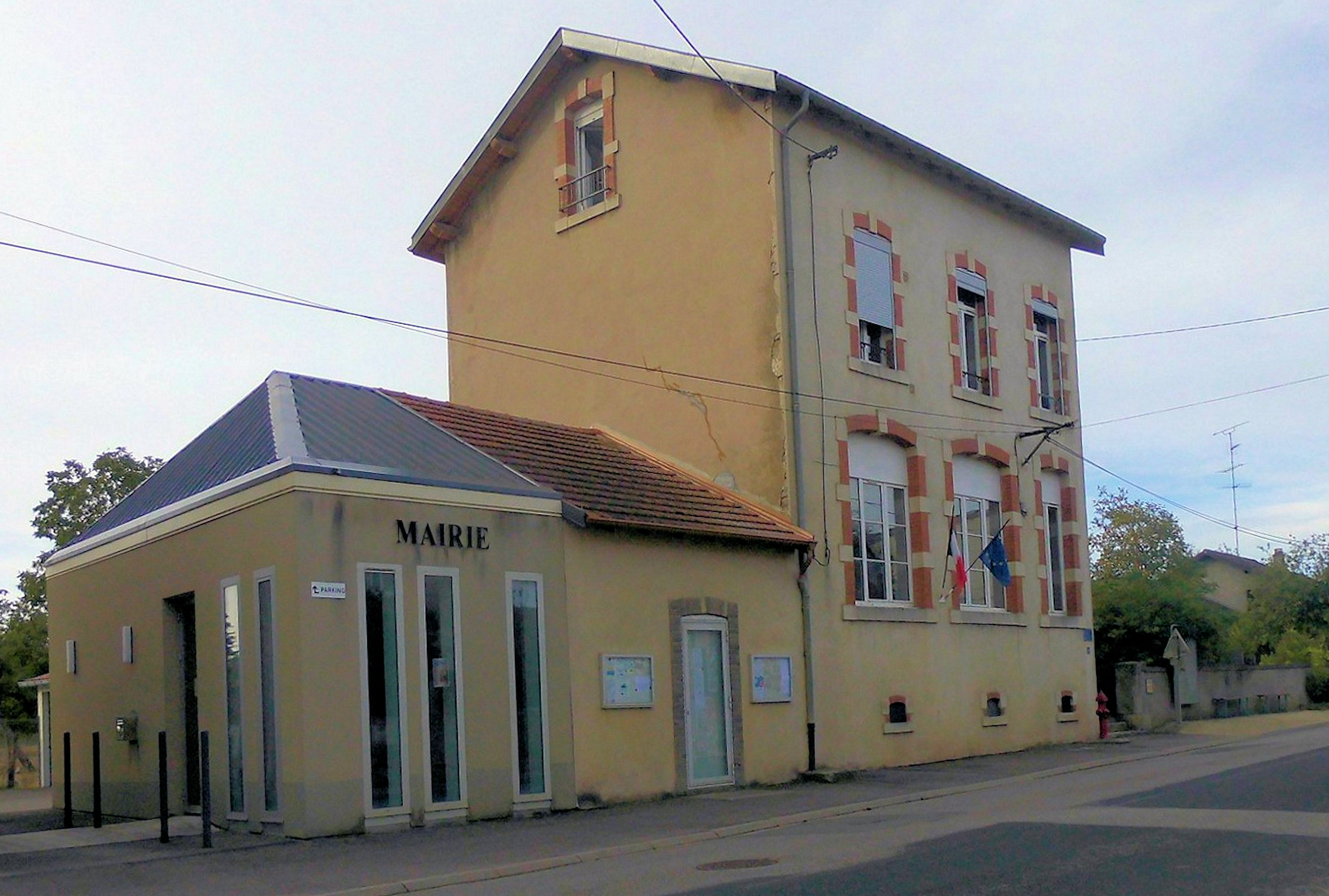
- The town hall in Ognéville

- Coat of arms
- Location of Ognéville
- Location within France Location within Grand Est
- Coordinates: 48°28′32″N 6°04′01″E
- Country: France
- Region: Grand Est
- Department: Meurthe-et-Moselle
- Arrondissement: Nancy
- Canton: Meine au Saintois
- Intercommunality: CC Pays du Saintois

Government
  - Mayor (2020–2026): Rudy Arnold
- Area^{1}: 4.12 km^{2} (1.59 sq mi)
- Elevation: 290 m (950 ft)
- Highest elevation: 328 m (1,076 ft)
- Lowest elevation: 253 m (830 ft)
- Population (2023): 87
  - Density: 21/km^{2} (55/sq mi)
- Time zone: UTC+01:00 (CET)
  - Summer (DST): UTC+02:00 (CEST)
- INSEE/Postal code: 54407 /54330
- ^{1} French Land Register data, which excludes lakes, ponds, glaciers > 1 km^{2} (0.386 sq mi or 247 acres) and river estuaries.

Ognéville (French pronunciation: [ɔɲevil]) is a commune in the Meurthe-et-Moselle department in north-eastern France.

== See also ==
- Communes of the Meurthe-et-Moselle department
