= Houdelmont =

- Commune
- Coat of arms
- Location of Houdelmont
- Location within France Location within Grand Est
- Coordinates: 48°32′07″N 6°05′25″E
- Country: France
- Region: Grand Est
- Department: Meurthe-et-Moselle
- Arrondissement: Nancy
- Canton: Meine au Saintois
- Intercommunality: CC Pays du Saintois

Government
  - Mayor (2023–2026): Vincent Schrotzenberger
- Area^{1}: 3.85 km^{2} (1.49 sq mi)
- Elevation: 280 m (920 ft)
- Highest elevation: 309 m (1,014 ft)
- Lowest elevation: 238 m (781 ft)
- Population (2023): 363
  - Density: 94.3/km^{2} (244/sq mi)
- Time zone: UTC+01:00 (CET)
  - Summer (DST): UTC+02:00 (CEST)
- INSEE/Postal code: 54264 /54330
- ^{1} French Land Register data, which excludes lakes, ponds, glaciers > 1 km^{2} (0.386 sq mi or 247 acres) and river estuaries.

Houdelmont (French pronunciation: [udɛlmɔ̃]) is a village and commune in the Meurthe-et-Moselle département of north-eastern France.

== See also ==
- Communes of the Meurthe-et-Moselle department
