= Dommarie-Eulmont =

- Commune
- Coat of arms
- Location of Dommarie-Eulmont
- Location within France Location within Grand Est
- Coordinates: 48°25′54″N 6°01′43″E
- Country: France
- Region: Grand Est
- Department: Meurthe-et-Moselle
- Arrondissement: Nancy
- Canton: Meine au Saintois
- Intercommunality: CC Pays du Saintois

Government
  - Mayor (2020–2026): Eric Deprugney
- Area^{1}: 5.52 km^{2} (2.13 sq mi)
- Elevation: 350 m (1,150 ft)
- Highest elevation: 492 m (1,614 ft)
- Lowest elevation: 291 m (955 ft)
- Population (2023): 74
  - Density: 13/km^{2} (35/sq mi)
- Time zone: UTC+01:00 (CET)
  - Summer (DST): UTC+02:00 (CEST)
- INSEE/Postal code: 54164 /54115
- ^{1} French Land Register data, which excludes lakes, ponds, glaciers > 1 km^{2} (0.386 sq mi or 247 acres) and river estuaries.

Dommarie-Eulmont (French pronunciation: [dɔmaʁi œlmɔ̃]) is a commune in the Meurthe-et-Moselle department in north-eastern France.

== See also ==
- Communes of the Meurthe-et-Moselle department
