= Quevilloncourt =

- Commune
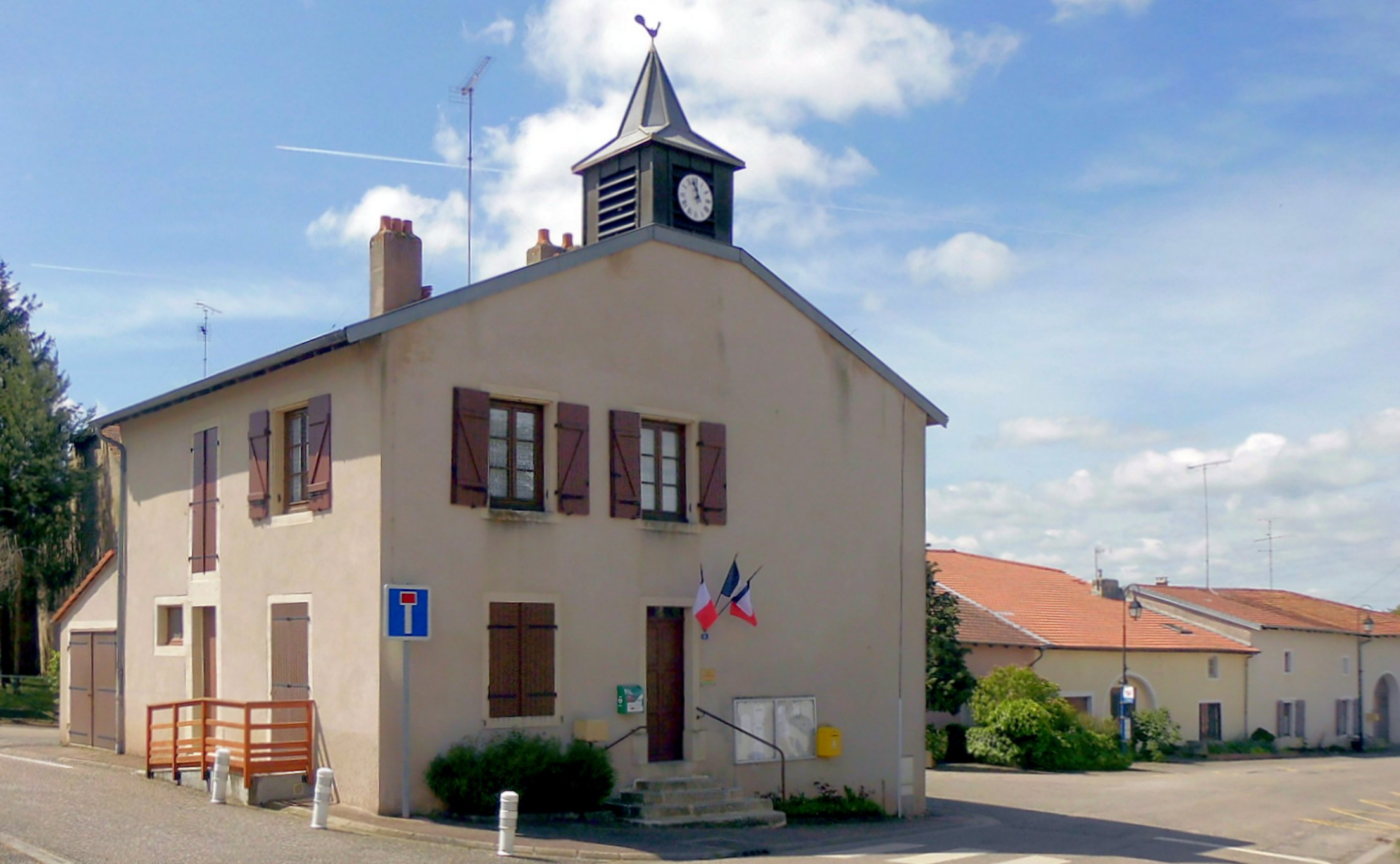
- The town hall in Quevilloncourt

- Coat of arms
- Location of Quevilloncourt
- Location within France Location within Grand Est
- Coordinates: 48°28′24″N 6°06′01″E
- Country: France
- Region: Grand Est
- Department: Meurthe-et-Moselle
- Arrondissement: Nancy
- Canton: Meine au Saintois

Government
  - Mayor (2020–2026): Francis Trotot
- Area^{1}: 2.92 km^{2} (1.13 sq mi)
- Elevation: 302 m (991 ft)
- Highest elevation: 327 m (1,073 ft)
- Lowest elevation: 267 m (876 ft)
- Population (2023): 96
  - Density: 33/km^{2} (85/sq mi)
- Time zone: UTC+01:00 (CET)
  - Summer (DST): UTC+02:00 (CEST)
- INSEE/Postal code: 54442 /54330
- ^{1} French Land Register data, which excludes lakes, ponds, glaciers > 1 km^{2} (0.386 sq mi or 247 acres) and river estuaries.

Quevilloncourt (French pronunciation: [kəvijɔ̃kuʁ]) is a commune in the Meurthe-et-Moselle department in north-eastern France.

== See also ==
- Communes of the Meurthe-et-Moselle department
