= They-sous-Vaudemont =

- Commune
- Coat of arms
- Location of They-sous-Vaudemont
- Location within France Location within Grand Est
- Coordinates: 48°24′18″N 6°03′36″E
- Country: France
- Region: Grand Est
- Department: Meurthe-et-Moselle
- Arrondissement: Nancy
- Canton: Meine au Saintois
- Intercommunality: Pays du Saintois

Government
  - Mayor (2024–2026): Didier Thomas
- Area^{1}: 1.7 km^{2} (0.66 sq mi)
- Elevation: 363 m (1,191 ft)
- Highest elevation: 489 m (1,604 ft)
- Lowest elevation: 331 m (1,086 ft)
- Population (2023): 17
  - Density: 10/km^{2} (26/sq mi)
- Time zone: UTC+01:00 (CET)
  - Summer (DST): UTC+02:00 (CEST)
- INSEE/Postal code: 54516 /54930
- ^{1} French Land Register data, which excludes lakes, ponds, glaciers > 1 km^{2} (0.386 sq mi or 247 acres) and river estuaries.

They-sous-Vaudemont (French pronunciation: [tɛ su vodemɔ̃], literally They under Vaudemont) is a commune in the Meurthe-et-Moselle department in north-eastern France.

== Population ==
Historical population
Year	Pop.	±% p.a.
1968	14	—
1975	13	−1.05%
1982	13	+0.00%
1990	11	−2.07%
1999	11	+0.00%
2007	13	+2.11%
2012	12	−1.59%
2017	14	+3.13%
2023	17	+3.29%
Source: INSEE

== See also ==
- Communes of the Meurthe-et-Moselle department
