= Marthemont =

- Commune
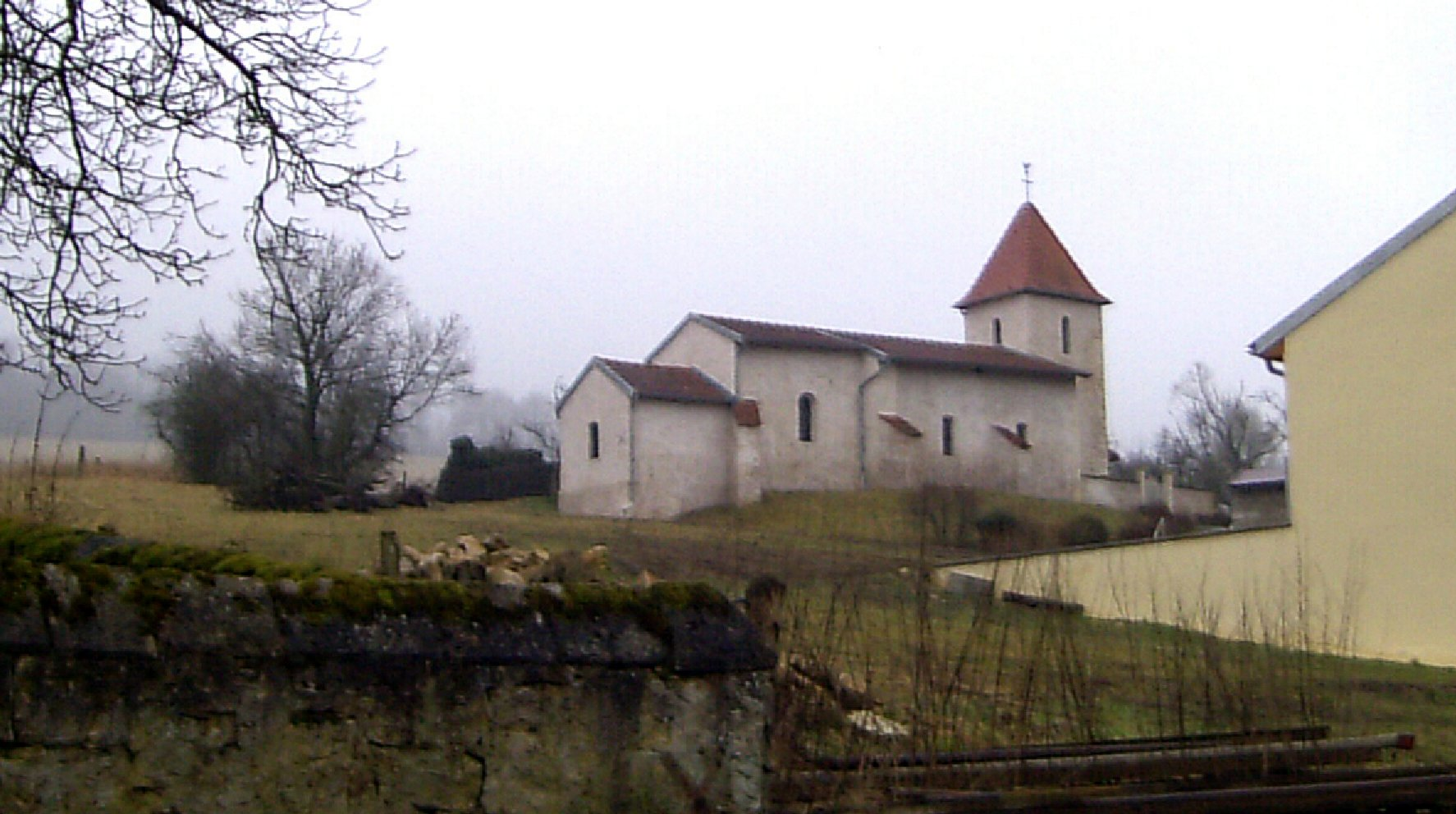
- The church in Marthemont

- Coat of arms
- Location of Marthemont
- Location within France Location within Grand Est
- Coordinates: 48°33′37″N 6°02′29″E
- Country: France
- Region: Grand Est
- Department: Meurthe-et-Moselle
- Arrondissement: Nancy
- Canton: Meine au Saintois

Government
  - Mayor (2020–2026): Philippe Eberhardt
- Area^{1}: 2.17 km^{2} (0.84 sq mi)
- Elevation: 280 m (920 ft)
- Highest elevation: 437 m (1,434 ft)
- Lowest elevation: 260 m (850 ft)
- Population (2023): 52
  - Density: 24/km^{2} (62/sq mi)
- Time zone: UTC+01:00 (CET)
  - Summer (DST): UTC+02:00 (CEST)
- INSEE/Postal code: 54354 /54330
- ^{1} French Land Register data, which excludes lakes, ponds, glaciers > 1 km^{2} (0.386 sq mi or 247 acres) and river estuaries.

Marthemont (French pronunciation: [maʁtəmɔ̃]) is a commune in the Meurthe-et-Moselle department in north-eastern France.

== See also ==
- Communes of the Meurthe-et-Moselle department
