= Hammeville =

- Commune
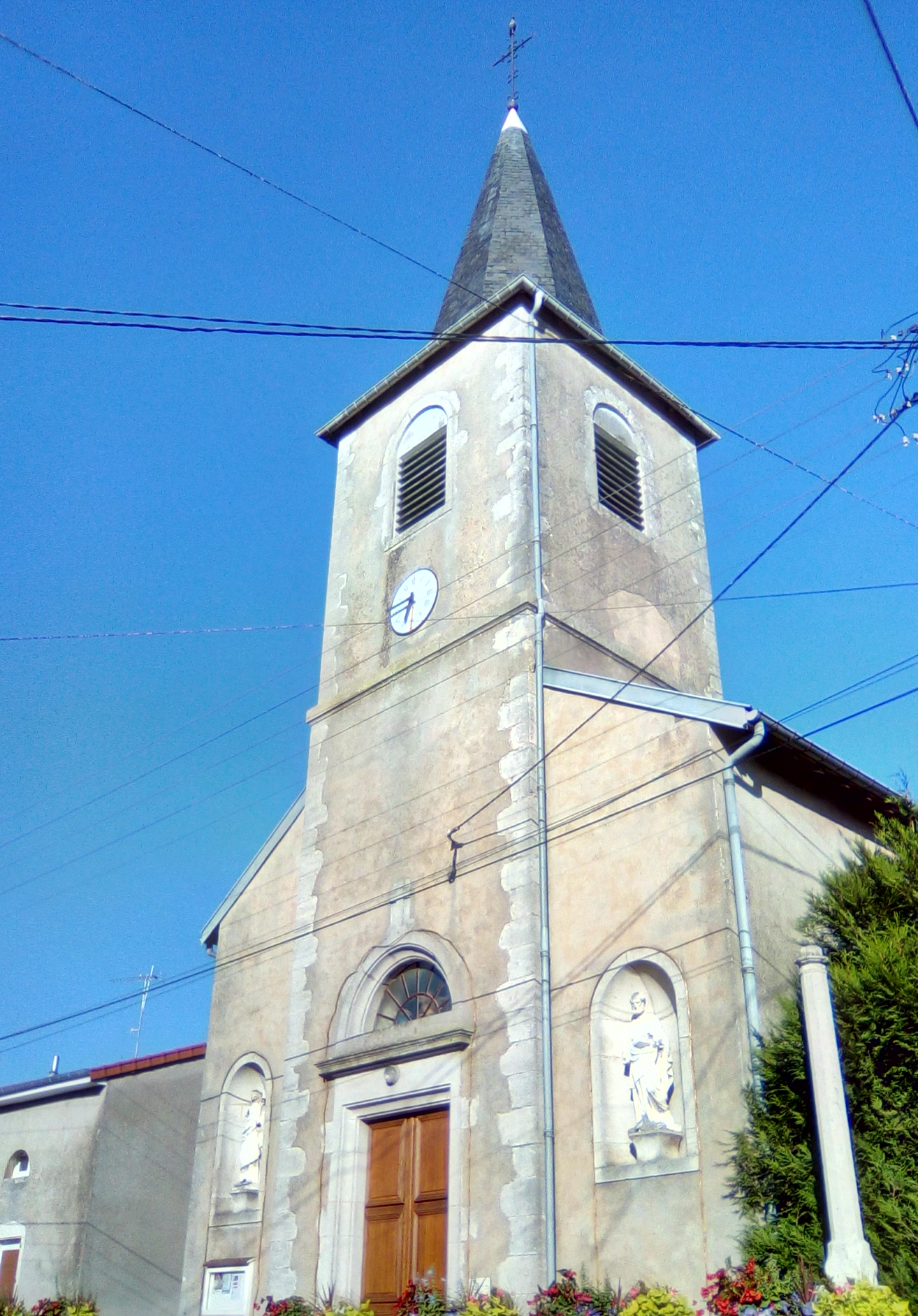
- The church in Hammeville

- Coat of arms
- Location of Hammeville
- Location within France Location within Grand Est
- Coordinates: 48°30′00″N 6°04′01″E
- Country: France
- Region: Grand Est
- Department: Meurthe-et-Moselle
- Arrondissement: Nancy
- Canton: Meine au Saintois
- Intercommunality: Pays du Saintois

Government
  - Mayor (2020–2026): Nicolas Pargon
- Area^{1}: 5.45 km^{2} (2.10 sq mi)
- Elevation: 300 m (980 ft)
- Highest elevation: 317 m (1,040 ft)
- Lowest elevation: 247 m (810 ft)
- Population (2023): 195
  - Density: 35.8/km^{2} (92.7/sq mi)
- Time zone: UTC+01:00 (CET)
  - Summer (DST): UTC+02:00 (CEST)
- INSEE/Postal code: 54247 /54330
- ^{1} French Land Register data, which excludes lakes, ponds, glaciers > 1 km^{2} (0.386 sq mi or 247 acres) and river estuaries.

Hammeville (French pronunciation: [amvil]) is a commune in the Meurthe-et-Moselle department in north-eastern France. The T-shaped village of Hammeville, which has a population of 174 (2015), sits atop a rise surrounded by agricultural fields. The mainstay of the economy is farming, although there are an increasing number of people building homes in the village and commuting to work in Nancy and other places. In August 1976, in order to deal with a drought that had stunted a number of crops, men from the village were forced to travel to south-central France in order to load transport trucks with hay for the village's farms.

== See also ==
- Communes of the Meurthe-et-Moselle department
