= Vitrey =

- Commune
- Coat of arms
- Location of Vitrey
- Location within France Location within Grand Est
- Coordinates: 48°29′15″N 6°02′50″E
- Country: France
- Region: Grand Est
- Department: Meurthe-et-Moselle
- Arrondissement: Nancy
- Canton: Meine au Saintois
- Intercommunality: CC Pays du Saintois

Government
  - Mayor (2020–2026): Mireille Malglaive
- Area^{1}: 11.54 km^{2} (4.46 sq mi)
- Elevation: 258 m (846 ft)
- Highest elevation: 350 m (1,150 ft)
- Lowest elevation: 260 m (850 ft)
- Population (2023): 193
  - Density: 16.7/km^{2} (43.3/sq mi)
- Time zone: UTC+01:00 (CET)
  - Summer (DST): UTC+02:00 (CEST)
- INSEE/Postal code: 54587 /54330
- ^{1} French Land Register data, which excludes lakes, ponds, glaciers > 1 km^{2} (0.386 sq mi or 247 acres) and river estuaries.

Vitrey (French pronunciation: [vitʁɛ]) is a commune in the Meurthe-et-Moselle department in north-eastern France.

== See also ==
- Communes of the Meurthe-et-Moselle department
