= Houdreville =

- Commune
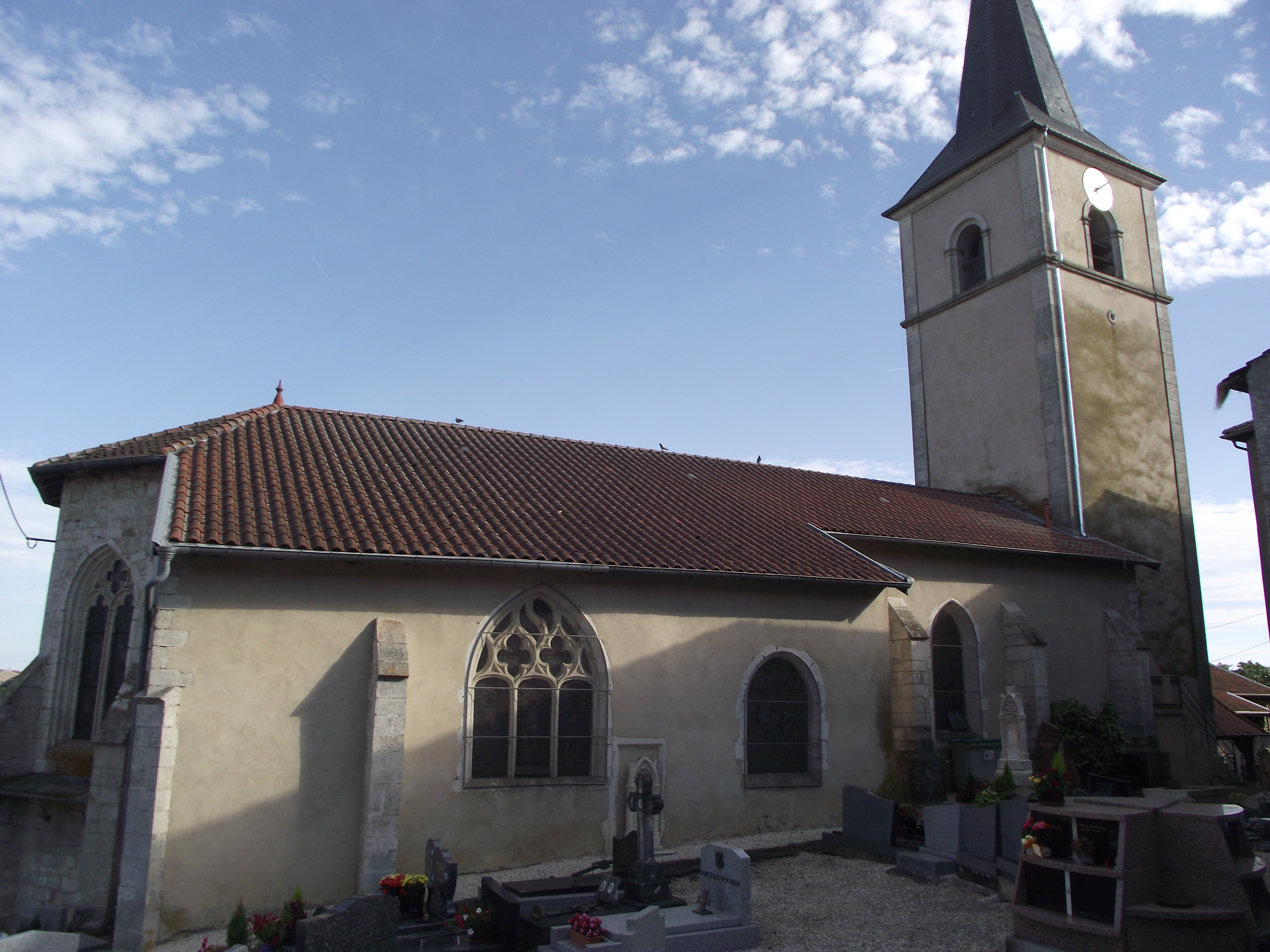
- The church in Houdreville

- Coat of arms
- Location of Houdreville
- Location within France Location within Grand Est
- Coordinates: 48°30′27″N 6°06′17″E
- Country: France
- Region: Grand Est
- Department: Meurthe-et-Moselle
- Arrondissement: Nancy
- Canton: Meine au Saintois

Government
  - Mayor (2020–2026): Bernard Peignier
- Area^{1}: 10.37 km^{2} (4.00 sq mi)
- Elevation: 310 m (1,020 ft)
- Highest elevation: 319 m (1,047 ft)
- Lowest elevation: 233 m (764 ft)
- Population (2023): 403
  - Density: 38.9/km^{2} (101/sq mi)
- Time zone: UTC+01:00 (CET)
  - Summer (DST): UTC+02:00 (CEST)
- INSEE/Postal code: 54266 /54330
- ^{1} French Land Register data, which excludes lakes, ponds, glaciers > 1 km^{2} (0.386 sq mi or 247 acres) and river estuaries.

Houdreville (French pronunciation: [udʁəvil]) is a commune in the Meurthe-et-Moselle department in north-eastern France.

== See also ==
- Communes of the Meurthe-et-Moselle department
