= Chaouilley =

- Commune
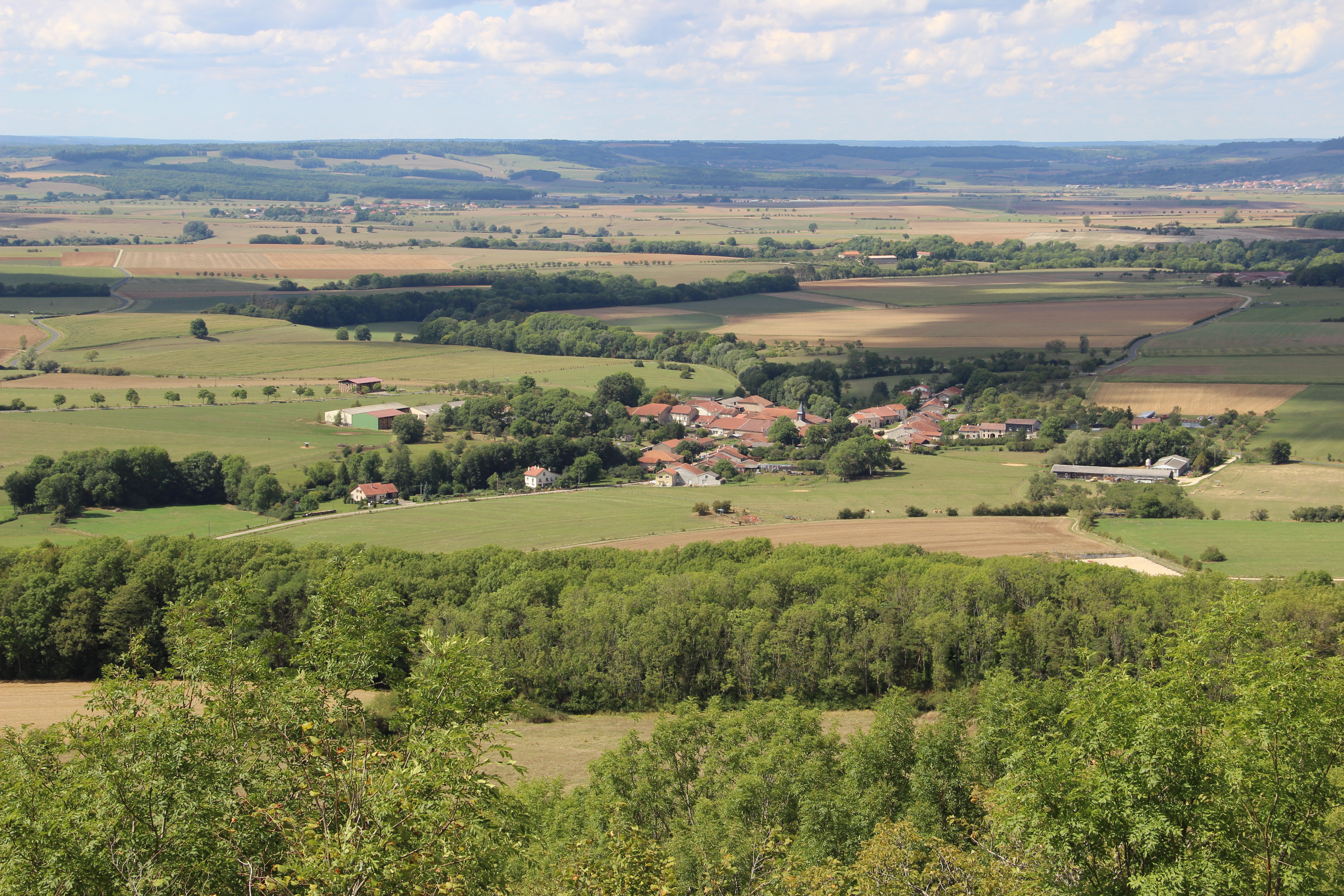
- A general view of Chaouilley

- Coat of arms
- Location of Chaouilley
- Location within France Location within Grand Est
- Coordinates: 48°26′23″N 6°04′08″E
- Country: France
- Region: Grand Est
- Department: Meurthe-et-Moselle
- Arrondissement: Nancy
- Canton: Meine au Saintois
- Intercommunality: CC Pays du Saintois

Government
  - Mayor (2020–2026): Éric Perrotez
- Area^{1}: 5.12 km^{2} (1.98 sq mi)
- Elevation: 315 m (1,033 ft)
- Highest elevation: 401 m (1,316 ft)
- Lowest elevation: 289 m (948 ft)
- Population (2023): 111
  - Density: 21.7/km^{2} (56.2/sq mi)
- Time zone: UTC+01:00 (CET)
  - Summer (DST): UTC+02:00 (CEST)
- INSEE/Postal code: 54117 /54330
- ^{1} French Land Register data, which excludes lakes, ponds, glaciers > 1 km^{2} (0.386 sq mi or 247 acres) and river estuaries.

Chaouilley is a commune in the Meurthe-et-Moselle department in north-eastern France.

== See also ==
- Communes of the Meurthe-et-Moselle department
