= Forcelles-Saint-Gorgon =

- Commune
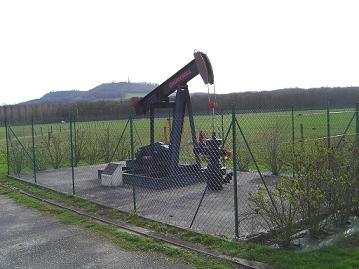
- A pumpjack in Forcelles Saint-Gorgon

- Coat of arms
- Location of Forcelles-Saint-Gorgon
- Location within France Location within Grand Est
- Coordinates: 48°27′25″N 6°06′07″E
- Country: France
- Region: Grand Est
- Department: Meurthe-et-Moselle
- Arrondissement: Nancy
- Canton: Meine au Saintois
- Intercommunality: CC Pays du Saintois

Government
  - Mayor (2020–2026): Éric Pierrat
- Area^{1}: 5.36 km^{2} (2.07 sq mi)
- Elevation: 323 m (1,060 ft)
- Highest elevation: 338 m (1,109 ft)
- Lowest elevation: 288 m (945 ft)
- Population (2023): 168
  - Density: 31.3/km^{2} (81.2/sq mi)
- Time zone: UTC+01:00 (CET)
  - Summer (DST): UTC+02:00 (CEST)
- INSEE/Postal code: 54203 /54330
- ^{1} French Land Register data, which excludes lakes, ponds, glaciers > 1 km^{2} (0.386 sq mi or 247 acres) and river estuaries.

Forcelles-Saint-Gorgon (French pronunciation: [fɔʁsɛl sɛ̃ ɡɔʁɡɔ̃]) is a commune in the Meurthe-et-Moselle department in north-eastern France.

== See also ==
- Communes of the Meurthe-et-Moselle department
