= Omelmont =

- Commune
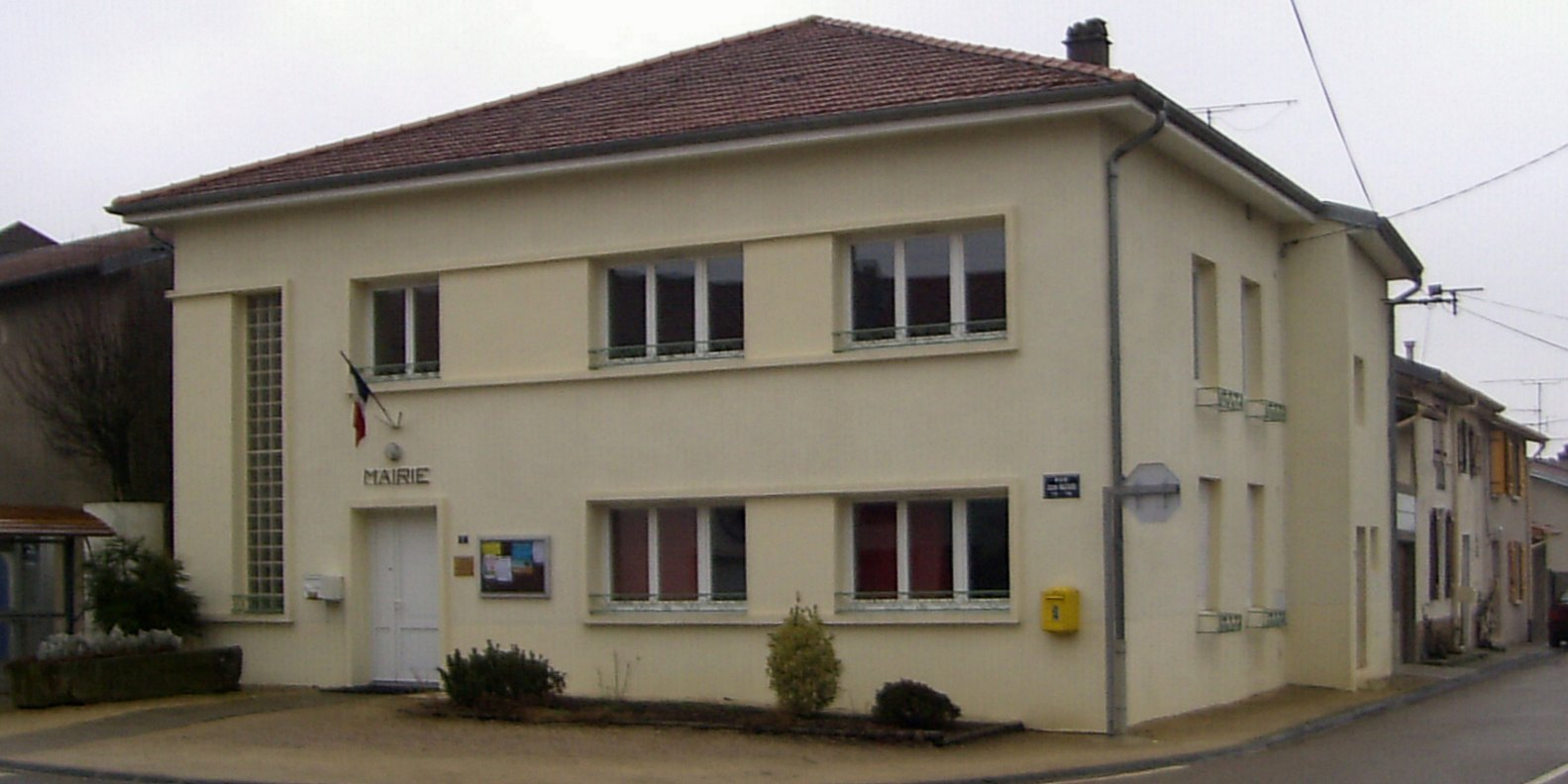
- The town hall in Omelmont

- Coat of arms
- Location of Omelmont
- Location within France Location within Grand Est
- Coordinates: 48°30′05″N 6°06′45″E
- Country: France
- Region: Grand Est
- Department: Meurthe-et-Moselle
- Arrondissement: Nancy
- Canton: Meine au Saintois
- Intercommunality: CC Pays du Saintois

Government
  - Mayor (2020–2026): Michel Henrion
- Area^{1}: 4.69 km^{2} (1.81 sq mi)
- Elevation: 294 m (965 ft)
- Highest elevation: 307 m (1,007 ft)
- Lowest elevation: 265 m (869 ft)
- Population (2023): 192
  - Density: 40.9/km^{2} (106/sq mi)
- Time zone: UTC+01:00 (CET)
  - Summer (DST): UTC+02:00 (CEST)
- INSEE/Postal code: 54409 /54330
- ^{1} French Land Register data, which excludes lakes, ponds, glaciers > 1 km^{2} (0.386 sq mi or 247 acres) and river estuaries.

Omelmont (French pronunciation: [ɔmɛlmɔ̃]) is a commune in the Meurthe-et-Moselle department in north-eastern France.

== See also ==
- Communes of the Meurthe-et-Moselle department
