= Fraisnes-en-Saintois =

- Commune
- Coat of arms
- Location of Fraisnes-en-Saintois
- Location within France Location within Grand Est
- Coordinates: 48°22′35″N 6°03′27″E
- Country: France
- Region: Grand Est
- Department: Meurthe-et-Moselle
- Arrondissement: Nancy
- Canton: Meine au Saintois
- Intercommunality: Pays du Saintois

Government
  - Mayor (2020–2026): Eric Boucher
- Area^{1}: 6.39 km^{2} (2.47 sq mi)
- Elevation: 320 m (1,050 ft)
- Highest elevation: 515 m (1,690 ft)
- Lowest elevation: 291 m (955 ft)
- Population (2023): 85
  - Density: 13/km^{2} (34/sq mi)
- Time zone: UTC+01:00 (CET)
  - Summer (DST): UTC+02:00 (CEST)
- INSEE/Postal code: 54207 /54930
- ^{1} French Land Register data, which excludes lakes, ponds, glaciers > 1 km^{2} (0.386 sq mi or 247 acres) and river estuaries.

Fraisnes-en-Saintois (French pronunciation: [fʁɛn ɑ̃ sɛ̃twa], lit. 'Fraisnes in Saintois') is a commune in the Meurthe-et-Moselle department in north-eastern France.

== See also ==
- Communes of the Meurthe-et-Moselle department
