= Clérey-sur-Brenon =

- Commune
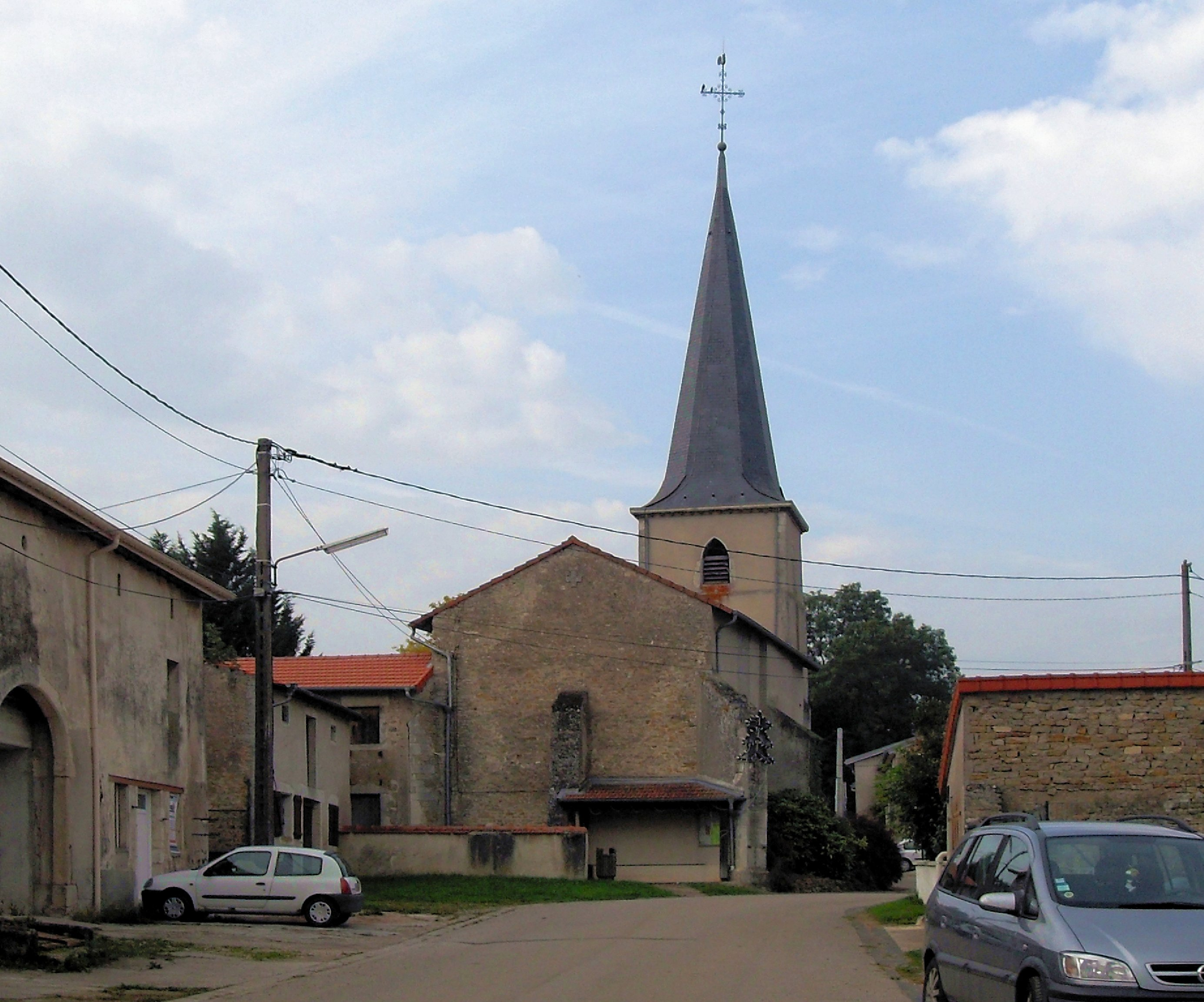
- The church in Clérey-sur-Brenon

- Coat of arms
- Location of Clérey-sur-Brenon
- Location within France Location within Grand Est
- Coordinates: 48°30′31″N 6°08′17″E
- Country: France
- Region: Grand Est
- Department: Meurthe-et-Moselle
- Arrondissement: Nancy
- Canton: Meine au Saintois
- Intercommunality: CC Pays du Saintois

Government
  - Mayor (2024–2026): Yann Timon
- Area^{1}: 4.42 km^{2} (1.71 sq mi)
- Elevation: 260 m (850 ft)
- Highest elevation: 285 m (935 ft)
- Lowest elevation: 233 m (764 ft)
- Population (2023): 57
  - Density: 13/km^{2} (33/sq mi)
- Time zone: UTC+01:00 (CET)
  - Summer (DST): UTC+02:00 (CEST)
- INSEE/Postal code: 54132 /54330
- ^{1} French Land Register data, which excludes lakes, ponds, glaciers > 1 km^{2} (0.386 sq mi or 247 acres) and river estuaries.

Clérey-sur-Brenon is a commune in the Meurthe-et-Moselle department in north-eastern France.

== See also ==
- Communes of the Meurthe-et-Moselle department
