= Viterne =

- Commune
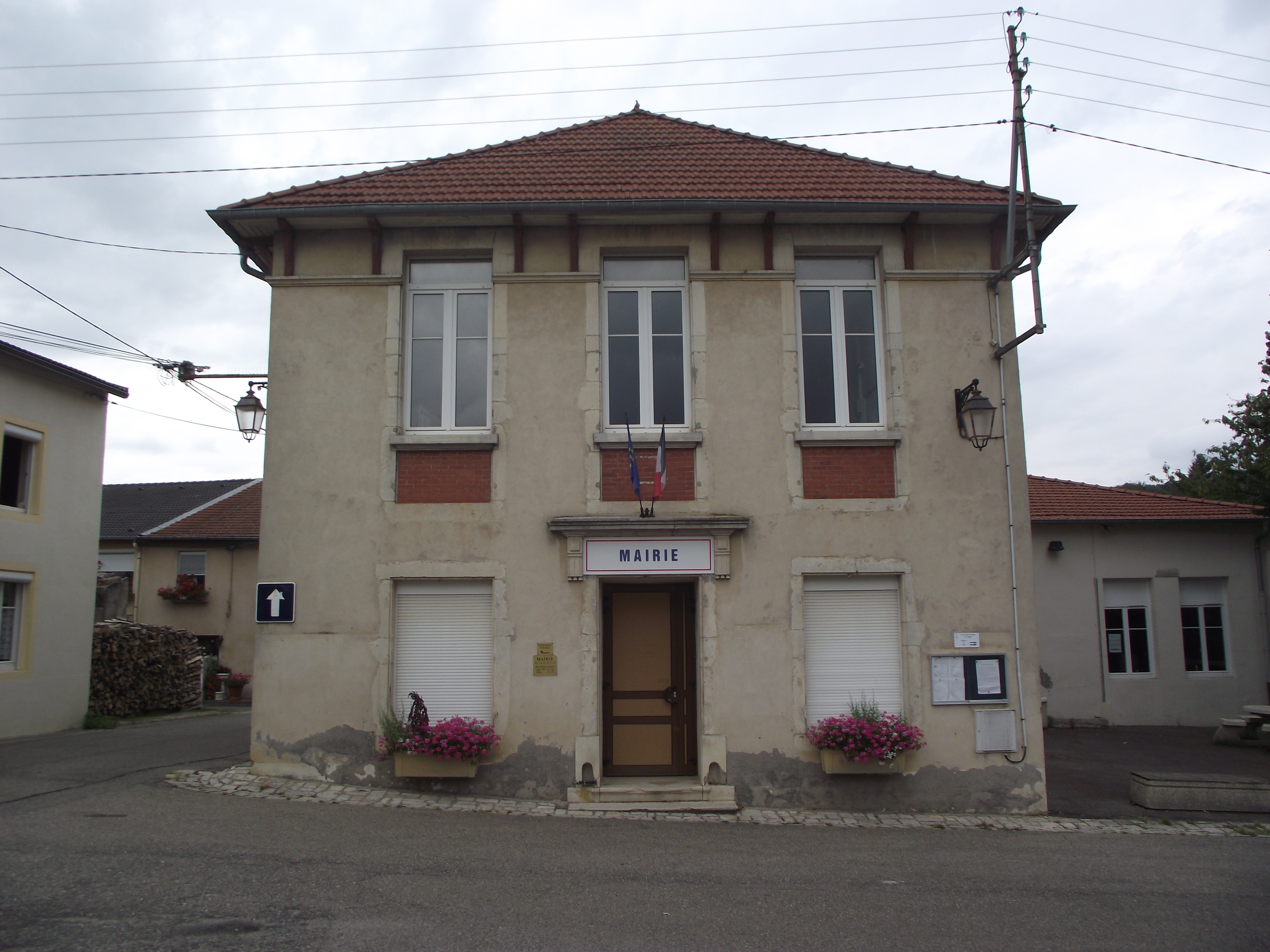
- The town hall in Viterne

- Coat of arms
- Location of Viterne
- Location within France Location within Grand Est
- Coordinates: 48°35′19″N 6°02′01″E
- Country: France
- Region: Grand Est
- Department: Meurthe-et-Moselle
- Arrondissement: Nancy
- Canton: Meine au Saintois
- Intercommunality: CC Moselle et Madon

Government
  - Mayor (2020–2026): Jean-Marc Dupon
- Area^{1}: 23.17 km^{2} (8.95 sq mi)
- Elevation: 250 m (820 ft)
- Highest elevation: 443 m (1,453 ft)
- Lowest elevation: 250 m (820 ft)
- Population (2023): 738
  - Density: 31.9/km^{2} (82.5/sq mi)
- Time zone: UTC+01:00 (CET)
  - Summer (DST): UTC+02:00 (CEST)
- INSEE/Postal code: 54586 /54123
- ^{1} French Land Register data, which excludes lakes, ponds, glaciers > 1 km^{2} (0.386 sq mi or 247 acres) and river estuaries.

Viterne (French pronunciation: [vitɛʁn]) is a commune in the Meurthe-et-Moselle department in north-eastern France.

== See also ==
- Communes of the Meurthe-et-Moselle department
