= Lalœuf =

Laloeuf
- Commune
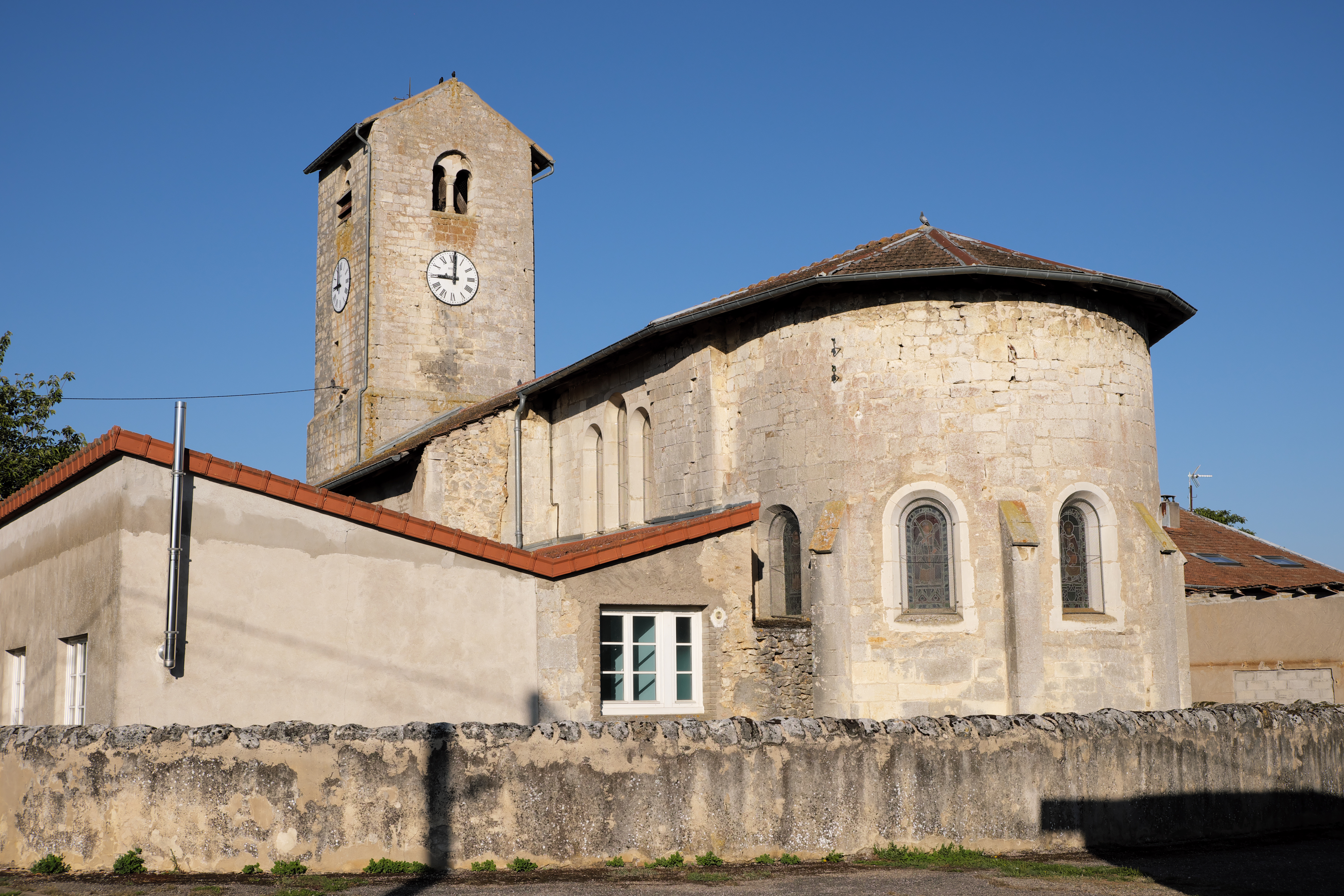
- The church of Saint-Rémy of Puxe in Lalœuf

- Coat of arms
- Location of Laloeuf
- Location within France Location within Grand Est
- Coordinates: 48°27′37″N 6°00′58″E
- Country: France
- Region: Grand Est
- Department: Meurthe-et-Moselle
- Arrondissement: Nancy
- Canton: Meine au Saintois
- Intercommunality: CC Pays du Saintois

Government
  - Mayor (2020–2026): Olivier Bergé
- Area^{1}: 10.68 km^{2} (4.12 sq mi)
- Elevation: 300 m (980 ft)
- Highest elevation: 405 m (1,329 ft)
- Lowest elevation: 279 m (915 ft)
- Population (2023): 306
  - Density: 28.7/km^{2} (74.2/sq mi)
- Time zone: UTC+01:00 (CET)
  - Summer (DST): UTC+02:00 (CEST)
- INSEE/Postal code: 54291 /54115
- ^{1} French Land Register data, which excludes lakes, ponds, glaciers > 1 km^{2} (0.386 sq mi or 247 acres) and river estuaries.

Lalœuf (French pronunciation: [lalœf]) is a commune in the Meurthe-et-Moselle department in north-eastern France.

== See also ==
- Communes of the Meurthe-et-Moselle department
