= Thélod =

- Commune
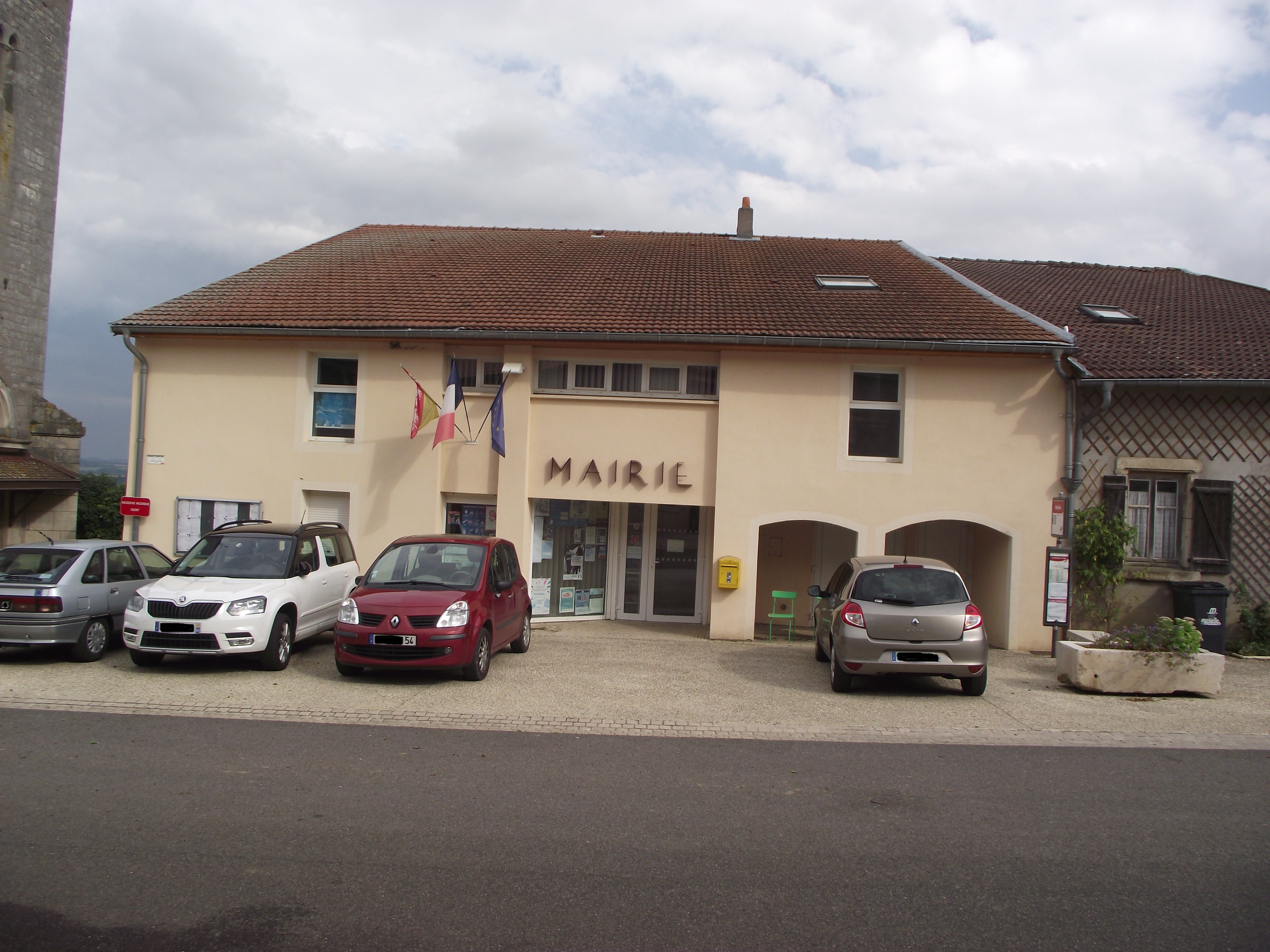
- The town hall in Thélod

- Coat of arms
- Location of Thélod
- Location within France Location within Grand Est
- Coordinates: 48°32′47″N 6°02′46″E
- Country: France
- Region: Grand Est
- Department: Meurthe-et-Moselle
- Arrondissement: Nancy
- Canton: Meine au Saintois
- Intercommunality: Moselle et Madon

Government
  - Mayor (2020–2026): Anne-Marie Rothon
- Area^{1}: 10.76 km^{2} (4.15 sq mi)
- Elevation: 360 m (1,180 ft)
- Highest elevation: 446 m (1,463 ft)
- Lowest elevation: 243 m (797 ft)
- Population (2023): 251
  - Density: 23.3/km^{2} (60.4/sq mi)
- Time zone: UTC+01:00 (CET)
  - Summer (DST): UTC+02:00 (CEST)
- INSEE/Postal code: 54515 /54330
- ^{1} French Land Register data, which excludes lakes, ponds, glaciers > 1 km^{2} (0.386 sq mi or 247 acres) and river estuaries.

Thélod (French pronunciation: [telo]) is a commune in the Meurthe-et-Moselle department in north-eastern France.

== See also ==
- Communes of the Meurthe-et-Moselle department
