= Goviller =

- Commune
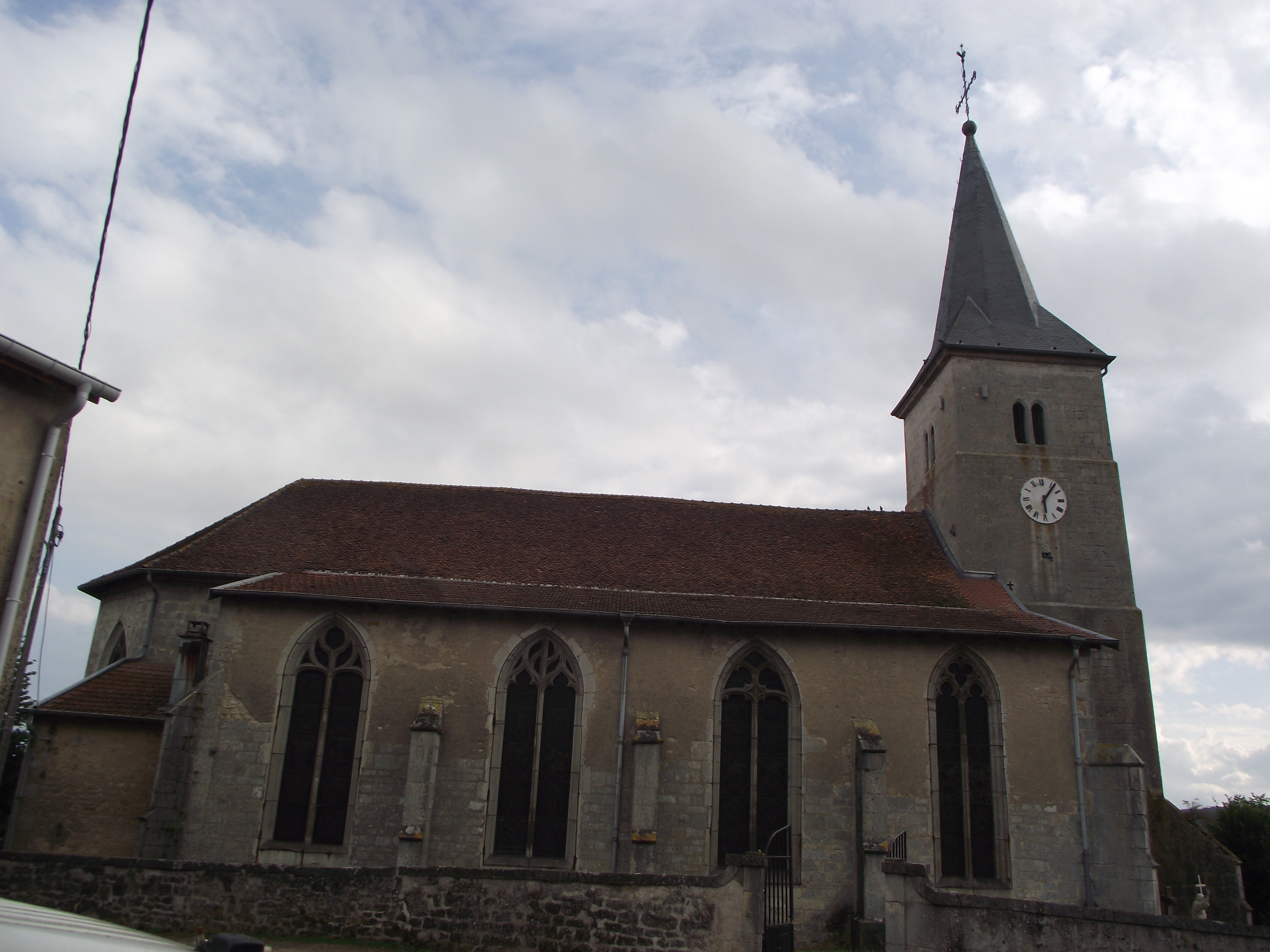
- The church in Goviller

- Coat of arms
- Location of Goviller
- Location within France Location within Grand Est
- Coordinates: 48°29′53″N 6°00′42″E
- Country: France
- Region: Grand Est
- Department: Meurthe-et-Moselle
- Arrondissement: Nancy
- Canton: Meine au Saintois
- Intercommunality: CC Pays du Saintois

Government
  - Mayor (2020–2026): Stéphanie Lapotre
- Area^{1}: 12.12 km^{2} (4.68 sq mi)
- Elevation: 280 m (920 ft)
- Highest elevation: 439 m (1,440 ft)
- Lowest elevation: 272 m (892 ft)
- Population (2023): 418
  - Density: 34.5/km^{2} (89.3/sq mi)
- Time zone: UTC+01:00 (CET)
  - Summer (DST): UTC+02:00 (CEST)
- INSEE/Postal code: 54235 /54330
- ^{1} French Land Register data, which excludes lakes, ponds, glaciers > 1 km^{2} (0.386 sq mi or 247 acres) and river estuaries.

Goviller (French pronunciation: [ɡɔvile]) is a commune in the Meurthe-et-Moselle department in north-eastern France. The village sits at the foot of the iconic Bois d'Anon, the round-shaped woods atop a prominent hill which can be seen from kilometres away, and is surrounded mainly by agricultural lands.

== See also ==
- Communes of the Meurthe-et-Moselle department
