= Étreval =

- Commune
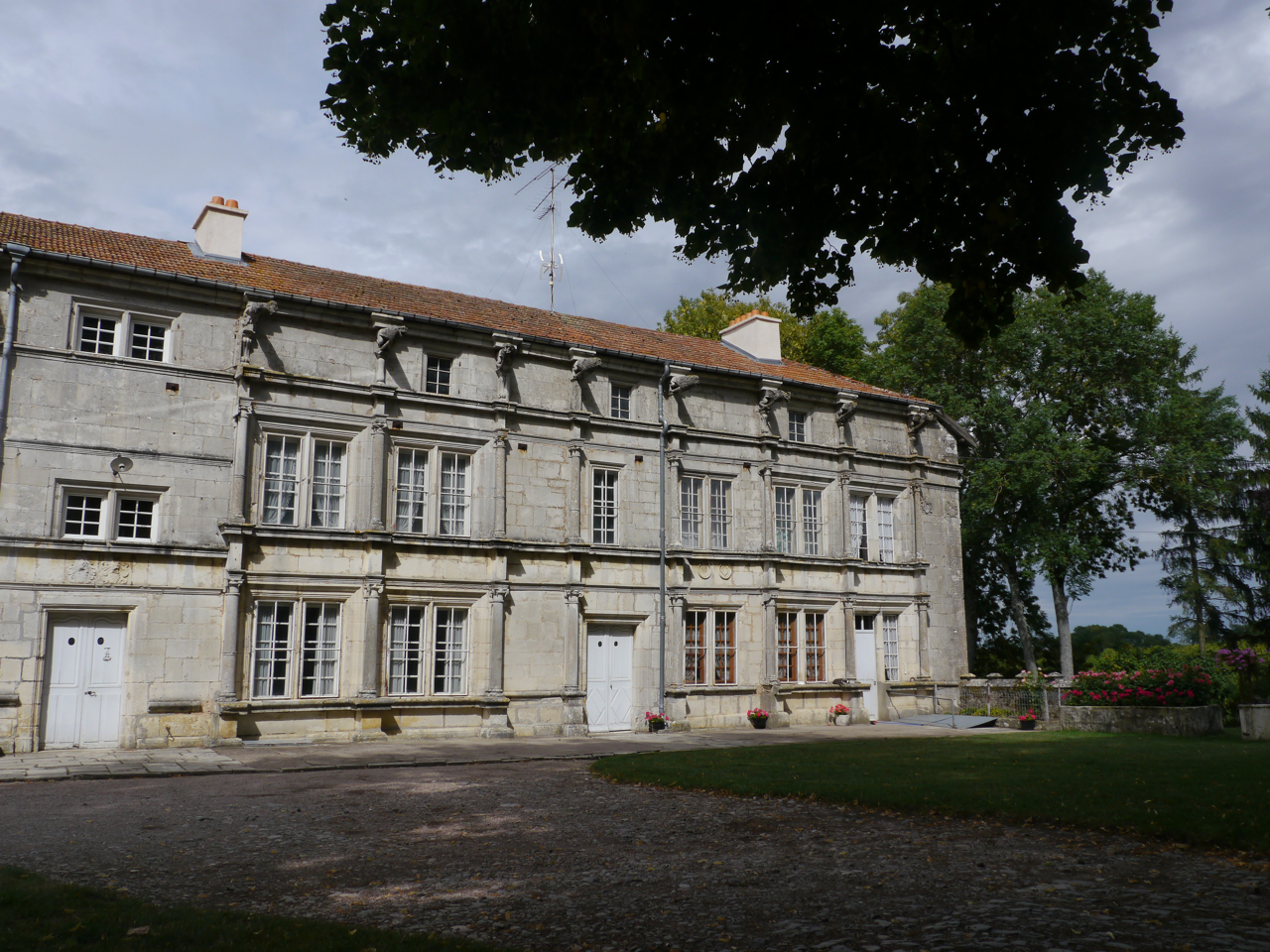
- The chateau in Étreval

- Coat of arms
- Location of Étreval
- Location within France Location within Grand Est
- Coordinates: 48°27′22″N 6°03′08″E
- Country: France
- Region: Grand Est
- Department: Meurthe-et-Moselle
- Arrondissement: Nancy
- Canton: Meine au Saintois
- Intercommunality: CC Pays du Saintois

Government
  - Mayor (2020–2026): Michaël Martin
- Area^{1}: 2.37 km^{2} (0.92 sq mi)
- Elevation: 272 m (892 ft)
- Highest elevation: 328 m (1,076 ft)
- Lowest elevation: 265 m (869 ft)
- Population (2023): 59
  - Density: 25/km^{2} (64/sq mi)
- Time zone: UTC+01:00 (CET)
  - Summer (DST): UTC+02:00 (CEST)
- INSEE/Postal code: 54185 /54330
- ^{1} French Land Register data, which excludes lakes, ponds, glaciers > 1 km^{2} (0.386 sq mi or 247 acres) and river estuaries.

Étreval (French pronunciation: [etʁəval]) is a commune in the Meurthe-et-Moselle department in north-eastern France.

== See also ==
- Communes of the Meurthe-et-Moselle department
