= Lebeuville =

- Commune
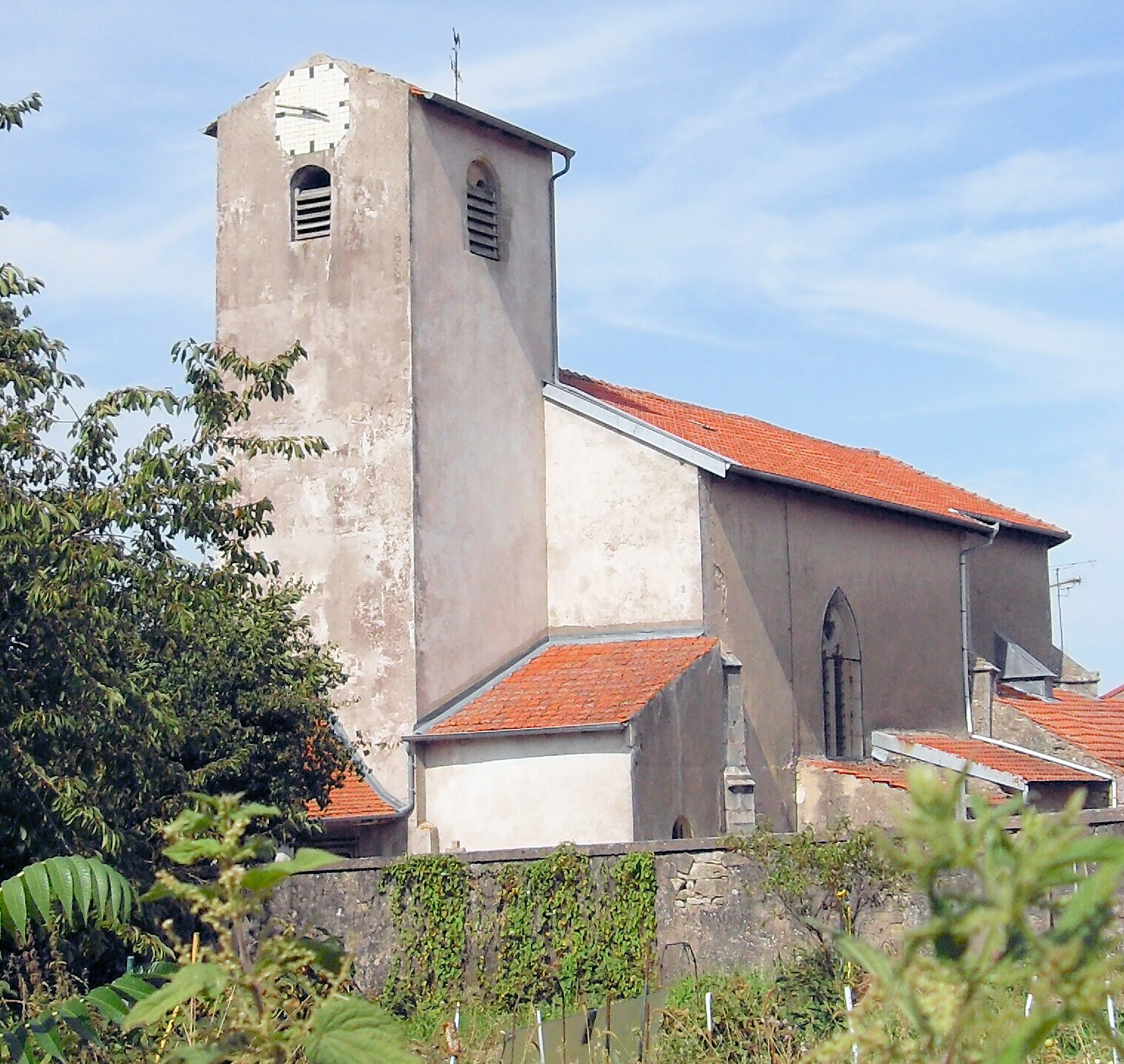
- The church in Lebeuville

- Coat of arms
- Location of Lebeuville
- Location within France Location within Grand Est
- Coordinates: 48°26′05″N 6°14′47″E
- Country: France
- Region: Grand Est
- Department: Meurthe-et-Moselle
- Arrondissement: Nancy
- Canton: Meine au Saintois
- Intercommunality: Pays du Saintois

Government
  - Mayor (2020–2026): Florent Michel
- Area^{1}: 6.22 km^{2} (2.40 sq mi)
- Elevation: 299 m (981 ft)
- Highest elevation: 376 m (1,234 ft)
- Lowest elevation: 280 m (920 ft)
- Population (2023): 146
  - Density: 23.5/km^{2} (60.8/sq mi)
- Time zone: UTC+01:00 (CET)
  - Summer (DST): UTC+02:00 (CEST)
- INSEE/Postal code: 54307 /54740
- ^{1} French Land Register data, which excludes lakes, ponds, glaciers > 1 km^{2} (0.386 sq mi or 247 acres) and river estuaries.

Lebeuville (French pronunciation: [ləbøvil]) is a commune in the Meurthe-et-Moselle department in north-eastern France.

== See also ==
- Communes of the Meurthe-et-Moselle department
