= Gugney =

- Commune
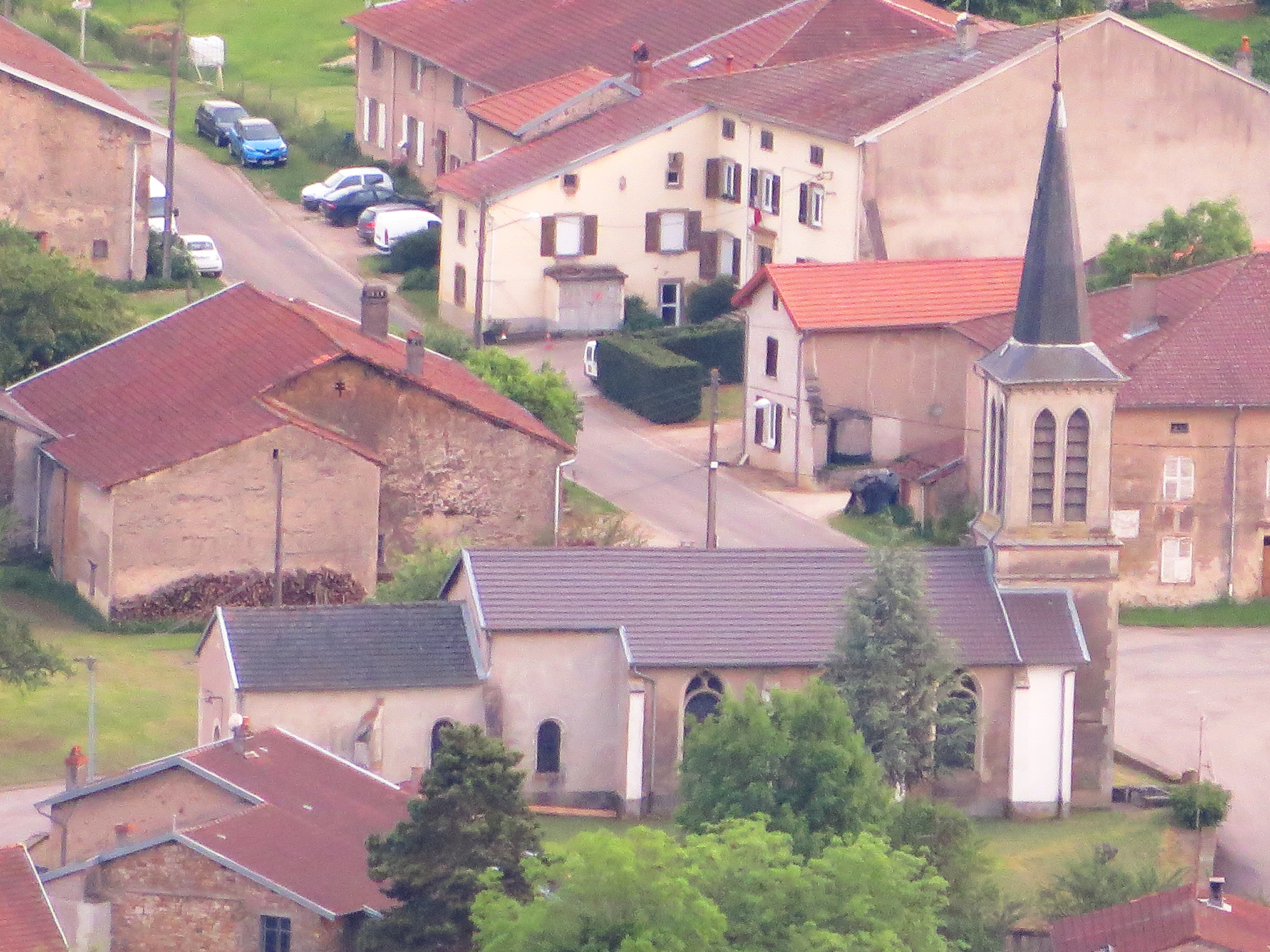
- The church in Gugney

- Coat of arms
- Location of Gugney
- Location within France Location within Grand Est
- Coordinates: 48°23′57″N 6°03′47″E
- Country: France
- Region: Grand Est
- Department: Meurthe-et-Moselle
- Arrondissement: Nancy
- Canton: Meine au Saintois
- Intercommunality: Pays du Saintois

Government
  - Mayor (2020–2026): François Py
- Area^{1}: 2.93 km^{2} (1.13 sq mi)
- Elevation: 300 m (980 ft)
- Highest elevation: 520 m (1,710 ft)
- Lowest elevation: 316 m (1,037 ft)
- Population (2023): 67
  - Density: 23/km^{2} (59/sq mi)
- Time zone: UTC+01:00 (CET)
  - Summer (DST): UTC+02:00 (CEST)
- INSEE/Postal code: 54241 /54930
- ^{1} French Land Register data, which excludes lakes, ponds, glaciers > 1 km^{2} (0.386 sq mi or 247 acres) and river estuaries.

Gugney (French pronunciation: [ɡyɲɛ]) is a commune in the Meurthe-et-Moselle department in north-eastern France.

== See also ==
- Communes of the Meurthe-et-Moselle department
