= Canton of Meine au Saintois =

Canton in Grand Est, France

Coordinates: 48.49°N 6.09°E

The canton of Meine au Saintois is an administrative division of the Meurthe-et-Moselle department, northeastern France. It was created at the French canton reorganisation which came into effect in March 2015. Its seat is in Vézelise.

It consists of the following communes:

1. Aboncourt
2. Affracourt
3. Allain
4. Allamps
5. Autrey
6. Bagneux
7. Bainville-aux-Miroirs
8. Barisey-au-Plain
9. Barisey-la-Côte
10. Battigny
11. Benney
12. Beuvezin
13. Blénod-lès-Toul
14. Bouzanville
15. Bralleville
16. Bulligny
17. Ceintrey
18. Chaouilley
19. Clérey-sur-Brenon
20. Colombey-les-Belles
21. Courcelles
22. Crantenoy
23. Crépey
24. Crévéchamps
25. Crézilles
26. Diarville
27. Dolcourt
28. Dommarie-Eulmont
29. Étreval
30. Favières
31. Fécocourt
32. Forcelles-Saint-Gorgon
33. Forcelles-sous-Gugney
34. Fraisnes-en-Saintois
35. Gélaucourt
36. Gémonville
37. Gerbécourt-et-Haplemont
38. Germiny
39. Germonville
40. Gibeaumeix
41. Goviller
42. Grimonviller
43. Gripport
44. Gugney
45. Hammeville
46. Haroué
47. Houdelmont
48. Houdreville
49. Housséville
50. Jevoncourt
51. Lalœuf
52. Laneuveville-devant-Bayon
53. Lebeuville
54. Lemainville
55. Leménil-Mitry
56. Mangonville
57. Marthemont
58. Mont-l'Étroit
59. Mont-le-Vignoble
60. Moutrot
61. Neuviller-sur-Moselle
62. Ochey
63. Ognéville
64. Omelmont
65. Ormes-et-Ville
66. Parey-Saint-Césaire
67. Pierreville
68. Praye
69. Pulney
70. Quevilloncourt
71. Roville-devant-Bayon
72. Saint-Firmin
73. Saint-Remimont
74. Saulxerotte
75. Saulxures-lès-Vannes
76. Saxon-Sion
77. Selaincourt
78. Tantonville
79. Thélod
80. They-sous-Vaudemont
81. Thorey-Lyautey
82. Thuilley-aux-Groseilles
83. Tramont-Émy
84. Tramont-Lassus
85. Tramont-Saint-André
86. Uruffe
87. Vandeléville
88. Vannes-le-Châtel
89. Vaudémont
90. Vaudeville
91. Vaudigny
92. Vézelise
93. Viterne
94. Vitrey
95. Voinémont
96. Vroncourt
97. Xeuilley
98. Xirocourt
