= Housséville =

- Commune
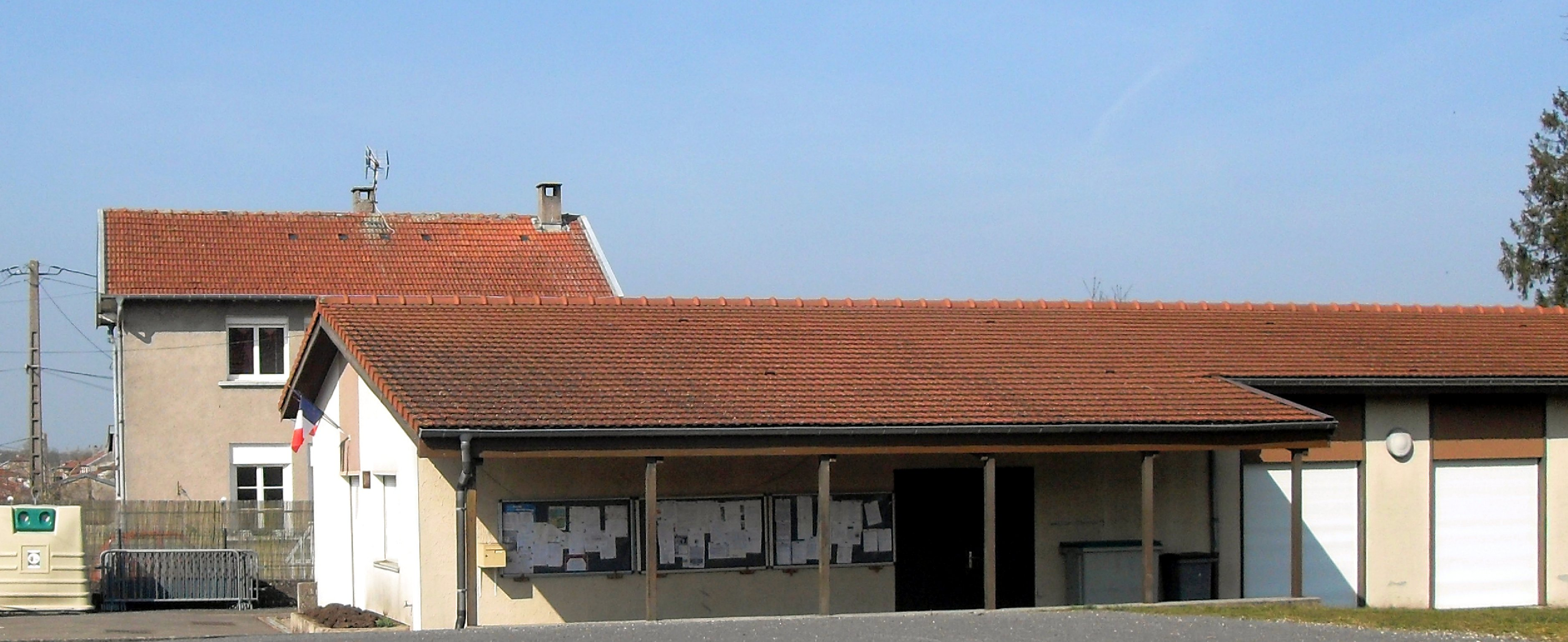
- The town hall in Housséville

- Coat of arms
- Location of Housséville
- Location within France Location within Grand Est
- Coordinates: 48°24′25″N 6°07′07″E
- Country: France
- Region: Grand Est
- Department: Meurthe-et-Moselle
- Arrondissement: Nancy
- Canton: Meine au Saintois
- Intercommunality: Pays du Saintois

Government
  - Mayor (2020–2026): Geneviève Pernot-Trevillot
- Area^{1}: 5.33 km^{2} (2.06 sq mi)
- Elevation: 280 m (920 ft)
- Highest elevation: 320 m (1,050 ft)
- Lowest elevation: 275 m (902 ft)
- Population (2023): 139
  - Density: 26.1/km^{2} (67.5/sq mi)
- Time zone: UTC+01:00 (CET)
  - Summer (DST): UTC+02:00 (CEST)
- INSEE/Postal code: 54268 /54930
- ^{1} French Land Register data, which excludes lakes, ponds, glaciers > 1 km^{2} (0.386 sq mi or 247 acres) and river estuaries.

Housséville (French pronunciation: [usevil]) is a commune in the Meurthe-et-Moselle department in north-eastern France.

== See also ==
- Communes of the Meurthe-et-Moselle department
