= Gripport =

- Commune
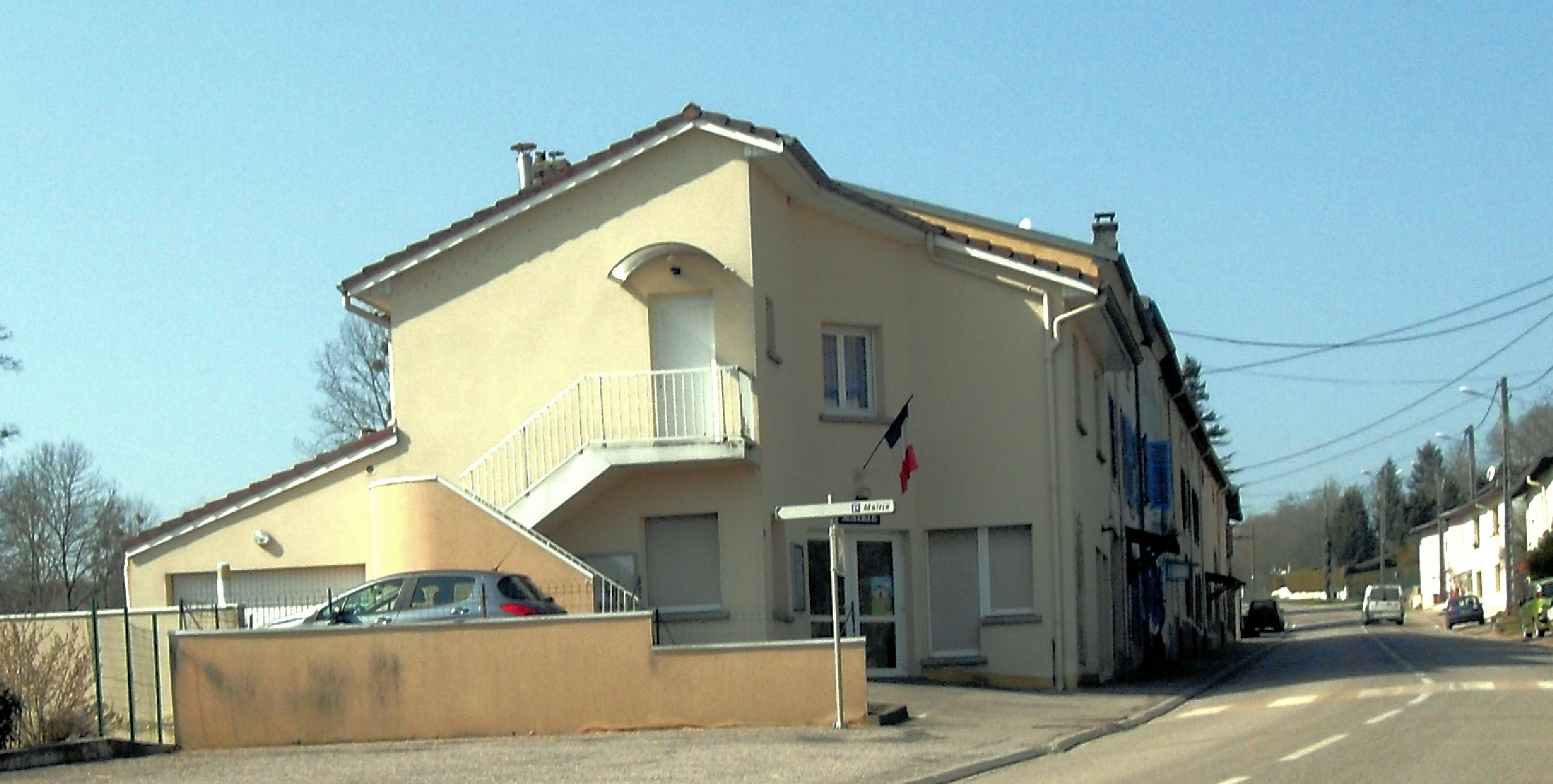
- The town hall in Gripport

- Coat of arms
- Location of Gripport
- Location within France Location within Grand Est
- Coordinates: 48°24′56″N 6°15′14″E
- Country: France
- Region: Grand Est
- Department: Meurthe-et-Moselle
- Arrondissement: Nancy
- Canton: Meine au Saintois
- Intercommunality: CC Pays du Saintois

Government
  - Mayor (2021–2026): Marie-Madeleine Schlachter
- Area^{1}: 5.74 km^{2} (2.22 sq mi)
- Elevation: 280 m (920 ft)
- Highest elevation: 389 m (1,276 ft)
- Lowest elevation: 255 m (837 ft)
- Population (2023): 264
  - Density: 46.0/km^{2} (119/sq mi)
- Time zone: UTC+01:00 (CET)
  - Summer (DST): UTC+02:00 (CEST)
- INSEE/Postal code: 54238 /54290
- ^{1} French Land Register data, which excludes lakes, ponds, glaciers > 1 km^{2} (0.386 sq mi or 247 acres) and river estuaries.

Gripport (French pronunciation: [ɡʁipɔʁ]) is a commune in the Meurthe-et-Moselle department in northeastern France.

== See also ==
- Communes of the Meurthe-et-Moselle department
