= Germonville =

- Commune
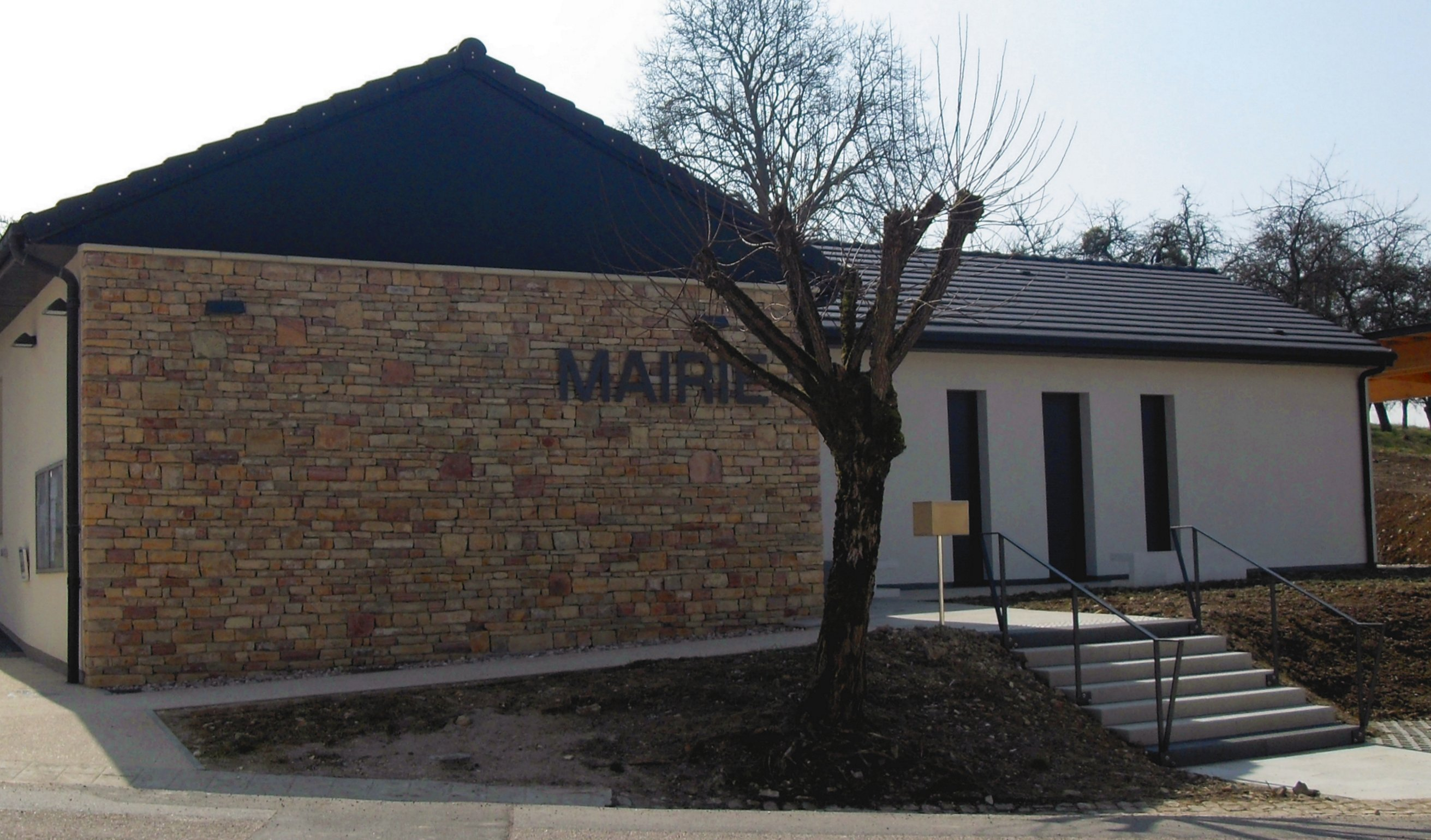
- The town hall in Germonville

- Coat of arms
- Location of Germonville
- Location within France Location within Grand Est
- Coordinates: 48°24′28″N 6°12′47″E
- Country: France
- Region: Grand Est
- Department: Meurthe-et-Moselle
- Arrondissement: Nancy
- Canton: Meine au Saintois
- Intercommunality: CC Pays du Saintois

Government
  - Mayor (2020–2026): Christian Oge
- Area^{1}: 5.21 km^{2} (2.01 sq mi)
- Elevation: 309 m (1,014 ft)
- Highest elevation: 382 m (1,253 ft)
- Lowest elevation: 283 m (928 ft)
- Population (2023): 133
  - Density: 25.5/km^{2} (66.1/sq mi)
- Time zone: UTC+01:00 (CET)
  - Summer (DST): UTC+02:00 (CEST)
- INSEE/Postal code: 54224 /54740
- ^{1} French Land Register data, which excludes lakes, ponds, glaciers > 1 km^{2} (0.386 sq mi or 247 acres) and river estuaries.

Germonville (French pronunciation: [ʒɛʁmɔ̃vil]) is a commune in the Meurthe-et-Moselle department in north-eastern France.

== See also ==
- Communes of the Meurthe-et-Moselle department
