= Saint-Firmin, Meurthe-et-Moselle =

Saint-Firmin
- Commune
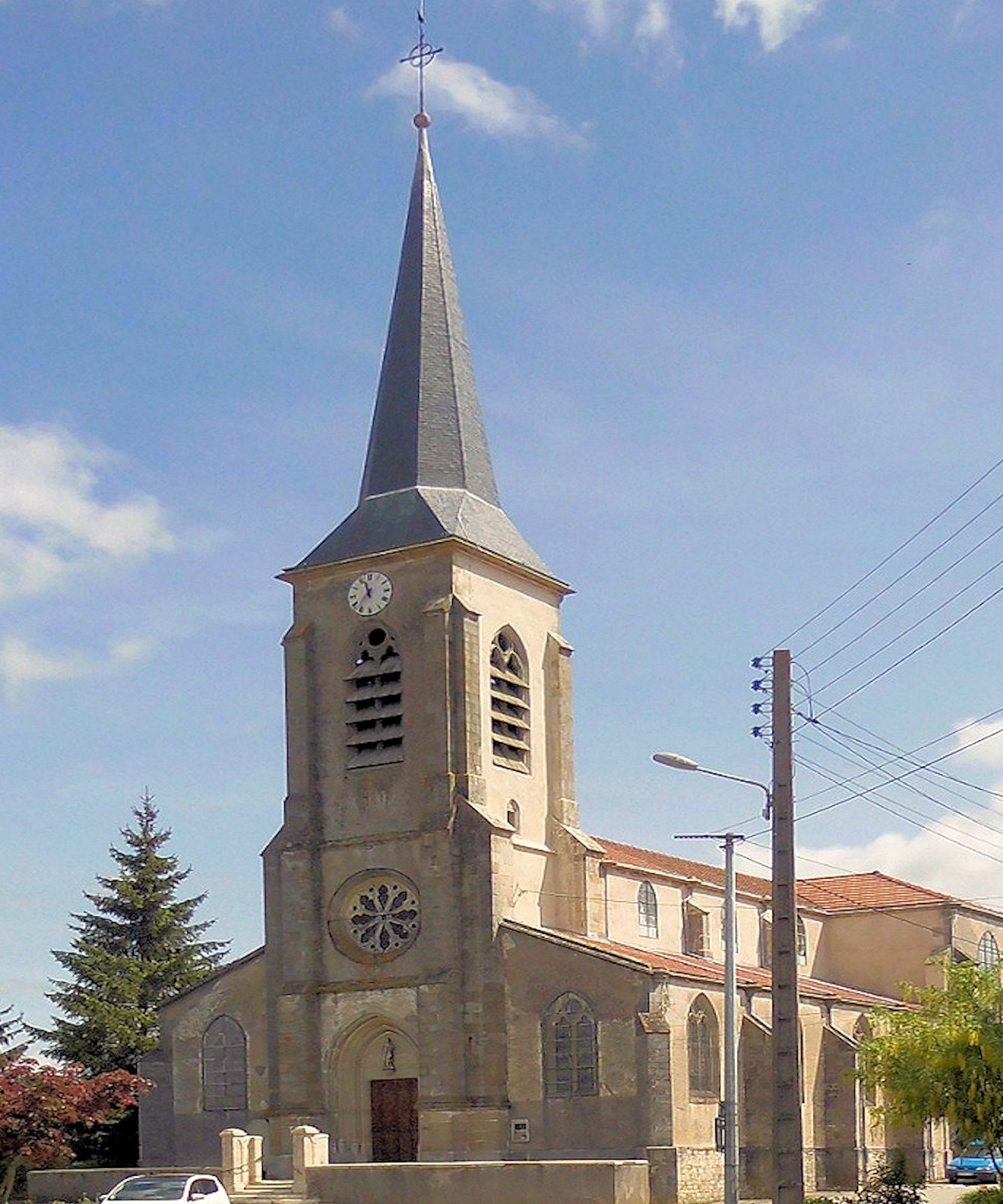
- The church in Saint-Firmin

- Coat of arms
- Location of Saint-Firmin
- Location within France Location within Grand Est
- Coordinates: 48°25′12″N 6°08′01″E
- Country: France
- Region: Grand Est
- Department: Meurthe-et-Moselle
- Arrondissement: Nancy
- Canton: Meine au Saintois
- Intercommunality: Pays du Saintois

Government
  - Mayor (2020–2026): Thierry Nicolas
- Area^{1}: 6.67 km^{2} (2.58 sq mi)
- Elevation: 310 m (1,020 ft)
- Highest elevation: 311 m (1,020 ft)
- Lowest elevation: 259 m (850 ft)
- Population (2023): 292
  - Density: 43.8/km^{2} (113/sq mi)
- Time zone: UTC+01:00 (CET)
  - Summer (DST): UTC+02:00 (CEST)
- INSEE/Postal code: 54473 /54930
- ^{1} French Land Register data, which excludes lakes, ponds, glaciers > 1 km^{2} (0.386 sq mi or 247 acres) and river estuaries.

Saint-Firmin (French pronunciation: [sɛ̃ fiʁmɛ̃]) is a commune in the Meurthe-et-Moselle department in north-eastern France.

== See also ==
- Communes of the Meurthe-et-Moselle department
