= Benney =

- Commune
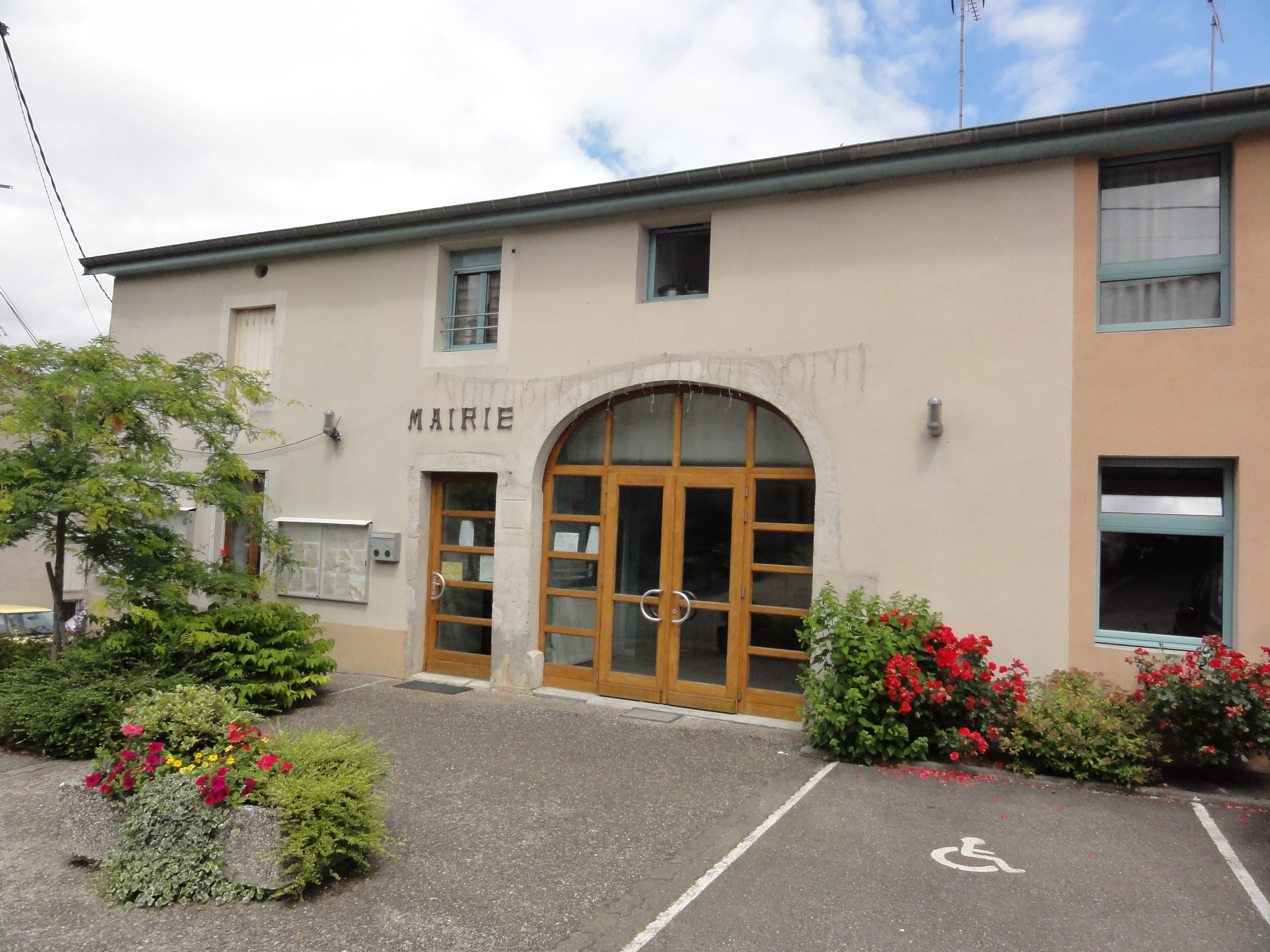
- The town hall in Benney

- Coat of arms
- Location of Benney
- Location within France Location within Grand Est
- Coordinates: 48°30′49″N 6°13′13″E
- Country: France
- Region: Grand Est
- Department: Meurthe-et-Moselle
- Arrondissement: Nancy
- Canton: Meine au Saintois
- Intercommunality: Pays du Saintois

Government
  - Mayor (2020–2026): Jean-Marc Boulanger
- Area^{1}: 18.48 km^{2} (7.14 sq mi)
- Elevation: 320 m (1,050 ft)
- Highest elevation: 374 m (1,227 ft)
- Lowest elevation: 230 m (750 ft)
- Population (2023): 637
  - Density: 34.5/km^{2} (89.3/sq mi)
- Time zone: UTC+01:00 (CET)
  - Summer (DST): UTC+02:00 (CEST)
- INSEE/Postal code: 54062 /54740
- ^{1} French Land Register data, which excludes lakes, ponds, glaciers > 1 km^{2} (0.386 sq mi or 247 acres) and river estuaries.

Benney (French pronunciation: [bɛne]) is a commune in the Meurthe-et-Moselle department in northeastern France.

== Population ==
Historical population
Year	Pop.	±% p.a.
1968	407	—
1975	376	−1.13%
1982	367	−0.35%
1990	465	+3.00%
1999	517	+1.18%
2007	598	+1.84%
2012	626	+0.92%
2017	650	+0.76%
2023	637	−0.34%
Source: INSEE

== See also ==
- Communes of the Meurthe-et-Moselle department
