= Crévéchamps =

- Commune
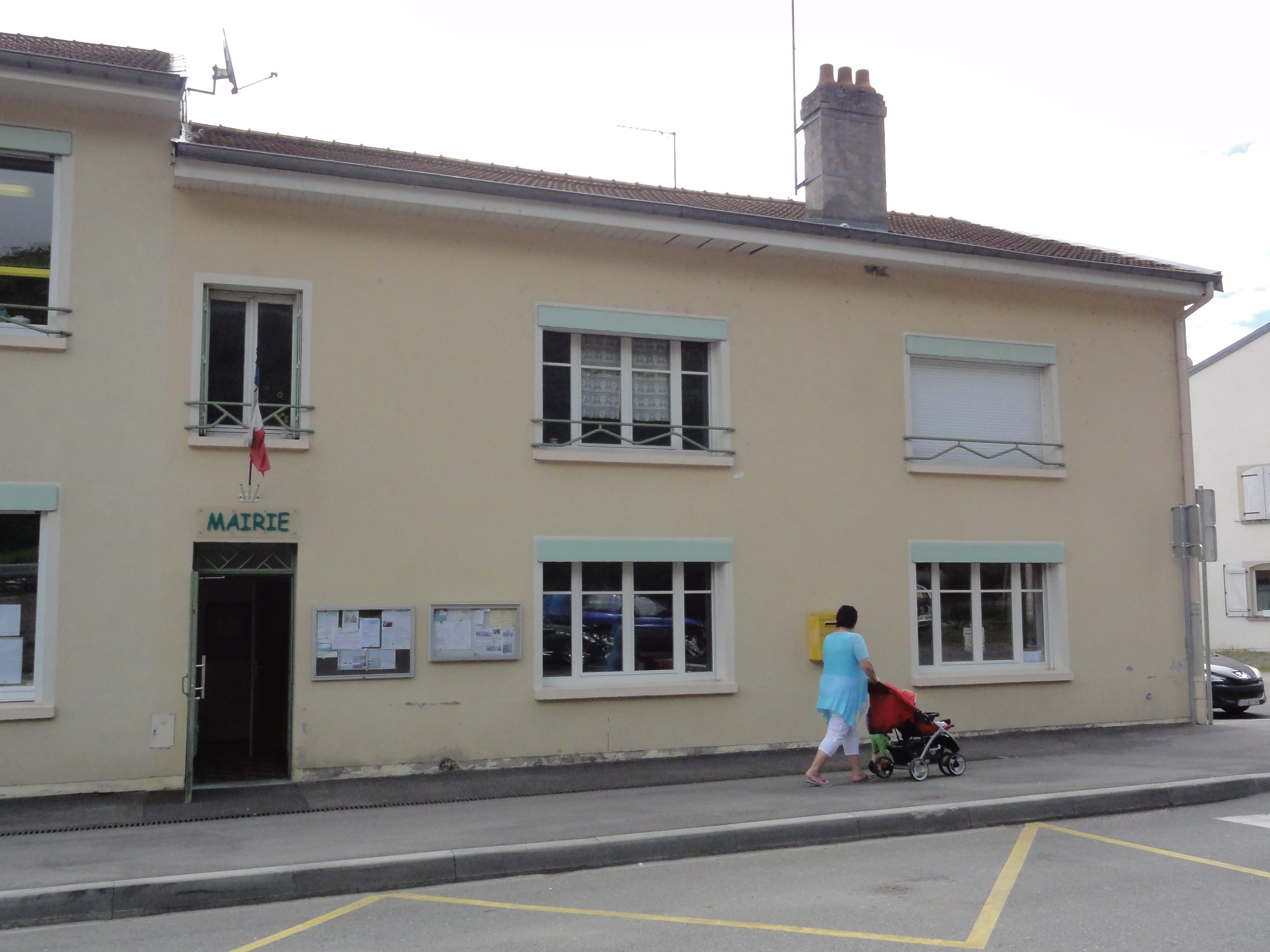
- The town hall in Crévéchamps

- Coat of arms
- Location of Crévéchamps
- Location within France Location within Grand Est
- Coordinates: 48°31′28″N 6°15′59″E
- Country: France
- Region: Grand Est
- Department: Meurthe-et-Moselle
- Arrondissement: Lunéville
- Canton: Meine au Saintois
- Intercommunality: CC Meurthe, Mortagne, Moselle

Government
  - Mayor (2020–2026): Sébastien Nicolas
- Area^{1}: 4.86 km^{2} (1.88 sq mi)
- Elevation: 240 m (790 ft)
- Highest elevation: 337 m (1,106 ft)
- Lowest elevation: 235 m (771 ft)
- Population (2023): 341
  - Density: 70.2/km^{2} (182/sq mi)
- Time zone: UTC+01:00 (CET)
  - Summer (DST): UTC+02:00 (CEST)
- INSEE/Postal code: 54144 /54290
- ^{1} French Land Register data, which excludes lakes, ponds, glaciers > 1 km^{2} (0.386 sq mi or 247 acres) and river estuaries.

Crévéchamps (French pronunciation: [kʁeveʃɑ̃]) is a commune in the Meurthe-et-Moselle department in north-eastern France.

== See also ==
- Communes of the Meurthe-et-Moselle department
