= Mangonville =

- Commune
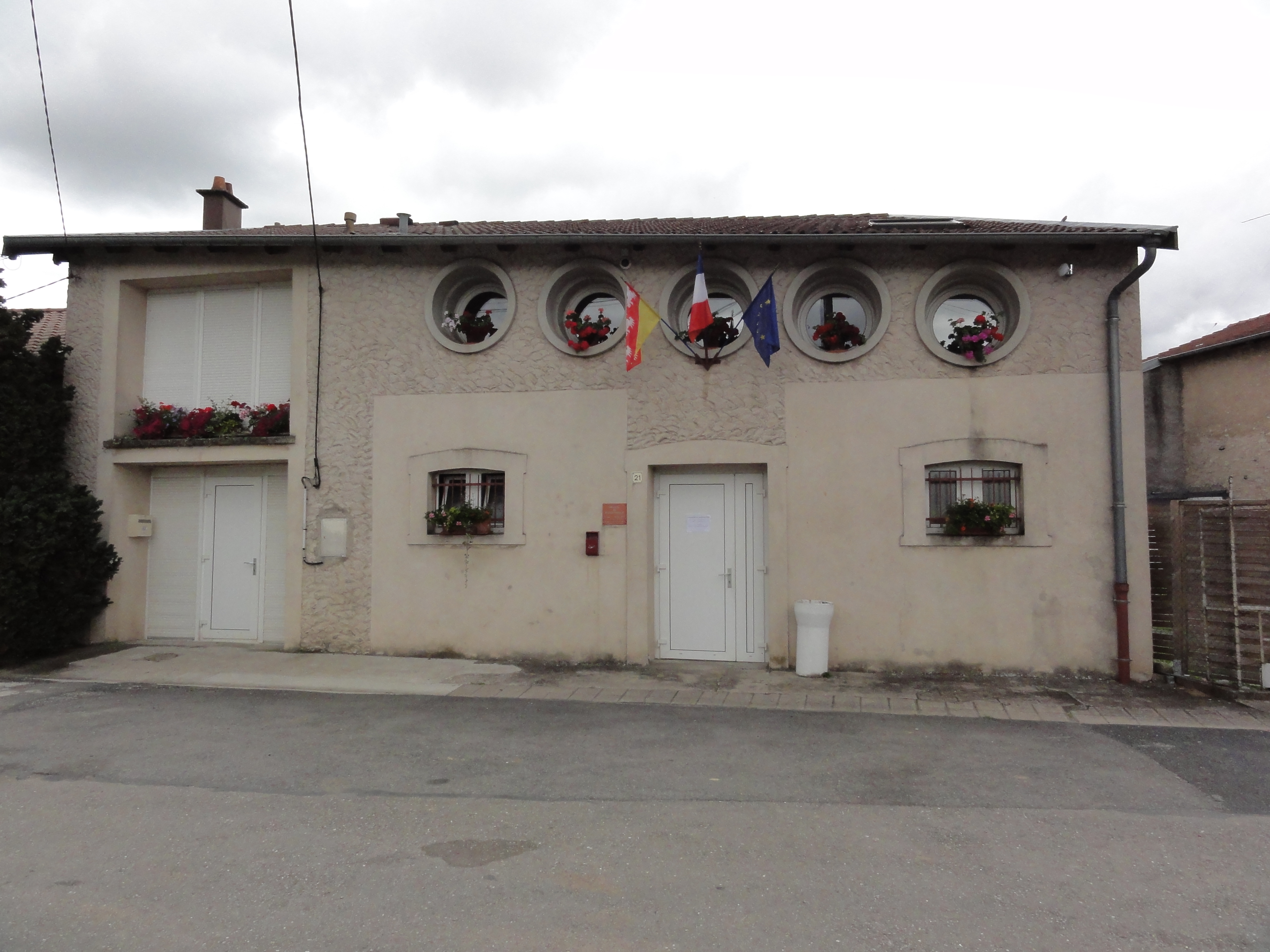
- The town hall in Mangonville

- Coat of arms
- Location of Mangonville
- Location within France Location within Grand Est
- Coordinates: 48°27′25″N 6°17′23″E
- Country: France
- Region: Grand Est
- Department: Meurthe-et-Moselle
- Arrondissement: Nancy
- Canton: Meine au Saintois
- Intercommunality: Pays du Saintois

Government
  - Mayor (2020–2026): Dominique Claude
- Area^{1}: 3.85 km^{2} (1.49 sq mi)
- Elevation: 250 m (820 ft)
- Highest elevation: 365 m (1,198 ft)
- Lowest elevation: 247 m (810 ft)
- Population (2023): 208
  - Density: 54.0/km^{2} (140/sq mi)
- Time zone: UTC+01:00 (CET)
  - Summer (DST): UTC+02:00 (CEST)
- INSEE/Postal code: 54344 /54290
- ^{1} French Land Register data, which excludes lakes, ponds, glaciers > 1 km^{2} (0.386 sq mi or 247 acres) and river estuaries.

Mangonville (French pronunciation: [mɑ̃ɡɔ̃vil]) is a commune in the Meurthe-et-Moselle department in north-eastern France.

== See also ==
- Communes of the Meurthe-et-Moselle department
