= Crantenoy =

- Commune
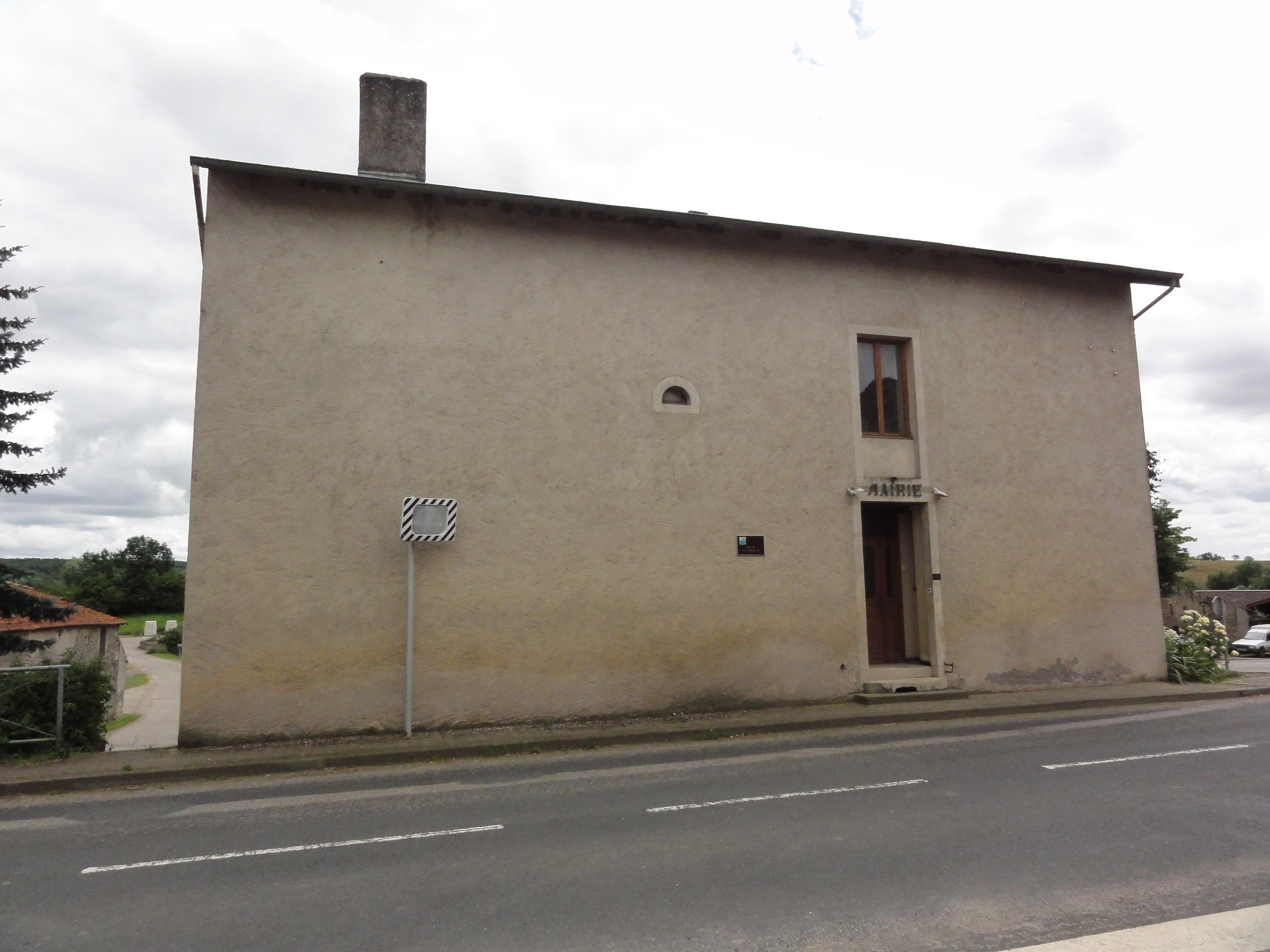
- The town hall in Crantenoy

- Coat of arms
- Location of Crantenoy
- Location within France Location within Grand Est
- Coordinates: 48°28′05″N 6°13′39″E
- Country: France
- Region: Grand Est
- Department: Meurthe-et-Moselle
- Arrondissement: Nancy
- Canton: Meine au Saintois
- Intercommunality: CC Pays du Saintois

Government
  - Mayor (2020–2026): Alain Weber
- Area^{1}: 5.28 km^{2} (2.04 sq mi)
- Elevation: 305 m (1,001 ft)
- Highest elevation: 340 m (1,120 ft)
- Lowest elevation: 275 m (902 ft)
- Population (2023): 147
  - Density: 27.8/km^{2} (72.1/sq mi)
- Time zone: UTC+01:00 (CET)
  - Summer (DST): UTC+02:00 (CEST)
- INSEE/Postal code: 54142 /54740
- ^{1} French Land Register data, which excludes lakes, ponds, glaciers > 1 km^{2} (0.386 sq mi or 247 acres) and river estuaries.

Crantenoy (French pronunciation: [kʁɑ̃tnwa]) is a commune in the Meurthe-et-Moselle department in north-eastern France.

== See also ==
- Communes of the Meurthe-et-Moselle department
