= Bouzanville =

- Commune
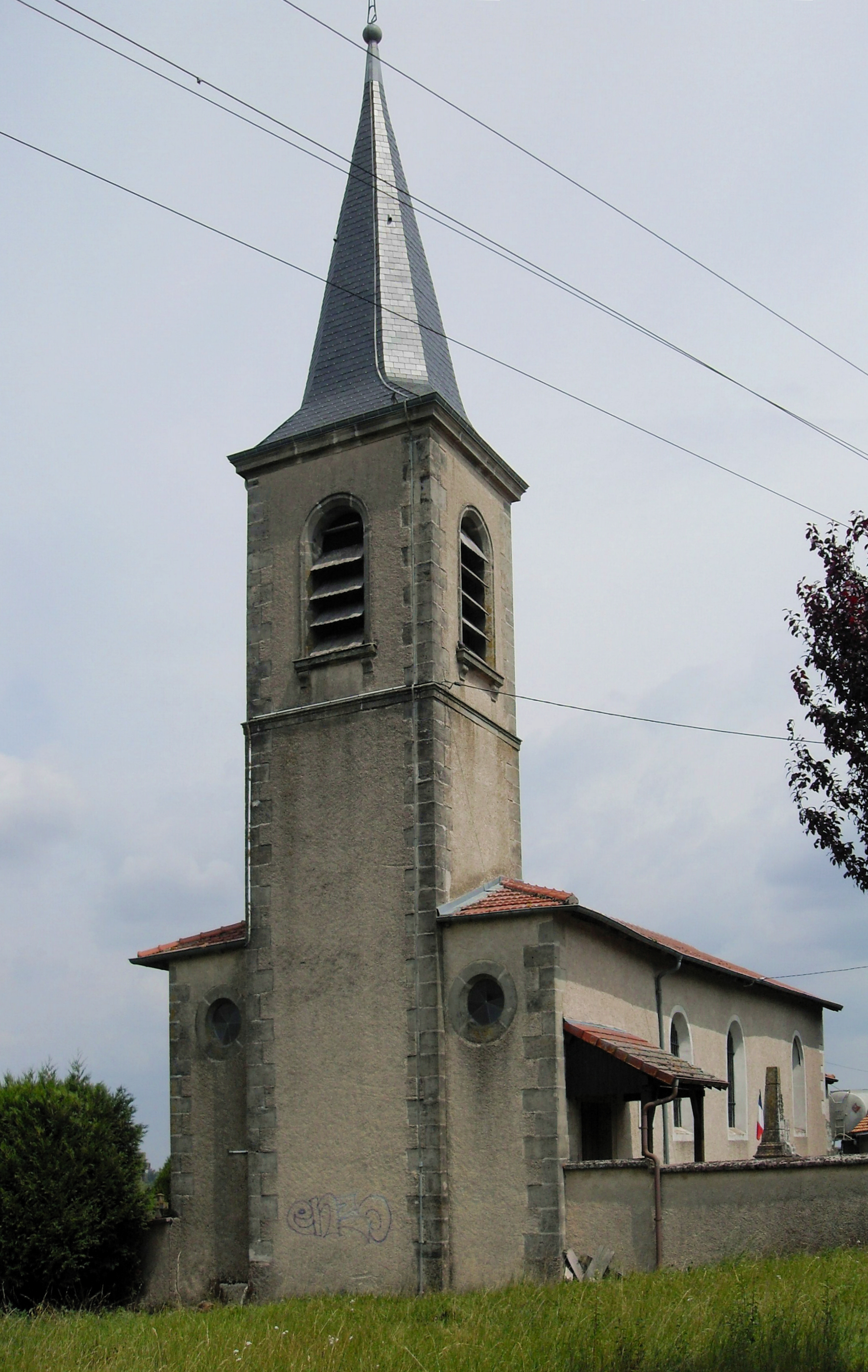
- The church in Bouzanville

- Coat of arms
- Location of Bouzanville
- Location within France Location within Grand Est
- Coordinates: 48°22′29″N 6°06′09″E
- Country: France
- Region: Grand Est
- Department: Meurthe-et-Moselle
- Arrondissement: Nancy
- Canton: Meine au Saintois

Government
  - Mayor (2020–2026): Nicole Bellot
- Area^{1}: 5.82 km^{2} (2.25 sq mi)
- Elevation: 315 m (1,033 ft)
- Highest elevation: 326 m (1,070 ft)
- Lowest elevation: 284 m (932 ft)
- Population (2023): 64
  - Density: 11/km^{2} (28/sq mi)
- Time zone: UTC+01:00 (CET)
  - Summer (DST): UTC+02:00 (CEST)
- INSEE/Postal code: 54092 /54930
- ^{1} French Land Register data, which excludes lakes, ponds, glaciers > 1 km^{2} (0.386 sq mi or 247 acres) and river estuaries.

Bouzanville (French pronunciation: [buzɑ̃vil]) is a commune in the Meurthe-et-Moselle department in northeastern France.

== Population ==
Historical population
Year	Pop.	±% p.a.
1968	77	—
1975	80	+0.55%
1982	65	−2.92%
1990	66	+0.19%
1999	65	−0.17%
2007	65	+0.00%
2012	61	−1.26%
2017	62	+0.33%
2023	64	+0.53%
Source: INSEE

== See also ==
- Communes of the Meurthe-et-Moselle department
