= Parey-Saint-Césaire =

- Commune
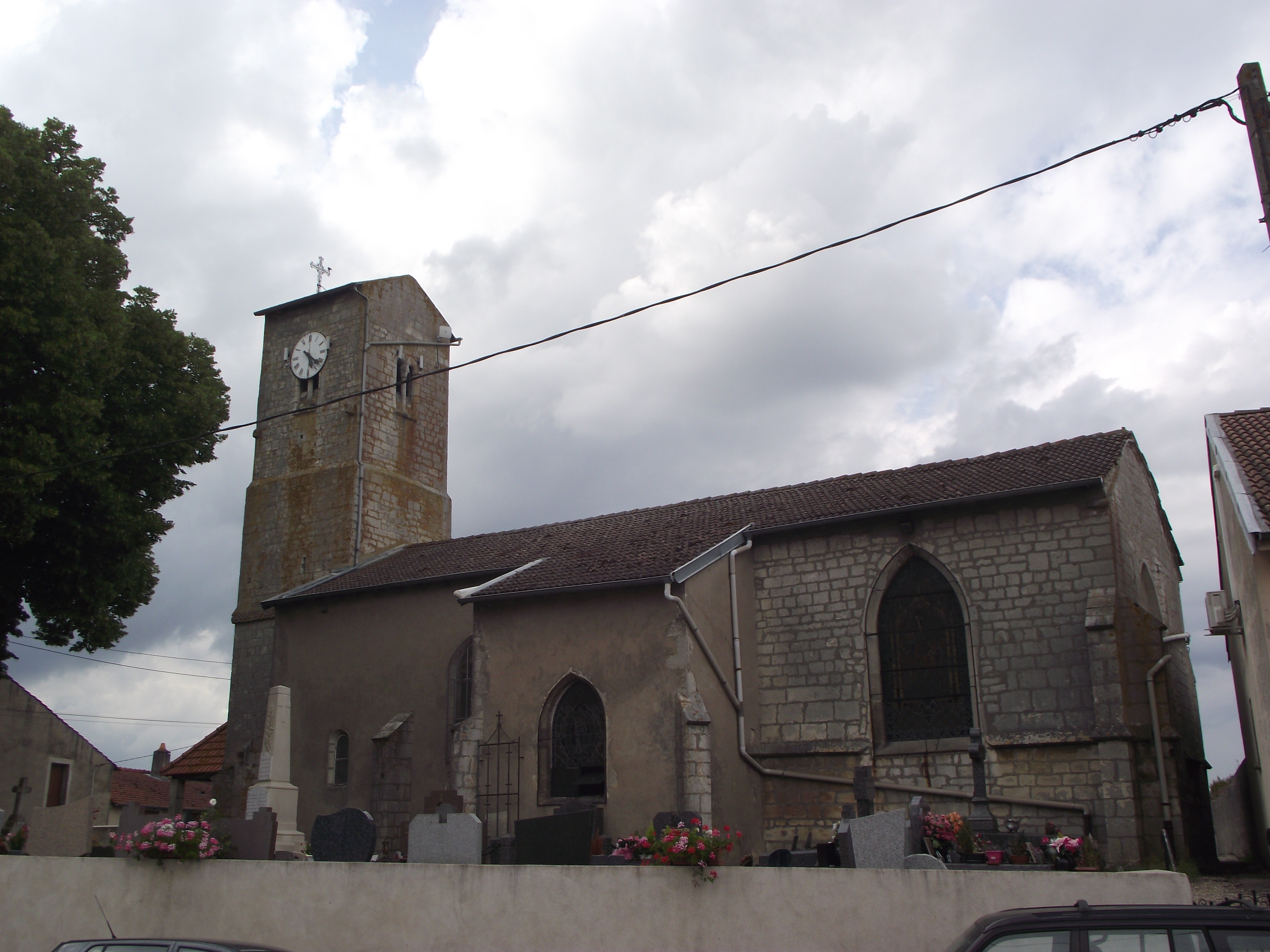
- The church in Parey-Saint-Césaire

- Coat of arms
- Location of Parey-Saint-Césaire
- Location within France Location within Grand Est
- Coordinates: 48°31′55″N 6°04′05″E
- Country: France
- Region: Grand Est
- Department: Meurthe-et-Moselle
- Arrondissement: Nancy
- Canton: Meine au Saintois
- Intercommunality: CC Pays du Saintois

Government
  - Mayor (2020–2026): Jacques Mangin
- Area^{1}: 5.67 km^{2} (2.19 sq mi)
- Elevation: 280 m (920 ft)
- Highest elevation: 298 m (978 ft)
- Lowest elevation: 249 m (817 ft)
- Population (2023): 248
  - Density: 43.7/km^{2} (113/sq mi)
- Time zone: UTC+01:00 (CET)
  - Summer (DST): UTC+02:00 (CEST)
- INSEE/Postal code: 54417 /54330
- ^{1} French Land Register data, which excludes lakes, ponds, glaciers > 1 km^{2} (0.386 sq mi or 247 acres) and river estuaries.

Parey-Saint-Césaire (French pronunciation: [paʁɛ sɛ̃ sezɛʁ]) is a commune in the Meurthe-et-Moselle department in north-eastern France.

== See also ==
- Communes of the Meurthe-et-Moselle department
