= Saint-Remimont, Meurthe-et-Moselle =

Saint-Remimont
- Commune
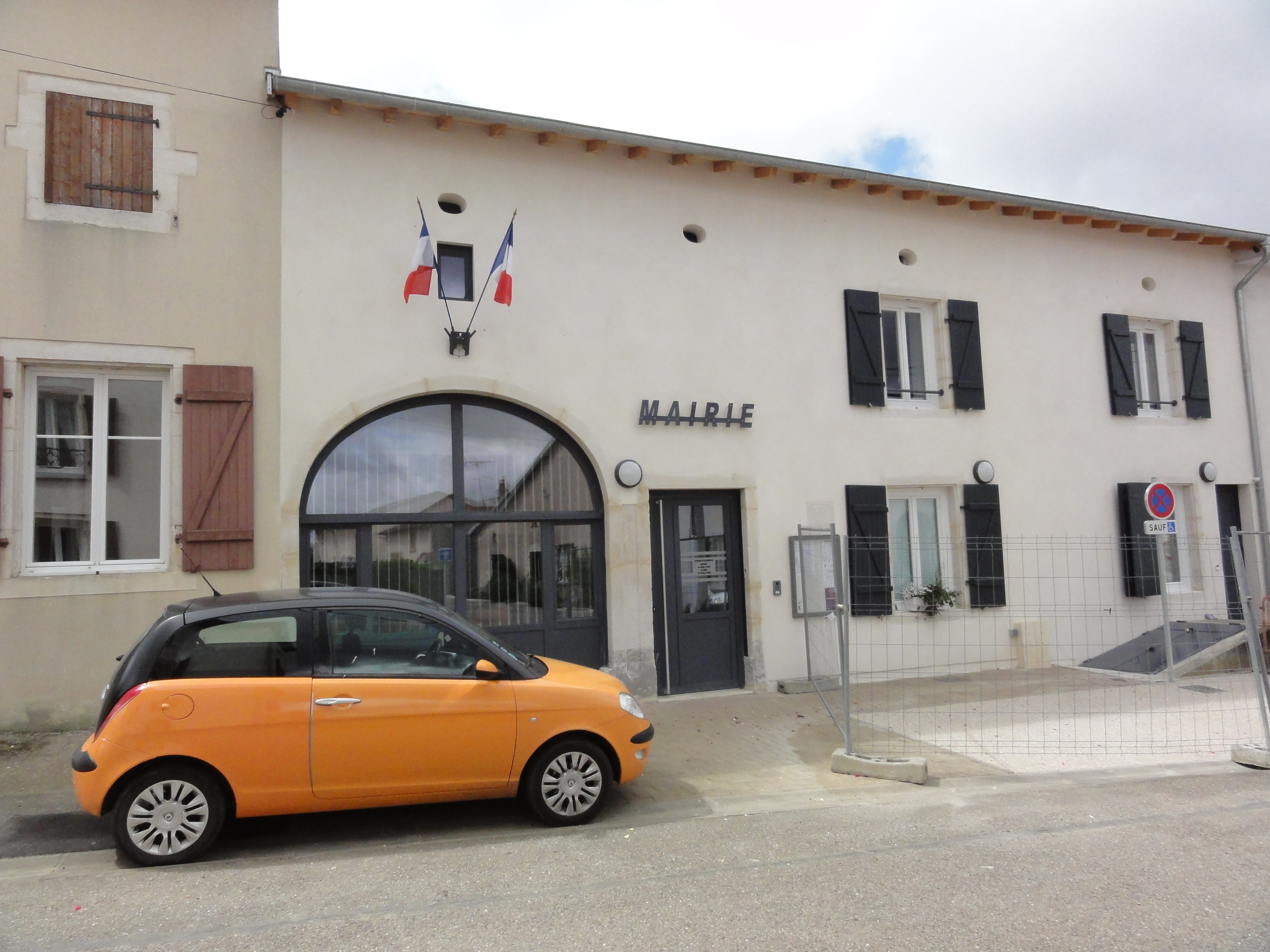
- The town hall in Saint-Remimont

- Coat of arms
- Location of Saint-Remimont
- Location within France Location within Grand Est
- Coordinates: 48°29′56″N 6°15′02″E
- Country: France
- Region: Grand Est
- Department: Meurthe-et-Moselle
- Arrondissement: Nancy
- Canton: Meine au Saintois
- Intercommunality: Pays du Saintois

Government
  - Mayor (2020–2026): Viviane Damien
- Area^{1}: 6.79 km^{2} (2.62 sq mi)
- Elevation: 346 m (1,135 ft)
- Highest elevation: 350 m (1,150 ft)
- Lowest elevation: 238 m (781 ft)
- Population (2023): 324
  - Density: 47.7/km^{2} (124/sq mi)
- Time zone: UTC+01:00 (CET)
  - Summer (DST): UTC+02:00 (CEST)
- INSEE/Postal code: 54486 /54740
- ^{1} French Land Register data, which excludes lakes, ponds, glaciers > 1 km^{2} (0.386 sq mi or 247 acres) and river estuaries.

Saint-Remimont (French pronunciation: [sɛ̃ ʁəmimɔ̃]) is a commune in the Meurthe-et-Moselle department in north-eastern France.

== Population ==
Historical population
Year	Pop.	±% p.a.
1968	146	—
1975	154	+0.76%
1982	281	+8.97%
1990	326	+1.87%
1999	338	+0.40%
2007	333	−0.19%
2012	337	+0.24%
2017	354	+0.99%
2023	324	−1.47%
Source: INSEE

== See also ==
- Communes of the Meurthe-et-Moselle department
