= Canton of Tomblaine =

Former canton in Meurthe-et-Moselle, France

Coordinates: 48°41′06″N 6°12′02″E

- Former canton
- Location of the canton in the arrondissement of Nancy
- Country: France
- Region: Grand Est
- Department: Meurthe-et-Moselle
- No. of communes: {{{nbcomm}}}
- Disbanded: 2015

Government
  - Representatives: Jean-Pierre Laurency
- Area: 109.56 km^{2} (42.30 sq mi)
- Population (2012): 24,089
  - Density: 219.87/km^{2} (569.46/sq mi)

The canton of Tomblaine (French: Canton de Tomblaine) is a former French canton located in the department of Meurthe-et-Moselle in the Lorraine region (now part of Grand Est). It was created on January 26, 1982, from 11 communes of the canton of Saint-Nicolas-de-Port. It is now part of the canton of Saint-Max.

The last general councillor from this canton was Jean-Pierre Laurency (PS), elected in 2011.

== Composition ==
The canton of Tomblaine grouped together 12 municipalities and had 24,089 inhabitants (2012 census without double counts).

1. Art-sur-Meurthe
2. Buissoncourt
3. Cerville
4. Erbéviller-sur-Amezule
5. Fléville-devant-Nancy
6. Gellenoncourt
7. Haraucourt
8. Laneuveville-devant-Nancy
9. Lenoncourt
10. Réméréville
11. Tomblaine
12. Varangéville
