= Canton of Seichamps =

Former canton in Meurthe-et-Moselle, France

Coordinates: 48°42′57″N 6°15′01″E

- Former canton
- Location of the canton in the arrondissement of Nancy
- Country: France
- Region: Grand Est
- Department: Meurthe-et-Moselle
- No. of communes: {{{nbcomm}}}
- Disbanded: 2015

Government
  - Representatives: Henri Chanut
- Area: 69.70 km^{2} (26.91 sq mi)
- Population (2012): 16,171
  - Density: 232.0/km^{2} (600.9/sq mi)

The canton of Seichamps (French: Canton de Seichamps) is a former French canton located in the department of Meurthe-et-Moselle in the Lorraine region (now part of Grand Est). It was created on February 21, 1997, by division of the canton of Saint-Max. It is now part of the canton of Grand Couronné.

The last general councillor from this canton was Henri Chanut (PS), elected in 2011.

== Composition ==
The canton of Seichamps grouped together 9 municipalities and had 16,171 inhabitants (2012 census without double counts).

1. Champenoux
2. Laneuvelotte
3. Mazerulles
4. Moncel-sur-Seille
5. Pulnoy
6. Saulxures-lès-Nancy
7. Seichamps
8. Sornéville
9. Velaine-sous-Amance
