= Canton of Malzéville =

Former canton in Meurthe-et-Moselle, France

Coordinates: 48°43′21″N 6°09′05″E

- Former canton
- Location of the canton in the arrondissement of Nancy
- Country: France
- Region: Grand Est
- Department: Meurthe-et-Moselle
- No. of communes: {{{nbcomm}}}
- Disbanded: 2015

Government
  - Representatives: Jean-Paul Bolmont
- Area: 101.33 km^{2} (39.12 sq mi)
- Population (2012): 22,112
  - Density: 218.22/km^{2} (565.18/sq mi)

The canton of Malzéville (French: Canton de Malzéville) is a former French canton located in the department of Meurthe-et-Moselle in the Lorraine region (now part of Grand Est). This canton was organized around Malzéville in the arrondissement of Nancy.

The last general councillor from this canton was Jean-Paul Bolmont (PS), elected in 1997.

== Composition ==
The canton of Malzéville grouped together 11 municipalities and had 22,112 inhabitants (2012 census without double counts).

1. Agincourt
2. Amance
3. Bouxières-aux-Chênes
4. Bouxières-aux-Dames
5. Brin-sur-Seille
6. Custines
7. Dommartin-sous-Amance
8. Eulmont
9. Laître-sous-Amance
10. Lay-Saint-Christophe
11. Malzéville
