= Arrondissement of Nancy =

Coordinates: 48°41′30″N 6°11′00″E

Nancy
- Arrondissement
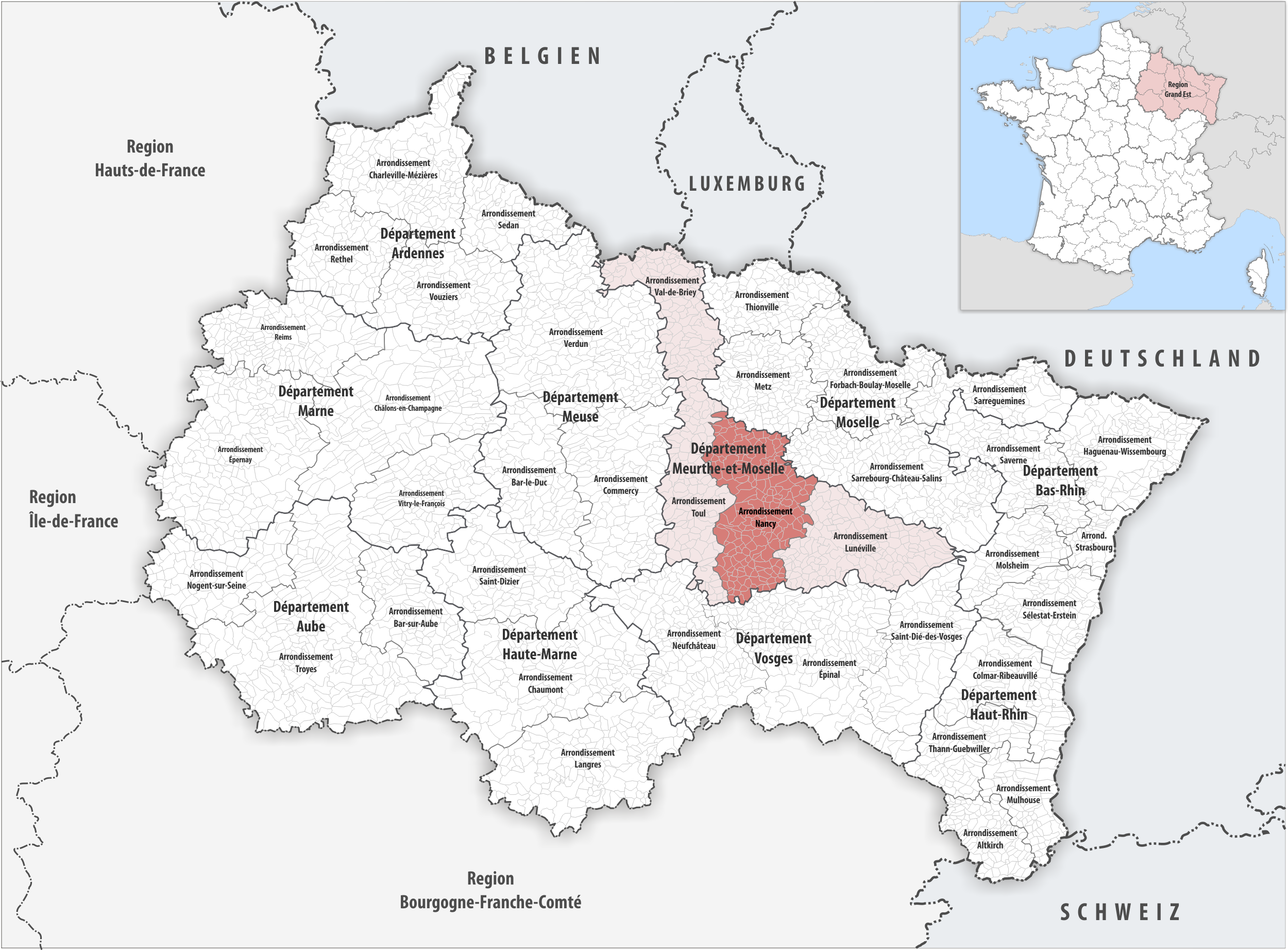
- Location within the region Grand Est
- Country: France
- Region: Grand Est
- Department: Meurthe-et-Moselle
- No. of communes: {{{nbcomm}}}
- Area: 1,583.9 km^{2} (611.5 sq mi)
- Population (2023): 426,443
  - Density: 269.24/km^{2} (697.32/sq mi)
- INSEE code: 543

The arrondissement of Nancy is an arrondissement of France in the Meurthe-et-Moselle department in the Grand Est region. It has 196 communes. Its population is 427,697 (2021), and its area is 1,583.9 km^{2} (611.5 sq mi).

== Composition ==
The communes of the arrondissement of Nancy, and their INSEE codes, are:

1. Abaucourt (54001)
2. Affracourt (54005)
3. Agincourt (54006)
4. Amance (54012)
5. Armaucourt (54021)
6. Arraye-et-Han (54024)
7. Art-sur-Meurthe (54025)
8. Atton (54027)
9. Autreville-sur-Moselle (54031)
10. Autrey (54032)
11. Azelot (54037)
12. Bainville-aux-Miroirs (54042)
13. Bainville-sur-Madon (54043)
14. Belleau (54059)
15. Belleville (54060)
16. Benney (54062)
17. Bey-sur-Seille (54070)
18. Bezaumont (54072)
19. Blénod-lès-Pont-à-Mousson (54079)
20. Bouxières-aux-Chênes (54089)
21. Bouxières-aux-Dames (54090)
22. Bouxières-sous-Froidmont (54091)
23. Bouzanville (54092)
24. Bralleville (54094)
25. Bratte (54095)
26. Brin-sur-Seille (54100)
27. Buissoncourt (54104)
28. Burthecourt-aux-Chênes (54108)
29. Ceintrey (54109)
30. Cerville (54110)
31. Chaligny (54111)
32. Champenoux (54113)
33. Champey-sur-Moselle (54114)
34. Champigneulles (54115)
35. Chaouilley (54117)
36. Chavigny (54123)
37. Chenicourt (54126)
38. Clémery (54131)
39. Clérey-sur-Brenon (54132)
40. Coyviller (54141)
41. Crantenoy (54142)
42. Crévic (54145)
43. Custines (54150)
44. Diarville (54156)
45. Dieulouard (54157)
46. Dombasle-sur-Meurthe (54159)
47. Dommarie-Eulmont (54164)
48. Dommartemont (54165)
49. Dommartin-sous-Amance (54168)
50. Éply (54179)
51. Erbéviller-sur-Amezule (54180)
52. Essey-lès-Nancy (54184)
53. Étreval (54185)
54. Eulmont (54186)
55. Faulx (54188)
56. Ferrières (54192)
57. Flavigny-sur-Moselle (54196)
58. Fléville-devant-Nancy (54197)
59. Forcelles-Saint-Gorgon (54203)
60. Forcelles-sous-Gugney (54204)
61. Fraisnes-en-Saintois (54207)
62. Frolois (54214)
63. Frouard (54215)
64. Gellenoncourt (54219)
65. Gerbécourt-et-Haplemont (54221)
66. Germonville (54224)
67. Gézoncourt (54225)
68. Goviller (54235)
69. Gripport (54238)
70. Griscourt (54239)
71. Gugney (54241)
72. Hammeville (54247)
73. Haraucourt (54250)
74. Haroué (54252)
75. Heillecourt (54257)
76. Houdelmont (54264)
77. Houdemont (54265)
78. Houdreville (54266)
79. Housséville (54268)
80. Hudiviller (54269)
81. Jarville-la-Malgrange (54274)
82. Jeandelaincourt (54276)
83. Jevoncourt (54278)
84. Jezainville (54279)
85. Laître-sous-Amance (54289)
86. Lalœuf (54291)
87. Landremont (54294)
88. Laneuvelotte (54296)
89. Laneuveville-devant-Bayon (54299)
90. Laneuveville-devant-Nancy (54300)
91. Lanfroicourt (54301)
92. Laxou (54304)
93. Lay-Saint-Christophe (54305)
94. Lebeuville (54307)
95. Lemainville (54309)
96. Leménil-Mitry (54310)
97. Lenoncourt (54311)
98. Lesménils (54312)
99. Létricourt (54313)
100. Leyr (54315)
101. Liverdun (54318)
102. Loisy (54320)
103. Ludres (54328)
104. Lupcourt (54330)
105. Maidières (54332)
106. Mailly-sur-Seille (54333)
107. Maizières (54336)
108. Malleloy (54338)
109. Malzéville (54339)
110. Mangonville (54344)
111. Manoncourt-en-Vermois (54345)
112. Marbache (54351)
113. Maron (54352)
114. Marthemont (54354)
115. Martincourt (54355)
116. Maxéville (54357)
117. Mazerulles (54358)
118. Méréville (54364)
119. Messein (54366)
120. Millery (54369)
121. Moivrons (54372)
122. Moncel-sur-Seille (54374)
123. Montauville (54375)
124. Montenoy (54376)
125. Morville-sur-Seille (54387)
126. Mousson (54390)
127. Nancy (54395)
128. Neuves-Maisons (54397)
129. Neuviller-sur-Moselle (54399)
130. Nomeny (54400)
131. Norroy-lès-Pont-à-Mousson (54403)
132. Ognéville (54407)
133. Omelmont (54409)
134. Ormes-et-Ville (54411)
135. Pagny-sur-Moselle (54415)
136. Parey-Saint-Césaire (54417)
137. Phlin (54424)
138. Pierreville (54429)
139. Pompey (54430)
140. Pont-à-Mousson (54431)
141. Pont-Saint-Vincent (54432)
142. Port-sur-Seille (54433)
143. Praye (54434)
144. Pulligny (54437)
145. Pulnoy (54439)
146. Quevilloncourt (54442)
147. Raucourt (54444)
148. Réméréville (54456)
149. Richardménil (54459)
150. Rogéville (54460)
151. Rosières-aux-Salines (54462)
152. Rosières-en-Haye (54463)
153. Rouves (54464)
154. Roville-devant-Bayon (54465)
155. Saffais (54468)
156. Sainte-Geneviève (54474)
157. Saint-Firmin (54473)
158. Saint-Max (54482)
159. Saint-Nicolas-de-Port (54483)
160. Saint-Remimont (54486)
161. Saizerais (54490)
162. Saulxures-lès-Nancy (54495)
163. Saxon-Sion (54497)
164. Seichamps (54498)
165. Sexey-aux-Forges (54505)
166. Sivry (54508)
167. Sommerviller (54509)
168. Sornéville (54510)
169. Tantonville (54513)
170. Thélod (54515)
171. They-sous-Vaudemont (54516)
172. Thézey-Saint-Martin (54517)
173. Thorey-Lyautey (54522)
174. Tomblaine (54526)
175. Tonnoy (54527)
176. Vandières (54546)
177. Vandœuvre-lès-Nancy (54547)
178. Varangéville (54549)
179. Vaudémont (54552)
180. Vaudeville (54553)
181. Vaudigny (54554)
182. Velaine-sous-Amance (54558)
183. Vézelise (54563)
184. Ville-au-Val (54569)
185. Ville-en-Vermois (54571)
186. Villers-en-Haye (54573)
187. Villers-lès-Moivrons (54577)
188. Villers-lès-Nancy (54578)
189. Villers-sous-Prény (54579)
190. Viterne (54586)
191. Vitrey (54587)
192. Vittonville (54589)
193. Voinémont (54591)
194. Vroncourt (54592)
195. Xeuilley (54596)
196. Xirocourt (54597)

== History ==
The arrondissement of Nancy was created as part of the department Meurthe in 1800. Since 1871 it has been a part of the department Meurthe-et-Moselle. In January 2023, it gained eight communes from the arrondissement of Toul and three from the arrondissement of Lunéville, and it lost two communes to the arrondissement of Toul and one to the arrondissement of Lunéville.

As a result of the reorganisation of the cantons of France which came into effect in 2015, the borders of the cantons are no longer related to the borders of the arrondissements. The cantons of the arrondissement of Nancy were, as of January 2015:

1. Dieulouard
2. Haroué
3. Jarville-la-Malgrange
4. Laxou
5. Malzéville
6. Meine au Saintois
7. Nancy-Est
8. Nancy-Nord
9. Nancy-Ouest
10. Nancy-Sud
11. Neuves-Maisons
12. Nomeny
13. Pompey
14. Pont-à-Mousson
15. Saint-Max
16. Saint-Nicolas-de-Port
17. Seichamps
18. Tomblaine
19. Vandœuvre-lès-Nancy-Est
20. Vandœuvre-lès-Nancy-Ouest
