= Battle of the Trouée de Charmes =

1914 battle on the Western Front of World War I

- Part of The Battle of the Frontiers on the Western Front of the First World War
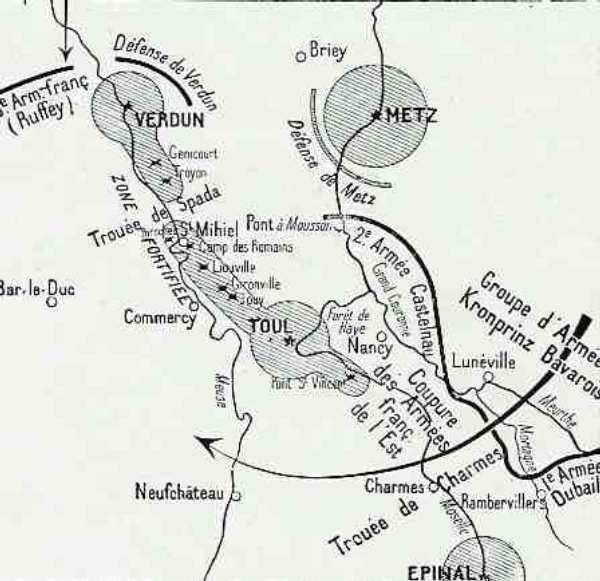
- German objective
Date	24–26 August 1914
Location	Between Lunéville and Charmes, Meurthe-et-Moselle, France 48°22′30″N 06°17′52″E
Result	French victory

Belligerents
France	German Empire

Commanders and leaders
Noël de Castelnau	Crown Prince Rupprecht

Strength
Second Army	6th Army

Casualties and losses
	c. 70,000
- Trouéede Charmes (Charmes Gap) in the Meurthe-et-Moselle, a department of the Grand Est region of France

The Battle of the Trouée de Charmes (French: Bataille de la trouée de Charmes) or Battle of the Mortagne was fought at the beginning of the First World War, between 24 and 26 August 1914 by the French Second Army and the German 6th Army, after the big German victory at the Battle of the Frontiers, earlier in August.

== Background ==
From 1874 to 1880, General Raymond Adolphe Séré de Rivières oversaw the construction of the Séré de Rivières system, a line of fortresses 40 mi (65 km) long from Belfort to Épinal and another line 40 mi (65 km) long from Toul to Verdun, about 25 mi (40 km) from the Franco–German border. The river Meuse flows northwards from Toul to Verdun, Mézières and Givet on the Belgian border and there is a tributary of the Moselle between Belfort and Épinal, the rivers running near parallel to the 1871–1919 Franco–German border. A 43 mi (70 km)-wide interruption in the French fortifications was left between Épinal and Toul, known as the Trouée de Charmes (Charmes Gap), which was west of Nancy, about 7.5 mi (12 km) from the Franco-German frontier. A second series of fortifications, to prevent the main line being outflanked, was built in the south from Langres to Dijon and in the north from La Fère to Rheims, then from Valenciennes to Maubeuge, although for financial reasons these took until 1914 to complete.

== Prelude ==
The French had suffered a crushing defeat in the Battle of Lorraine and retreated in disorder. Helmuth von Moltke the Younger, the Chief of the General Staff of the German army had a difficult choice. The apparent collapse of the French Second Army (General Noël de Castelnau) made possible a breakthrough at the Trouée de Charmes (Charmes Gap) and the encirclement of all French troops in Lorraine and the Ardennes.

Moltke decided to pursue the French and to break through the gap. He maintained the left wing at its full strength of 26 divisions and ordered the Bavarian 6th Army (General Rupprecht, Crown Prince of Bavaria) to attack at the junction of the French Second Army and the First Army (General Auguste Dubail).

The Second Army was regrouping in the Trouée de Charmes area and Castelnau learned from the Deuxième Bureau (military intelligence), that German columns were moving on Saffais and Bechamps, heading for the gap. A few hours later French aerial observers spotted the German troops and Joseph Joffre, the French Commander in Chief, directed Dubail to reinforce the Second Army with the VIII Corps.

== Battle ==
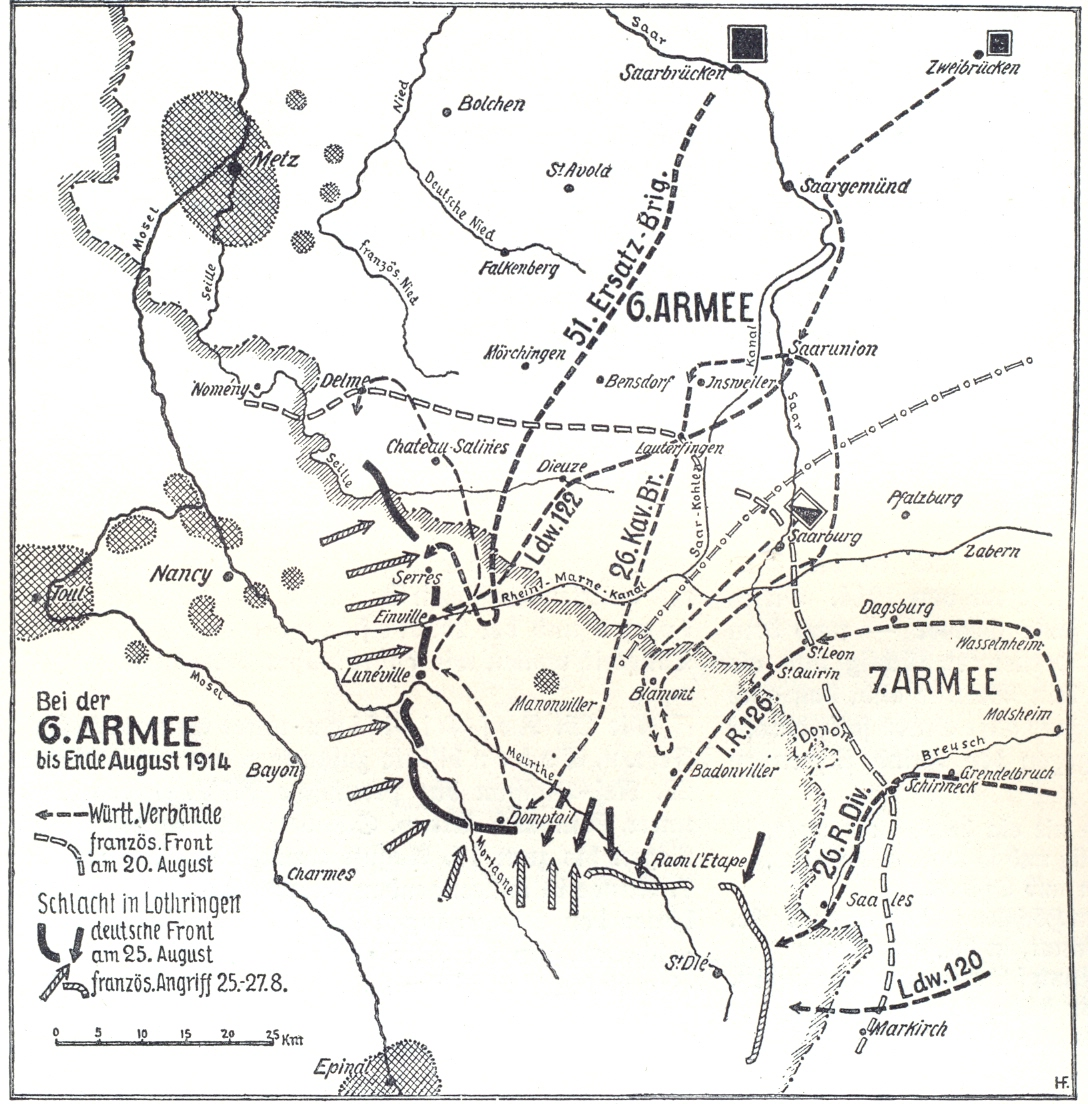
6th Army, August 1914

On 24 August, the Bavarian 6th Army began to attack in the direction of the Trouée de Charmes against the centre of the Second Army, as this was judged to be where the French were the strongest. The Germans captured Damelevières and Gerbéviller, then pushed the French from Vacquenat Wood, Clairlieu and Censal, from where they moved towards Bayon. The Second Army was able to limit the German advance, the French 74th Infantry Regiment in particular, fighting with great tenacity and Bavarian attacks on the Flainval plateau were repulsed. To force through the gap, the 6th Army moved troops to the centre from the flanks, which Castelnau exploited by attacking the German flanks with the 71st Division (General Émile Fayolle) and they were pushed out of Erbeviller, Réméréville and Courbesseaux. The right wing of the Second Army attacked the left flank of the Bavarians and managed to take Saint-Boingt, Essey-la-Côte, Clézentaine and Ménarmont.

During the night of 24/25 August, the French continued a bombardment and Castelnau concentrated the Second Army against the centre of the 6th Army. Castelnau launched an early morning attack to take Rozelieures; the attack succeeded but the Germans counter-attacked and retook the village. Castelnau attacked both German flanks with the XV Corps and XVI Corps. This had a devastating effect on the morale of the Bavarians, who had expected to be in pursuit of a defeated enemy. The Bavarian centre was kept under constant artillery fire by the French, and at 3:00 p.m., the French took Rozelieures again, the 6th Army suffering casualties of 2,500 men killed; on 26 August, Rupprecht ordered a retreat.

== Aftermath ==
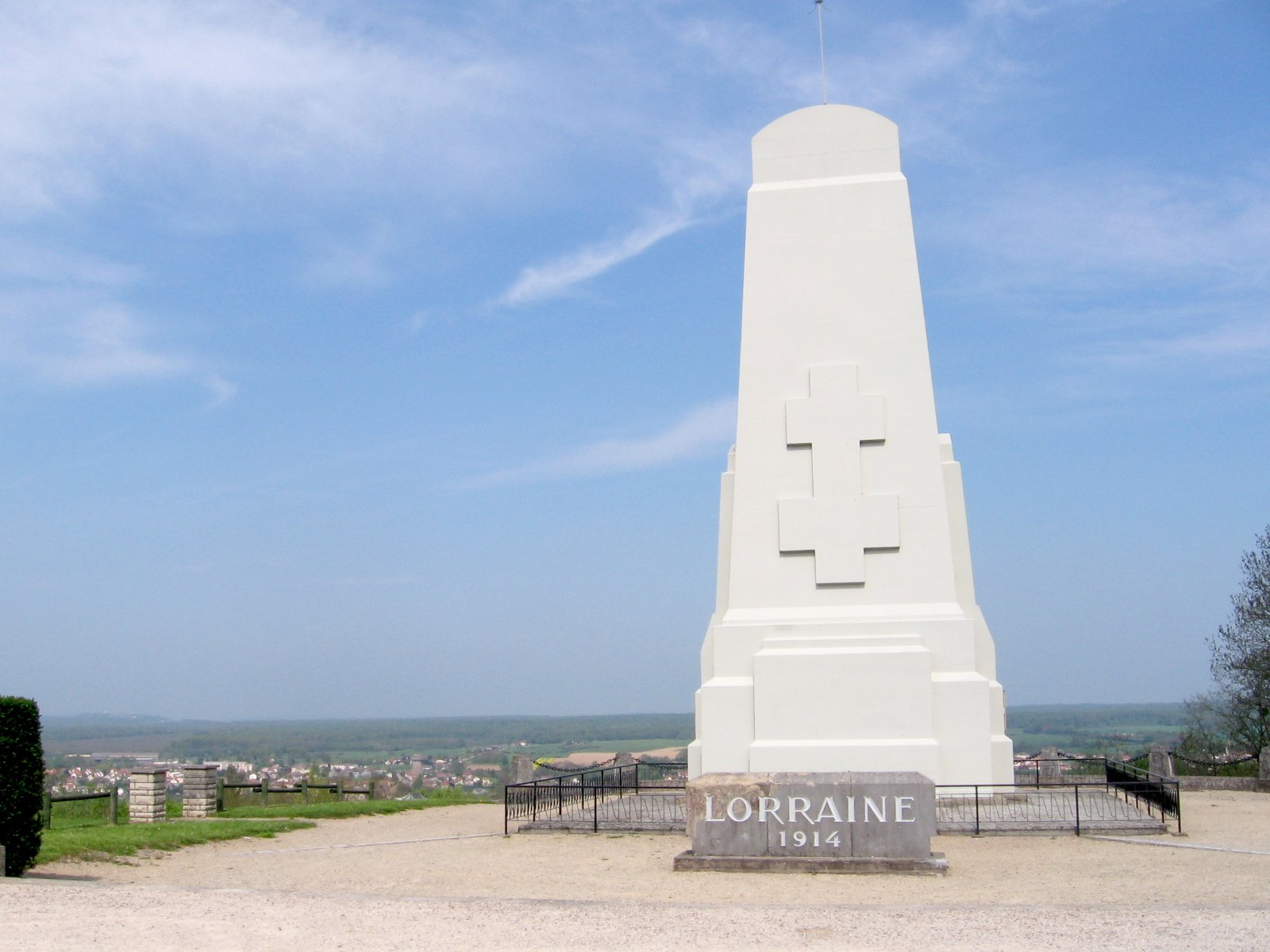
The Monument of Lorraine, which celebrates the outcome of the engagements of August–September 1914

The Battle of the Trouée de Charmes was a victory for the French Second Army; in stopping the Germans from passing through the gap, Castelnau possibly saved the French from disaster,

Paris a été sauvé à la Marne, c'est parce que Castelnau avait vaincu à Rozelieures (If Paris was saved at the Marne, it was because Castelnau had won at Rozelieures).

— Maurice Barrès

The two sides regrouped and on 4 September fought the Battle of Grand Couronné when the Germans tried to capture Nancy. The Bavarians had to abandon their effort on 13 September; the front line in Lorraine remained quiet for the next four years.

== Sources ==
- Doughty, R. A. (2005). Pyrrhic victory: French Strategy and Operations in the Great War. Cambridge, MA: Belknap Press. ISBN 978-0-674-01880-8.
