= Tomblaine =

- Commune
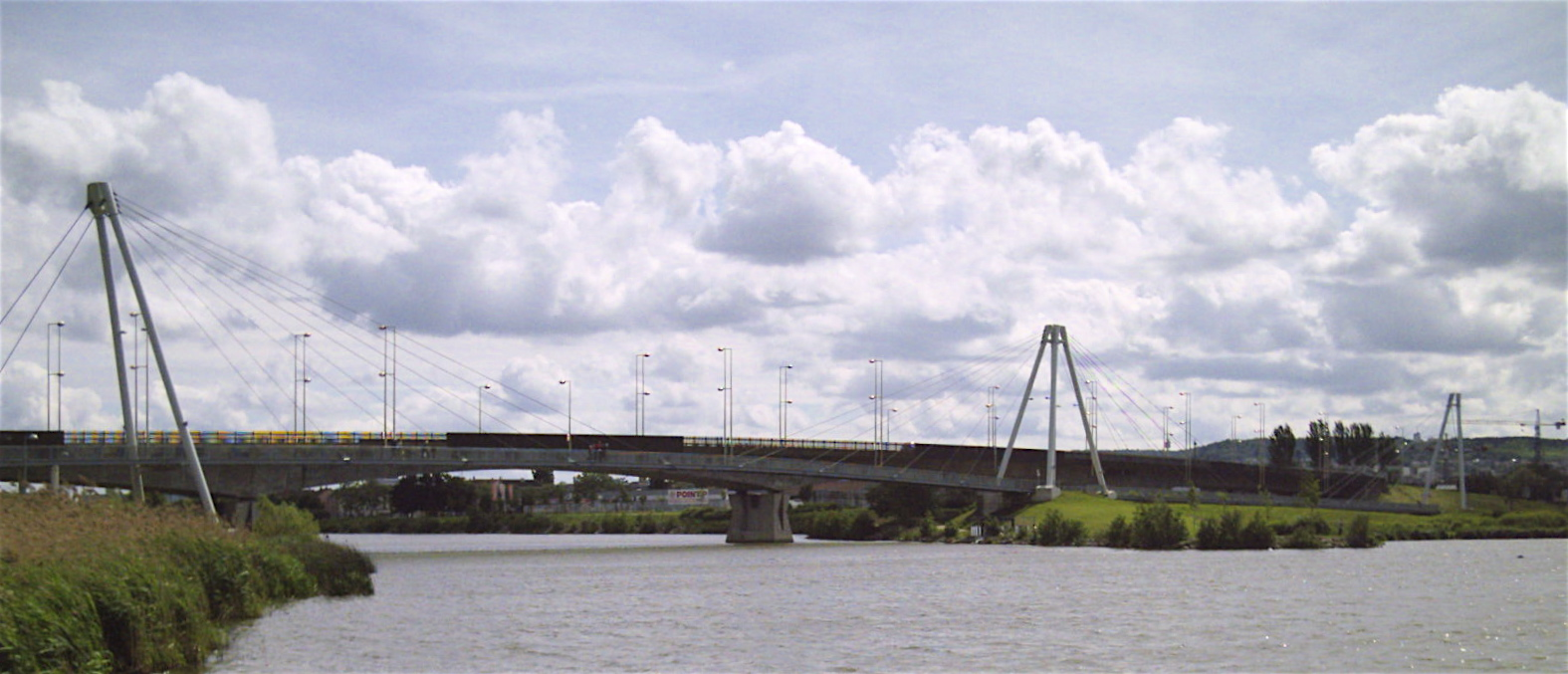
- The Concorde Bridge linking Tomblaine with Nancy

- Coat of arms
- Location of Tomblaine
- Location within France Location within Grand Est
- Coordinates: 48°41′1″N 6°13′17″E
- Country: France
- Region: Grand Est
- Department: Meurthe-et-Moselle
- Arrondissement: Nancy
- Canton: Saint-Max
- Intercommunality: Métropole du Grand Nancy

Government
  - Mayor (2024–2026): Hervé Féron
- Area^{1}: 5.55 km^{2} (2.14 sq mi)
- Elevation: 202 m (663 ft)
- Highest elevation: 241 m (791 ft)
- Lowest elevation: 193 m (633 ft)
- Population (2023): 9,117
  - Density: 1,640/km^{2} (4,250/sq mi)
- Time zone: UTC+01:00 (CET)
  - Summer (DST): UTC+02:00 (CEST)
- INSEE/Postal code: 54526 /54510
- ^{1} French Land Register data, which excludes lakes, ponds, glaciers > 1 km^{2} (0.386 sq mi or 247 acres) and river estuaries.

Tomblaine (French pronunciation: [tɔ̃blɛn]) is a commune in the Meurthe-et-Moselle department in north-eastern France. Stage 7 of the Tour de France on 7 July 2012 started in Tomblaine. The Stade Marcel Picot, football stadium to Ligue 1 side AS Nancy, is located within the area.

== Geography ==
Tomblaine is located north-east of France, in the eastern suburbs of Nancy. The town is separated from the city of Nancy by the river Meurthe. The two cities are connected by two main bridges. It is bordered to the north by the municipalities of Saint-Max and Essey-lès-Nancy to the south by Jarville-la-Malgrange, Laneuveville-devant-Nancy, Art-sur-Meurthe and Saulxures-lès-Nancy.

=== Climate ===
Climate data for Nancy-Tomblaine (Les Ensanges), elevation: 217 m or 712 ft, 1961-1990 normals and extremes
Month	Jan	Feb	Mar	Apr	May	Jun	Jul	Aug	Sep	Oct	Nov	Dec	Year
Record high °C (°F)	14.6 (58.3)	19.4 (66.9)	24.3 (75.7)	27.6 (81.7)	29.2 (84.6)	33.9 (93.0)	37.6 (99.7)	36.3 (97.3)	32.6 (90.7)	27.2 (81.0)	20.8 (69.4)	18.5 (65.3)	37.6 (99.7)
Mean maximum °C (°F)	8.1 (46.6)	12.6 (54.7)	13.9 (57.0)	17.1 (62.8)	21.6 (70.9)	26.2 (79.2)	29.2 (84.6)	26.4 (79.5)	24.6 (76.3)	16.8 (62.2)	12.3 (54.1)	8.5 (47.3)	29.2 (84.6)
Mean daily maximum °C (°F)	4.2 (39.6)	5.8 (42.4)	9.5 (49.1)	13.7 (56.7)	17.9 (64.2)	21.1 (70.0)	23.3 (73.9)	23.1 (73.6)	20.1 (68.2)	15.1 (59.2)	8.1 (46.6)	4.9 (40.8)	13.9 (57.0)
Daily mean °C (°F)	1.7 (35.1)	2.5 (36.5)	5.3 (41.5)	8.6 (47.5)	12.5 (54.5)	15.8 (60.4)	17.8 (64.0)	17.6 (63.7)	14.7 (58.5)	10.4 (50.7)	5.1 (41.2)	2.1 (35.8)	9.5 (49.1)
Mean daily minimum °C (°F)	−0.9 (30.4)	−0.7 (30.7)	1.0 (33.8)	3.7 (38.7)	7.4 (45.3)	10.8 (51.4)	12.1 (53.8)	12.1 (53.8)	9.7 (49.5)	6.3 (43.3)	2.0 (35.6)	−0.6 (30.9)	5.2 (41.4)
Mean minimum °C (°F)	−7.1 (19.2)	−8.3 (17.1)	−2.2 (28.0)	1.9 (35.4)	5.7 (42.3)	8.6 (47.5)	10.2 (50.4)	10.2 (50.4)	5.9 (42.6)	2.3 (36.1)	−1.1 (30.0)	−4.7 (23.5)	−8.3 (17.1)
Record low °C (°F)	−21.6 (−6.9)	−19.0 (−2.2)	−15.9 (3.4)	−6.1 (21.0)	−2.9 (26.8)	2.2 (36.0)	2.0 (35.6)	2.8 (37.0)	−1.2 (29.8)	−6.0 (21.2)	−10.2 (13.6)	−19.0 (−2.2)	−21.6 (−6.9)
Average precipitation mm (inches)	57.8 (2.28)	48.4 (1.91)	59.0 (2.32)	44.9 (1.77)	70.1 (2.76)	72.6 (2.86)	55.3 (2.18)	56.5 (2.22)	56.3 (2.22)	52.5 (2.07)	60.4 (2.38)	67.2 (2.65)	701 (27.62)
Average precipitation days (≥ 1.0mm)	13.0	10.0	12.0	10.0	11.5	9.5	7.5	9.0	8.5	9.0	11.5	12.5	124
Average snowy days	6.5	5.0	4.5	1.0	0.0	0.0	0.0	0.0	0.0	trace	2.0	6.5	25.5
Mean monthly sunshine hours	45.4	80.9	120.8	160.3	197.5	215.5	241.9	212.9	164.4	108.4	58.0	45.6	1,651.6
Percentage possible sunshine	17.0	29.0	33.0	39.0	42.0	45.0	50.0	49.0	44.0	33.0	21.0	18.0	35.0
Source: NOAA

== History ==
The history of the site Tomblaine dates back to at least 500 BC in Gallo-Roman times. In the seventeenth century, wars and famines spread across Tomblaine. This resulted in a large decrease in population which has since risen. In 1770, the castle within the town belonged to Prince Louis XVI, the future King of France. The commune was destroyed by the Nazis in 1944. However, reconstructions have taken place, returning the town to its former glory.

== Population ==
Historical population
Year	Pop.	±% p.a.
1968	6,617	—
1975	8,285	+3.26%
1982	7,828	−0.81%
1990	7,956	+0.20%
1999	7,853	−0.14%
2007	7,656	−0.32%
2012	7,840	+0.48%
2017	8,887	+2.54%
2023	9,117	+0.43%
Source: INSEE

== Sports ==
Football is the preferred sport within Tomblaine. The commune pays host to the professional football club, AS Nancy, who currently reside at the Stade Marcel Picot.

== Sister cities ==
Tomblaine has one sister city to date:

- Telgte, Germany

== See also ==
- Communes of the Meurthe-et-Moselle department
- Parc naturel régional de Lorraine
