= Diarville =

- Commune
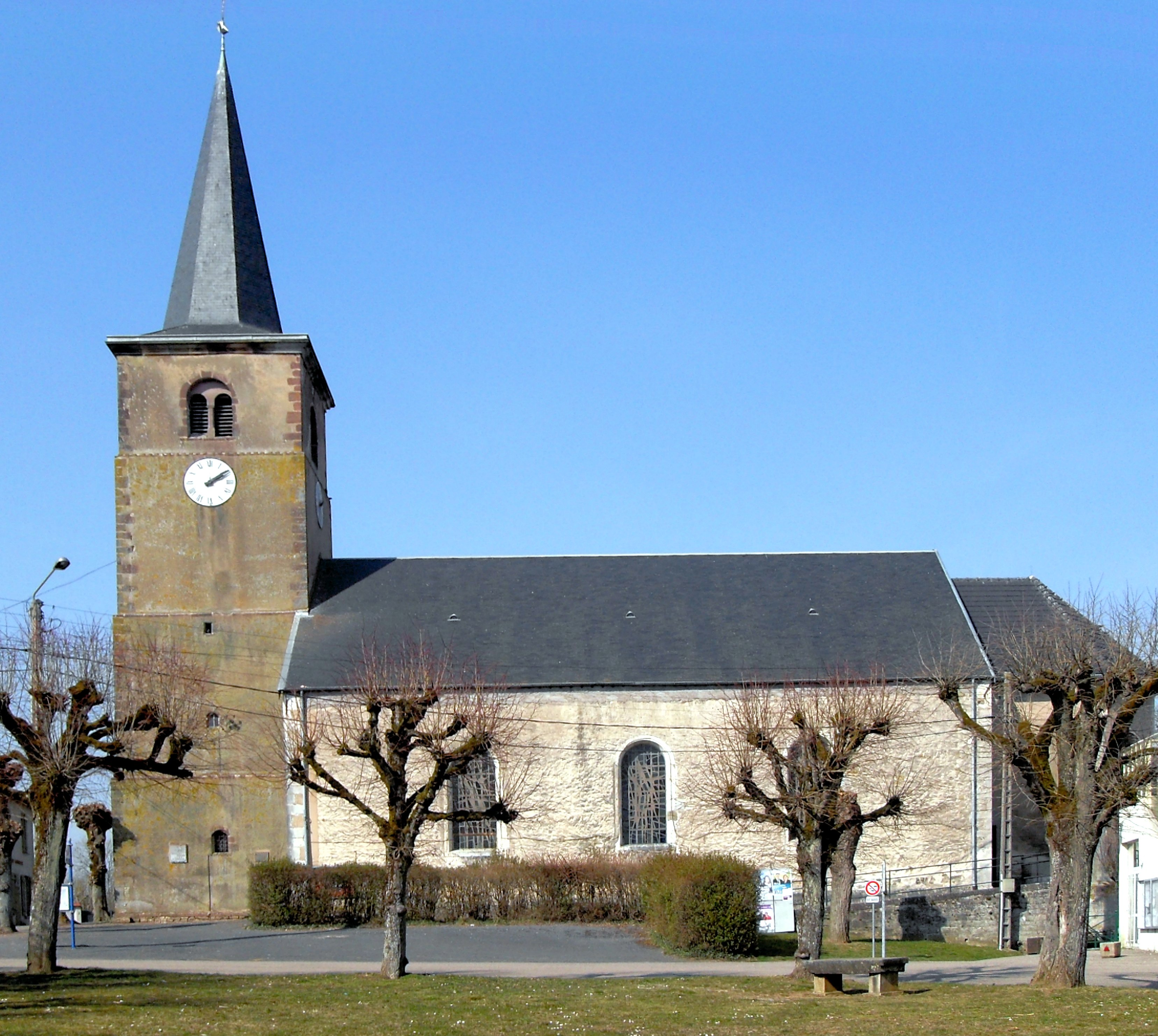
- The church in Diarville

- Coat of arms
- Location of Diarville
- Location within France Location within Grand Est
- Coordinates: 48°23′44″N 6°07′59″E
- Country: France
- Region: Grand Est
- Department: Meurthe-et-Moselle
- Arrondissement: Nancy
- Canton: Meine au Saintois
- Intercommunality: Pays du Saintois

Government
  - Mayor (2023–2026): Bénédicte Haye
- Area^{1}: 11.03 km^{2} (4.26 sq mi)
- Elevation: 282 m (925 ft)
- Highest elevation: 354 m (1,161 ft)
- Lowest elevation: 260 m (850 ft)
- Population (2023): 460
  - Density: 42/km^{2} (110/sq mi)
- Time zone: UTC+01:00 (CET)
  - Summer (DST): UTC+02:00 (CEST)
- INSEE/Postal code: 54156 /54930
- ^{1} French Land Register data, which excludes lakes, ponds, glaciers > 1 km^{2} (0.386 sq mi or 247 acres) and river estuaries.

Diarville (French pronunciation: [djaʁvil]) is a commune in the Meurthe-et-Moselle department in north-eastern France.

== See also ==
- Communes of the Meurthe-et-Moselle department
