= Laneuveville-devant-Bayon =

- Commune
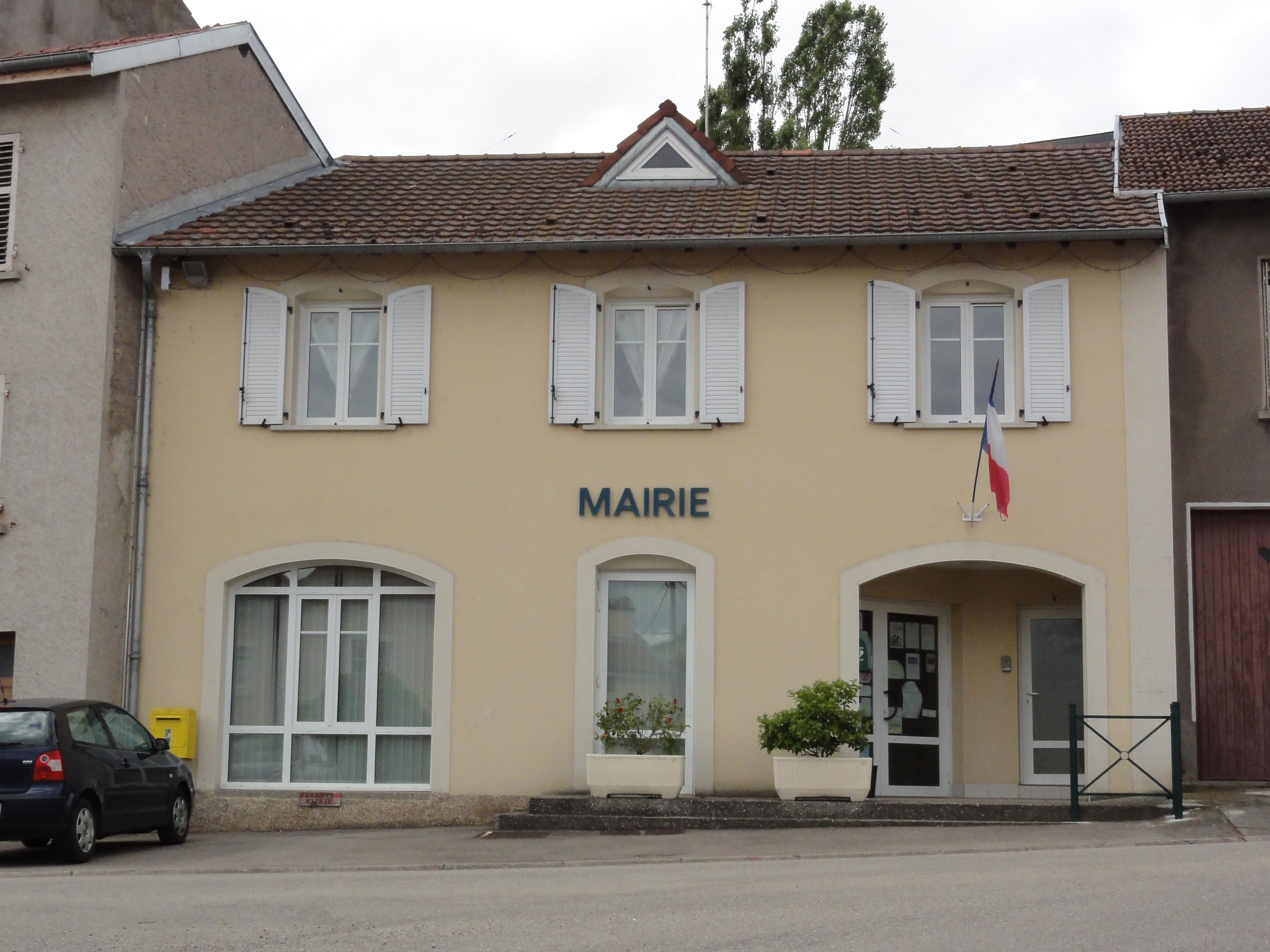
- The town hall in Laneuveville-devant-Bayon

- Coat of arms
- Location of Laneuveville-devant-Bayon
- Location within France Location within Grand Est
- Coordinates: 48°28′17″N 6°16′00″E
- Country: France
- Region: Grand Est
- Department: Meurthe-et-Moselle
- Arrondissement: Nancy
- Canton: Meine au Saintois
- Intercommunality: CC Pays du Saintois

Government
  - Mayor (2020–2026): Maurice Barbezant
- Area^{1}: 5.75 km^{2} (2.22 sq mi)
- Elevation: 300 m (980 ft)
- Highest elevation: 367 m (1,204 ft)
- Lowest elevation: 264 m (866 ft)
- Population (2023): 231
  - Density: 40.2/km^{2} (104/sq mi)
- Time zone: UTC+01:00 (CET)
  - Summer (DST): UTC+02:00 (CEST)
- INSEE/Postal code: 54299 /54740
- ^{1} French Land Register data, which excludes lakes, ponds, glaciers > 1 km^{2} (0.386 sq mi or 247 acres) and river estuaries.

Laneuveville-devant-Bayon (French pronunciation: [lanœvvil dəvɑ̃ bajo], literally Laneuveville before Bayon) is a commune in the Meurthe-et-Moselle department in north-eastern France.

== See also ==
- Communes of the Meurthe-et-Moselle department
