= Velaine-sous-Amance =

- Commune
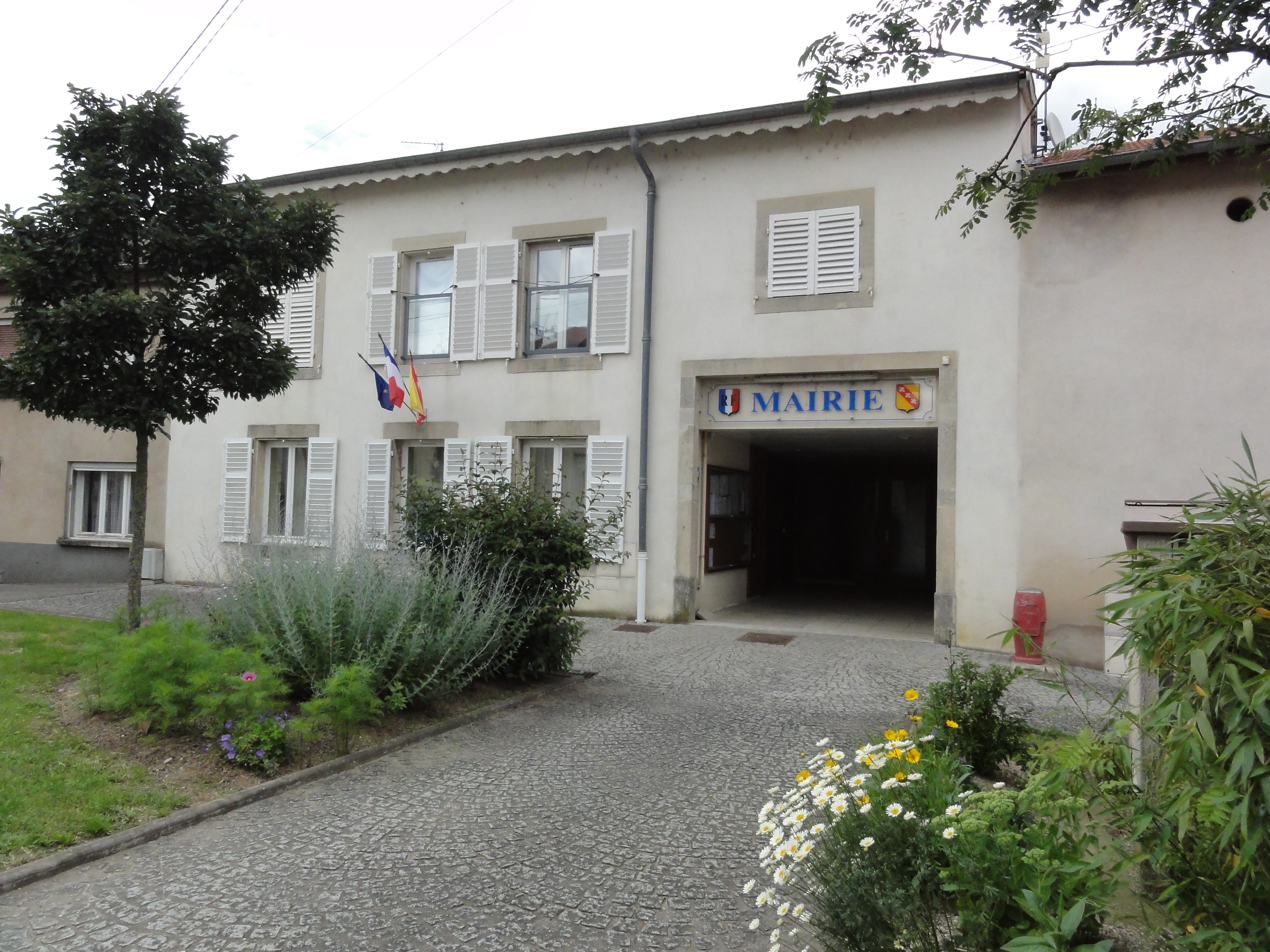
- The town hall in Velaine-sous-Amance

- Coat of arms
- Location of Velaine-sous-Amance
- Location within France Location within Grand Est
- Coordinates: 48°42′50″N 6°19′25″E
- Country: France
- Region: Grand Est
- Department: Meurthe-et-Moselle
- Arrondissement: Nancy
- Canton: Grand Couronné
- Intercommunality: CC Seille et Grand Couronné

Government
  - Mayor (2020–2026): Cedric Baudouin
- Area^{1}: 6.48 km^{2} (2.50 sq mi)
- Elevation: 250 m (820 ft)
- Highest elevation: 288 m (945 ft)
- Lowest elevation: 222 m (728 ft)
- Population (2023): 286
  - Density: 44.1/km^{2} (114/sq mi)
- Time zone: UTC+01:00 (CET)
  - Summer (DST): UTC+02:00 (CEST)
- INSEE/Postal code: 54558 /54280
- ^{1} French Land Register data, which excludes lakes, ponds, glaciers > 1 km^{2} (0.386 sq mi or 247 acres) and river estuaries.

Velaine-sous-Amance (French pronunciation: [vəlɛn su.z‿amɑ̃s], literally Velaine under Amance) is a commune in the Meurthe-et-Moselle department in north-eastern France.

The commune covers an area of 6.48 km^{2} (2.5 sq mi). The current mayor is Cedric Baudouin.

== See also ==
- Communes of the Meurthe-et-Moselle department
