= Canton of Pompey =

Former canton in Meurthe-et-Moselle, France

Coordinates: 48°46′26″N 6°05′18″E

- Former canton
- Location of the canton in the arrondissement of Nancy
- Country: France
- Region: Grand Est
- Department: Meurthe-et-Moselle
- No. of communes: {{{nbcomm}}}
- Disbanded: 2015

Government
  - Representatives: Jean-Marie Ulrich
- Area: 75.78 km^{2} (29.26 sq mi)
- Population (2011): 31,525
  - Density: 416.0/km^{2} (1,077/sq mi)

The canton of Pompey (French: Canton de Pompey) is a former French canton located in the department of Meurthe-et-Moselle in the Lorraine region (now part of Grand Est). This canton was organized around Pompey in the arrondissement of Nancy.

The last general councillor from this canton was Jean-Marie Ulrich (PS), elected in 2008.

== Composition ==
The canton of Pompey grouped together 6 municipalities and had 10,560 inhabitants (2012 census without double counts).

1. Champigneulles
2. Frouard
3. Marbache
4. Maxeville
5. Pompey
6. Saizerais
