= Métropole du Grand Nancy =

Coordinates: 48.6928°N 6.1836°E

- Métropole
- Location in Meurthe-et-Moselle.
- Interactive map of Métropole du Grand Nancy
- Country: France
- Region: Grand Est
- Department: Meurthe-et-Moselle
- No. of communes: {{{nbcomm}}}
- Established: July 2016

Government
  - President (2020–2026): Mathieu Klein (PS)
- Area: 142.3 km^{2} (54.9 sq mi)
- Population (2018): 257,431
  - Density: 1,809/km^{2} (4,685/sq mi)
- Website: Grand-Nancy.org

Métropole du Grand Nancy (French pronunciation: [metʁɔpɔl dy ɡʁɑ̃ nɑ̃si]) is the métropole, an intercommunal structure, centred on the city of Nancy. It is located in the Meurthe-et-Moselle department, in the Grand Est region, northeastern France. It was created in July 2016, replacing the previous Communauté urbaine du Grand Nancy. Its area is 142.3 km^{2}. Its population was 257,431 in 2018, of which 104,885 in Nancy proper.

== History ==
The Urban Community of Greater Nancy (French: Communauté urbaine du Grand Nancy), was created in 1996. On July 1, 2016, the Metropolitan community replaced the Urban Community in accordance with a decree of April 2016.

== Member communes ==
The 20 communes of the metropolis are:

1. Art-sur-Meurthe
2. Dommartemont
3. Essey-lès-Nancy
4. Fléville-devant-Nancy
5. Heillecourt
6. Houdemont
7. Jarville-la-Malgrange
8. Laneuveville-devant-Nancy
9. Laxou
10. Ludres
11. Malzéville
12. Maxéville
13. Nancy
14. Pulnoy
15. Saint-Max
16. Saulxures-lès-Nancy
17. Seichamps
18. Tomblaine
19. Vandœuvre-lès-Nancy
20. Villers-lès-Nancy

== Administration ==
The Metropolitan Council consists of 80 members, one of them being the president, currently André Rossinot, the former mayor of Nancy.
