= Praye =

- Commune
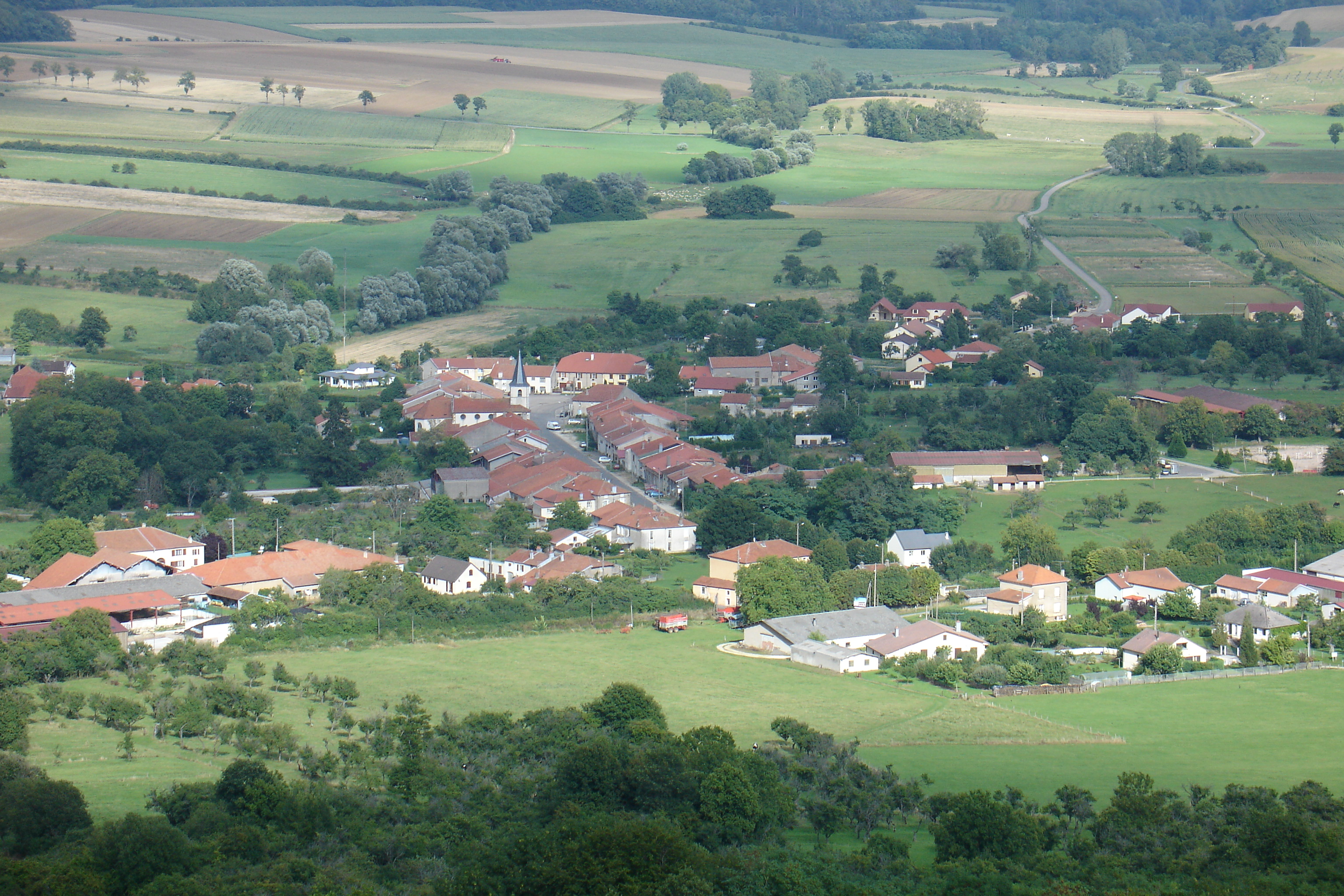
- The village seen from the Colline de Sion

- Coat of arms
- Location of Praye
- Location within France Location within Grand Est
- Coordinates: 48°26′05″N 6°06′25″E
- Country: France
- Region: Grand Est
- Department: Meurthe-et-Moselle
- Arrondissement: Nancy
- Canton: Meine au Saintois
- Intercommunality: Pays du Saintois

Government
  - Mayor (2020–2026): Gilles Griffaton
- Area^{1}: 8.72 km^{2} (3.37 sq mi)
- Highest elevation: 395 m (1,296 ft)
- Lowest elevation: 275 m (902 ft)
- Population (2023): 267
  - Density: 30.6/km^{2} (79.3/sq mi)
- Time zone: UTC+01:00 (CET)
  - Summer (DST): UTC+02:00 (CEST)
- INSEE/Postal code: 54434 /54116
- ^{1} French Land Register data, which excludes lakes, ponds, glaciers > 1 km^{2} (0.386 sq mi or 247 acres) and river estuaries.

Praye (French pronunciation: [pʁɛ]) is a commune in the Meurthe-et-Moselle department in north-eastern France.

== See also ==
- Communes of the Meurthe-et-Moselle department
