= Canton of Nancy-Nord =

Former canton in Meurthe-et-Moselle, France

Coordinates: 48°41′26″N 6°08′39″E

- Former canton
- Interactive map of Canton of Nancy-Nord
- Country: France
- Region: Grand Est
- Department: Meurthe-et-Moselle
- No. of communes: {{{nbcomm}}}
- Disbanded: 2015

Government
  - Representatives: Mathieu Klein
- Population (2012): 23,764

The canton of Nancy-Nord (French: Canton de Nancy-Nord) is a former French canton located in the department of Meurthe-et-Moselle in the Lorraine region (now part of Grand Est).

The last general councillor from this canton was Mathieu Klein (PS), elected in 2004.

== Composition ==
The canton of Nancy-Nord was made up of a fraction of the commune of Nancy and had 23,764 inhabitants (2012 census without double counts).
