= Mazerulles =

- Commune
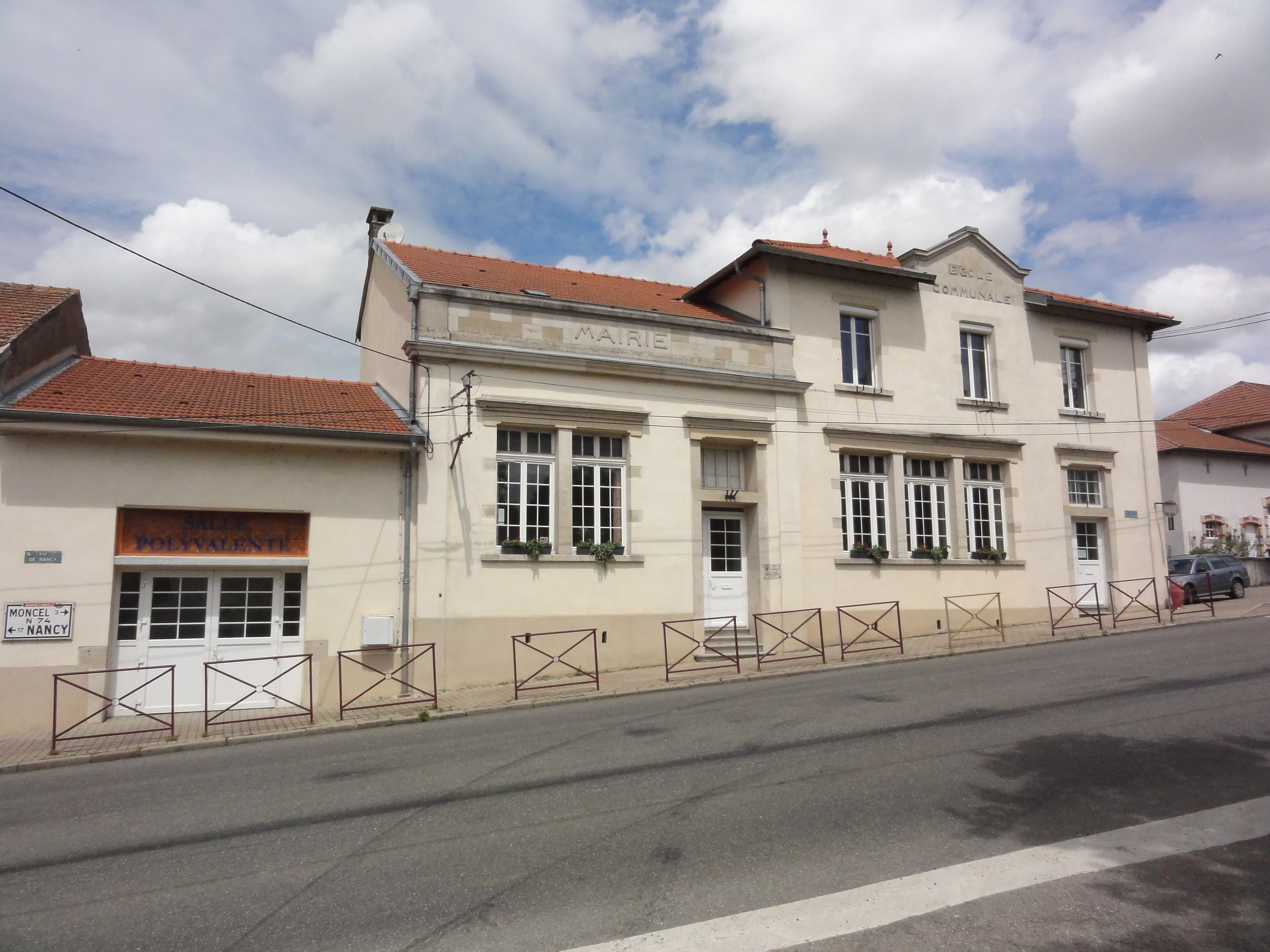
- The town hall and school in Mazerulles

- Coat of arms
- Location of Mazerulles
- Location within France Location within Grand Est
- Coordinates: 48°45′35″N 6°22′56″E
- Country: France
- Region: Grand Est
- Department: Meurthe-et-Moselle
- Arrondissement: Nancy
- Canton: Grand Couronné
- Intercommunality: CC Seille et Grand Couronné

Government
  - Mayor (2020–2026): Franck Diedler
- Area^{1}: 6.38 km^{2} (2.46 sq mi)
- Elevation: 224 m (735 ft)
- Highest elevation: 283 m (928 ft)
- Lowest elevation: 202 m (663 ft)
- Population (2023): 283
  - Density: 44.4/km^{2} (115/sq mi)
- Time zone: UTC+01:00 (CET)
  - Summer (DST): UTC+02:00 (CEST)
- INSEE/Postal code: 54358 /54280
- ^{1} French Land Register data, which excludes lakes, ponds, glaciers > 1 km^{2} (0.386 sq mi or 247 acres) and river estuaries.

Mazerulles (French pronunciation: [mazʁyl]) is a commune in the Meurthe-et-Moselle department in north-eastern France.

The commune covers an area of 6.38 km^{2} (2.46 sq mi). Franck Diedler is the mayor for the 2020-2026 tenure.

== See also ==
- Communes of the Meurthe-et-Moselle department
