= Eulmont =

- Commune
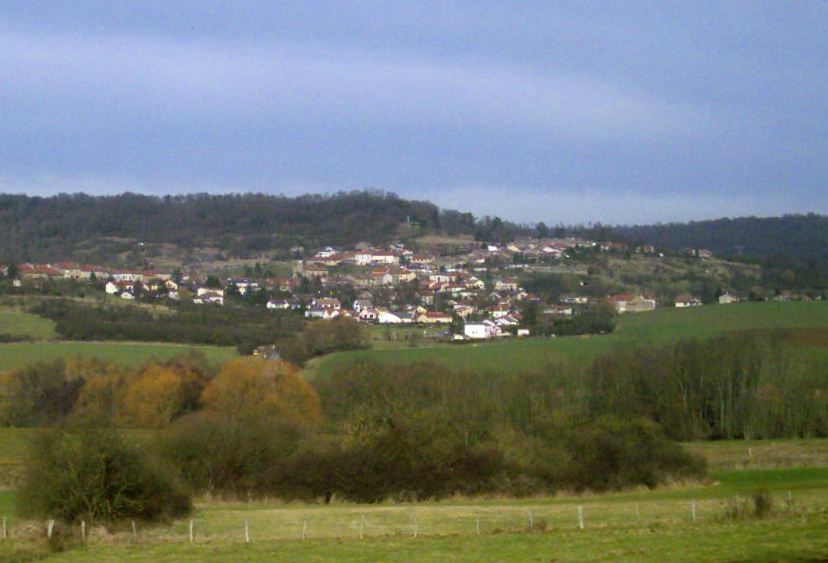
- A general view of Eulmont

- Coat of arms
- Location of Eulmont
- Location within France Location within Grand Est
- Coordinates: 48°45′05″N 6°13′30″E
- Country: France
- Region: Grand Est
- Department: Meurthe-et-Moselle
- Arrondissement: Nancy
- Canton: Grand Couronné
- Intercommunality: CC Seille et Grand Couronné

Government
  - Mayor (2020–2026): Claude Thomas
- Area^{1}: 7.97 km^{2} (3.08 sq mi)
- Elevation: 206 m (676 ft)
- Highest elevation: 397 m (1,302 ft)
- Lowest elevation: 202 m (663 ft)
- Population (2023): 1,120
  - Density: 141/km^{2} (364/sq mi)
- Time zone: UTC+01:00 (CET)
  - Summer (DST): UTC+02:00 (CEST)
- INSEE/Postal code: 54186 /54690
- ^{1} French Land Register data, which excludes lakes, ponds, glaciers > 1 km^{2} (0.386 sq mi or 247 acres) and river estuaries.

Eulmont (French pronunciation: [œlmɔ̃]) is a commune in the Meurthe-et-Moselle department in north-eastern France.

The commune covers an area of 7.97 km^{2} (3.08 sq mi). Claude Thomas is the mayor for the 2020-2026 tenure.

== See also ==
- Communes of the Meurthe-et-Moselle department
