= Cerville =

- Commune
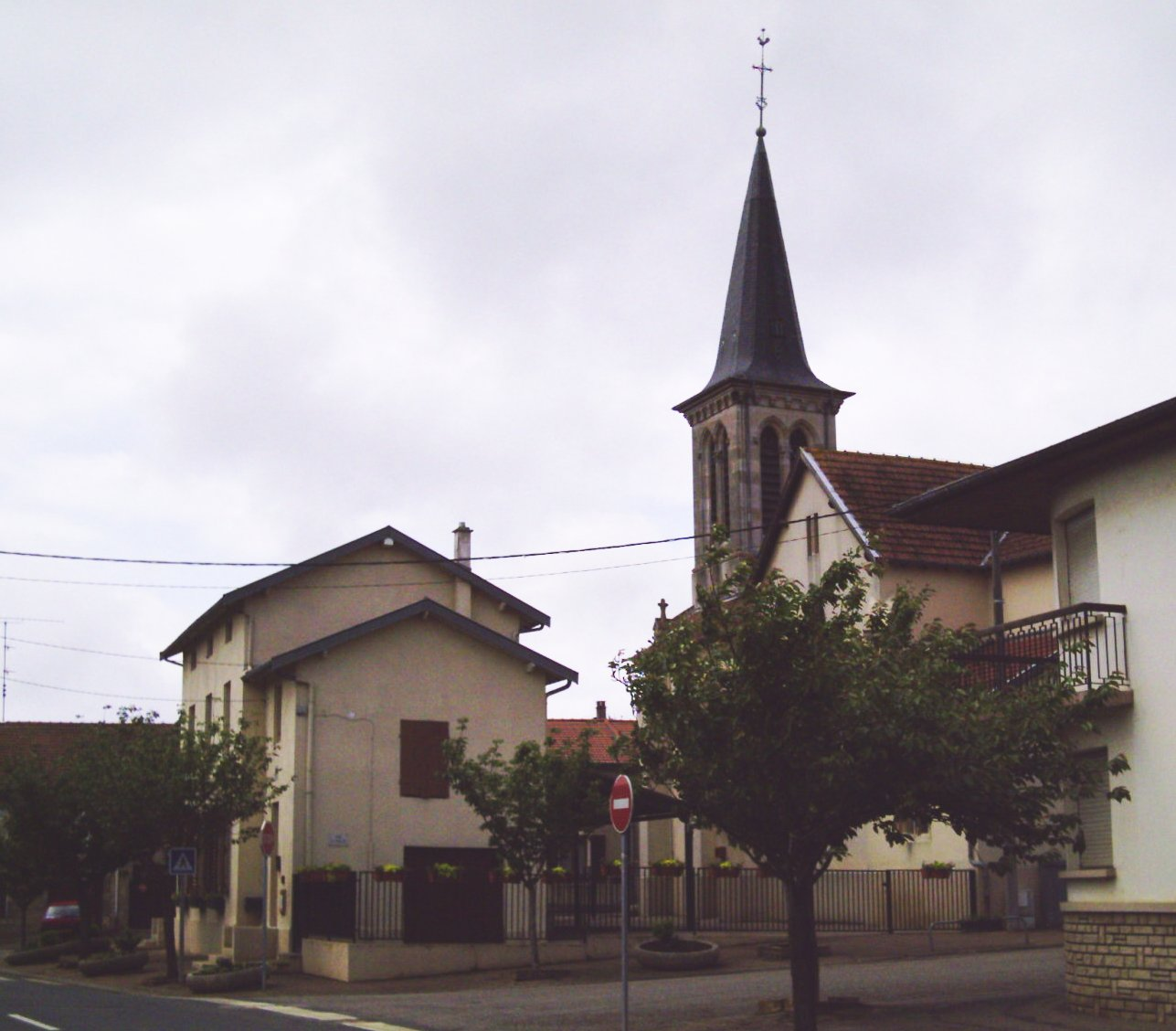
- The church and surroundings in Cerville

- Coat of arms
- Location of Cerville
- Location within France Location within Grand Est
- Coordinates: 48°41′50″N 6°18′49″E
- Country: France
- Region: Grand Est
- Department: Meurthe-et-Moselle
- Arrondissement: Nancy
- Canton: Grand Couronné
- Intercommunality: CC Seille et Grand Couronné

Government
  - Mayor (2020–2026): Gisèle Fromaget
- Area^{1}: 8.19 km^{2} (3.16 sq mi)
- Elevation: 250 m (820 ft)
- Highest elevation: 289 m (948 ft)
- Lowest elevation: 216 m (709 ft)
- Population (2023): 531
  - Density: 64.8/km^{2} (168/sq mi)
- Time zone: UTC+01:00 (CET)
  - Summer (DST): UTC+02:00 (CEST)
- INSEE/Postal code: 54110 /54420
- ^{1} French Land Register data, which excludes lakes, ponds, glaciers > 1 km^{2} (0.386 sq mi or 247 acres) and river estuaries.

Cerville (French pronunciation: [sɛʁvil]) is a commune in the Meurthe-et-Moselle department in north-eastern France.

The commune covers an area of 8.19 km^{2} (3.16 sq mi). Gisèle Fromaget is the mayor for the 2020-2026 tenure.

== See also ==
- Communes of the Meurthe-et-Moselle department
