= Canton of Grand Couronné =

Canton in Grand Est, France

Coordinates: 48.65°N 6.23°E

The canton of Grand Couronné is an administrative division of the Meurthe-et-Moselle department, northeastern France. It was created at the French canton reorganisation which came into effect in March 2015. Its seat is in Laneuveville-devant-Nancy.

It consists of the following communes:

1. Agincourt
2. Amance
3. Art-sur-Meurthe
4. Bouxières-aux-Chênes
5. Buissoncourt
6. Cerville
7. Champenoux
8. Dommartin-sous-Amance
9. Erbéviller-sur-Amezule
10. Eulmont
11. Gellenoncourt
12. Haraucourt
13. Laître-sous-Amance
14. Laneuvelotte
15. Laneuveville-devant-Nancy
16. Lenoncourt
17. Mazerulles
18. Moncel-sur-Seille
19. Pulnoy
20. Réméréville
21. Saulxures-lès-Nancy
22. Seichamps
23. Sornéville
24. Velaine-sous-Amance
