= Sornéville =

- Commune
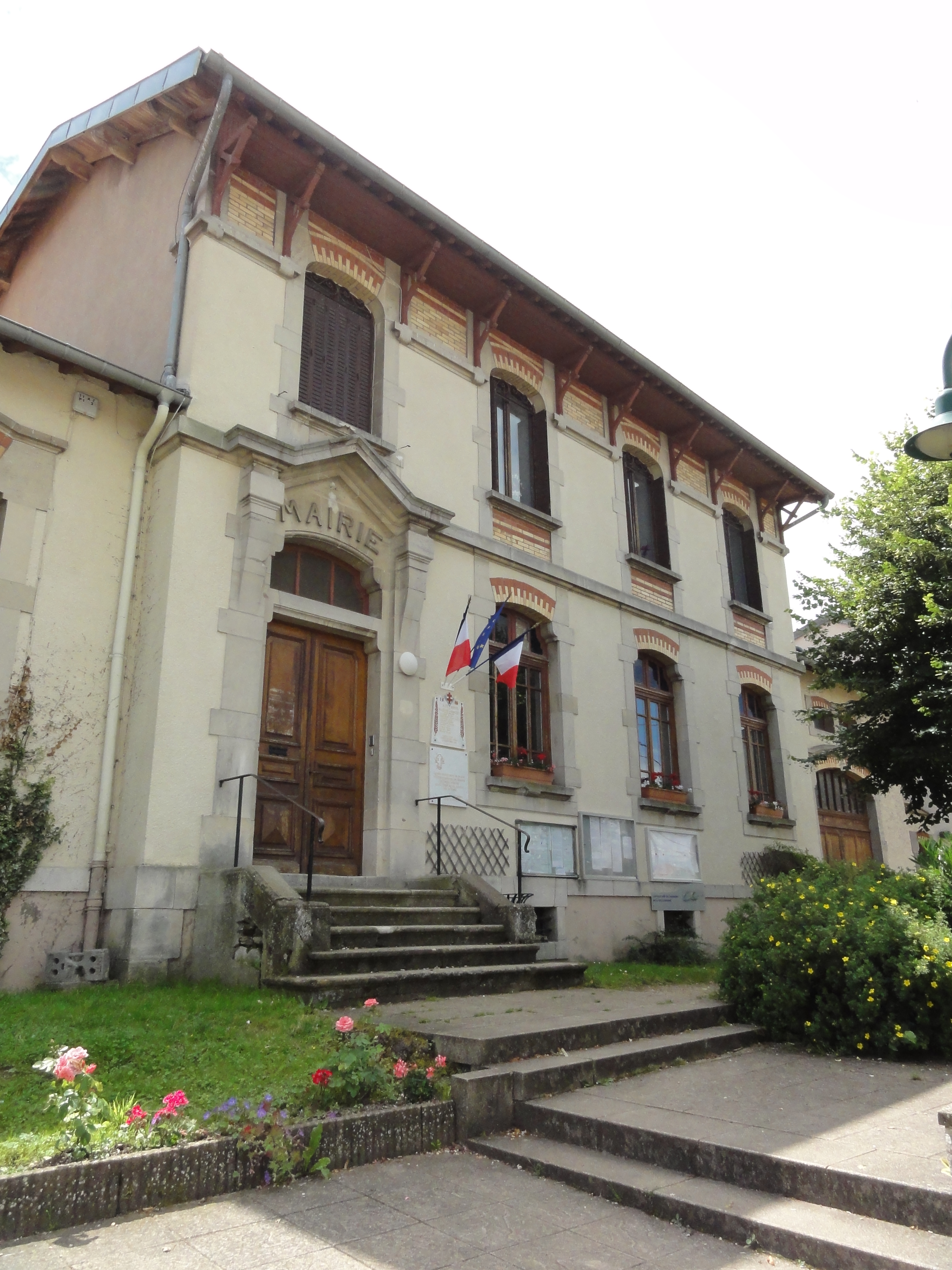
- The town hall in Sornéville

- Coat of arms
- Location of Sornéville
- Location within France Location within Grand Est
- Coordinates: 48°44′55″N 6°25′03″E
- Country: France
- Region: Grand Est
- Department: Meurthe-et-Moselle
- Arrondissement: Nancy
- Canton: Grand Couronné
- Intercommunality: CC Seille et Grand Couronné

Government
  - Mayor (2020–2026): Yvon Vincent
- Area^{1}: 9.22 km^{2} (3.56 sq mi)
- Elevation: 260 m (850 ft)
- Highest elevation: 307 m (1,007 ft)
- Lowest elevation: 203 m (666 ft)
- Population (2023): 356
  - Density: 38.6/km^{2} (100/sq mi)
- Time zone: UTC+01:00 (CET)
  - Summer (DST): UTC+02:00 (CEST)
- INSEE/Postal code: 54510 /54280
- ^{1} French Land Register data, which excludes lakes, ponds, glaciers > 1 km^{2} (0.386 sq mi or 247 acres) and river estuaries.

Sornéville is a commune in the Meurthe-et-Moselle department in north-eastern France.

The commune covers an area of 9.22 km^{2} (3.56 sq mi). Yvon Vincent is the mayor for the 2020-2026 tenure.

== Population ==
Historical population
Year	Pop.	±% p.a.
1968	230	—
1975	220	−0.63%
1982	224	+0.26%
1990	245	+1.13%
1999	253	+0.36%
2007	325	+3.18%
2012	351	+1.55%
2017	328	−1.35%
2023	356	+1.37%
Source: INSEE

== See also ==
- Communes of the Meurthe-et-Moselle department
