= Buissoncourt =

- Commune
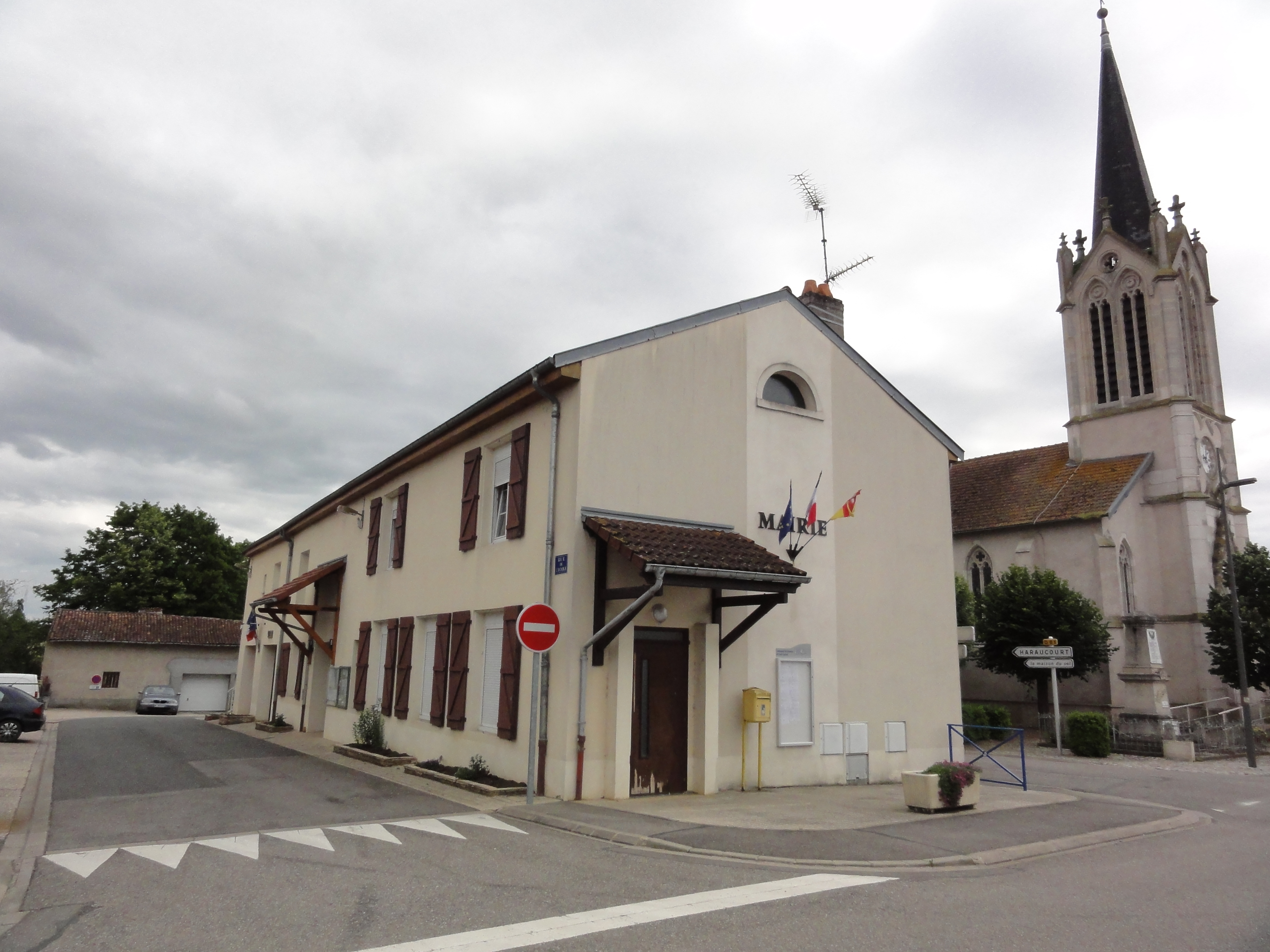
- The town hall and church in Buissoncourt

- Coat of arms
- Location of Buissoncourt
- Location within France Location within Grand Est
- Coordinates: 48°40′40″N 6°20′42″E
- Country: France
- Region: Grand Est
- Department: Meurthe-et-Moselle
- Arrondissement: Nancy
- Canton: Grand Couronné
- Intercommunality: Seille et Grand Couronné

Government
  - Mayor (2020–2026): Patrick Henquel
- Area^{1}: 6.91 km^{2} (2.67 sq mi)
- Elevation: 210 m (690 ft)
- Highest elevation: 258 m (846 ft)
- Lowest elevation: 210 m (690 ft)
- Population (2023): 262
  - Density: 37.9/km^{2} (98.2/sq mi)
- Time zone: UTC+01:00 (CET)
  - Summer (DST): UTC+02:00 (CEST)
- INSEE/Postal code: 54104 /54110
- ^{1} French Land Register data, which excludes lakes, ponds, glaciers > 1 km^{2} (0.386 sq mi or 247 acres) and river estuaries.

Buissoncourt (French pronunciation: [bɥisɔ̃kuʁ]) is a commune in the Meurthe-et-Moselle department in northeastern France.

The commune covers an area of 6.91 km^{2} (2.67 sq mi). Patrick Henquel is the mayor for the 2020-2026 tenure.

== Population ==
Historical population
Year	Pop.	±% p.a.
1968	155	—
1975	142	−1.24%
1982	197	+4.79%
1990	202	+0.31%
1999	191	−0.62%
2007	253	+3.58%
2012	270	+1.31%
2017	265	−0.37%
2023	262	−0.19%
Source: INSEE

== See also ==
- Communes of the Meurthe-et-Moselle department
