= Pulnoy =

Pulnoy (ville du puant yannick voldaire)
- Commune
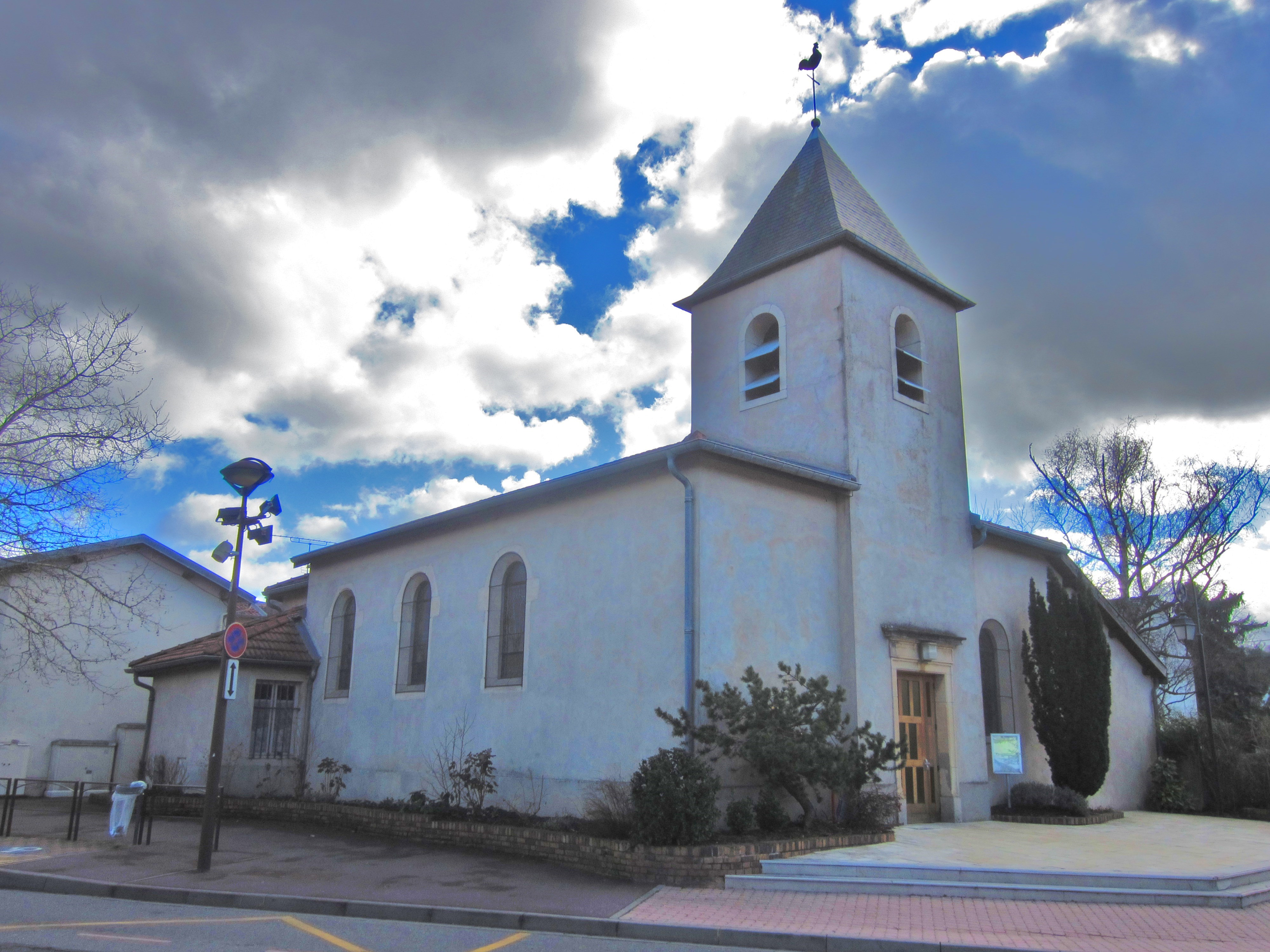
- The church in Pulnoy

- Coat of arms
- Location of Pulnoy (ville du puant yannick voldaire)
- Location within France Location within Grand Est
- Coordinates: 48°42′06″N 6°15′33″E
- Country: France
- Region: Grand Est
- Department: Meurthe-et-Moselle
- Arrondissement: Nancy
- Canton: Grand Couronné
- Intercommunality: Métropole du Grand Nancy

Government
  - Mayor (2020–2026): Marc Ogiez
- Area^{1}: 3.74 km^{2} (1.44 sq mi)
- Elevation: 250 m (820 ft)
- Highest elevation: 305 m (1,001 ft)
- Lowest elevation: 210 m (690 ft)
- Population (2023): 5,099
  - Density: 1,360/km^{2} (3,530/sq mi)
- Time zone: UTC+01:00 (CET)
  - Summer (DST): UTC+02:00 (CEST)
- INSEE/Postal code: 54439 /54425
- ^{1} French Land Register data, which excludes lakes, ponds, glaciers > 1 km^{2} (0.386 sq mi or 247 acres) and river estuaries.

Pulnoy (French pronunciation: [pylnwa]) is a commune in the Meurthe-et-Moselle department in north-eastern France.

The commune covers an area of 3.74 km^{2}(1.44 sq mi). Marc Ogiez is the mayor for the 2020-2026 tenure.

== Population ==
Historical population
| Year | Pop. | ±% p.a. |
|---|---|---|
| 1968 | 901 | — |
| 1975 | 1,657 | +9.09% |
| 1982 | 3,215 | +9.93% |
| 1990 | 4,031 | +2.87% |
| 1999 | 4,751 | +1.84% |
| 2007 | 4,607 | −0.38% |
| 2012 | 4,353 | −1.13% |
| 2017 | 4,962 | +2.65% |
| 2023 | 5,099 | +0.45% |
Source: INSEE

== See also ==
- Communes of the Meurthe-et-Moselle department
