= Laître-sous-Amance =

- Commune
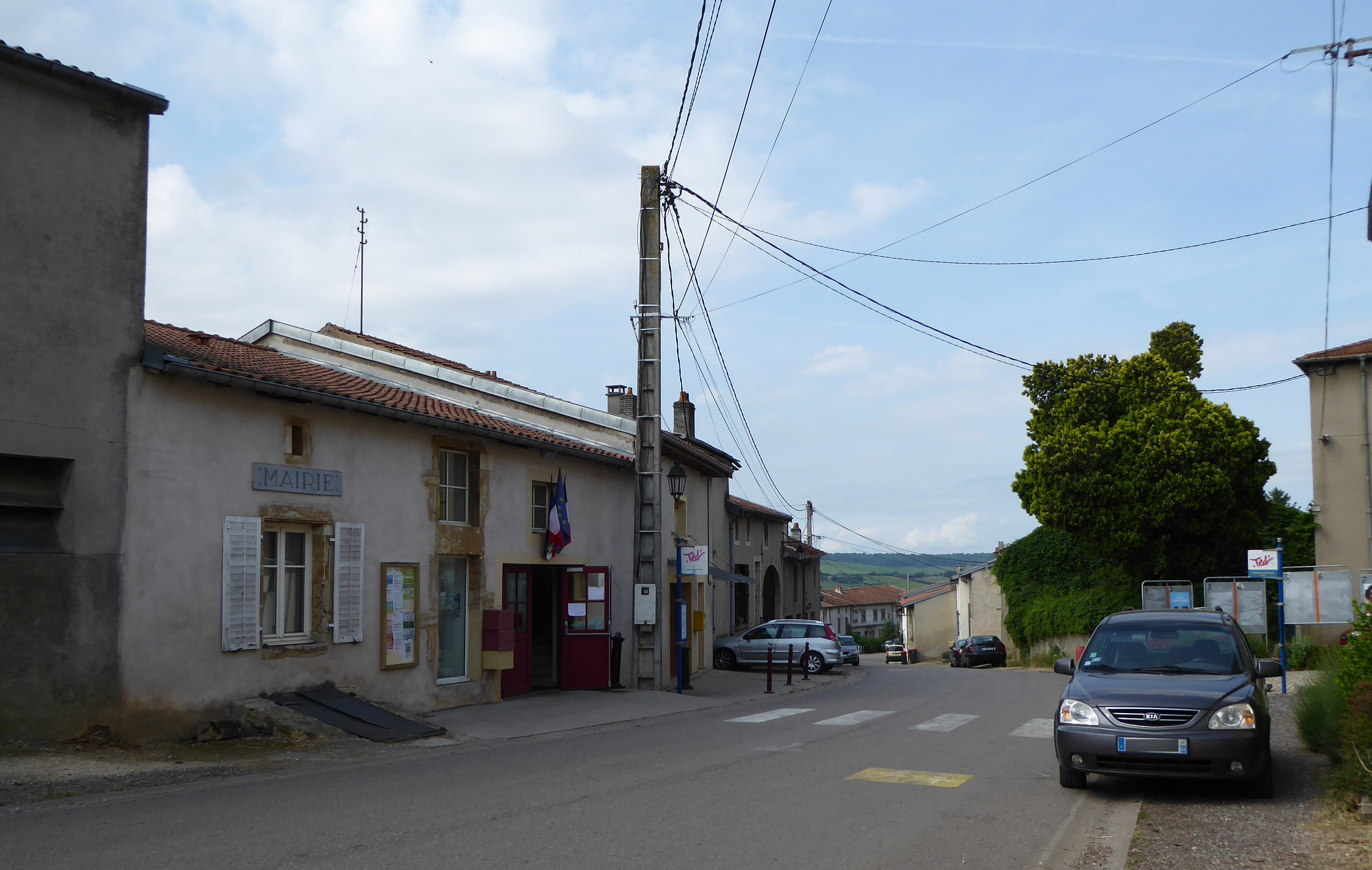
- The town hall in Laître-sous-Amance

- Coat of arms
- Location of Laître-sous-Amance
- Location within France Location within Grand Est
- Coordinates: 48°44′50″N 6°16′34″E
- Country: France
- Region: Grand Est
- Department: Meurthe-et-Moselle
- Arrondissement: Nancy
- Canton: Grand Couronné
- Intercommunality: CC Seille et Grand Couronné

Government
  - Mayor (2020–2026): Mickaël Mevellec
- Area^{1}: 5.11 km^{2} (1.97 sq mi)
- Elevation: 280 m (920 ft)
- Highest elevation: 314 m (1,030 ft)
- Lowest elevation: 211 m (692 ft)
- Population (2023): 361
  - Density: 70.6/km^{2} (183/sq mi)
- Time zone: UTC+01:00 (CET)
  - Summer (DST): UTC+02:00 (CEST)
- INSEE/Postal code: 54289 /54770
- ^{1} French Land Register data, which excludes lakes, ponds, glaciers > 1 km^{2} (0.386 sq mi or 247 acres) and river estuaries.

Laître-sous-Amance (French pronunciation: [lɛtʁ su.z‿amɑ̃s]) is a commune in the Meurthe-et-Moselle department in north-eastern France.

The commune covers an area of 5.11 km^{2} (1.97 sq mi). Mickaël Mevellec is the mayor for the 2020-2026 tenure.

== Demography ==
Historical population
Year	Pop.	±% p.a.
1968	227	—
1975	252	+1.50%
1982	332	+4.02%
1990	370	+1.36%
1999	389	+0.56%
2007	377	−0.39%
2012	374	−0.16%
2017	397	+1.20%
2023	361	−1.57%
Source: INSEE

== See also ==
- Communes of the Meurthe-et-Moselle department
