= Seichamps =

- Commune
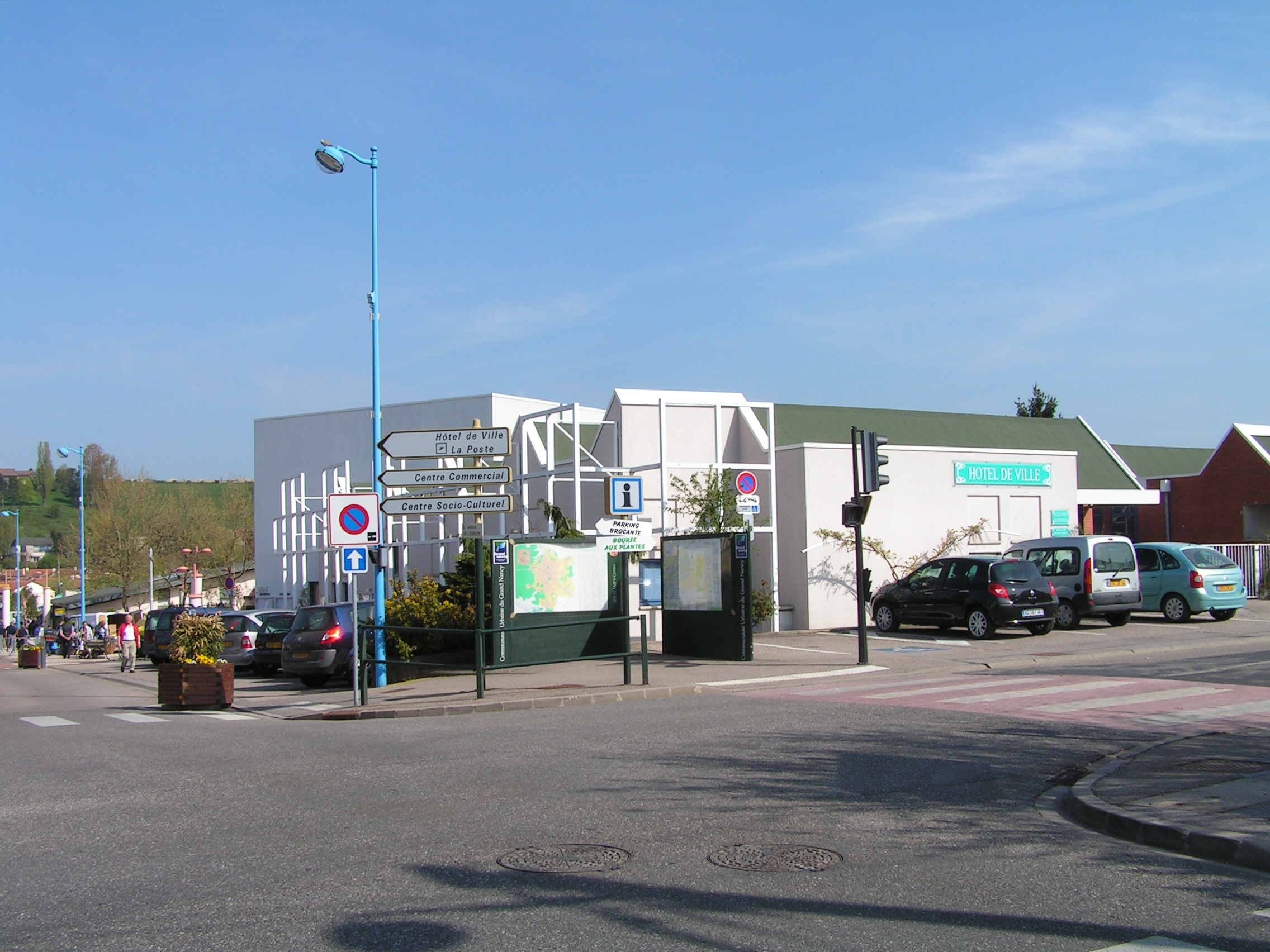
- The town hall in Seichamps

- Coat of arms
- Location of Seichamps
- Location within France Location within Grand Est
- Coordinates: 48°43′12″N 6°16′12″E
- Country: France
- Region: Grand Est
- Department: Meurthe-et-Moselle
- Arrondissement: Nancy
- Canton: Grand Couronné
- Intercommunality: Métropole du Grand Nancy

Government
  - Mayor (2020–2026): Henri Chanut
- Area^{1}: 4.30 km^{2} (1.66 sq mi)
- Highest elevation: 275 m (902 ft)
- Lowest elevation: 212 m (696 ft)
- Population (2023): 5,165
  - Density: 1,200/km^{2} (3,110/sq mi)
- Demonym(s): Seichanais, Seichanaises
- Time zone: UTC+01:00 (CET)
  - Summer (DST): UTC+02:00 (CEST)
- INSEE/Postal code: 54498 /54280
- Website: www.mairie-seichamps.fr
- ^{1} French Land Register data, which excludes lakes, ponds, glaciers > 1 km^{2} (0.386 sq mi or 247 acres) and river estuaries.

Seichamps (French pronunciation: [sɛʃɑ̃]) is a commune in the Lorraine region, Meurthe-et-Moselle department in north-eastern France.

The commune covers an area of 4.30 km² (1.66 sq mi). Henri Chanut is the mayor for the 2020-2026 tenure.

The town hosted Grand Prix automobile racing on its public roads in 1932 and 1935. The races were called Grand Prix de Lorraine (Lorraine Grand Prix).

== Population ==
Historical population
Year	Pop.	±% p.a.
1968	2,093	—
1975	3,773	+8.78%
1982	4,651	+3.03%
1990	5,780	+2.75%
1999	5,475	−0.60%
2007	5,146	−0.77%
2012	4,891	−1.01%
2017	4,952	+0.25%
2023	5,165	+0.70%
Source: INSEE

== See also ==
- Communes of the Meurthe-et-Moselle department
