= Moncel-sur-Seille =

- Commune
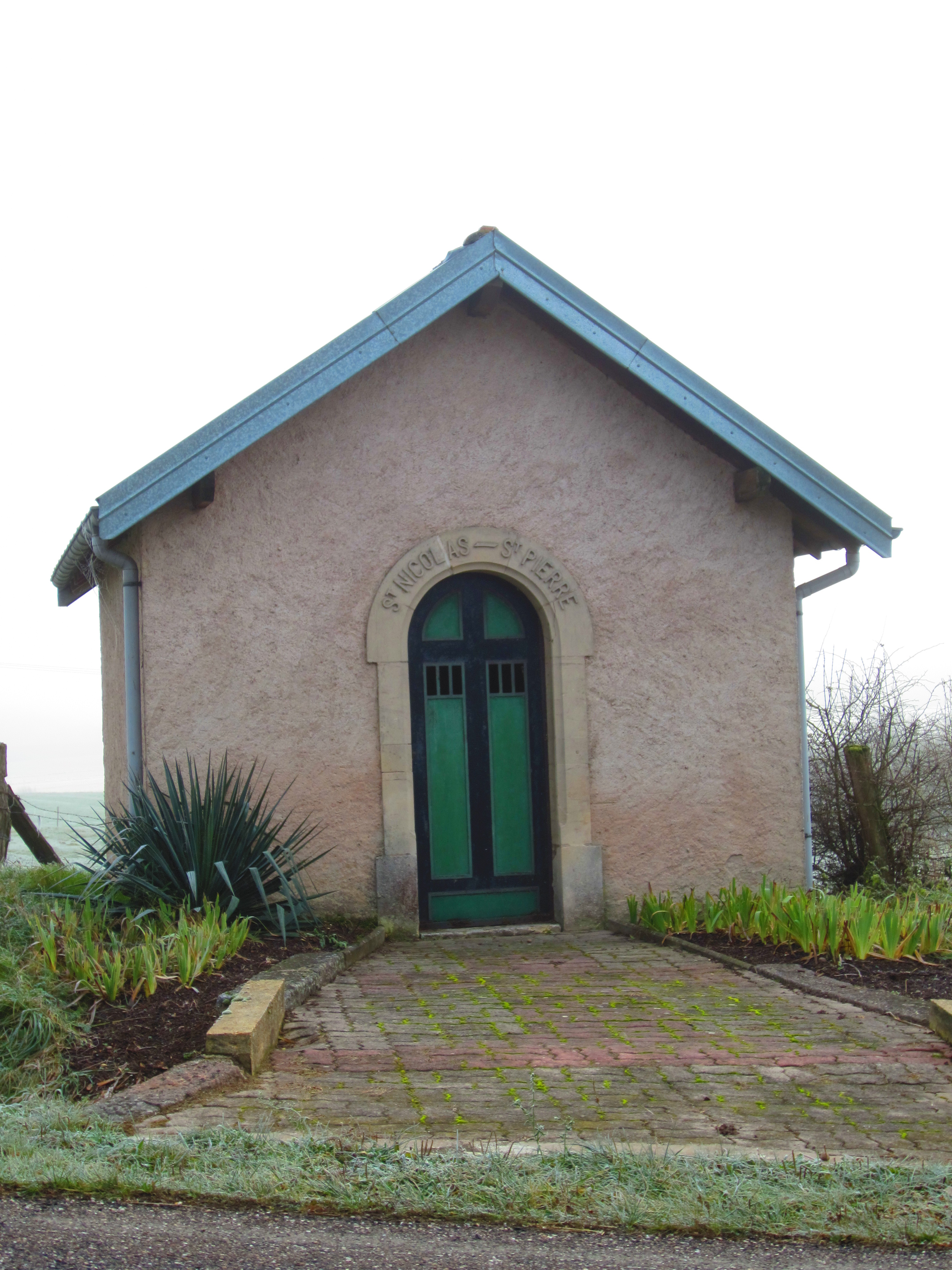
- The chapel in Moncel-sur-Seille

- Coat of arms
- Location of Moncel-sur-Seille
- Location within France Location within Grand Est
- Coordinates: 48°45′57″N 6°25′21″E
- Country: France
- Region: Grand Est
- Department: Meurthe-et-Moselle
- Arrondissement: Nancy
- Canton: Grand Couronné
- Intercommunality: CC Seille et Grand Couronné

Government
  - Mayor (2020–2026): Alain Chane
- Area^{1}: 12.41 km^{2} (4.79 sq mi)
- Elevation: 206 m (676 ft)
- Highest elevation: 283 m (928 ft)
- Lowest elevation: 195 m (640 ft)
- Population (2023): 548
  - Density: 44.2/km^{2} (114/sq mi)
- Time zone: UTC+01:00 (CET)
  - Summer (DST): UTC+02:00 (CEST)
- INSEE/Postal code: 54374 /54280
- ^{1} French Land Register data, which excludes lakes, ponds, glaciers > 1 km^{2} (0.386 sq mi or 247 acres) and river estuaries.

Moncel-sur-Seille (French pronunciation: [mɔ̃sɛl syʁ sɛj], literally Moncel on Seille) is a commune in the Meurthe-et-Moselle département in north-eastern France.

The commune covers an area of 12.41 km² (4.79 sq mi). Alain Chane is the mayor for the 2020-2026 tenure.

In the past, inhabitants of Moncel were known by their neighbours as culs crottés ("shit arses"), on account of the unusually clingy mud of their village.

== Population ==
Historical population
Year	Pop.	±% p.a.
1968	324	—
1975	311	−0.58%
1982	434	+4.88%
1990	485	+1.40%
1999	474	−0.25%
2007	492	+0.47%
2012	474	−0.74%
2017	523	+1.99%
2023	548	+0.78%
Source: INSEE

== See also ==
- Communes of the Meurthe-et-Moselle department
