= Gellenoncourt =

- Commune
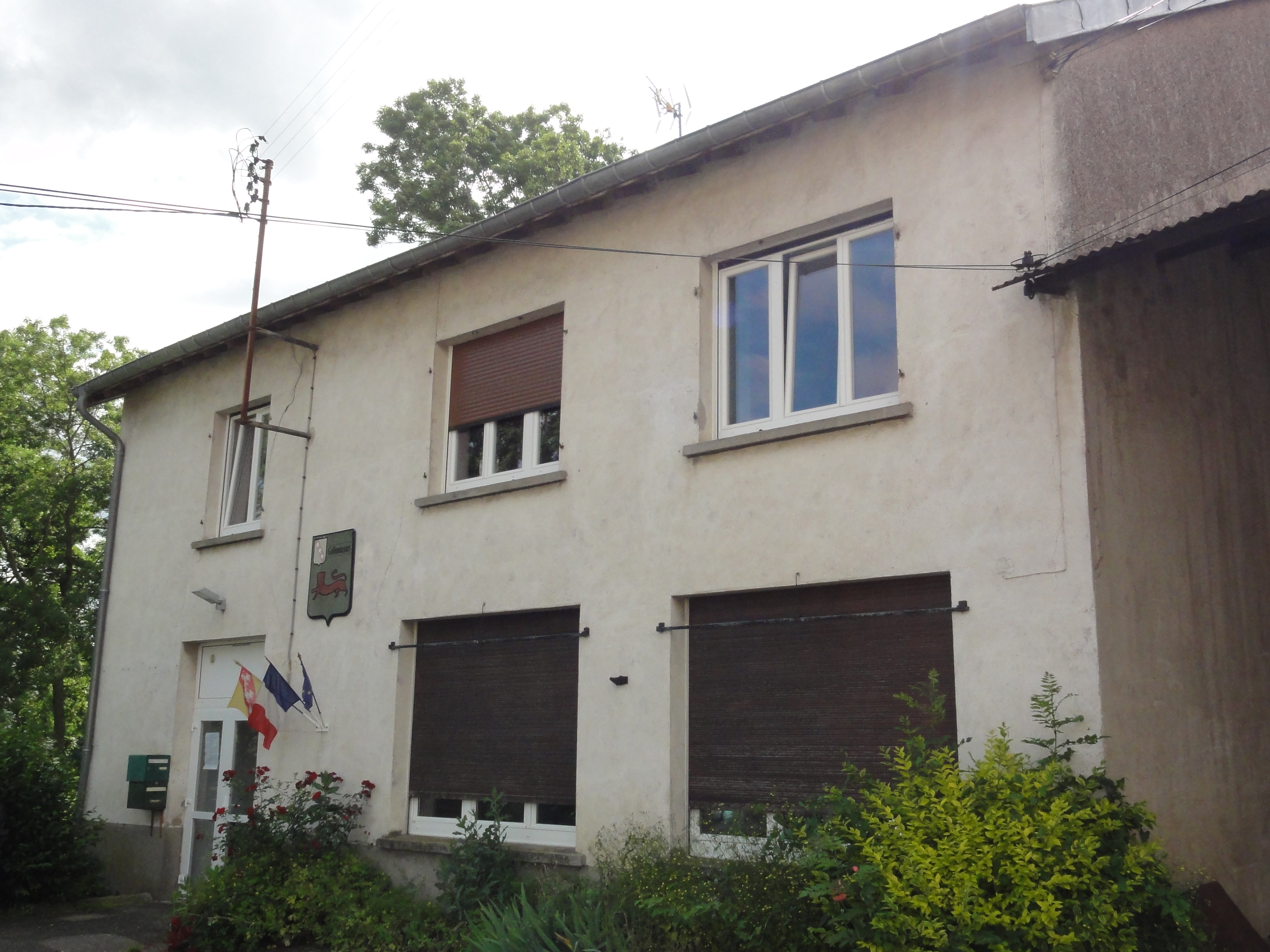
- The town hall in Gellenoncourt

- Coat of arms
- Location of Gellenoncourt
- Location within France Location within Grand Est
- Coordinates: 48°40′43″N 6°23′13″E
- Country: France
- Region: Grand Est
- Department: Meurthe-et-Moselle
- Arrondissement: Nancy
- Canton: Grand Couronné
- Intercommunality: CC Seille et Grand Couronné

Government
  - Mayor (2020–2026): Patrick Poirel
- Area^{1}: 3.61 km^{2} (1.39 sq mi)
- Elevation: 235 m (771 ft)
- Highest elevation: 269 m (883 ft)
- Lowest elevation: 217 m (712 ft)
- Population (2023): 81
  - Density: 22/km^{2} (58/sq mi)
- Time zone: UTC+01:00 (CET)
  - Summer (DST): UTC+02:00 (CEST)
- INSEE/Postal code: 54219 /54110
- ^{1} French Land Register data, which excludes lakes, ponds, glaciers > 1 km^{2} (0.386 sq mi or 247 acres) and river estuaries.

Gellenoncourt (French pronunciation: [ʒɛlnɔ̃kuʁ]) is a commune in the Meurthe-et-Moselle department in north-eastern France.

The commune covers an area of 3.61 km^{2} (1.39 sq mi). Patrick Poirel is the mayor for the 2020-2026 tenure.

== See also ==
- Communes of the Meurthe-et-Moselle department
