= Lenoncourt =

- Commune
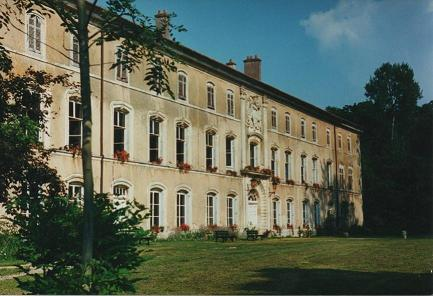
- The chateau in Lenoncourt

- Coat of arms
- Location of Lenoncourt
- Location within France Location within Grand Est
- Coordinates: 48°40′01″N 6°18′16″E
- Country: France
- Region: Grand Est
- Department: Meurthe-et-Moselle
- Arrondissement: Nancy
- Canton: Grand Couronné
- Intercommunality: CC Seille et Grand Couronné

Government
  - Mayor (2020–2026): Philippe Thiry
- Area^{1}: 11.53 km^{2} (4.45 sq mi)
- Elevation: 230 m (750 ft)
- Highest elevation: 275 m (902 ft)
- Lowest elevation: 204 m (669 ft)
- Population (2023): 593
  - Density: 51.4/km^{2} (133/sq mi)
- Time zone: UTC+01:00 (CET)
  - Summer (DST): UTC+02:00 (CEST)
- INSEE/Postal code: 54311 /54110
- ^{1} French Land Register data, which excludes lakes, ponds, glaciers > 1 km^{2} (0.386 sq mi or 247 acres) and river estuaries.

Lenoncourt (French pronunciation: [lənɔ̃kuʁ]) is a commune in the Meurthe-et-Moselle department in north-eastern France.

The commune covers an area of 11.53 km^{2} (4.45 sq mi). Philippe Thiry is the mayor for the 2020-2026 tenure.

== Population ==
Historical population
Year	Pop.	±% p.a.
1968	365	—
1975	339	−1.05%
1982	317	−0.95%
1990	377	+2.19%
1999	433	+1.55%
2007	560	+3.27%
2012	593	+1.15%
2017	592	−0.03%
2023	593	+0.03%
Source: INSEE

== Landmarks ==
- Numerous Gallo-Roman remains found in the 19th century.
- Château de Lenoncourt 13th / 14th century: Founded by Thierry de Nancy. Protected under Historical Monuments.
- Sondages salins de la valley of Roanne(also on commune of Varangéville) in Lenoncourt. Founded in 1855, the company Daguin had five groups of soundings in the valleys of Meurthe and Roanne. Boreholes are sheltered by well-structured pyramidal structures or in agglomerated crassier buildings with a two-sided roof. These saline soundings constitute an exceptional vestige of a mode of exploitation which had its full extension from the 1880s to the Second World War and have been registered with the historical monuments since 1986. The soundings were closed in 1967.
- Church with a tower and nave 18th century, choir 15th century.
- Presbytery 18th century.

== See also ==
- Communes of the Meurthe-et-Moselle department
