= Laneuvelotte =

- Commune
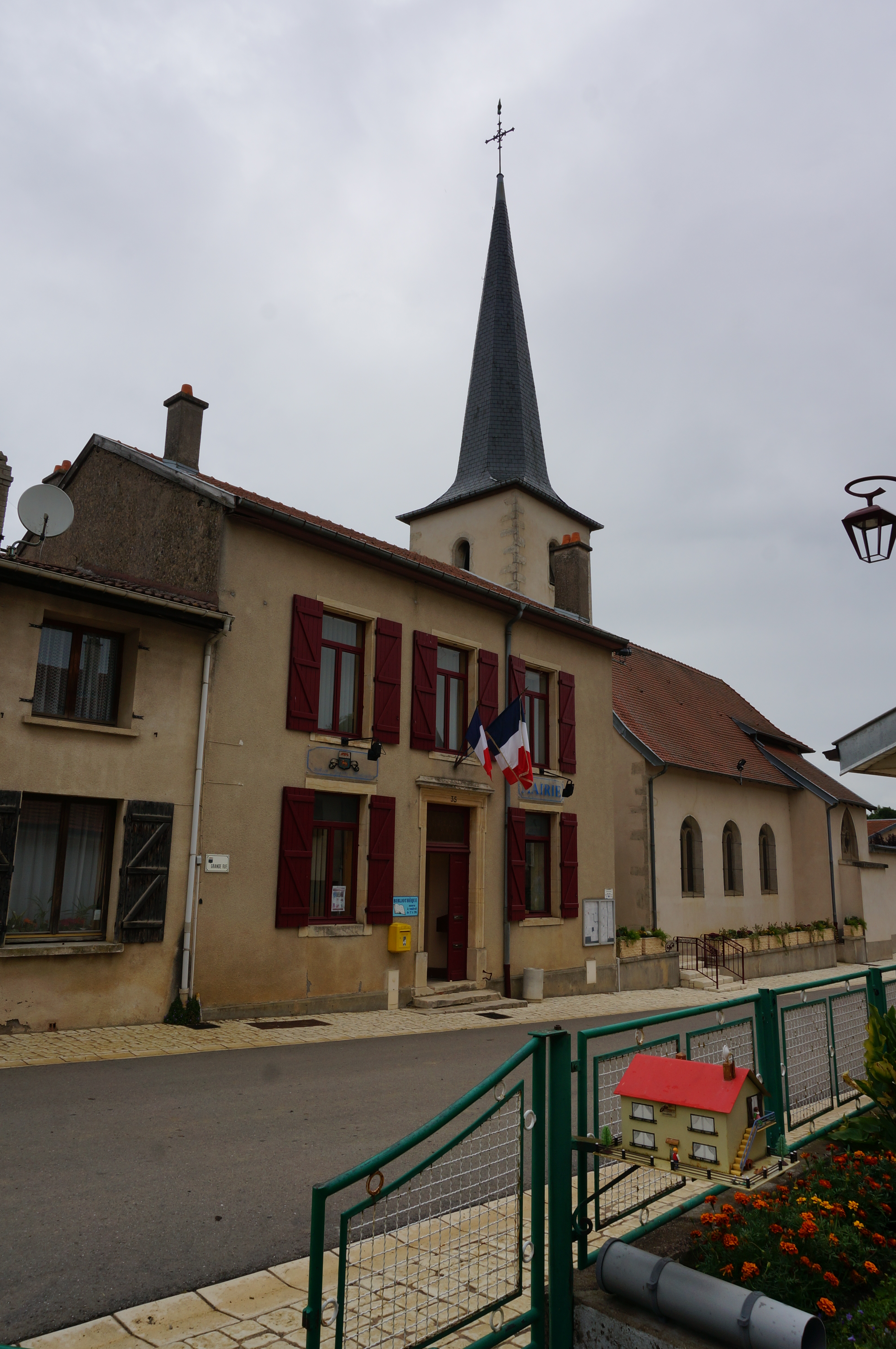
- The town hall and church in Laneuvelotte

- Coat of arms
- Location of Laneuvelotte
- Location within France Location within Grand Est
- Coordinates: 48°43′47″N 6°17′38″E
- Country: France
- Region: Grand Est
- Department: Meurthe-et-Moselle
- Arrondissement: Nancy
- Canton: Grand Couronné
- Intercommunality: CC Seille et Grand Couronné

Government
  - Mayor (2020–2026): Nicolas L'Huillier
- Area^{1}: 9.13 km^{2} (3.53 sq mi)
- Elevation: 231 m (758 ft)
- Highest elevation: 283 m (928 ft)
- Lowest elevation: 214 m (702 ft)
- Population (2023): 430
  - Density: 47/km^{2} (120/sq mi)
- Time zone: UTC+01:00 (CET)
  - Summer (DST): UTC+02:00 (CEST)
- INSEE/Postal code: 54296 /54280
- ^{1} French Land Register data, which excludes lakes, ponds, glaciers > 1 km^{2} (0.386 sq mi or 247 acres) and river estuaries.

Laneuvelotte (French pronunciation: [lanœvlɔt]) is a commune in the Meurthe-et-Moselle department in north-eastern France.

The commune covers an area of 9.13 km^{2} (3.53 sq mi). Nicolas L'Huillier is the mayor for the 2020-2026 tenure.

== See also ==
- Communes of the Meurthe-et-Moselle department
