= Canton of Nancy-Ouest =

Former canton in Meurthe-et-Moselle, France

Coordinates: 48°40′37″N 6°06′54″E

- Former canton
- Interactive map of Canton of Nancy-Ouest
- Country: France
- Region: Grand Est
- Department: Meurthe-et-Moselle
- No. of communes: {{{nbcomm}}}
- Disbanded: 2015

Government
  - Representatives: Sophie Mayeux
- Population (2012): 30,637

The canton of Nancy-Ouest (French: Canton de Nancy-Ouest) is a former French canton located in the department of Meurthe-et-Moselle in the Lorraine region (now part of Grand Est).

The last general councillor from this canton was Sophie Mayeux (DVD), elected in 2011.

== Composition ==
The canton of Nancy-Ouest was made up of a fraction of the commune of Nancy and had 30,637 inhabitants (2012 census without double counts).
