= Erbéviller-sur-Amezule =

- Commune
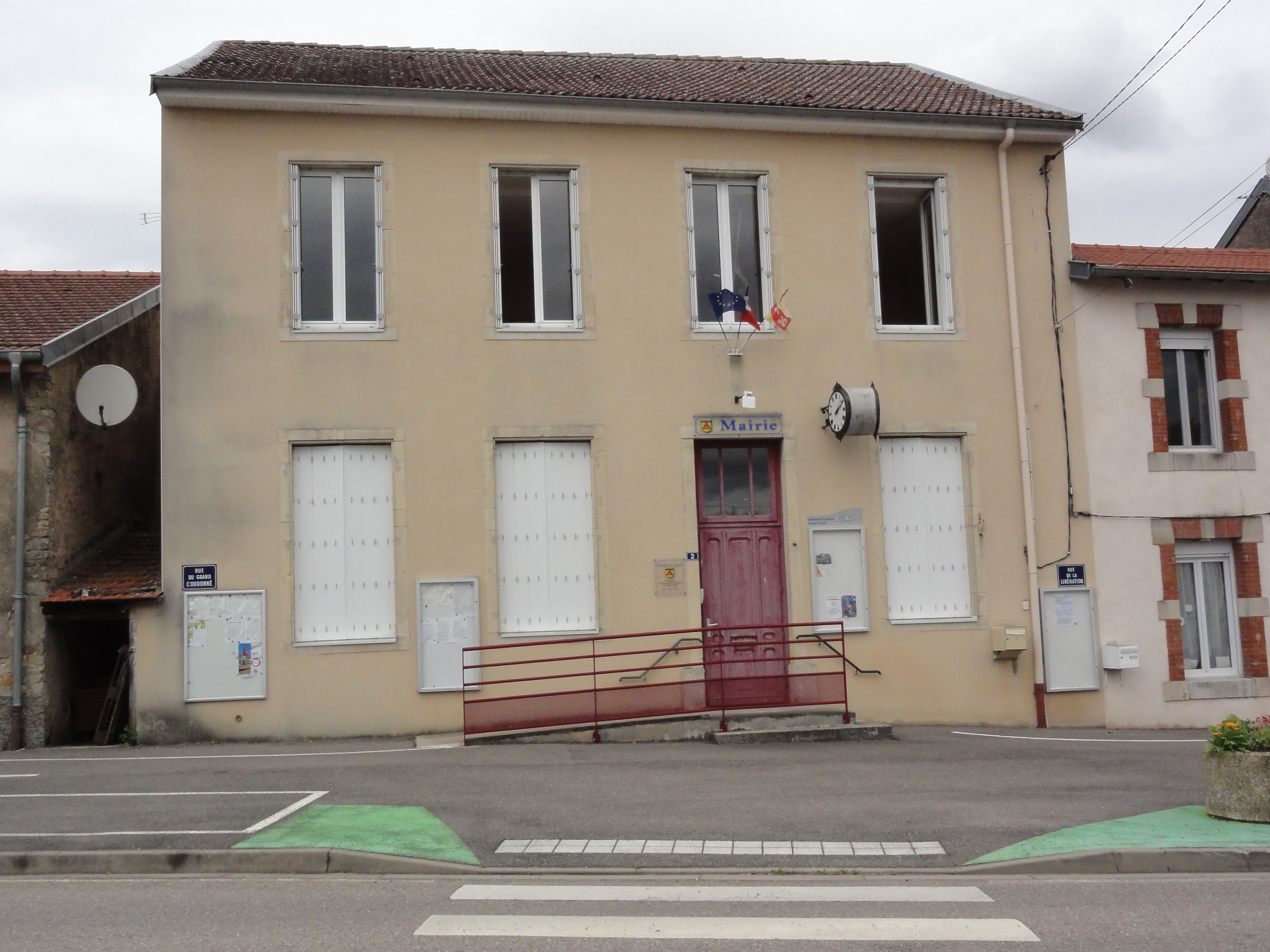
- The town hall in Erbéviller-sur-Amezule

- Coat of arms
- Location of Erbéviller-sur-Amezule
- Location within France Location within Grand Est
- Coordinates: 48°43′51″N 6°23′10″E
- Country: France
- Region: Grand Est
- Department: Meurthe-et-Moselle
- Arrondissement: Nancy
- Canton: Grand Couronné
- Intercommunality: CC Seille et Grand Couronné

Government
  - Mayor (2020–2026): Claude Renaud
- Area^{1}: 4.45 km^{2} (1.72 sq mi)
- Elevation: 240 m (790 ft)
- Highest elevation: 305 m (1,001 ft)
- Lowest elevation: 238 m (781 ft)
- Population (2023): 68
  - Density: 15/km^{2} (40/sq mi)
- Time zone: UTC+01:00 (CET)
  - Summer (DST): UTC+02:00 (CEST)
- INSEE/Postal code: 54180 /54280
- ^{1} French Land Register data, which excludes lakes, ponds, glaciers > 1 km^{2} (0.386 sq mi or 247 acres) and river estuaries.

Erbéviller-sur-Amezule (French pronunciation: [ɛʁbevilɛʁ syʁ amzyl]) is a commune in the Meurthe-et-Moselle department in north-eastern France.

The commune covers an area of 4.45 km^{2} (1.72 sq mi). Claude Renaud is the mayor for the 2020-2026 tenure.

== See also ==
- Communes of the Meurthe-et-Moselle department
