= Amance, Meurthe-et-Moselle =

Amance
- Commune
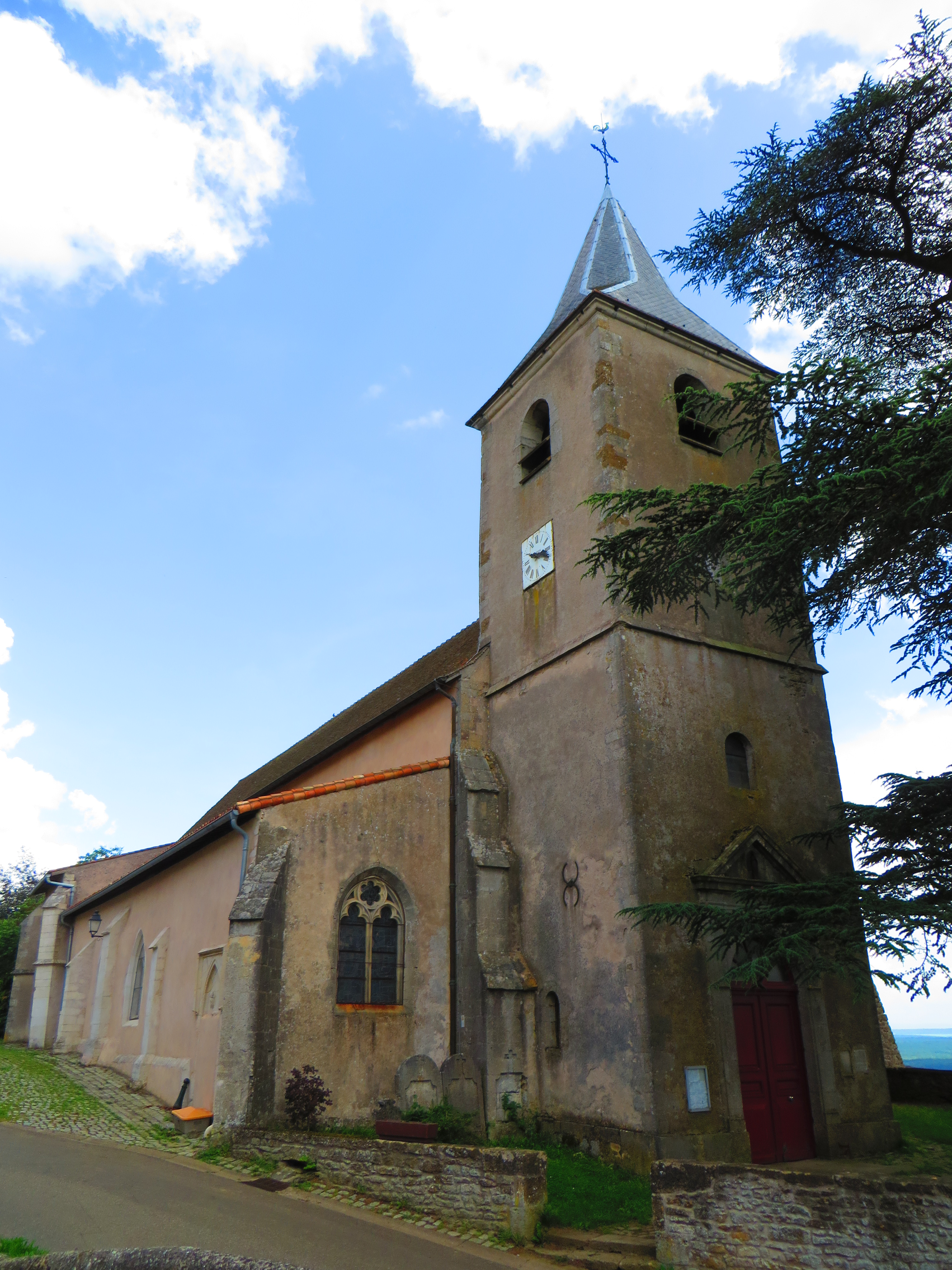
- The church in Amance

- Coat of arms
- Location of Amance
- Location within France Location within Grand Est
- Coordinates: 48°45′18″N 6°16′50″E
- Country: France
- Region: Grand Est
- Department: Meurthe-et-Moselle
- Arrondissement: Nancy
- Canton: Grand Couronné
- Intercommunality: Seille et Grand Couronné

Government
  - Mayor (2023–2026): Olivier Salve
- Area^{1}: 13.5 km^{2} (5.2 sq mi)
- Elevation: 386 m (1,266 ft)
- Highest elevation: 405 m (1,329 ft)
- Lowest elevation: 214 m (702 ft)
- Population (2023): 365
  - Density: 27.0/km^{2} (70.0/sq mi)
- Time zone: UTC+01:00 (CET)
  - Summer (DST): UTC+02:00 (CEST)
- INSEE/Postal code: 54012 /54770
- ^{1} French Land Register data, which excludes lakes, ponds, glaciers > 1 km^{2} (0.386 sq mi or 247 acres) and river estuaries.

Amance (French pronunciation: [amɑ̃s]) is a commune in the Meurthe-et-Moselle department in northeastern France. The commune covers an area of 13.5 km^{2} (5.2 sq mi).

== Population ==
Historical population
Year	Pop.	±% p.a.
1968	304	—
1975	319	+0.69%
1982	329	+0.44%
1990	312	−0.66%
1999	296	−0.58%
2007	332	+1.45%
2012	332	+0.00%
2017	340	+0.48%
2023	365	+1.19%
Source: INSEE

== See also ==
- Communes of the Meurthe-et-Moselle department
