= Laneuveville-devant-Nancy =

- Commune
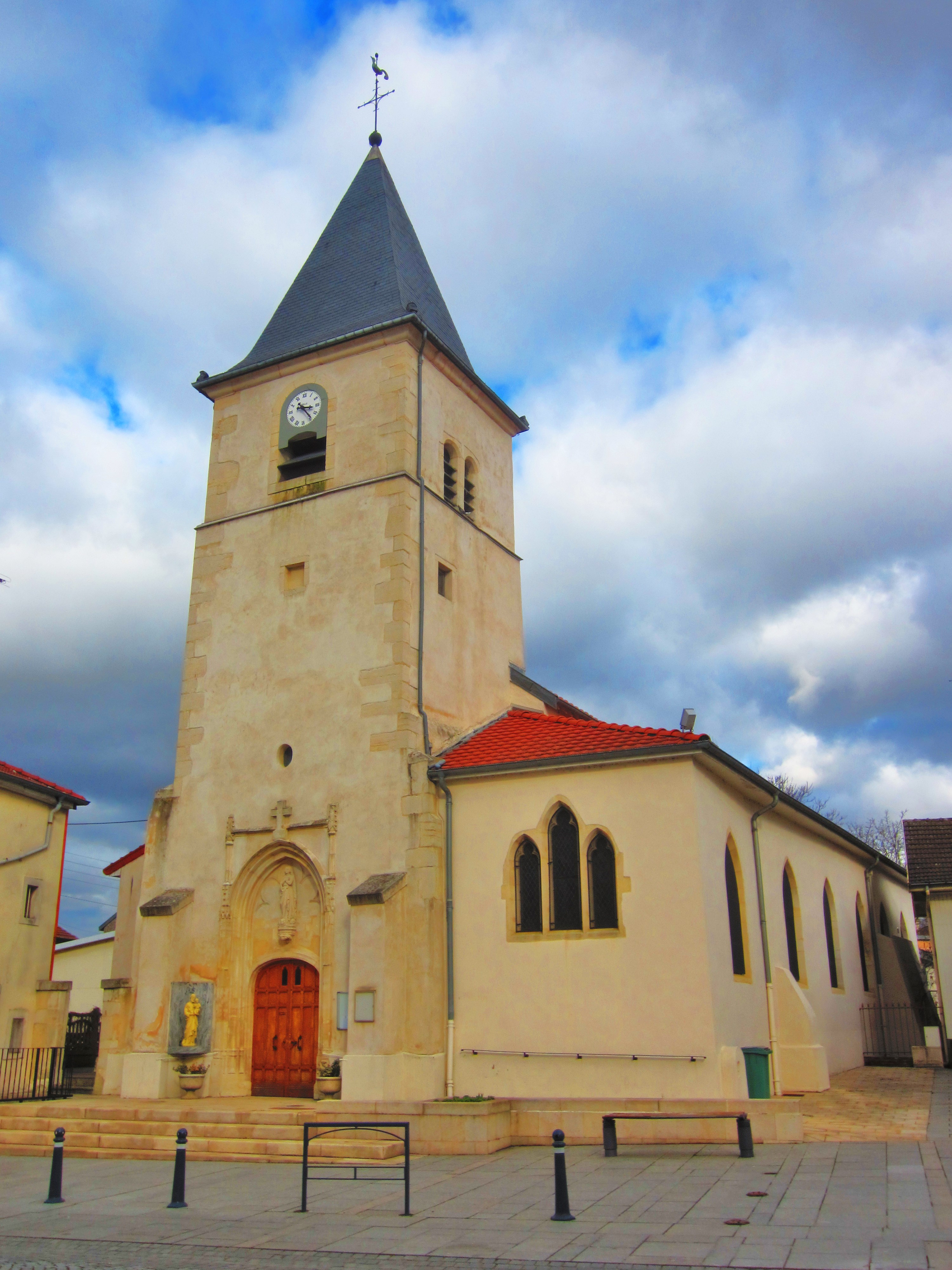
- The church in Laneuveville-devant-Nancy

- Coat of arms
- Location of Laneuveville-devant-Nancy
- Location within France Location within Grand Est
- Coordinates: 48°39′21″N 6°13′55″E
- Country: France
- Region: Grand Est
- Department: Meurthe-et-Moselle
- Arrondissement: Nancy
- Canton: Grand Couronné
- Intercommunality: Métropole du Grand Nancy

Government
  - Mayor (2020–2026): Eric da Cunha
- Area^{1}: 12.47 km^{2} (4.81 sq mi)
- Elevation: 215 m (705 ft)
- Highest elevation: 258 m (846 ft)
- Lowest elevation: 195 m (640 ft)
- Population (2023): 6,630
  - Density: 532/km^{2} (1,380/sq mi)
- Time zone: UTC+01:00 (CET)
  - Summer (DST): UTC+02:00 (CEST)
- INSEE/Postal code: 54300 /54410
- ^{1} French Land Register data, which excludes lakes, ponds, glaciers > 1 km^{2} (0.386 sq mi or 247 acres) and river estuaries.

Laneuveville-devant-Nancy (French pronunciation: [lanœvvil dəvɑ̃ nɑ̃si], literally Laneuveville before Nancy) is a commune in the Meurthe-et-Moselle department in north-eastern France, which includes the former commune of La Madeleine, notable for manufacturing terra sigillata Ancient Roman pottery.

The commune covers an area of 12.47 km² (4.81 sq mi). Eric da Cunha is the mayor for the 2020-2026 tenure.

== Population ==
Historical population
| Year | Pop. | ±% p.a. |
|---|---|---|
| 1968 | 4,896 | — |
| 1975 | 5,059 | +0.47% |
| 1982 | 5,114 | +0.15% |
| 1990 | 4,912 | −0.50% |
| 1999 | 5,083 | +0.38% |
| 2007 | 5,903 | +1.89% |
| 2012 | 5,963 | +0.20% |
| 2017 | 6,541 | +1.87% |
| 2023 | 6,630 | +0.23% |
Source: INSEE

== See also ==
- Communes of the Meurthe-et-Moselle department
