= Art-sur-Meurthe =

- Commune
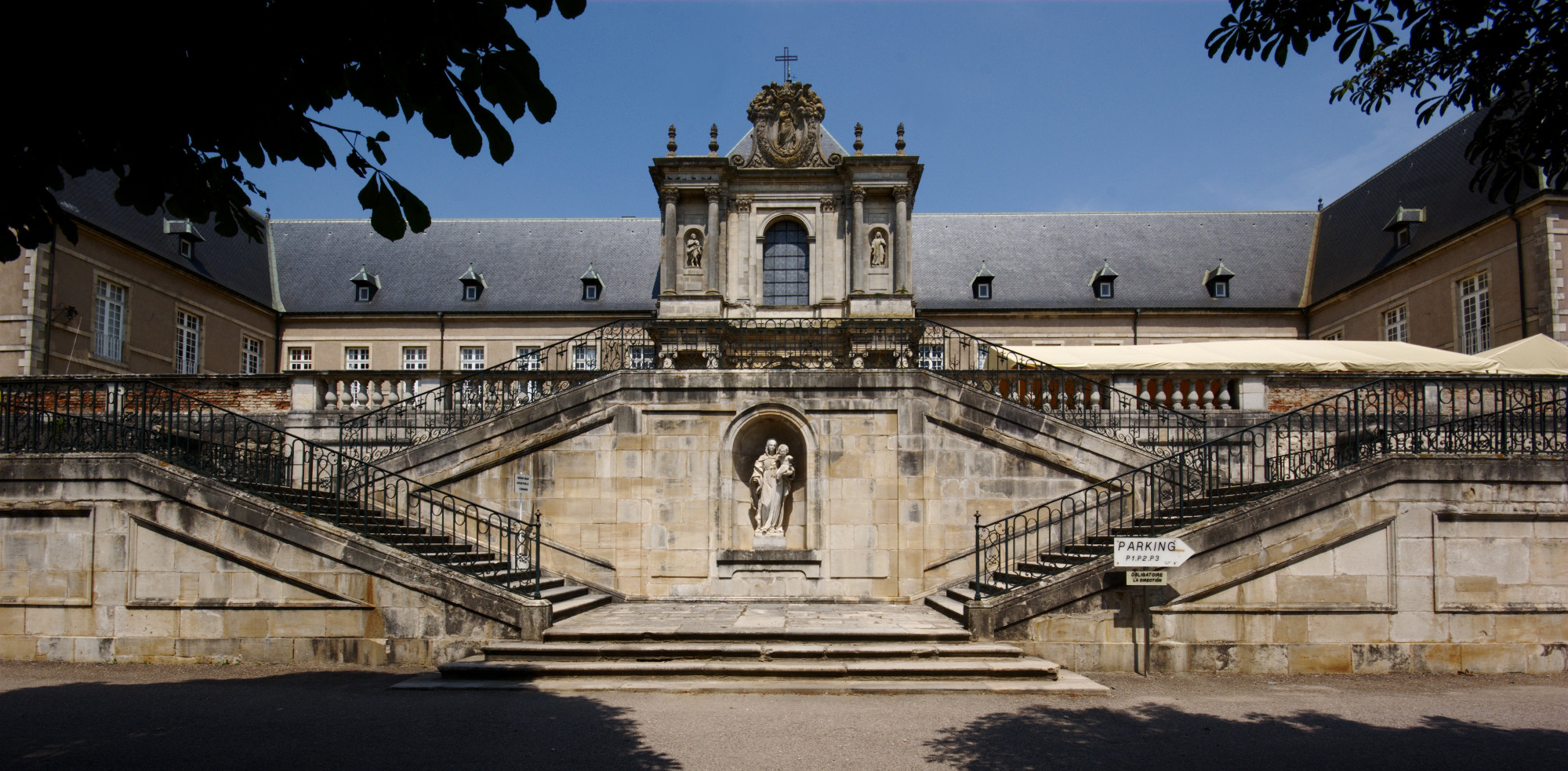
- The charterhouse of Bosserville

- Coat of arms
- Location of Art-sur-Meurthe
- Location within France Location within Grand Est
- Coordinates: 48°39′24″N 6°15′58″E
- Country: France
- Region: Grand Est
- Department: Meurthe-et-Moselle
- Arrondissement: Nancy
- Canton: Grand Couronné
- Intercommunality: Métropole Grand Nancy

Government
  - Mayor (2020–2026): Jean-Pierre Dessein
- Area^{1}: 11.47 km^{2} (4.43 sq mi)
- Elevation: 225 m (738 ft)
- Highest elevation: 268 m (879 ft)
- Lowest elevation: 195 m (640 ft)
- Population (2023): 1,700
  - Density: 150/km^{2} (380/sq mi)
- Time zone: UTC+01:00 (CET)
  - Summer (DST): UTC+02:00 (CEST)
- INSEE/Postal code: 54025 /54510
- ^{1} French Land Register data, which excludes lakes, ponds, glaciers > 1 km^{2} (0.386 sq mi or 247 acres) and river estuaries.

Art-sur-Meurthe (French pronunciation: [aʁ syʁ mœʁt], literally Art on Meurthe) is a commune in the Meurthe-et-Moselle department in northeastern France.

The commune covers an area of 11.47 km² (4.43 sq mi). The current mayor is Jean-Pierre Dessein.

== Population ==
Historical population
Year	Pop.	±% p.a.
1968	849	—
1975	799	−0.86%
1982	814	+0.27%
1990	994	+2.53%
1999	1,109	+1.22%
2007	1,289	+1.90%
2012	1,251	−0.60%
2017	1,470	+3.28%
2023	1,700	+2.45%
Source: INSEE

In the past, inhabitants of Art-sur-Meurthe were known by their neighbours as haut-la-queue ("hoity-toitys").

== See also ==
- Communes of the Meurthe-et-Moselle department
