= Réméréville =

- Commune
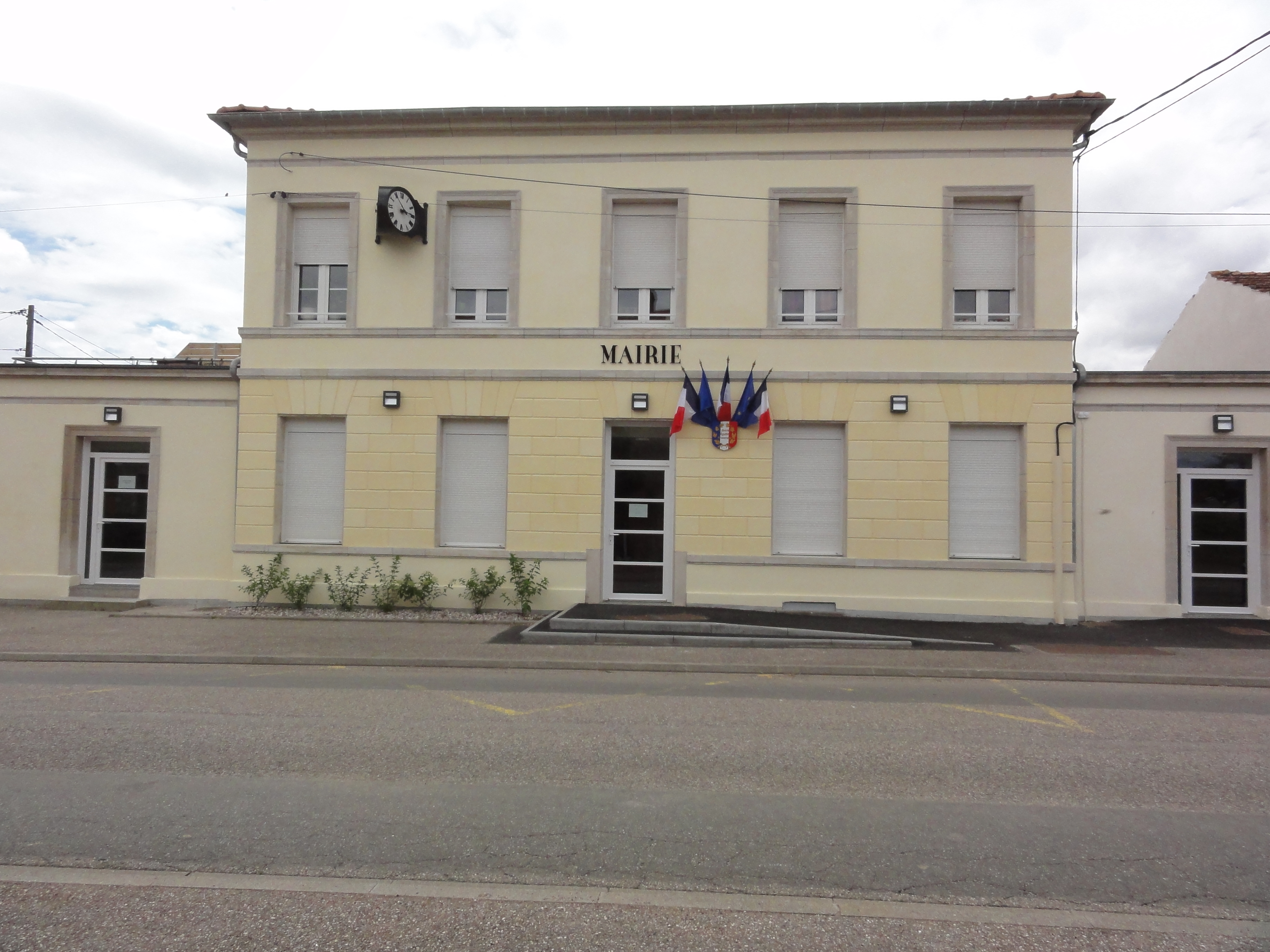
- The town hall in Réméréville

- Coat of arms
- Location of Réméréville
- Location within France Location within Grand Est
- Coordinates: 48°42′19″N 6°23′24″E
- Country: France
- Region: Grand Est
- Department: Meurthe-et-Moselle
- Arrondissement: Nancy
- Canton: Grand Couronné
- Intercommunality: Seille et Grand Couronné

Government
  - Mayor (2020–2026): Dominique Mouginet
- Area^{1}: 13.46 km^{2} (5.20 sq mi)
- Elevation: 230 m (750 ft)
- Highest elevation: 304 m (997 ft)
- Lowest elevation: 218 m (715 ft)
- Population (2023): 648
  - Density: 48.1/km^{2} (125/sq mi)
- Time zone: UTC+01:00 (CET)
  - Summer (DST): UTC+02:00 (CEST)
- INSEE/Postal code: 54456 /54110
- ^{1} French Land Register data, which excludes lakes, ponds, glaciers > 1 km^{2} (0.386 sq mi or 247 acres) and river estuaries.

Réméréville (French pronunciation: [ʁemeʁevil]) is a commune in the Meurthe-et-Moselle department in north-eastern France.

The commune covers an area of 13.46 km^{2} (5.20 sq mi). The current mayor is Dominique Mouginet.

== See also ==
- Communes of the Meurthe-et-Moselle department
