= Canton of Saint-Nicolas-de-Port =

Former canton in Meurthe-et-Moselle, France

Coordinates: 48°37′12″N 6°15′15″E

- Former canton
- Location of the canton in the arrondissement of Nancy
- Country: France
- Region: Grand Est
- Department: Meurthe-et-Moselle
- No. of communes: {{{nbcomm}}}
- Disbanded: 2015

Government
  - Representatives: Jean-Claude Pissenem
- Area: 132.52 km^{2} (51.17 sq mi)
- Population (2012): 27,733
  - Density: 209.27/km^{2} (542.02/sq mi)

The canton of Saint-Nicolas-de-Port (French: Canton de Saint-Nicolas-de-Port) is a former French canton located in the department of Meurthe-et-Moselle in the Lorraine region (now part of Grand Est). This canton was organized around Saint-Nicolas-de-Port in the arrondissement of Nancy. It is now part of the canton of Jarville-la-Malgrange.

The last general councillor from this canton was Jean-Claude Pissenem (PS), elected in 2004.

== Composition ==
The canton of Saint-Nicolas-de-Port grouped together 14 municipalities and had 27,733 inhabitants (2012 census without double counts).

1. Azelot
2. Burthecourt-aux-Chênes
3. Coyviller
4. Dombasle-sur-Meurthe
5. Ferrières
6. Flavigny-sur-Moselle
7. Lupcourt
8. Manoncourt-en-Vermois
9. Richardménil
10. Rosières-aux-Salines
11. Saffais
12. Saint-Nicolas-de-Port
13. Tonnoy
14. Ville-en-Vermois
