= Basilica of Saint-Nicolas, Saint-Nicolas-de-Port =

Basilica in Saint-Nicolas-de-Port, France

Coordinates: 48°37′54″N 6°18′14″E

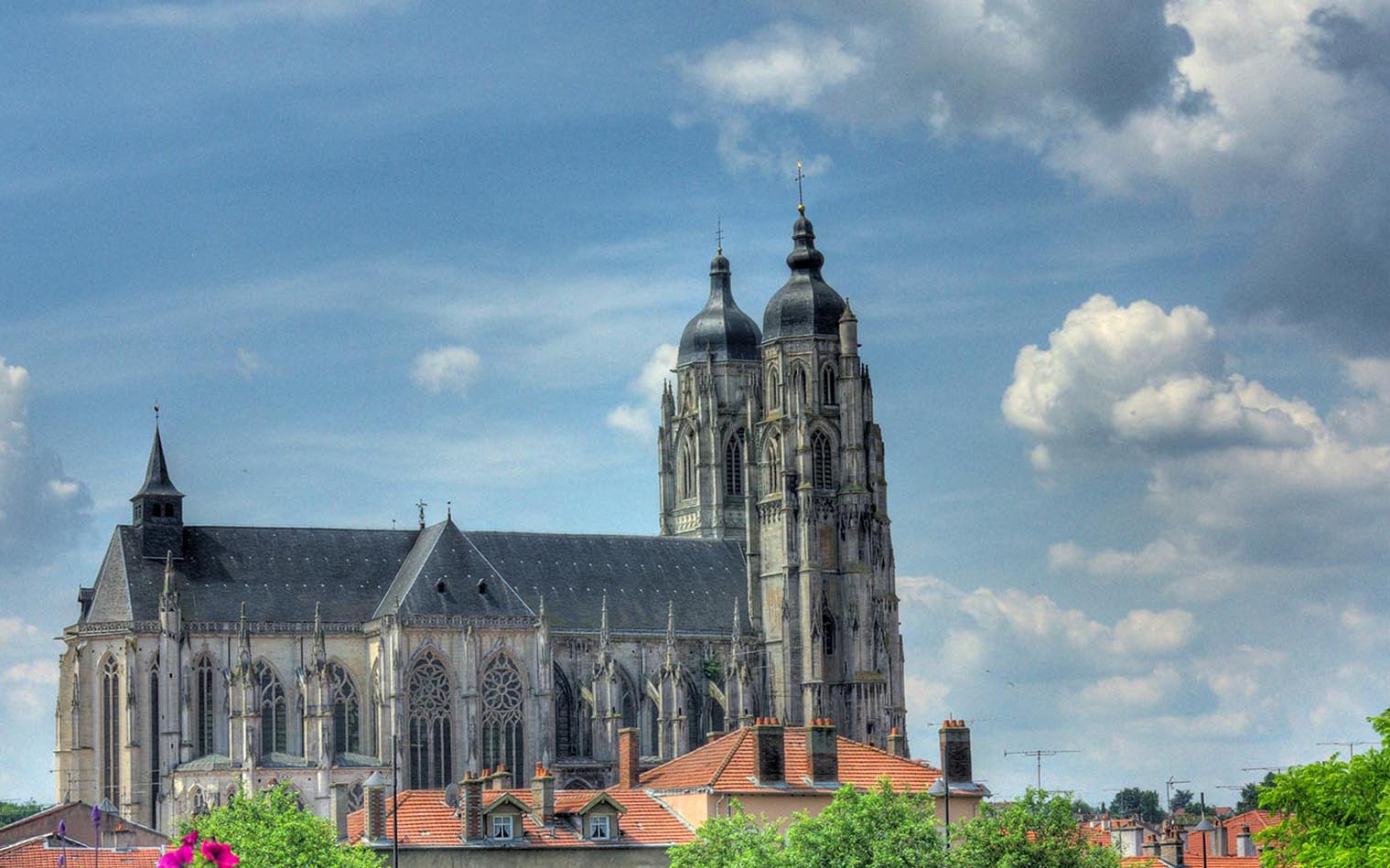
Basilique Saint-Nicolas

The Basilica of Saint Nicholas (French: Basilique Saint-Nicolas) is a minor basilica in the town of Saint-Nicolas-de-Port in Grand Est, France. It is a pilgrimage site, supposedly holding relics of Saint Nicholas brought from Italy.

== Background ==
Nicolas became the patron saint of the Duchy of Lorraine. The current basilica was built in the 15th and 16th centuries and has fine Renaissance painted glass windows by Nicolas Droguet of Lyon, Valentin Bousch of Strasbourg, Hans von Kulmbach and Veit Hirsvogel from Nuremberg, Georges Millereau and other unknown artists, as well as 19th century replacements for lost glass works. It has been a French Monument historique since 1840, and a minor basilica since 1950.
