= Houdemont =

- Commune
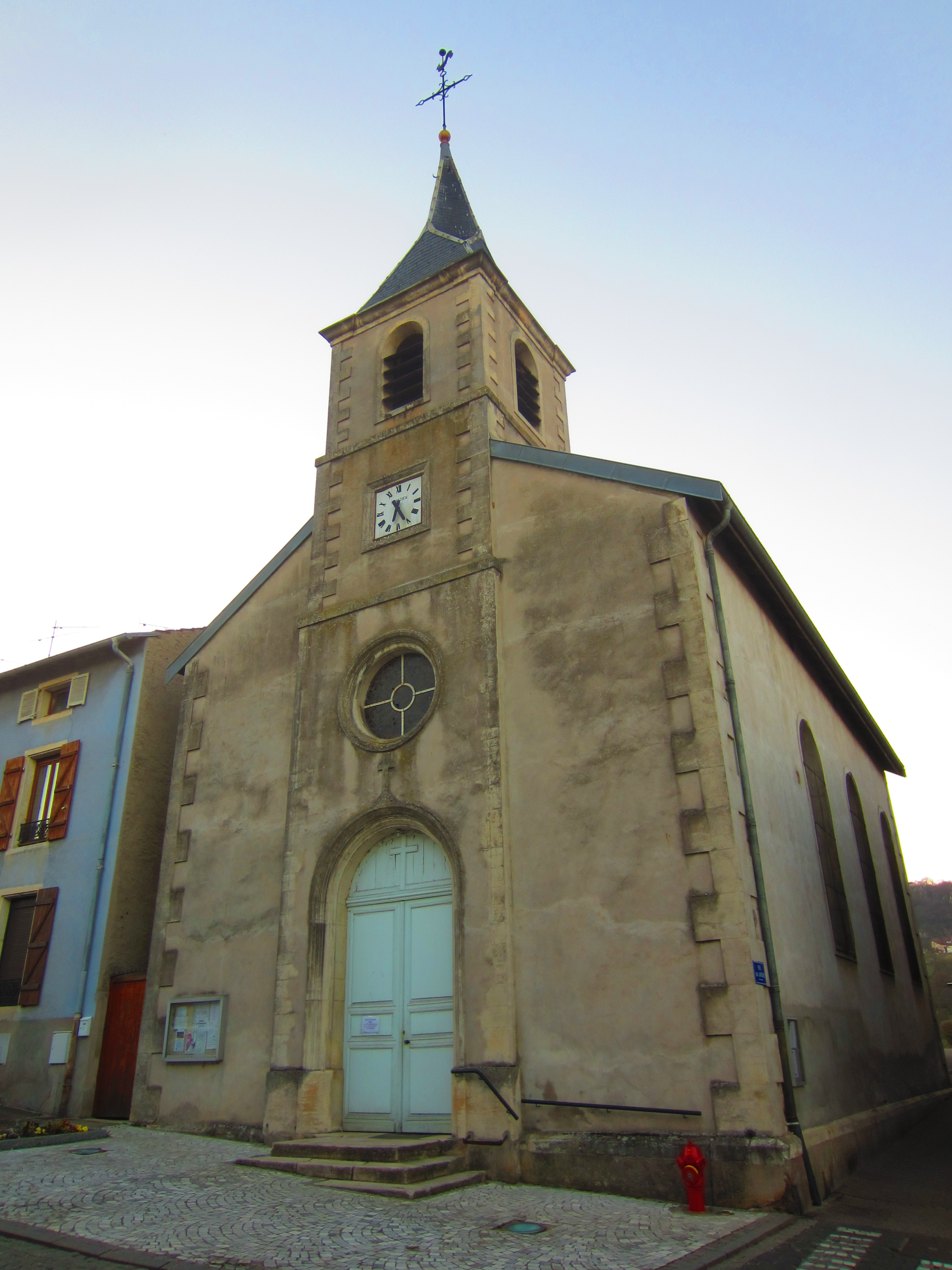
- The church in Houdemont

- Coat of arms
- Location of Houdemont
- Location within France Location within Grand Est
- Coordinates: 48°38′49″N 6°10′32″E
- Country: France
- Region: Grand Est
- Department: Meurthe-et-Moselle
- Arrondissement: Nancy
- Canton: Jarville-la-Malgrange
- Intercommunality: Métropole du Grand Nancy

Government
  - Mayor (2020–2026): Maurizio Petronio
- Area^{1}: 3.62 km^{2} (1.40 sq mi)
- Elevation: 256 m (840 ft)
- Highest elevation: 400 m (1,300 ft)
- Lowest elevation: 226 m (741 ft)
- Population (2023): 2,066
  - Density: 571/km^{2} (1,480/sq mi)
- Time zone: UTC+01:00 (CET)
  - Summer (DST): UTC+02:00 (CEST)
- INSEE/Postal code: 54265 /54180
- ^{1} French Land Register data, which excludes lakes, ponds, glaciers > 1 km^{2} (0.386 sq mi or 247 acres) and river estuaries.

Houdemont (French pronunciation: [udmɔ̃]) is a commune in the Meurthe-et-Moselle department in north-eastern France.

== Population ==
Historical population
Year	Pop.	±% p.a.
1968	870	—
1975	870	+0.00%
1982	1,553	+8.63%
1990	1,836	+2.11%
1999	2,375	+2.90%
2007	2,469	+0.49%
2012	2,301	−1.40%
2017	2,108	−1.74%
2023	2,066	−0.33%
Source: INSEE

== See also ==
- Communes of the Meurthe-et-Moselle department
