= Valentin Bousch =

French painter

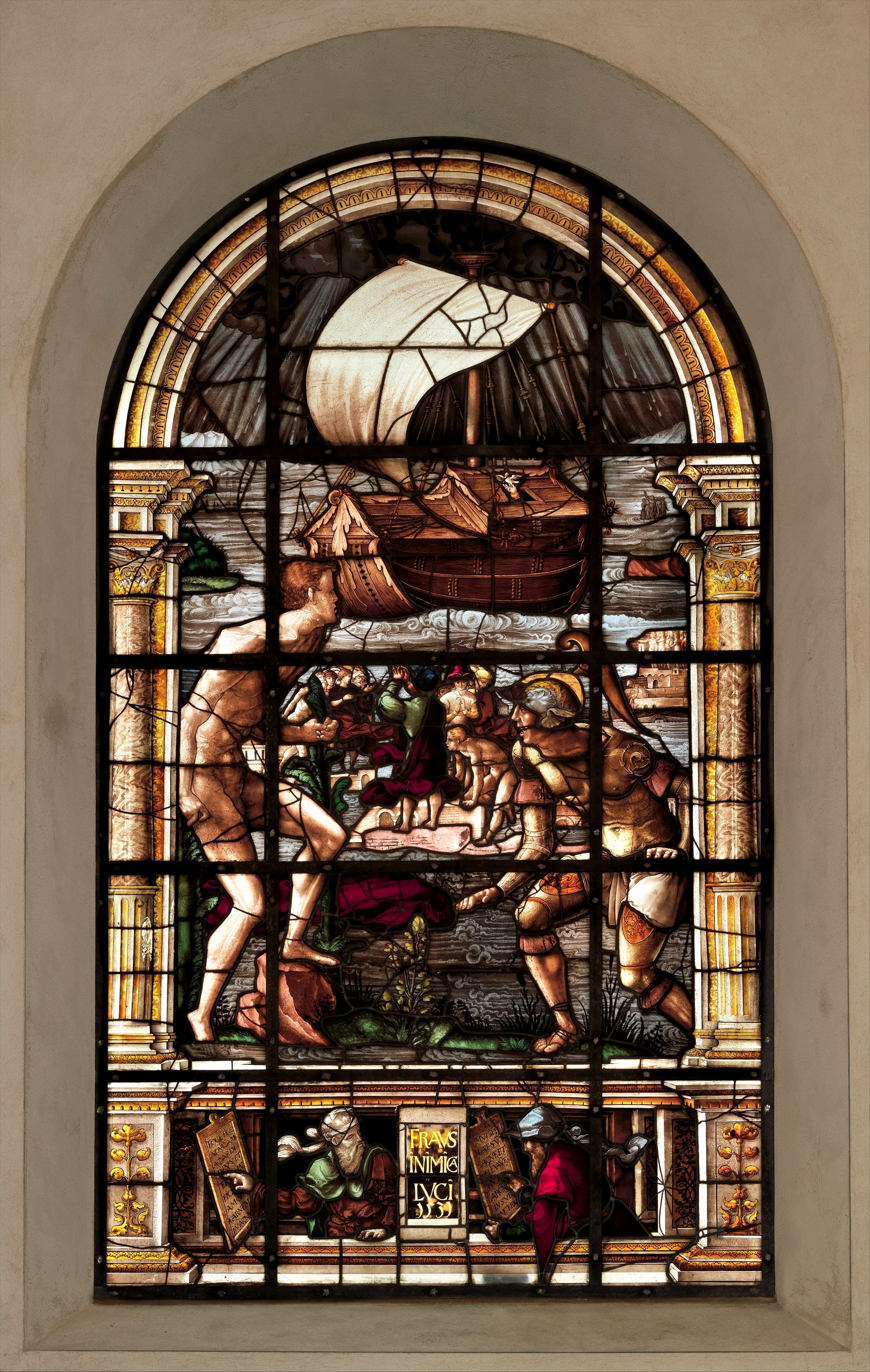
″The Deluge″ by Valentin Bousch, 1531. Glass, painted and stained. 11 ft. 10 1/4 in. x 5 ft. 7 in. Metropolitan Museum of Art.

Valentin Bousch (circa 1490 – August 1541) was a Renaissance stained glass glazier and painter from Strasbourg, active in the Duchy of Lorraine and the Republic of Metz. A rarity among stained glass artists, Bousch is seen as one who actively sought to express new ideas in his art, often before they were widely used in the area, revising his method even from one window to the next, to create striking Renaissance effects and a personal style.

== Life ==
Bousch was born in Strasbourg. The earliest mention of his work is at Saint-Nicolas-de-Port, near Nancy in 1514. Bousch was active there from 1514 to 1520, developed a large glass studio and made many windows for the Saint Nicolas basilica. In 1518 he also made windows for the priory church of Varangéville on a command of the Bishop of Metz, John IV of Lorraine. On 25 September 1518, Valentin Bousch became the master glazier of the cathedral of Metz, where most work was done in the years 1520-1528, and 1534-1539. In between, he made a cycle of biblical scenes for the Saint-Firmin priory church in Flavigny-sur-Moselle. A number of documents relating to Bousch, including his will are at the Bibliothèque municipale de Nancy.

== Work ==
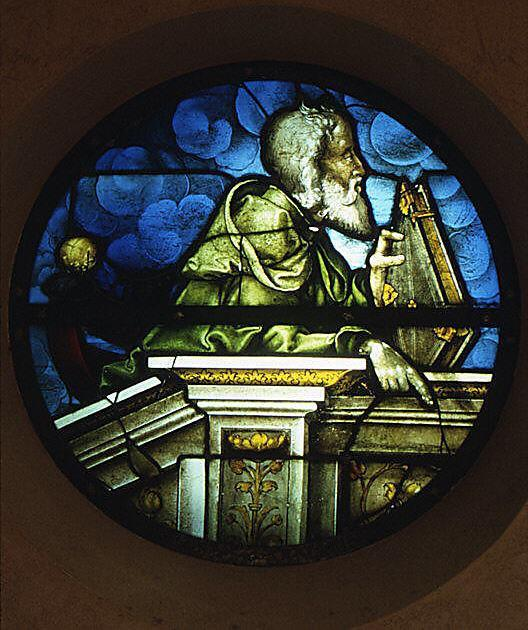
Glass-stained "The Prophet Moses" by Valentin Bousch,1533. Diam. 32 in. (81.3 cm.) Lorraine, Metz. Gift of Joseph Pulitzer Bequest to Metropolitan Museum, 1917

Examples of his skills are still in place in the Saint-Nicolas-de-Port Basilica, and the Metz Cathedral. In addition, Bousch made several stained glass windows commissioned by the bourgeoisie of Metz for churches, hotels and chapels in the Lorraine countryside. A work attributed to his pupil, from 1548, is in the church of Saint Marcel, Ennery, Moselle.

=== Saint-Nicolas-de-Port ===
In Saint-Nicolas-de-Port, much of the glass had not survived the Thirty Years' War and later events, and other parts are rearranged. Yet Bousch is attributed with the great rose window, and some windows, in full or part, in the small chapels. The repetitions, as well as some uncertain attributions, are explained by the fact that works were mostly commissioned by donors, and were no part of an overall design of the church.

In the Chapelle Notre Dame des Victoires: The Dormition of Mary, her funeral and her Assumption; and in another window, the Presentation of Mary, the Visitation and the Presentation of Jesus at the Temple. In the Chapelle Saint Anne: possibly a window with the Annunciation and Saint Barbara, and another with church donors, coats of arms and Adrian of Nicomedia. In the Chapelle des saints archanges Michel, Raphaël et Gabriel – only parts. In the Chapelle Saint Vincent et Saint Fiacre, two renditions of Saint George and the Dragon, a mounted Martin of Tours giving his cloak, and a Catherine of Alexandria, in windows shared with other artists.

Two greater windows, are dedicated one to Saint Sebastian and other characters, the other mostly to the Transfiguration of Jesus, witnessed by a circle with Moses, Elijah, Saint Peter and others.

=== Metz ===
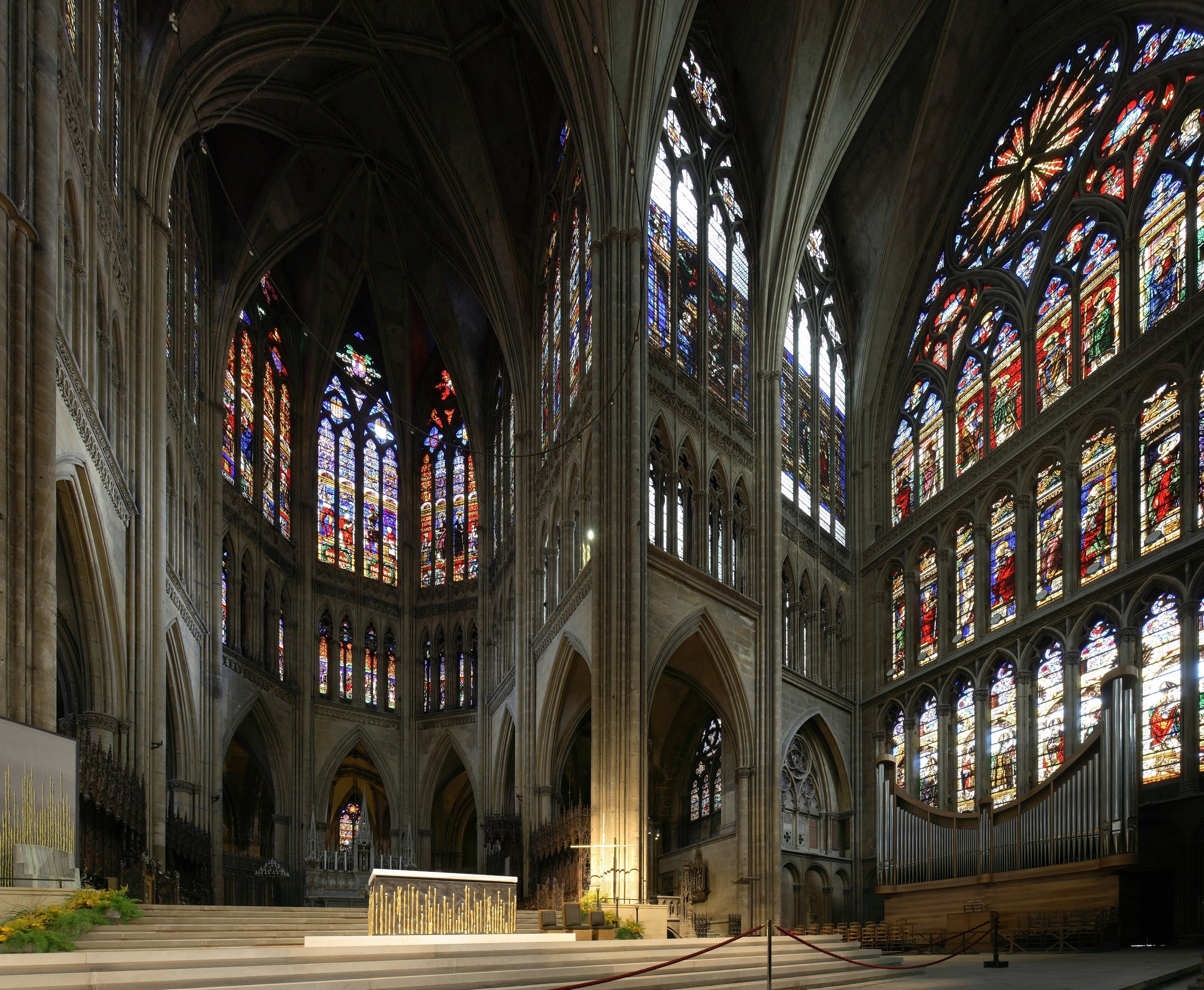
Stained glasses of the choir and south transept, cathedral of Metz

In Metz Bousch made most of the stained glasses of the choir and south transept.

=== Flavigny-sur-Moselle ===
The windows from Flavigny-sur-Moselle show Bousch's mature style. Out of a cycle of seven, three were lost by 1850, and four were sold in 1904 by the priory and are dispersed in North America. Two are in the Metropolitan Museum of Art (along with four smaller pieces), one in St. Joseph church, Stockbridge, Massachusetts and one in a private collection in Canada.

== Technique ==
As a glazier, Bousch produced large cuts of glass that were technically difficult to make, and allowed greater freedom in painting. Bousch's glasses were designed to keep each window's net of lead reinforcement lines along the picture's painted contours, so they will not interrupt the scene. At times, obvious lead lines were incorporated to emphasize an object, The more traditional method of placing lead lines in a way that help define panels, or spotlight a person's head, was used as a second choice in Bousch's work.

As a painter, Bousch utilized the large glass cuts to present rich arrays of shadows and background details, applying Grisaille color washes in modulation. The luminosity and color of his support medium came into play, as he left the brightest areas in the painting, the least matted surfaces in a glass. Illusionistic details were added to distract a viewer away from lead lines.

== Influences ==
Bousch drew ideas from a number of artistic schools and media, and adapted them to glass painting, which resulted in defying some late gothic characteristics and traditional techniques of the stained glass field. Identified early influences were Rhenish or German Renaissance artists. Some elements from Hans Baldung Grien, and Albrecht Dürer, but also Matthias Grünewald 's Isenheim Altarpiece and the elder Cranach's 1503 Crucifixion, have been paired each with a parallel detail from Bousch. He most likely studied their works from prints, but probably also knew Baldung Grien, a citizen of Strasbourg, in person. Bousch had his own experience in panel painting.

In Bousch's later work, particularly the windows of Flavigny-sur-Moselle, in addition to using these artists' works as models, Bousch introduced many novelties. Gothic decorations like foliage and damask backgrounds were minimized, replaced by neoclassical architectural frames; Generic glass panels gave way to Bousch's more advanced cutting and leading; Halos, to naturalistic light beams. Perspective was nuanced for different emotive ends, objects placed strategically in space and persons arranged in dramatic, purposeful postures, some in daring nudity. These are all signs of another layer of influences on Bousch work, that of Italian Renaissance and Mannerism. However, no direct sources of this phase are known.

On a religious dimension, his Flavigny-sur-Moselle work has also been connected with a Catholic prior's relatively sympathetic response to Protestant humanist thought; the cycle is interpreted as identifying a history of predestination within the bible.

== See also ==
- Metz Cathedral

== Sources ==
- Michel Herrold, Francis Roussel : Le vitrail en Lorraine : du XIIe au XXe siècle. Ed. Serpenoise, Metz, 1983.
- James Bugslag : Valentin Bousch’s Artistic Practice in the Stained Glass of Flavigny-sur-Moselle, Metropolitan Museum Journal, 33, 1998 (pp. 169–82). Online
- Ariane Isler-de Jongh : A Stained-Glass Window from Flavigny-sur-Moselle, Metropolitan Museum Journal, 33, 1998 (pp. 153–167). Online
- Rosewell, Roger (August 2008). "Valentin Bousch on the Bench". Vidimus. Vol. 20. ISSN 1753-0741.
- Denis Krieger, Works from the Cathedral of Metz attributed to Bousch on Flickr.
