= Ludres =

- Commune
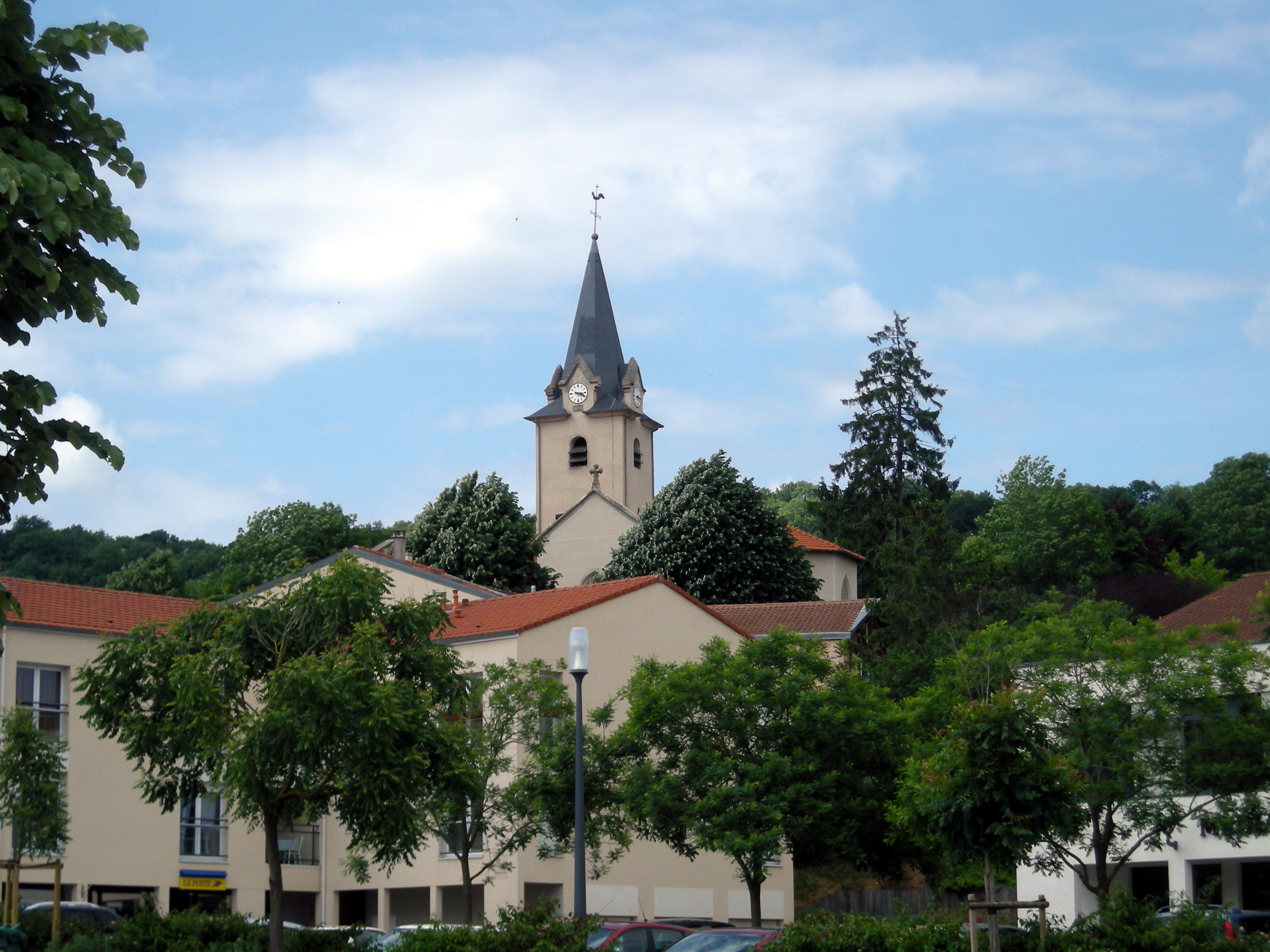
- The church in Ludres
- Location of Ludres
- Location within France Location within Grand Est
- Coordinates: 48°37′00″N 6°10′00″E
- Country: France
- Region: Grand Est
- Department: Meurthe-et-Moselle
- Arrondissement: Nancy
- Canton: Jarville-la-Malgrange
- Intercommunality: Métropole du Grand Nancy

Government
  - Mayor (2020–2026): Pierre Boileau
- Area^{1}: 8.18 km^{2} (3.16 sq mi)
- Elevation: 259 m (850 ft)
- Highest elevation: 420 m (1,380 ft)
- Lowest elevation: 237 m (778 ft)
- Population (2023): 5,843
  - Density: 714/km^{2} (1,850/sq mi)
- Time zone: UTC+01:00 (CET)
  - Summer (DST): UTC+02:00 (CEST)
- INSEE/Postal code: 54328 /54710
- ^{1} French Land Register data, which excludes lakes, ponds, glaciers > 1 km^{2} (0.386 sq mi or 247 acres) and river estuaries.

Ludres (French pronunciation: [lydʁ]) is a commune in the Meurthe-et-Moselle département in north-eastern France.

The inhabitants are called Ludréens. In the past, inhabitants of Ludres were known by their neighbours as rôtisseurs ("roast meat sellers"), having once turned out en masse to watch their adulterous priest burned at the stake.

== Population ==
Historical population
Year	Pop.	±% p.a.
1968	1,239	—
1975	1,582	+3.55%
1982	5,376	+19.09%
1990	6,236	+1.87%
1999	6,821	+1.00%
2007	6,680	−0.26%
2012	6,519	−0.49%
2017	6,216	−0.95%
2023	5,843	−1.03%
Source: INSEE

== Twin towns ==
Ludres is twinned with:

- Furth im Wald, Germany
- Furth bei Göttweig, Austria
- Domažlice, Czech Republic

== See also ==
- Communes of the Meurthe-et-Moselle department
