= Burthecourt-aux-Chênes =

- Commune
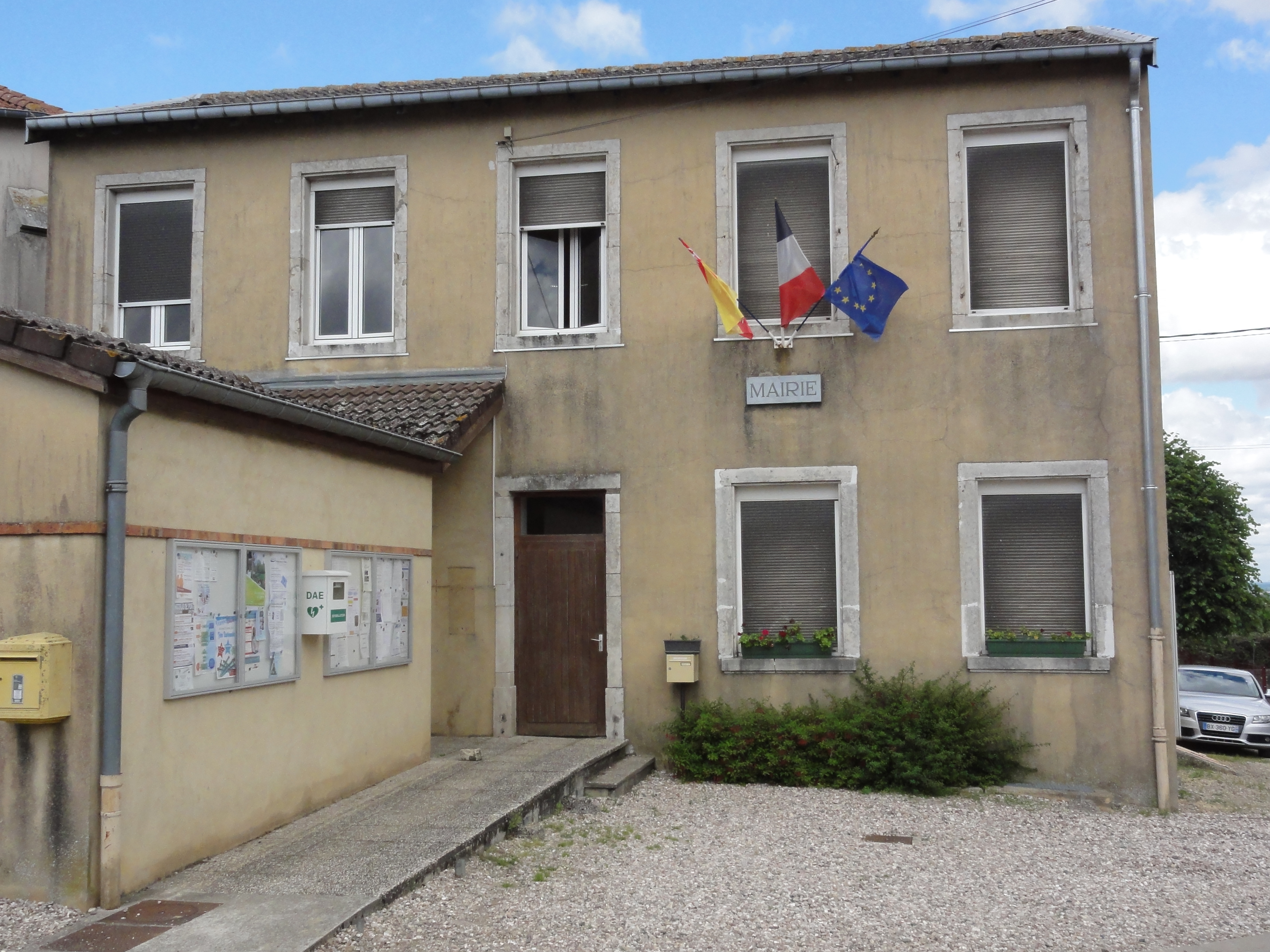
- The town hall in Burthecourt-aux-Chênes

- Coat of arms
- Location of Burthecourt-aux-Chênes
- Location within France Location within Grand Est
- Coordinates: 48°35′09″N 6°15′00″E
- Country: France
- Region: Grand Est
- Department: Meurthe-et-Moselle
- Arrondissement: Nancy
- Canton: Jarville-la-Malgrange
- Intercommunality: Pays du Sel et du Vermois

Government
  - Mayor (2020–2026): Colette Colin
- Area^{1}: 5.59 km^{2} (2.16 sq mi)
- Elevation: 310 m (1,020 ft)
- Highest elevation: 350 m (1,150 ft)
- Lowest elevation: 228 m (748 ft)
- Population (2023): 151
  - Density: 27.0/km^{2} (70.0/sq mi)
- Time zone: UTC+01:00 (CET)
  - Summer (DST): UTC+02:00 (CEST)
- INSEE/Postal code: 54108 /54210
- ^{1} French Land Register data, which excludes lakes, ponds, glaciers > 1 km^{2} (0.386 sq mi or 247 acres) and river estuaries.

Burthecourt-aux-Chênes (French pronunciation: [byʁt(ə)kuʁ o ʃɛːn]) is a commune in the Meurthe-et-Moselle department in northeastern France.

== Population ==
Historical population
Year	Pop.	±% p.a.
1968	106	—
1975	116	+1.30%
1982	112	−0.50%
1990	109	−0.34%
1999	101	−0.84%
2007	96	−0.63%
2012	96	+0.00%
2017	113	+3.31%
2023	151	+4.95%
Source: INSEE

== Politics and administration ==
List of successive mayors
Start	End	Name
1989	2008	Maurice Dartoy
2008	2015	Daniel Colin
2015	2020	Véronique Huchot
2020	current	Colette Colin

== See also ==
- Communes of the Meurthe-et-Moselle department
