= Lupcourt =

- Commune
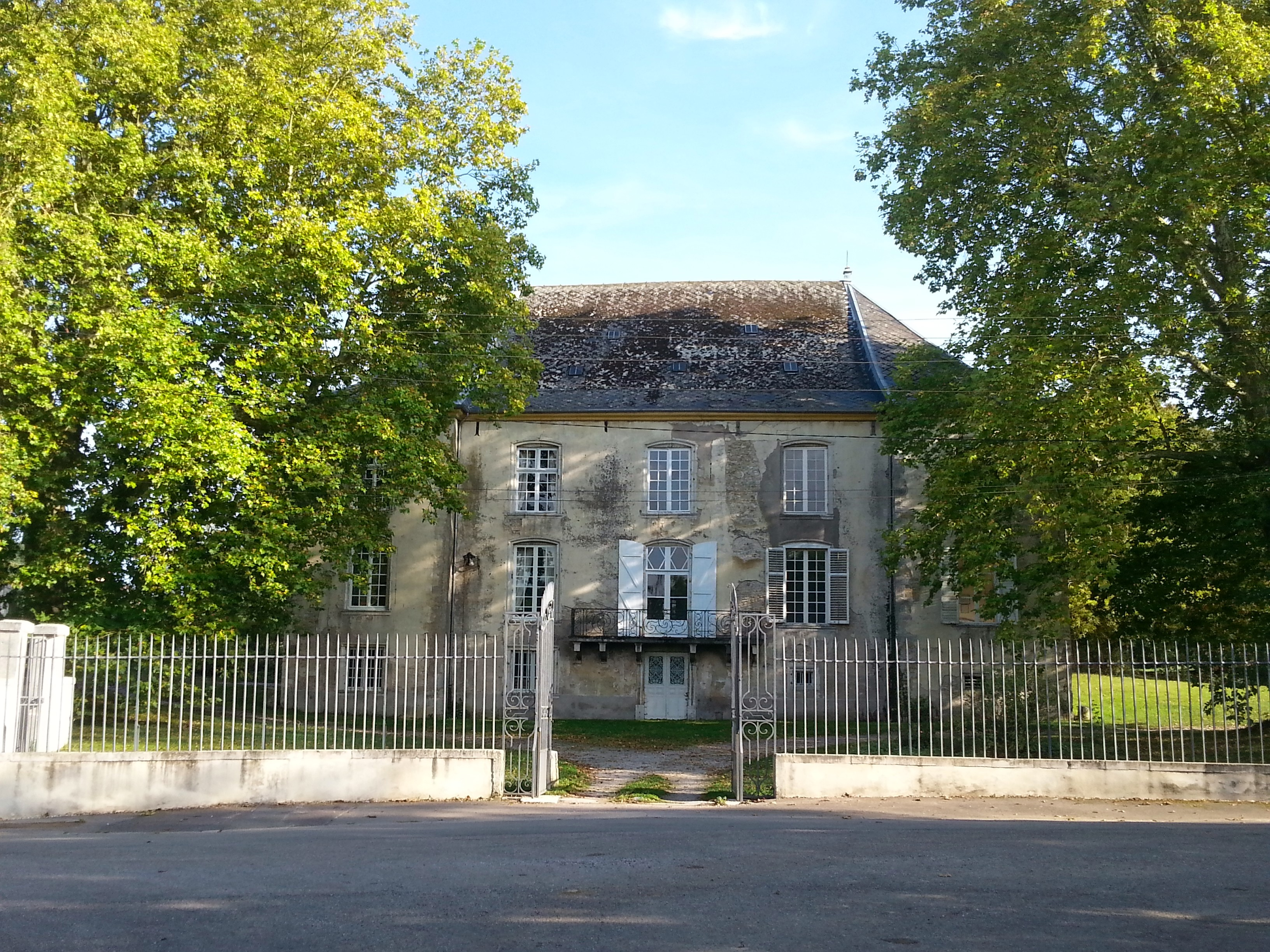
- The chateau in Lupcourt

- Coat of arms
- Location of Lupcourt
- Location within France Location within Grand Est
- Coordinates: 48°36′43″N 6°14′10″E
- Country: France
- Region: Grand Est
- Department: Meurthe-et-Moselle
- Arrondissement: Nancy
- Canton: Jarville-la-Malgrange
- Intercommunality: Pays du Sel et du Vermois

Government
  - Mayor (2023–2026): Jean-François Stemetz
- Area^{1}: 6.94 km^{2} (2.68 sq mi)
- Elevation: 245 m (804 ft)
- Highest elevation: 322 m (1,056 ft)
- Lowest elevation: 226 m (741 ft)
- Population (2023): 428
  - Density: 61.7/km^{2} (160/sq mi)
- Time zone: UTC+01:00 (CET)
  - Summer (DST): UTC+02:00 (CEST)
- INSEE/Postal code: 54330 /54210
- ^{1} French Land Register data, which excludes lakes, ponds, glaciers > 1 km^{2} (0.386 sq mi or 247 acres) and river estuaries.

Lupcourt (French pronunciation: [lypkuʁ]) is a commune in the Meurthe-et-Moselle department in north-eastern France.

== See also ==
- Communes of the Meurthe-et-Moselle department
