= Manoncourt-en-Vermois =

- Commune
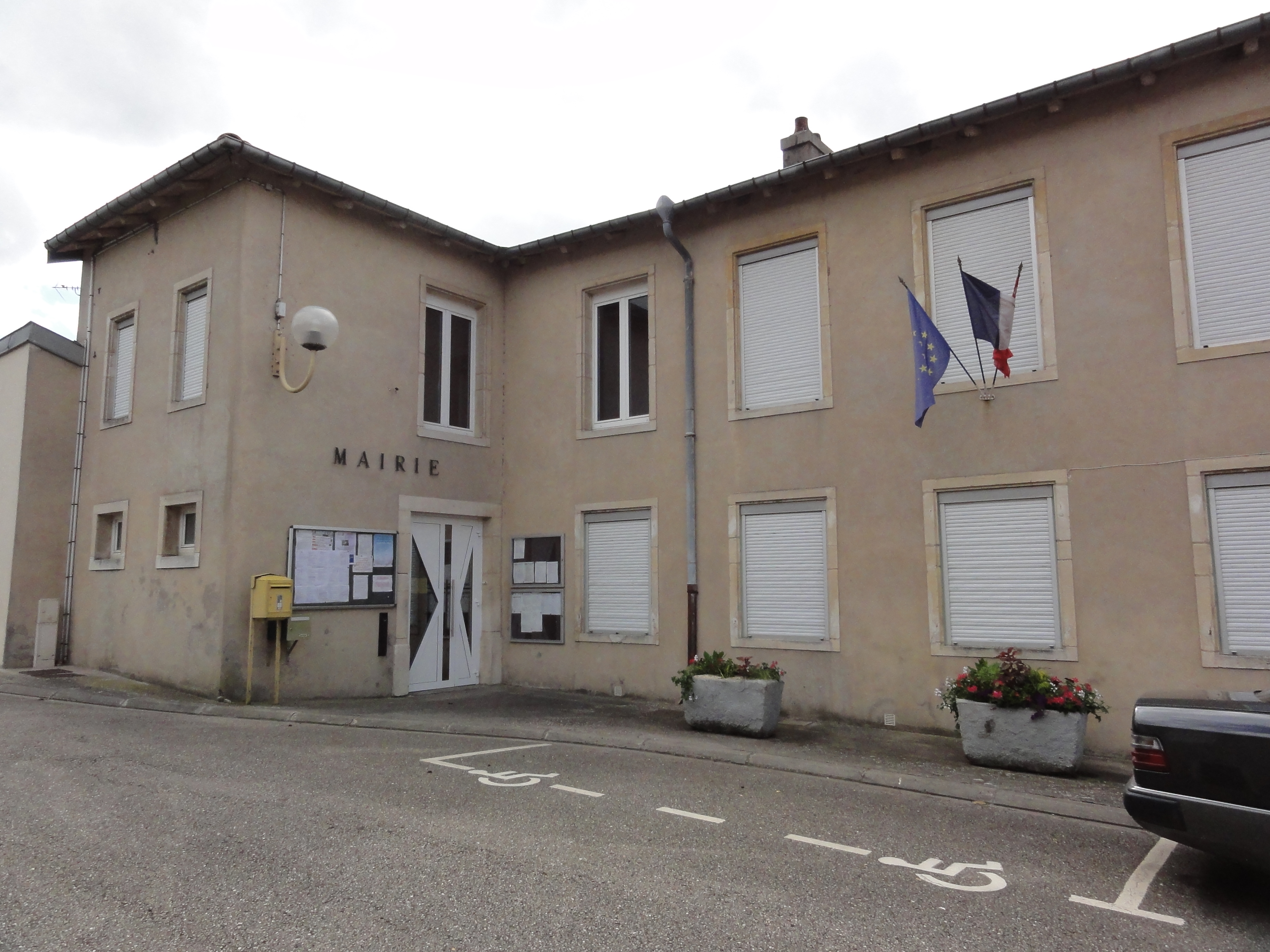
- The town hall in Manoncourt-en-Vermois

- Coat of arms
- Location of Manoncourt-en-Vermois
- Location within France Location within Grand Est
- Coordinates: 48°36′06″N 6°16′02″E
- Country: France
- Region: Grand Est
- Department: Meurthe-et-Moselle
- Arrondissement: Nancy
- Canton: Jarville-la-Malgrange
- Intercommunality: CC des Pays du Sel et du Vermois

Government
  - Mayor (2020–2026): Rachel Pascal
- Area^{1}: 6.68 km^{2} (2.58 sq mi)
- Elevation: 280 m (920 ft)
- Highest elevation: 335 m (1,099 ft)
- Lowest elevation: 231 m (758 ft)
- Population (2023): 345
  - Density: 51.6/km^{2} (134/sq mi)
- Time zone: UTC+01:00 (CET)
  - Summer (DST): UTC+02:00 (CEST)
- INSEE/Postal code: 54345 /54210
- ^{1} French Land Register data, which excludes lakes, ponds, glaciers > 1 km^{2} (0.386 sq mi or 247 acres) and river estuaries.

Manoncourt-en-Vermois (French pronunciation: [manɔ̃kuʁ ɑ̃ vɛʁmwa]) is a commune in the Meurthe-et-Moselle department in north-eastern France.

== See also ==
- Communes of the Meurthe-et-Moselle department
