= Ville-en-Vermois =

- Commune
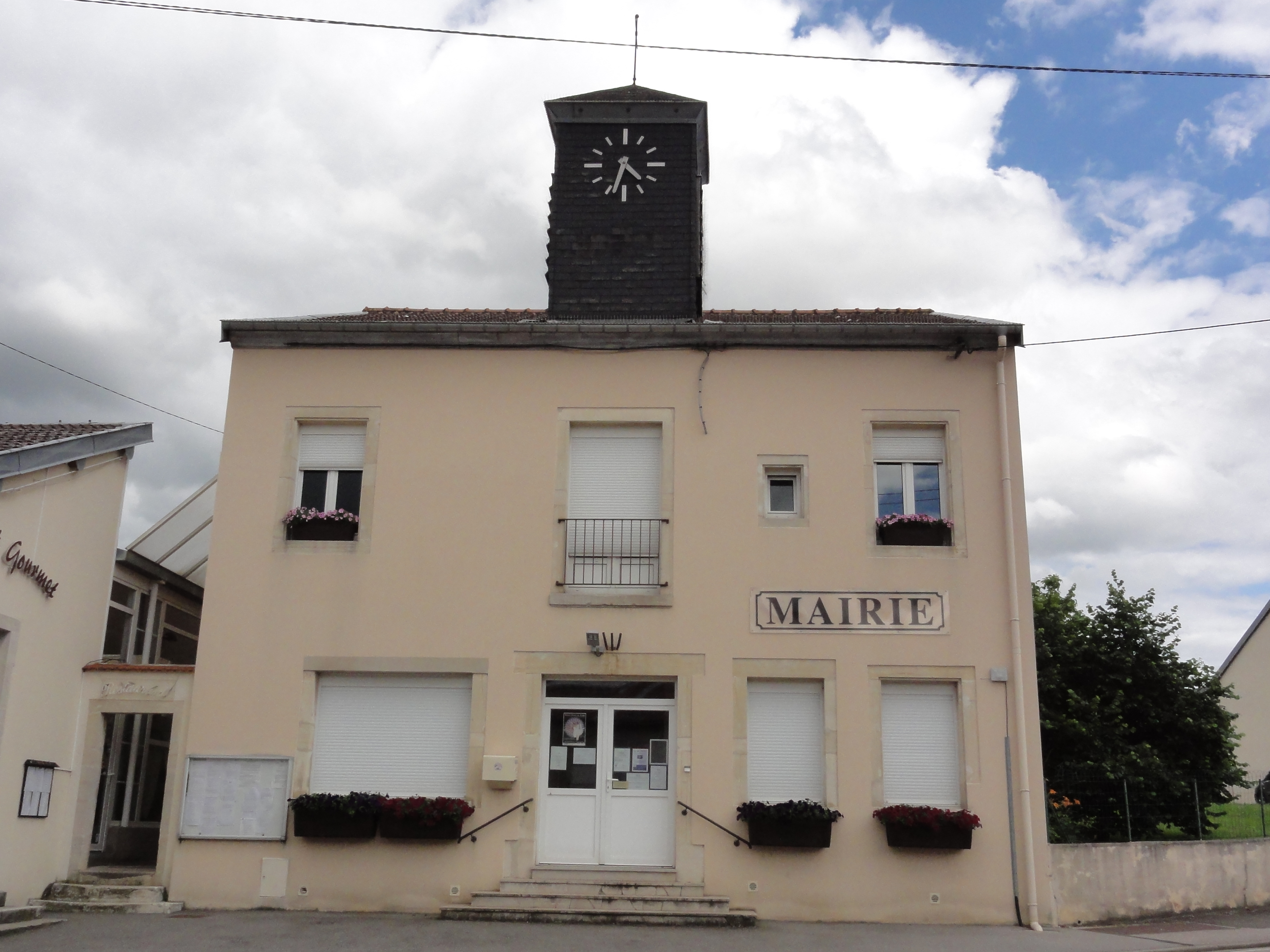
- The town hall in Ville-en-Vermois

- Coat of arms
- Location of Ville-en-Vermois
- Location within France Location within Grand Est
- Coordinates: 48°36′54″N 6°15′17″E
- Country: France
- Region: Grand Est
- Department: Meurthe-et-Moselle
- Arrondissement: Nancy
- Canton: Jarville-la-Malgrange
- Intercommunality: Pays du Sel et du Vermois

Government
  - Mayor (2020–2026): Jean-François Guillaume
- Area^{1}: 10.53 km^{2} (4.07 sq mi)
- Elevation: 228 m (748 ft)
- Highest elevation: 288 m (945 ft)
- Lowest elevation: 208 m (682 ft)
- Population (2023): 599
  - Density: 56.9/km^{2} (147/sq mi)
- Time zone: UTC+01:00 (CET)
  - Summer (DST): UTC+02:00 (CEST)
- INSEE/Postal code: 54571 /54210
- ^{1} French Land Register data, which excludes lakes, ponds, glaciers > 1 km^{2} (0.386 sq mi or 247 acres) and river estuaries.

Ville-en-Vermois is a commune in the Meurthe-et-Moselle department in north-eastern France.

== See also ==
- Communes of the Meurthe-et-Moselle department
