= Azelot =

- Commune
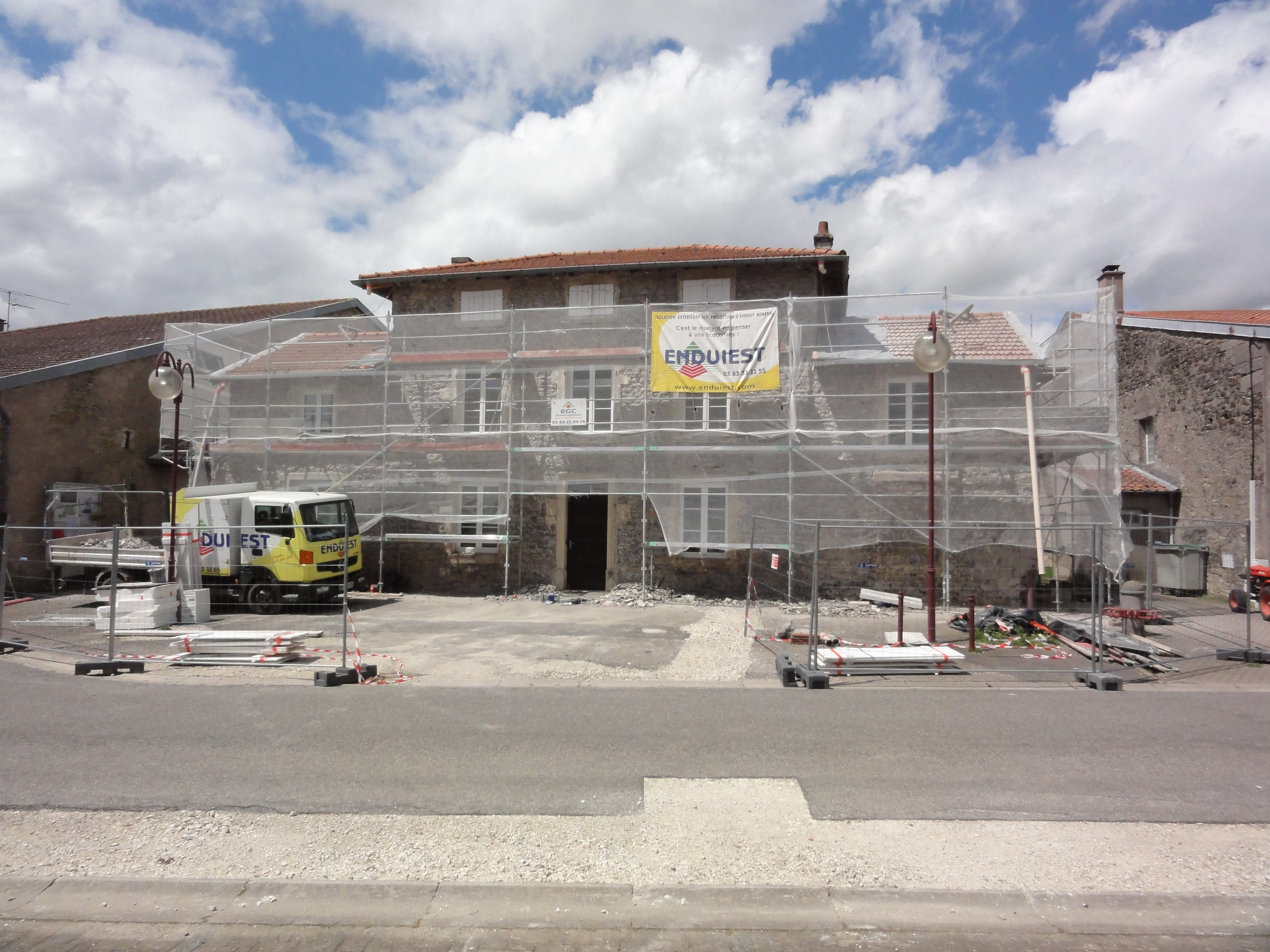
- The town hall in Azelot, in 2016

- Coat of arms
- Location of Azelot
- Location within France Location within Grand Est
- Coordinates: 48°35′24″N 6°14′04″E
- Country: France
- Region: Grand Est
- Department: Meurthe-et-Moselle
- Arrondissement: Nancy
- Canton: Jarville-la-Malgrange
- Intercommunality: CC Pays Sel Vermois

Government
  - Mayor (2020–2026): Christian Forget
- Area^{1}: 4.75 km^{2} (1.83 sq mi)
- Elevation: 287 m (942 ft)
- Highest elevation: 337 m (1,106 ft)
- Lowest elevation: 228 m (748 ft)
- Population (2023): 411
  - Density: 86.5/km^{2} (224/sq mi)
- Time zone: UTC+01:00 (CET)
  - Summer (DST): UTC+02:00 (CEST)
- INSEE/Postal code: 54037 /54210
- ^{1} French Land Register data, which excludes lakes, ponds, glaciers > 1 km^{2} (0.386 sq mi or 247 acres) and river estuaries.

Azelot (French pronunciation: [azlo]) is a commune in the Meurthe-et-Moselle department in northeastern France.

== Population ==
Historical population
Year	Pop.	±% p.a.
1968	115	—
1975	165	+5.29%
1982	353	+11.48%
1990	342	−0.39%
1999	360	+0.57%
2007	411	+1.67%
2012	419	+0.39%
2017	422	+0.14%
2023	411	−0.44%
Source: INSEE

== See also ==
- Communes of the Meurthe-et-Moselle department
