= Canton of Jarville-la-Malgrange =

Canton in Grand Est, France

Coordinates: 48.67°N 6.20°E

The canton of Jarville-la-Malgrange is an administrative division of the Meurthe-et-Moselle department, northeastern France. Its borders were modified at the French canton reorganisation which came into effect in March 2015. Its seat is in Jarville-la-Malgrange.

It consists of the following communes:

1. Azelot
2. Burthecourt-aux-Chênes
3. Coyviller
4. Fléville-devant-Nancy
5. Heillecourt
6. Houdemont
7. Jarville-la-Malgrange
8. Ludres
9. Lupcourt
10. Manoncourt-en-Vermois
11. Saint-Nicolas-de-Port
12. Ville-en-Vermois
