= Coyviller =

- Commune
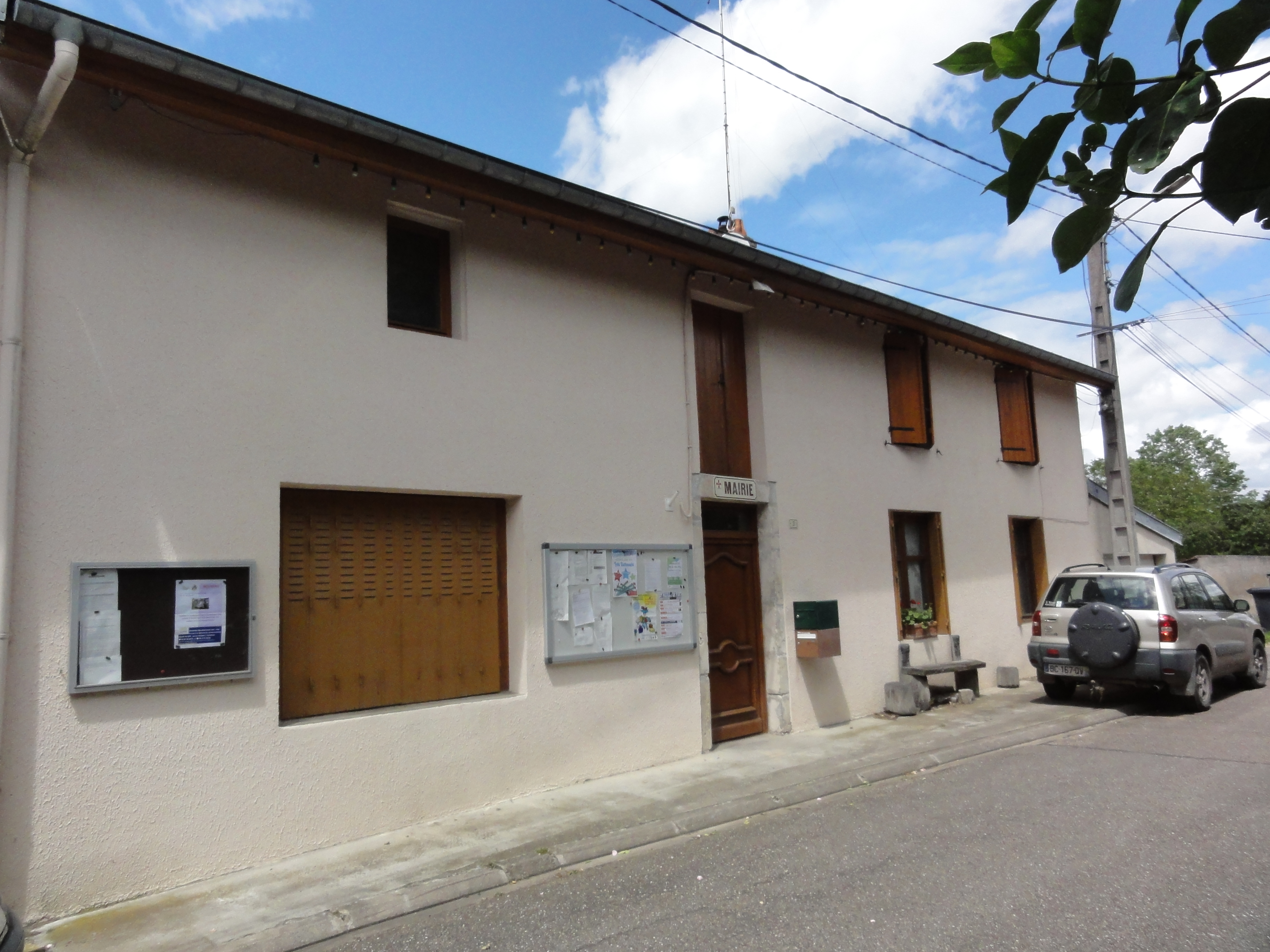
- The town hall in Coyviller

- Coat of arms
- Location of Coyviller
- Location within France Location within Grand Est
- Coordinates: 48°35′16″N 6°16′59″E
- Country: France
- Region: Grand Est
- Department: Meurthe-et-Moselle
- Arrondissement: Nancy
- Canton: Jarville-la-Malgrange
- Intercommunality: CC des Pays du Sel et du Vermois

Government
  - Mayor (2020–2026): Florence Picard
- Area^{1}: 4.53 km^{2} (1.75 sq mi)
- Elevation: 260 m (850 ft)
- Highest elevation: 351 m (1,152 ft)
- Lowest elevation: 235 m (771 ft)
- Population (2023): 157
  - Density: 34.7/km^{2} (89.8/sq mi)
- Time zone: UTC+01:00 (CET)
  - Summer (DST): UTC+02:00 (CEST)
- INSEE/Postal code: 54141 /54210
- ^{1} French Land Register data, which excludes lakes, ponds, glaciers > 1 km^{2} (0.386 sq mi or 247 acres) and river estuaries.

Coyviller (French pronunciation: [kwavile]) is a commune in the Meurthe-et-Moselle department in north-eastern France.

== See also ==
- Communes of the Meurthe-et-Moselle department
