= Saint-Nicolas-de-Port =

- Commune
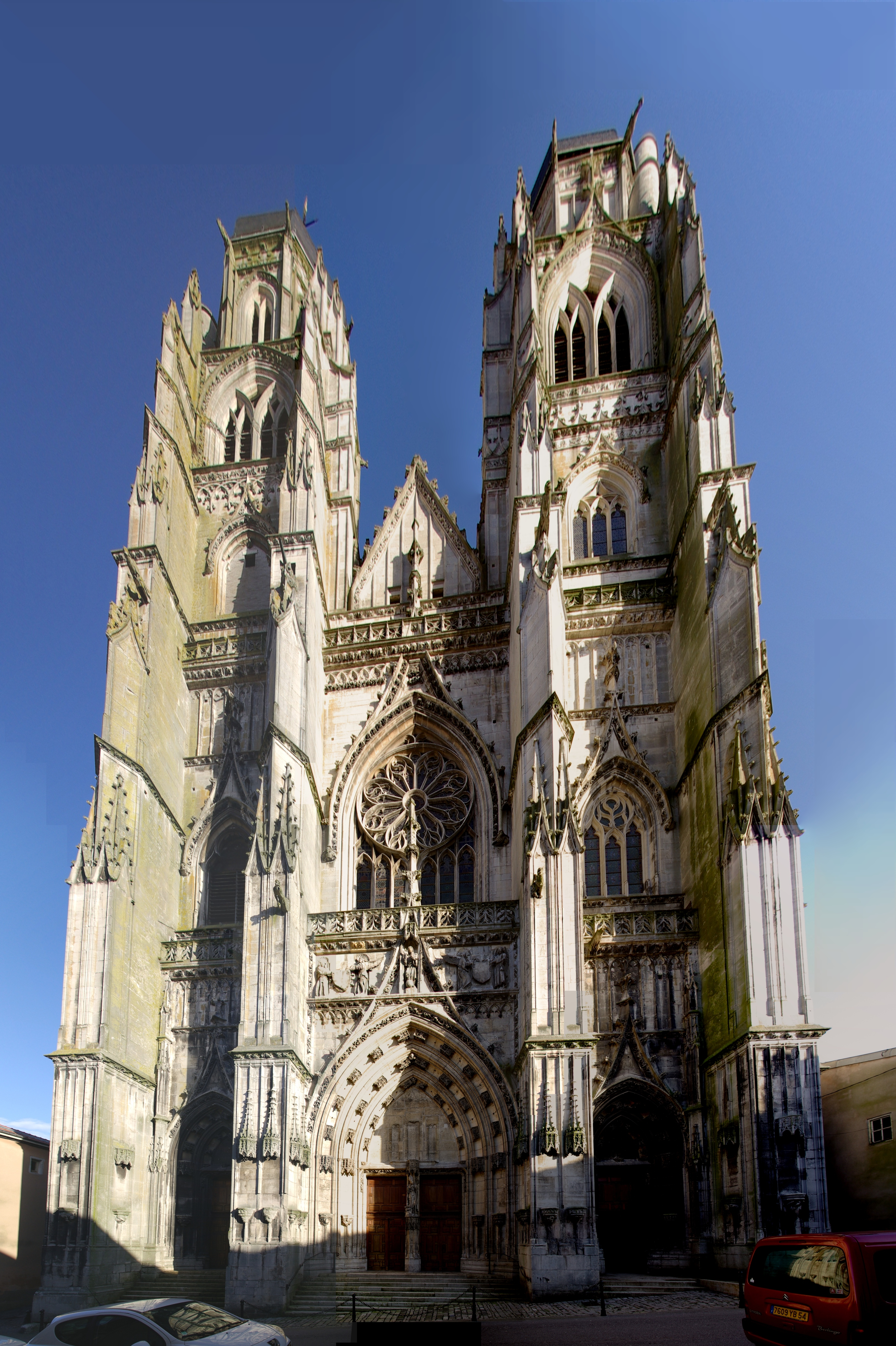
- The basilica in Saint-Nicolas-de-Port

- Coat of arms
- Location of Saint-Nicolas-de-Port
- Location within France Location within Grand Est
- Coordinates: 48°37′54″N 6°18′11″E
- Country: France
- Region: Grand Est
- Department: Meurthe-et-Moselle
- Arrondissement: Nancy
- Canton: Jarville-la-Malgrange
- Intercommunality: Pays du Sel et du Vermois

Government
  - Mayor (2020–2026): Luc Binsinger
- Area^{1}: 8.23 km^{2} (3.18 sq mi)
- Elevation: 232 m (761 ft)
- Highest elevation: 292 m (958 ft)
- Lowest elevation: 201 m (659 ft)
- Population (2023): 7,359
  - Density: 894/km^{2} (2,320/sq mi)
- Time zone: UTC+01:00 (CET)
  - Summer (DST): UTC+02:00 (CEST)
- INSEE/Postal code: 54483 /54210
- ^{1} French Land Register data, which excludes lakes, ponds, glaciers > 1 km^{2} (0.386 sq mi or 247 acres) and river estuaries.

Saint-Nicolas-de-Port (French pronunciation: [sɛ̃ nikɔla də pɔʁ]) is a commune in the Meurthe-et-Moselle département in north-eastern France.

The town's basilica, Saint Nicolas, is a pilgrimage site, supposedly holding relics of Saint Nicholas brought from Italy. It is one of France's Monuments historiques, and a minor basilica since 1950.

The town's inhabitants are known as Portois. In the past, the Portois were known as loudmouths; their neighbours across the Meurthe at Varangéville liked to gather on the opposite river bank to bombard them with a chorus indicating a wish to defecate in their mouths:

Booyaî d'Senn 'Colais,
Tend tet ghieule quand je...

which in the local Lorrain dialect means:

Loudmouths of St Nicks,
Open your gob when I'm taking a...

St Nicholas-de-Port is also known for fossil remains of very early (late Triassic) ancestral mammals.

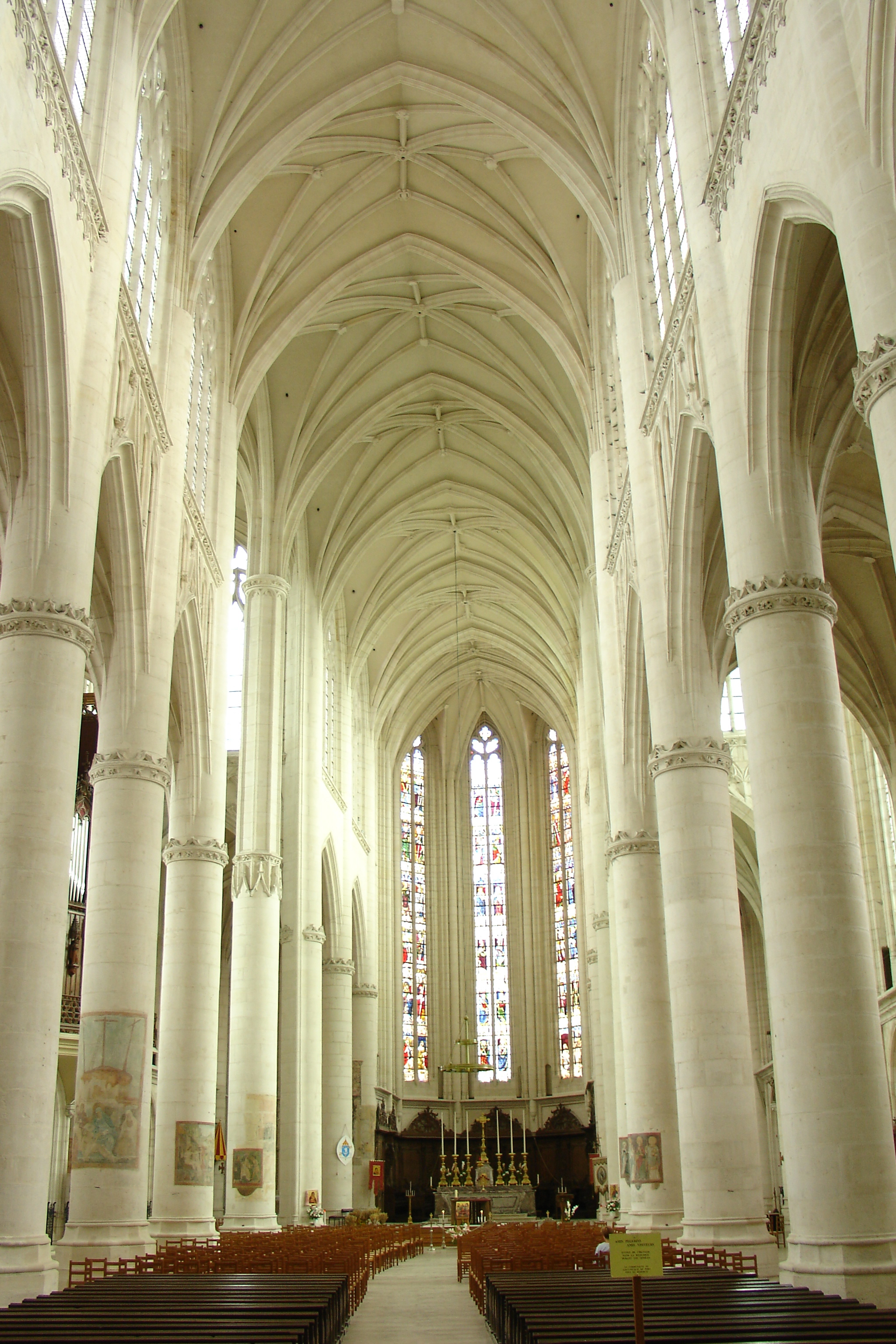
Basilica of Saint-Nicolas-de-Port

== Population ==
Historical population
Year	Pop.	±% p.a.
1968	7,279	—
1975	7,490	+0.41%
1982	7,482	−0.02%
1990	7,706	+0.37%
1999	7,505	−0.29%
2007	7,597	+0.15%
2012	7,633	+0.09%
2017	7,520	−0.30%
2023	7,359	−0.36%
Source: INSEE

== People ==
- André Joly (1706–1781?), court painter

== See also ==
- Communes of the Meurthe-et-Moselle department
